= Bernarda Ruiz de Rodríguez =

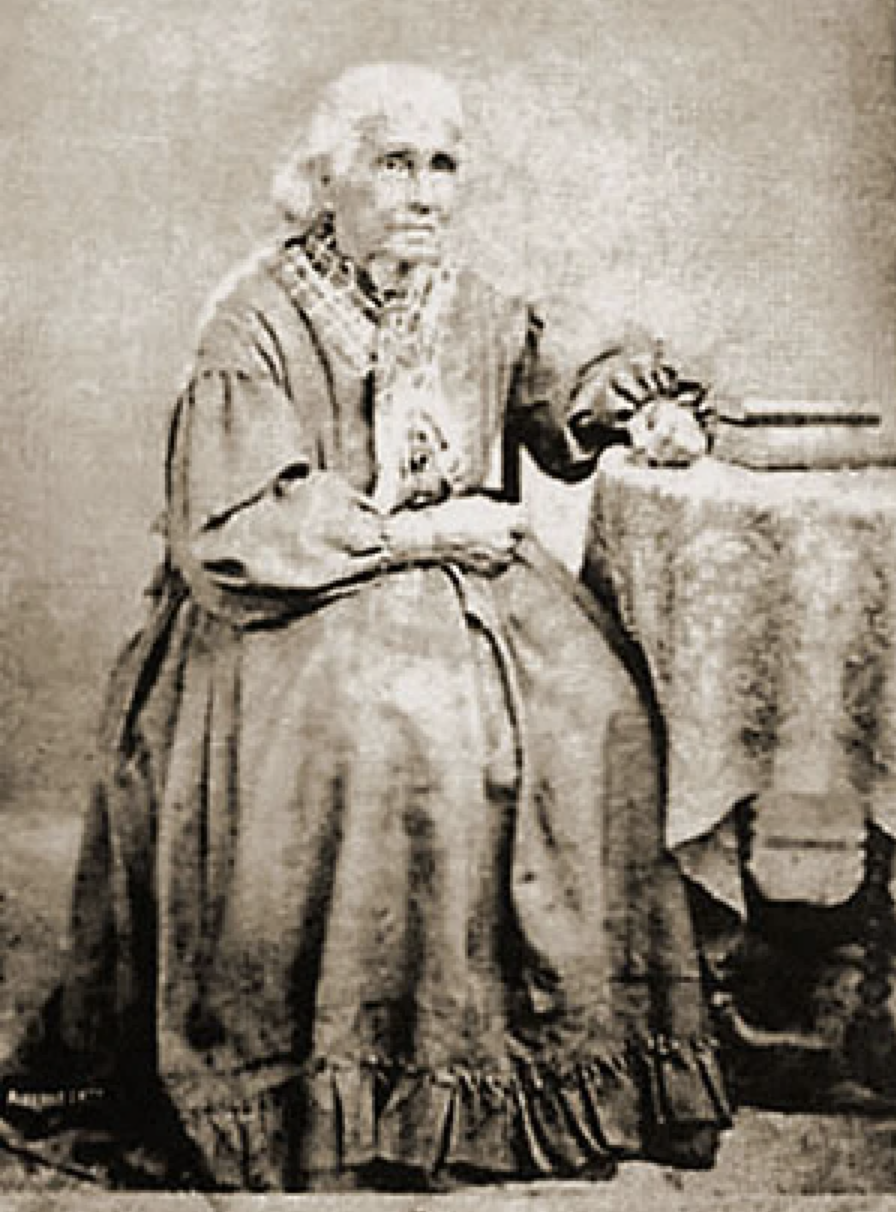
Bernarda Ruiz de Rodríguez in 1877.

Bernarda Ruiz de Rodríguez (c.1804 – 1880) was a Californio, best known for allegedly brokering the Treaty of Cahuenga between U.S. Lieutenant-Colonel John C. Frémont and Mexican General Andrés Pico on January 13, 1847 at Campo de Cahuenga in what is now Universal City, Los Angeles, California.

== Biography ==
Ruiz was born in Santa Barbara, California, United States, the daughter of a sergeant and an heiress. When the Mexican–American War broke out, many of her sons joined the fighting. Lt. Col. John C. Frémont, along with a band of 400 men, took over Santa Barbara, and made their base a hotel near Ruiz's home, from which they were planning an attack on Los Angeles. The tale goes that, knowing that the Americans were likely to win, Ruiz requested, and was granted, a 10-minute audience with Fremont. The 10 minutes became several hours, while she laid out a plan for "a 'generous peace' that would include Pico's pardon, release of prisoners, equal rights for all Californians, respect of property rights, and the opportunity for Mexican citizens to peaceably return to Mexico if they wanted".

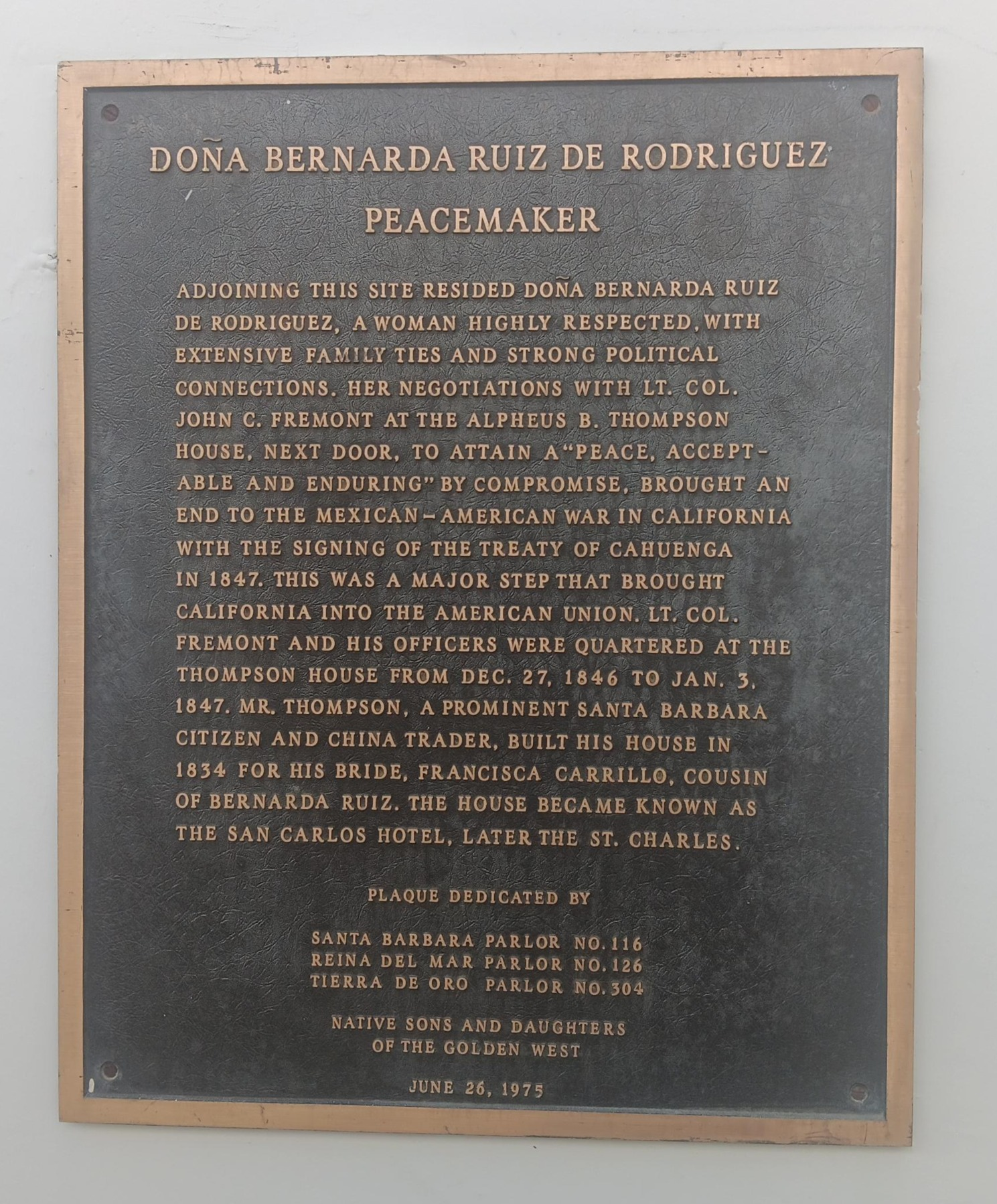
A plaque in Santa Barbara, California commemorating Ruiz's home and her role in the creation and signing of the Treat of Cahuenga.

After convincing Fremont, Ruiz met with Mexican General Andrés Pico, who arranged to draft the Treaty of Cahuenga almost entirely from Ruiz's suggestions. This informal treaty was influential in the drafting of the Treaty of Guadalupe Hidalgo, which formally ended the Mexican–American War and ceded the Southwest to the United States. The story of Bernarda Ruiz is based largely on two short paragraphs and a footnote in Fremont's memoirs, first published in 1887. Many aspects of the story cannot be verified in primary source materials.
