= Californios =

Term for Hispanic natives of California

- Flag of California

Languages
- Californian Spanish, American Spanish, English, California English, Spanglish, Indigenous languages of California, Indigenous languages of Mexico

Religion
- Predominantly Roman Catholic

Related ethnic groups
- Other Hispanos and Mexican Americans of the United States: Floridanos, Tejanos, Nuevomexicanos; Other Hispanic and Latino peoples: Mexican Americans, Chicanos, Mexicans, Spaniards, Spanish-Americans, Indigenous Mexican American, Louisiana Isleños; Other California Hispanics: Basque Californians

Californios (singular Californio) are Hispanic Californians, especially those descended from Spanish and Mexican settlers of the 17th through 19th centuries who arrived under Spanish and Mexican rule before California was annexed by the United States. California's Spanish-speaking community has resided there since 1683 and is made up of varying Spanish and Mexican origins, including Criollos, Mestizos, Indigenous Californian peoples, and small numbers of Mulatos. Alongside the Tejanos of Texas and Neomexicanos of New Mexico and Colorado, Californios are part of the larger Spanish-American/Mexican-American/Hispano community of the modern United States, which has inhabited what is now the American Southwest and the West Coast since the 16th century. Some may also identify as Chicanos, a term that came about in the 1960s.

The term Californio (historical, regional Spanish for 'Californian') was originally applied by and to the Spanish-speaking residents of Las Californias during the periods of Spanish California and Mexican California, between 1683 and 1848. The first Californios were the children of the early Spanish military expeditions into northern reaches of the Californias, which started out from what is now modern Mexico. Many of their fathers were soldiers who established the presidios of California and guarded the California mission system.

Later, the primary cultural focus of the Californio population became the Vaquero tradition practiced by the landed gentry, who received large land grants and created the Rancho system. In the 1820s–40s, American and European settlers increasingly migrated to Mexican California. Many married Californio women and became Mexican citizens, learning Spanish and often converting to Catholicism, the state religion. They are often also considered Californios, for their adherence to Californio language and culture.

In 2004, studies estimated that between 300,000 and 500,000 state inhabitants have ancestry from the Spanish and Mexican eras of California.

== Definitions ==
The term "Californio" has different meanings depending on the author or source. According to the Real Academia Española, a Californio is a person native to California. Merriam-Webster dictionary defines a Californio as both a native or resident of this state and a specific ethnic group: the Spanish settlers and their descendants in California.

Authors such as Douglas Monroy, Damian Bacich or Covadonga Lamar Prieto, among others, define Californios as exclusively applying to Alta California residents and their descendants.

Historians Hunt Janin and Ursula Carlson consider a Californio to be any settler who migrated to Alta California and their descendants; and also non-Hispanic immigrants who intermarried with Hispanics and integrated into the Californio culture during the Mexican era, and their descendants.

Calisphere and author Ferol Egan restrict the meaning of Californio to the Californian elite who acquired land during the Spanish and Mexican periods and their descendants.

Leonard Pitt considers a Californio to be any Spanish-speaking person born in California. Writer Jose Antonio Burciaga considers Californios to be any Hispanic living in California, even if they have lived there temporarily. Burciaga, in a 1995 Los Angeles Times article, points to such examples as Dolores Huerta, Luisa Moreno and Bert Corona.

== History ==
=== Early colonization ===
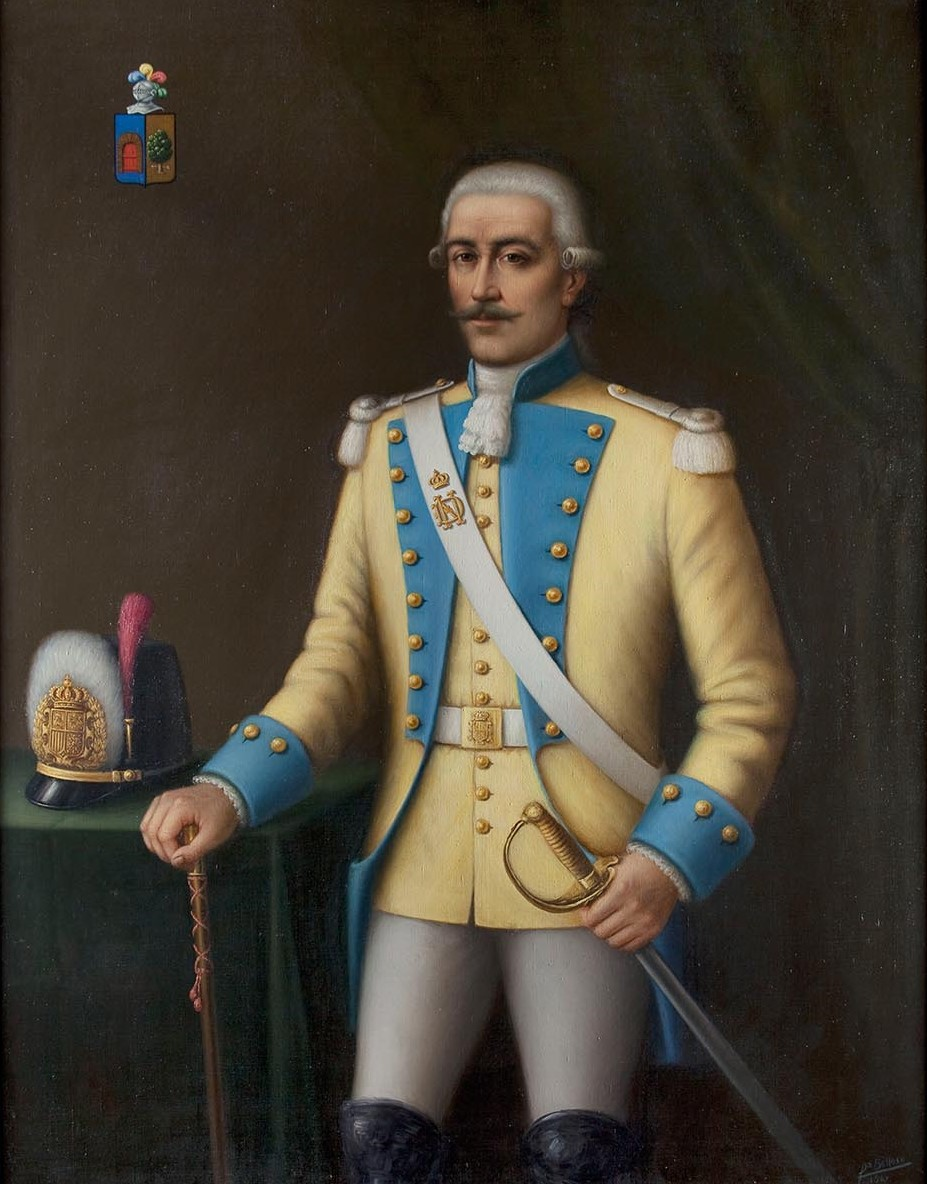
Gaspar de Portolá led the 1769 Portolá expedition and served as the first Governor of the Californias.

In 1769, Gaspar de Portolá and less than two hundred men, on an expedition, founded the Presidio of San Diego as a military post. On July 16, Franciscan friars Junípero Serra, Juan Viscaino and Fernando Parron raised and 'blessed a cross', establishing the first mission in upper Las Californias, Mission San Diego de Alcalá. Colonists began arriving in 1774.

Monterey was established in 1770 by Father Junípero Serra and Gaspar de Portolà (the first governor of Las Californias province (1767–1770), explorer and founder of San Diego and Monterey). Monterey was settled with two friars and about 40 men and served as the capital of California from 1777 to 1849. The nearby Carmel Mission in Carmel was moved there after a year in Monterey to keep the mission and its Mission Indians away from the Monterey Presidio soldiers. It was the headquarters of the original Alta California province missions headed by Father-President Junípero Serra from 1770 until his death in 1784—he is buried there. Monterey was originally the only port of entry for all taxable goods in California. All ships were supposed to clear through Monterey and pay the roughly 42% tariff (customs duties on imported goods before trading anywhere else in Alta California). The oldest governmental building in the state is the Monterey Custom House and California's Historic Landmark Number One. The Californian, California's oldest newspaper, was first published in Monterey on August 15, 1846, after the city's occupation by the U.S. Navy's Pacific Squadron on July 7, 1846.

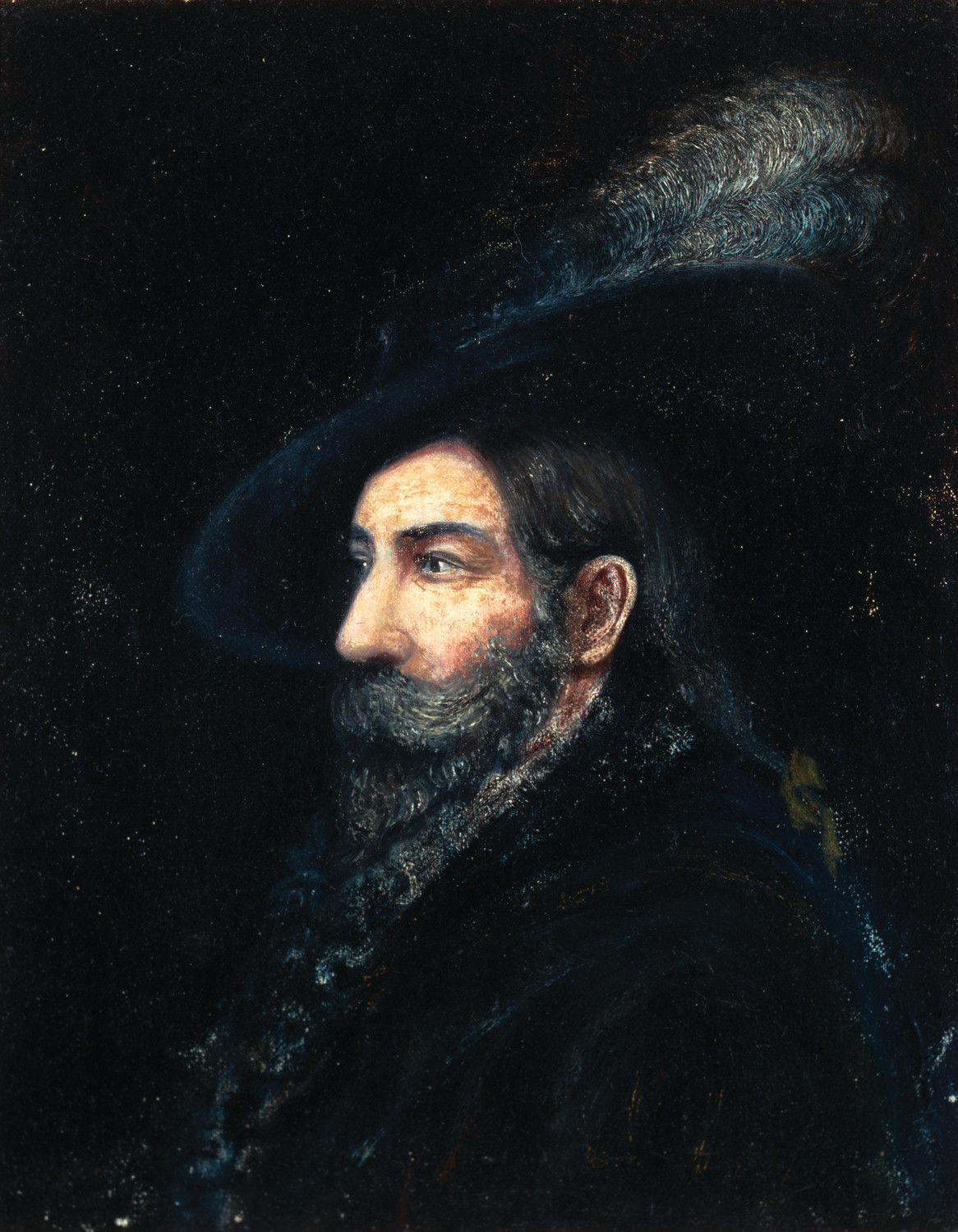
Juan Bautista de Anza led the 1775–76 Anza expedition.

Late in 1775, Colonel Juan Bautista de Anza led an overland expedition over the Gila River trail he had discovered in 1774 to bring colonists from Sonora New Spain (Mexico) to California to settle two missions, one presidio, and one pueblo (town). Anza led 240 friars, soldiers and colonists with their families. They started out with 695 horses and mules and 385 Texas Longhorn bulls and cows—starting the cattle and horse industry in California. About 600 horses and mules and 300 cattle survived the trip. In 1776 about 200 leather-jacketed soldiers, Friars and colonists with their families moved to what was called Yerba Buena (now San Francisco) to start building a mission and a presidio there. The leather jackets the soldiers wore consisted of several layers of hardened leather and were strong enough body armor to usually stop an Indian arrow. In California, the cattle and horses had few predators and plentiful grass in all but drought years, and essentially grew and multiplied as feral animals—doubling roughly every two years. This partially displaced the Tule Elk and pronghorn antelope who had lived there in large herds previously.

Anza selected the sites of the Presidio of San Francisco and Mission San Francisco de Asís in what is now San Francisco; on his way back to Monterey, he sited Mission Santa Clara de Asís and the pueblo San Jose in the Santa Clara Valley but did not initially leave settlers to settle them. Mission San Francisco de Asís (or Mission Dolores), the sixth Spanish mission, was founded on June 29, 1776, by Lieutenant José Joaquin Moraga and Father Francisco Palóu (a companion of Junípero Serra).

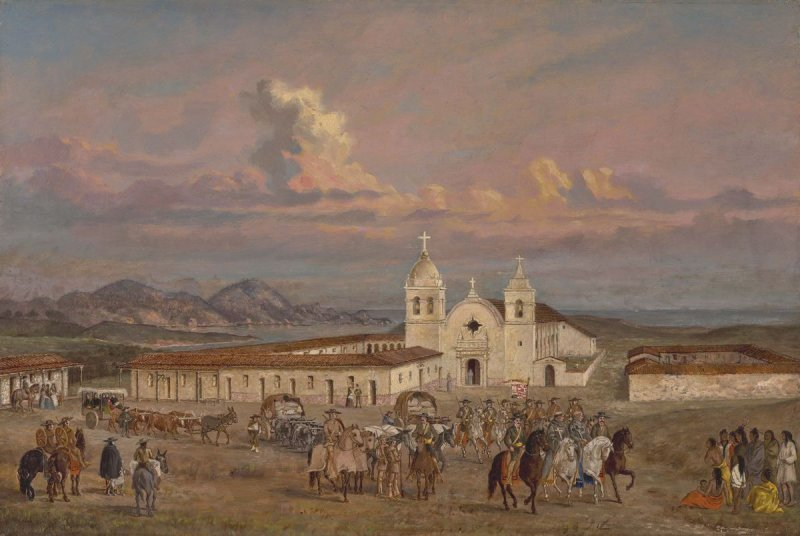
Mission San Carlos Borromeo de Carmelo, established in 1770, was the headquarters of the Californian mission system from 1797 until 1833.

On November 29, 1777, El Pueblo de San José de Guadalupe (The Town of Saint Joseph of Guadalupe, now called simply San Jose) was founded by José Joaquín Moraga on the first pueblo-town not associated with a mission or a military post (presidio) in Alta California. The original San Jose settlers were part of the original group of 200 settlers and soldiers that had originally settled in Yerba Buena (San Francisco). Mission Santa Clara, founded in 1777, was the eighth mission founded and closest mission to San Jose. Mission Santa Clara was 3 miles (5 km) from the original San Jose pueblo site in neighboring Santa Clara. Mission San José was not founded until 1797, about 20 miles (30 km) north of San Jose in what is now Fremont.

The Los Angeles Pobladores ("settlers") is the name given to the 44 original Sonorans—22 adults and 22 children—who settled the Pueblo of Los Angeles in 1781. The pobladores were agricultural families from Sonora, Mexico. They were the last settlers to use the Anza trail as the Quechans (Yumas) closed the trail for the next 40 years shortly after they had passed over it. Almost none of the settlers was españoles (Spanish); the rest had casta (caste) designations such as mestizo, indio, and negro. Some classifications were changed in the California Census of 1790, as often happened in colonial Spanish America.

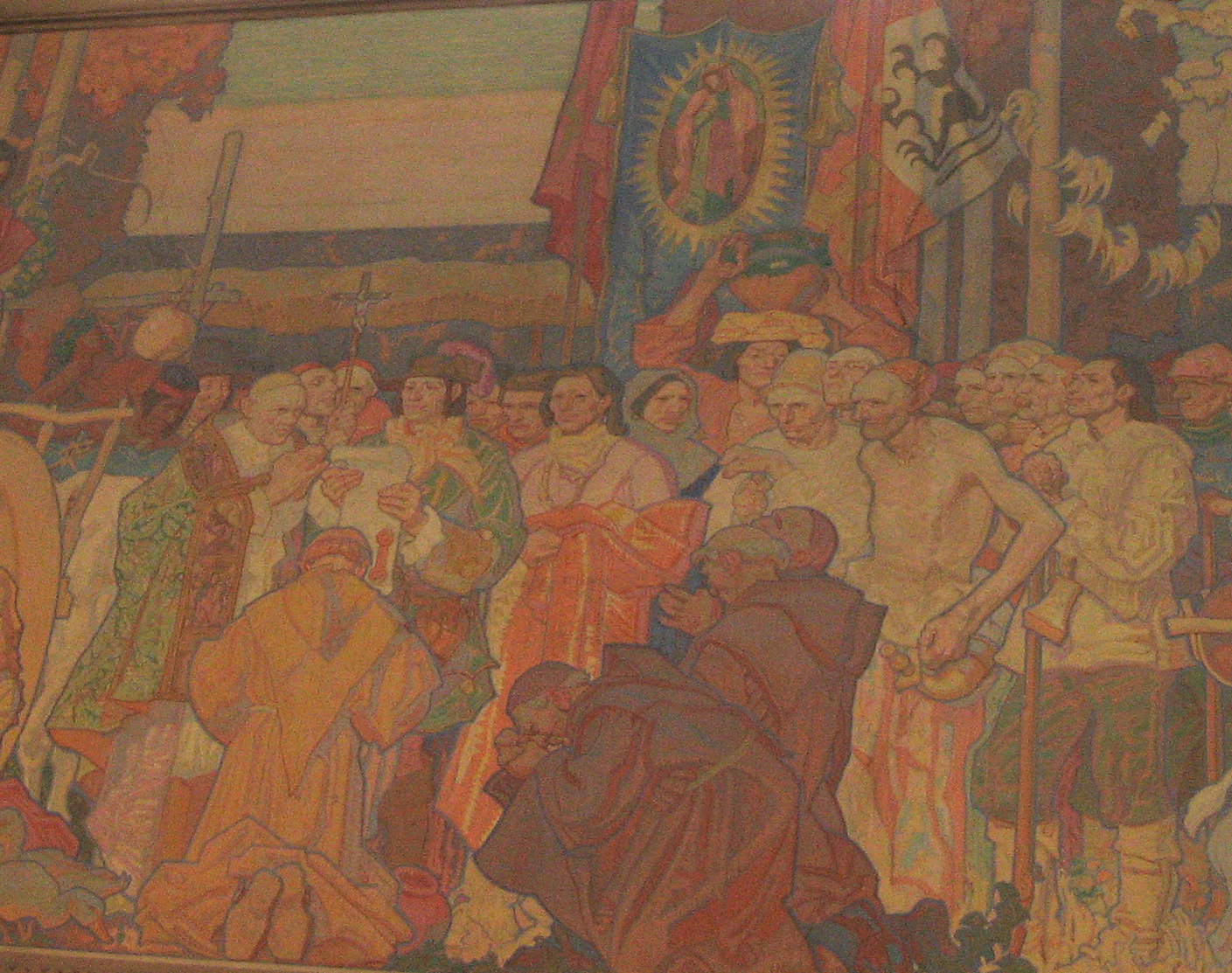
The founding of Los Angeles by the Felipe de Neve and the Los Angeles Pobladores in 1781.

The settlers and escort soldiers who founded the towns of San José de Guadalupe, Yerba Buena (San Francisco), Monterey, San Diego and La Reina de Los Ángeles were primarily mestizo and of mixed Spaniard and Native American, and sometimes mulato, ancestry from the province of Sonora y Sinaloa in Mexico. Recruiters in Mexico of the Fernando Rivera y Moncada expedition and other expeditions later, who were charged with founding an agricultural community in Alta California, had a difficult time persuading people to emigrate to such an isolated outpost with no agriculture, no towns, no stores or developments of almost any kind. The majority of settlers were recruited from the northwestern parts of Mexico. The only tentative link with Mexico was via ship after the Quechans (Yumas) closed the Colorado River's Yuma Crossing in 1781. For the next 40 years, an average of only 2.5 ships per year visited California with 13 years showing no recorded ships arriving.

In Californio society, casta (caste) designations carried more weight than they did in older communities of central Mexico. One similar concept was the gente de razón, a term literally meaning "people of reason". It designated peoples who were culturally Hispanic (that is, they were not living in traditional Native American communities) and had adopted Christianity. This served to distinguish the Mexican Indio settlers and converted Californian Indios from the barbaro (barbarian) Californian Native Americans, who had not converted or become part of the Hispanic towns. California's Governor Pío Pico was criticized for his alleged descent from mestizo and mulato (mulatto) settlers.

=== Later years of Mexican rule ===
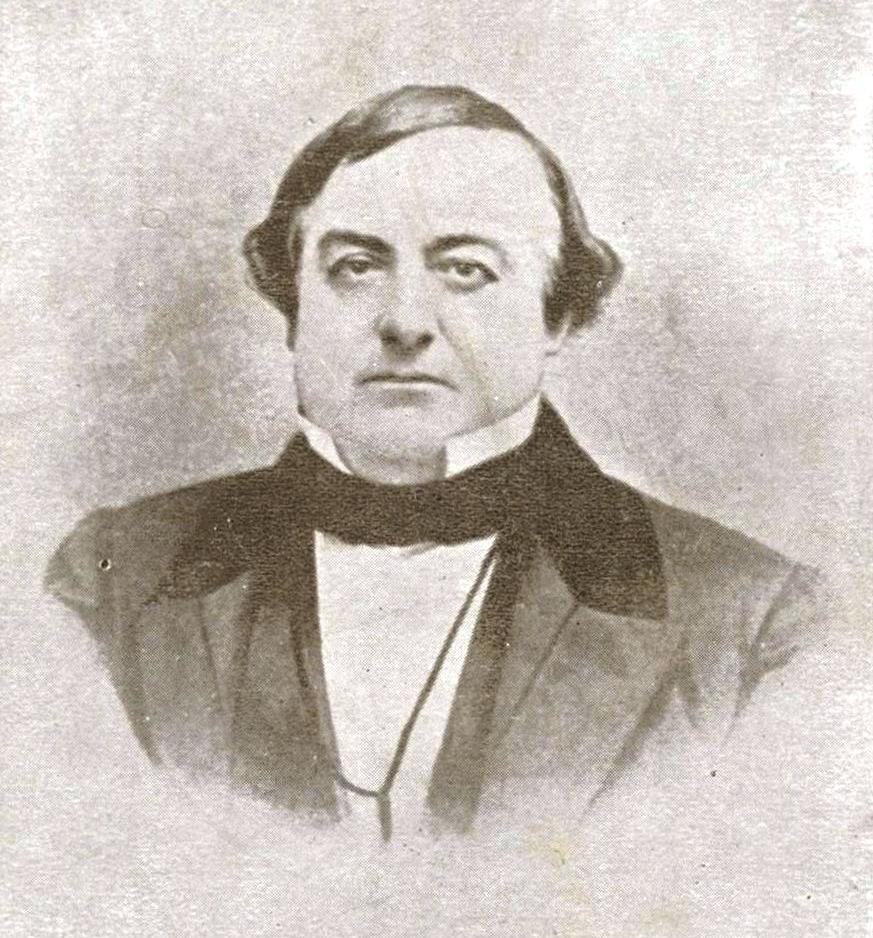
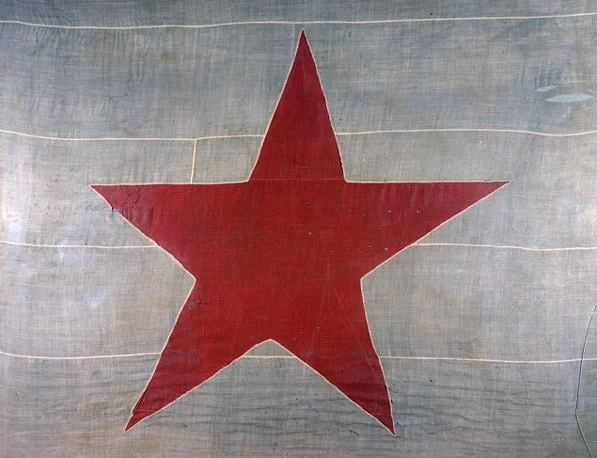
Juan Bautista Alvarado led a 1836–37 movement for the independence of Alta California, using the red lone star as its symbol, which is represented in the modern flag of California.

In the 1830s, the newly formed Mexican government was experiencing difficulties, having gone through several revolts, wars, internal conflicts and a seemingly never-ending string of Mexican Presidents. One of the problems in Mexico was the large amount of land controlled by the Catholic Church (estimated then at about one-third of all settled property), which was continually granted property by many landowners when they died and controlled property supposedly held in trust for the Native Americans. This land, as it gradually accumulated, was seldom sold, as it cost nothing to keep, but could be rented out to gain additional income for the Catholic Church to pay its priests, friars, bishops, and other expenses. The Catholic Church was the largest and richest landowner in Mexico and its provinces. In California, the situation was even more pronounced, as the Franciscan friars held over 90% of all settled property, supposedly in trust for the mission Indians.

In 1834, secularization laws that voided the mission control of lands in the northern settlements under Mexican rule were enacted. The missions directed thousands of Indians in herding livestock, growing crops and orchards, weaving cloth, etc. for the missions, presidios, and pueblo (town) dwellers. The mission lands and herds formerly controlled by the missions were usually distributed to the settlers around each mission. Since most had almost no money, the land was distributed or granted free or at very little cost to friends and families of the government officials (or those who paid the highest bribes).

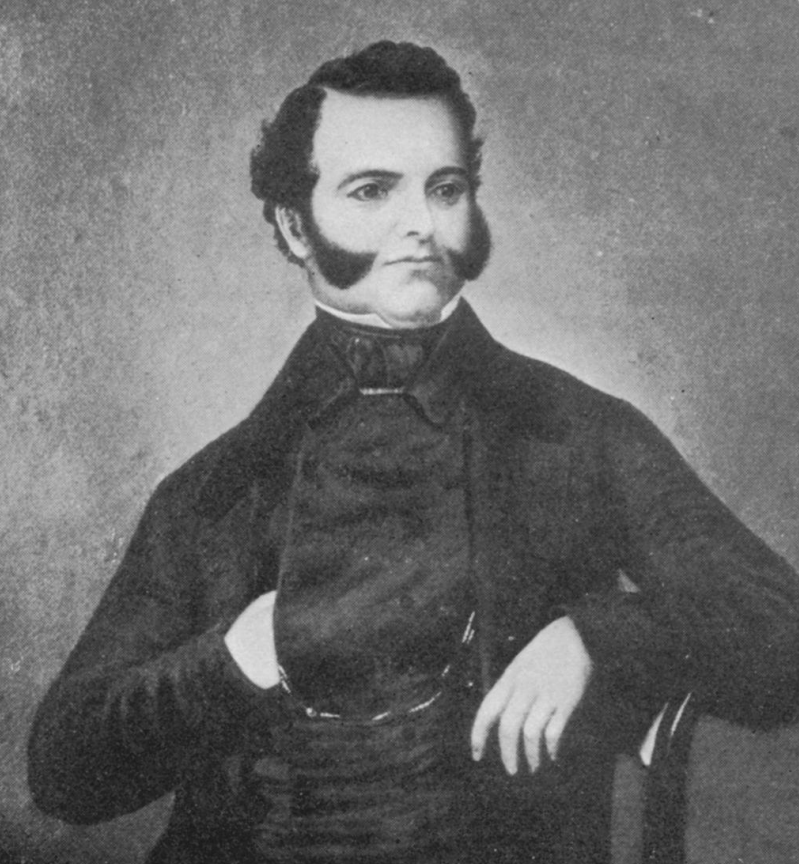
Californio statesman and general Mariano G. Vallejo

The Californio Mariano Guadalupe Vallejo, for example, was reputed to be the richest man in California before the California Gold Rush. Vallejo oversaw the secularization of Mission San Francisco Solano and the distributions of its roughly 1,000,000 acres (4,000 km^{2}). He founded the towns of Sonoma and Petaluma, California, owned Mare Island and the future town site of Benicia, California, and was granted the 66,622-acre (269.61 km^{2}) Rancho Petaluma, the 84,000-acre (340 km^{2}) Rancho Suscol and other properties by Governor José Figueroa in 1834 and later. Vallejo's younger brother, Jose Manuel Salvador Vallejo (1813–1876), was granted the 22,718-acre (91.94 km^{2}) Rancho Napa and other additional grants known as Salvador's Ranch. Over the hills of Mariano Vallejo's estate of Petaluma roamed ten thousand cattle, four to six thousand horses, and many thousands of sheep. He occupied a home on the plaza at Sonoma, where he entertained all who came with hospitality; few travelers of note came to California without visiting him. At Petaluma he had a great ranch house called La Hacienda. About 1849 on his home farm called Lachryma Montis (Tear of the Mountain), he built a modern frame house where he spent the later years of his life.

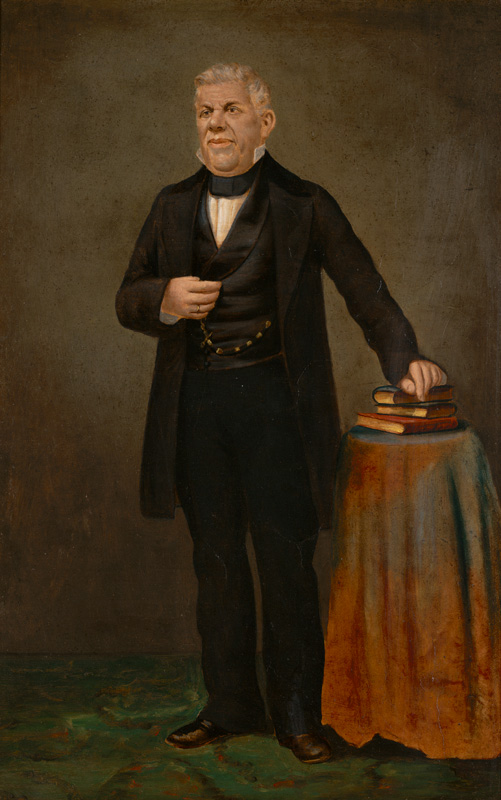
Pío Pico served as the last Governor of Alta California under Mexican rule.

Vallejo tried to get the California State Capital moved permanently to Benicia, California on land he sold to the state government in December, 1851. It was named Benicia for the General's wife, Francisca Benicia Carillo de Vallejo. The General intended that the prospective city be named "Francisca" after his wife, but this name was dropped when the city of Yerba Buena changed its name to "San Francisco" on January 30, 1847. Benicia was the third site selected to serve as the California state capital, and its newly constructed city hall was California's capitol from February 11, 1853, to February 25, 1854. Vallejo gave the Rancho Suscol to his oldest daughter, Epifania Guadalupe Vallejo, on April 3, 1851, as a wedding present when she married U.S. Army General John H. Frisbie. It is unknown what he gave as a wedding present when his two daughters Natalia and Jovita married the brothers, Attila Haraszthy and Agoston Haraszthy, on the same day—June 1, 1863.

In some cases particular mission land and livestock were split into parcels and then distributed by drawing lots. In nearly all cases, the Indians got very little of the mission land or livestock. Whether any of the proceeds of these sales made their way back to Mexico City is unknown. These lands had been worked by settlers and the much larger settlements of local Native American Kumeyaay peoples on the missions for several generations in some cases. When the missions were secularized or dismantled and the Indians did not have to live under continued friar and military control, they were essentially left to survive on their own. Many of the Native Americans reverted to their former tribal existence and left the missions, while others found they could get room and board and some clothing by working for the large ranches that took over the former mission lands and livestock. Many natives who had learned to ride horses and knew a smattering of Spanish were recruited to become vaqueros (cowboys or cattle herders) that worked the cattle and horses on the large ranchos and did other work. Some of these rancho owners and their hired hands would make up the bulk of the few hundred Californios fighting in the brief Mexican–American War conflicts in California. Some of the Californios and California Native Americans fought on the side of the U.S. settlers during the conflict, with some joining John Frémont's California Battalion.

=== U.S. conquest of California ===
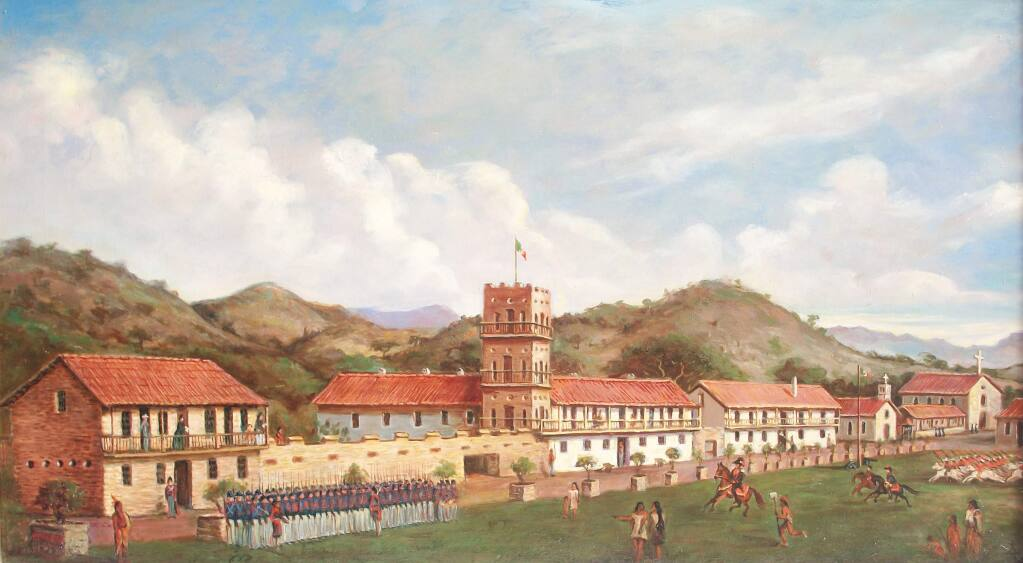
General Mariano Guadalupe Vallejo reviewing his troops in Sonoma, 1846.

Before the Mexican–American War of 1846–1848, the Californios forced the Mexican appointed governor, Manuel Micheltorena, to flee back to Mexico with most of his troops. Pío Pico, a Californio, was the governor of California during the conflict.

The Pacific Squadron, the United States Naval force stationed in the Pacific, was instrumental in the capture of Alta California after war was declared on April 24, 1846. The U.S. Navy with its force of 350–400 U.S. Marines and "bluejacket" sailors on board several U.S. Naval ships near California were essentially the only significant United States military force on the Pacific Coast in the early months of the Mexican–American War. The Royal Navy Pacific Station ships in the Pacific had more men and were more heavily armed than the U.S. Navy's Pacific Squadron, but did not have orders to help or hinder the occupation of California. New orders would have taken almost two years to get back to the British ships. The Marines were stationed aboard each ship to assist in ship-to-ship combat, as snipers in the rigging, and to defend against boarders. They could also be detached for use as armed infantry. In addition, there were some "bluejacket" sailors on each ship that could be detached for shore duty as artillery crews and infantry, leaving the ship functional though short handed. The artillery used were often small naval cannon converted to land use. The Pacific Squadron had orders, in the event of war with Mexico, to seize the ports in Mexican California and elsewhere along the Pacific Coast.

The only other United States military force in California at the time was a small exploratory expedition led by Lieutenant Colonel John C. Frémont, made up of 30 topographical, surveying, etc. army troops and about 25 men hired as guides and hunters. The Frémont expedition had been dispatched to California, in 1845, from the U.S. Army Corps of Topographical Engineers.

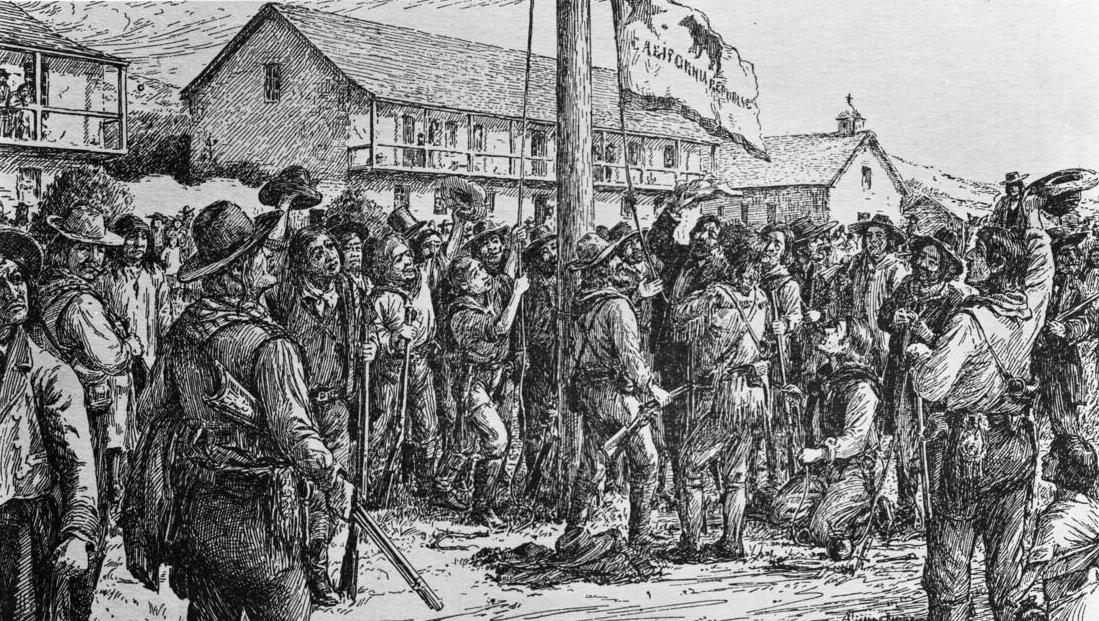
The raising of the Bear Flag and proclamation of the California Republic in Sonoma, following the Bear Flag Revolt on June 14, 1846.

Rumors that the Californio government in California was planning to arrest and deport many of the new residents as they had in 1844 led to a degree of uncertainty. On June 14, 1846, thirty-three settlers in Sonoma Valley took preemptive action and captured the small Californio garrison of Sonoma, California without firing a shot and raised a homemade flag with a bear and star (the "Bear Flag") to symbolize their taking control. The words "California Republic" appeared on the flag but were never officially adopted by the insurgents. The present flag of California is based on the original "Bear Flag".

Their capture of the small garrison in Sonoma was later called the "Bear Flag Revolt". The Republic's only commander-in-chief was William B. Ide, whose command lasted 25 days. On June 23, 1846, Frémont arrived from the future state of Oregon's border with about 30 soldiers and 30 scouts and hunters and took command of the "Republic" in the name of the United States. Frémont began to recruit a militia from among the new settlers living around Sutter's Fort to join with his forces. Many of these settlers had just arrived over the California Trail and many more would continue to arrive after July 1846 when they got to California. The Donner Party were the last travelers on the trail in late 1846 when they were caught by early snow while they were trying to get across the Sierra Nevada.

Under orders from John D. Sloat, Commodore of the Pacific Squadron, the U.S. Marines and some of the bluejacket sailors from the U.S. Navy sailing ships USS Savannah with the Cyane and Levant captured the Alta California capital city of Monterey on July 7, 1846. The only shots fired were salutes by the U.S. Navy ships in the harbor to the U.S. flag now flying over Monterey. Two days later on July 9, USS Portsmouth, under Captain John S. Montgomery, landed 70 Marines and bluejacket sailors at Clark's Point in San Francisco Bay and captured Yerba Buena (now named San Francisco) without firing a shot.

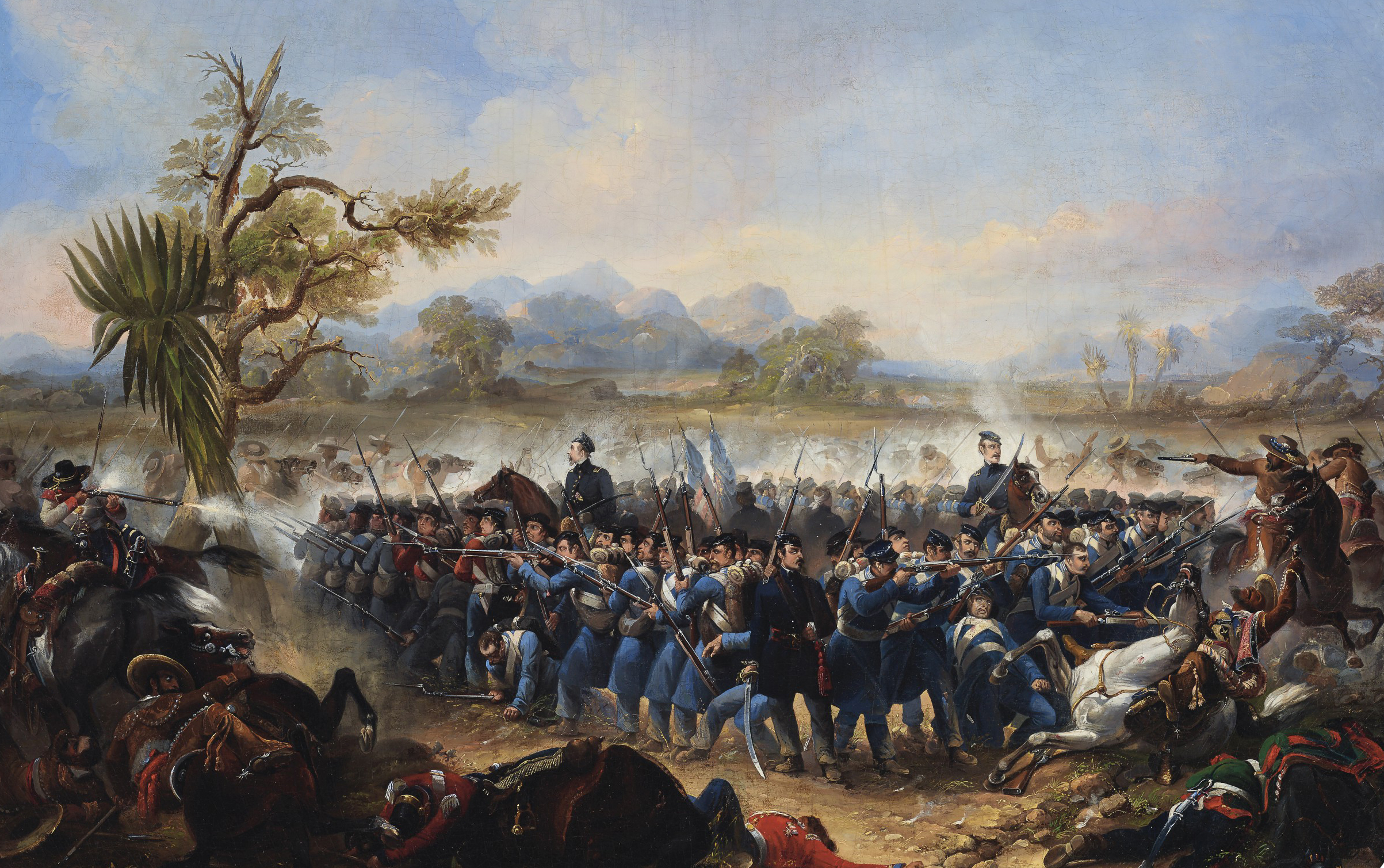
The Battle of Río San Gabriel

On July 11, the Royal Navy sloop HMS Juno entered San Francisco Bay, causing Montgomery to man his defenses. The large British ship, 2,600 tons with a crew of 600, man-of-war HMS Collingwood, flagship under Sir George S. Seymour, also arrived at about this time outside Monterey Harbor. Both British ships observed, but did not enter the conflict.

Shortly after July 9, when it became clear the US Navy was taking action, the short-lived Bear Flag Republic was converted into a United States military occupation and the Bear Flag was replaced by the U.S. flag. Commodore Robert F. Stockton took over as the senior U.S. military commander in California in late July 1846 and asked Frémont's force of California militia and his 60 men to form the California Battalion with U.S. Army pay and ranks with Fremont in command. The California "Republic" disbanded and William Ide enlisted in the California Battalion, when it was established in late July 1846, as a private.

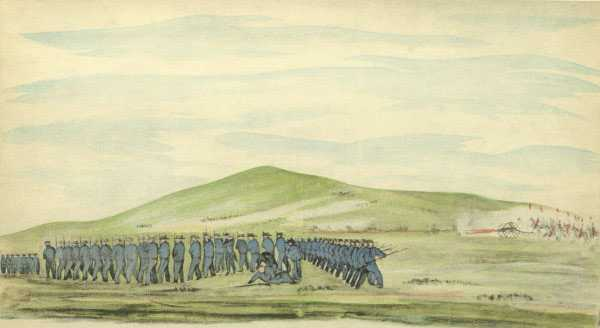
American forces retreating to San Pedro following the Californio victory at the Siege of Los Angeles in 1846.

The first task given to the California Battalion and was to assist in the capture of San Diego and Pueblo de Los Angeles. On July 26, 1846, Lieutenant Colonel Frémont's California Battalion of about 160 boarded the sloop USS Cyane, under the command of Captain Samuel Francis Du Pont, and sailed for San Diego. They landed on July 29, 1846, and a detachment of Marines and blue-jackets, followed shortly by Frémont's California Battalion from Cyane, landed and took possession of the town without firing a shot. Leaving about 40 men to garrison San Diego, Fremont continued on to Los Angeles where on August 13, with the Navy band playing and colors flying, the combined forces of Stockton and Frémont entered Pueblo de Los Angeles, without a man killed nor shot fired. U.S. Marine Lieutenant Archibald Gillespie, Frémont's second in command, was appointed military commander of Los Angeles with an inadequate force from 30 to 50 California Battalion troops stationed there to keep the peace.

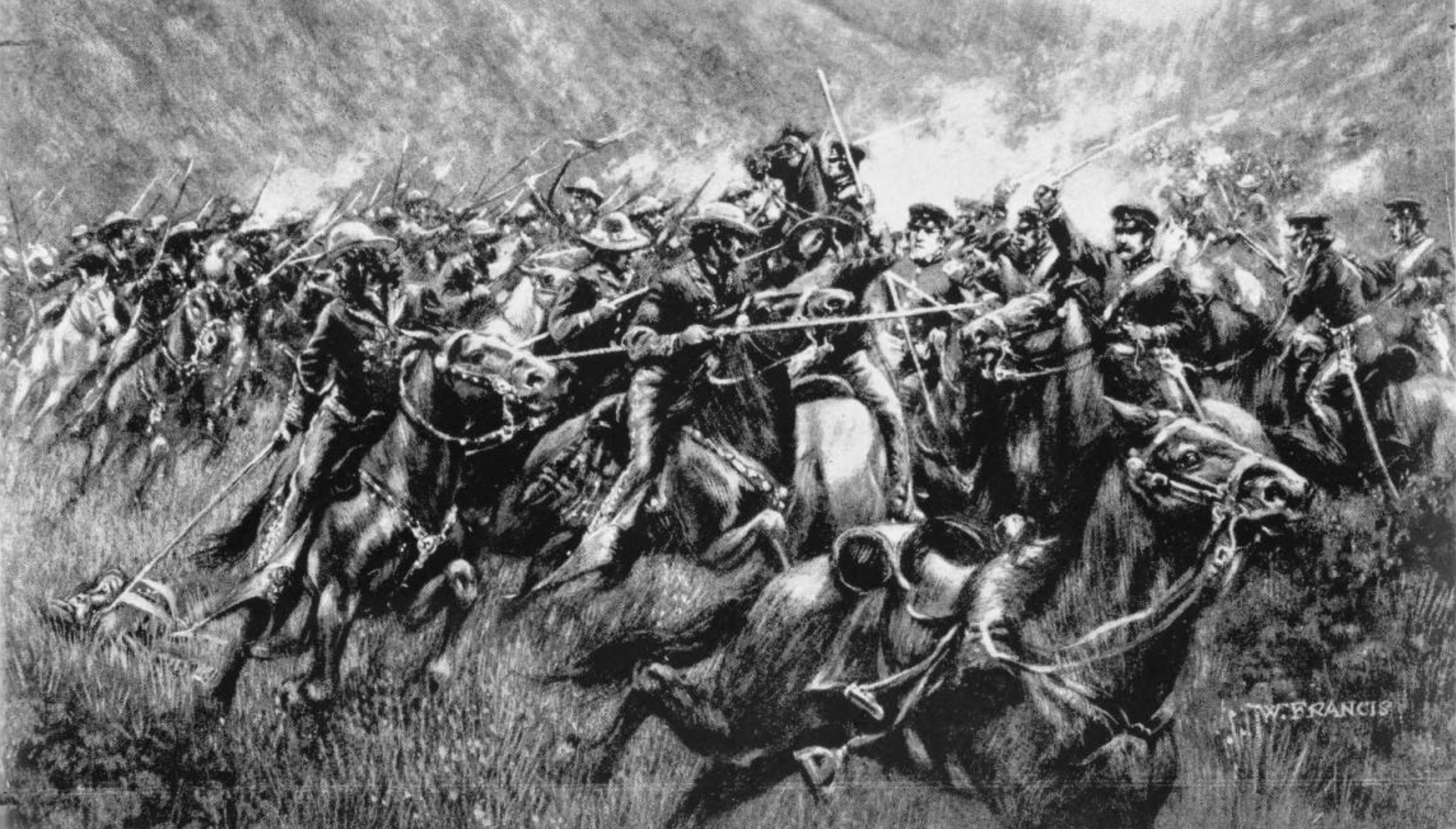
Battle of San Pasqual in 1846.

In Pueblo de Los Angeles, the largest city in California with about 3,000 residents, things might have remained peaceful, except that Major Gillespie placed the town under martial law, greatly angering some of the Californios. On September 23, 1846, about 200 Californios under Californio General José María Flores staged a revolt, the Siege of Los Angeles, and exchanged shots with the Americans in their quarters at the Government House. Gillespie and his men withdrew from their headquarters in town to Fort Hill which, unfortunately, had no water. Gillespie was caught in a trap, badly outnumbered by the besiegers. John Brown, an American, called by the Californios Juan Flaco, meaning "Lean John", succeeded in breaking through the Californio lines and riding by horseback to San Francisco Bay (a distance of almost 400 miles (640 km)) in an amazing 52 hours where he delivered to Stockton a dispatch from Gillespie notifying him of the situation. Gillespie, on September 30, finally accepted the Californio terms and departed for San Pedro with his forces, weapons, flags and two cannon (the others were spiked and left behind). Gillespie's men were accompanied by the exchanged American prisoners and several non-Californio residents.

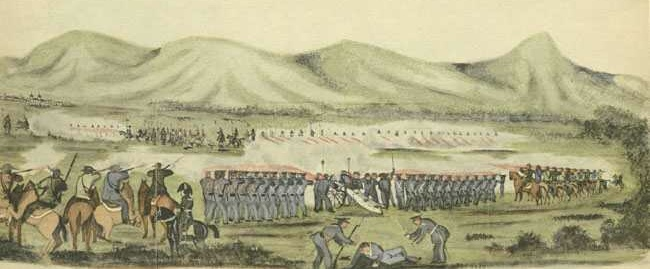
The 1847 Battle of Santa Clara was one of the last battles of the conquest.

It would take about four months of intermittent sparring before Gillespie could again raise the same American flag originally flown over Los Angeles. Los Angeles was retaken without a fight on January 10, 1847. Following their defeat at the Battle of La Mesa, the Californio government signed the Treaty of Cahuenga, which ended the war in California on January 13, 1847. The main Californio military force, known as the Californio lancers, was disbanded. On January 16, 1847, Commodore Stockton appointed Frémont military governor of U.S. territorial California.

Some Californios fought on both sides of the conflict (U.S. and Mexico). The battlefield memorials attest to the heroic fight and loss on both sides.

==== Californio battles ====
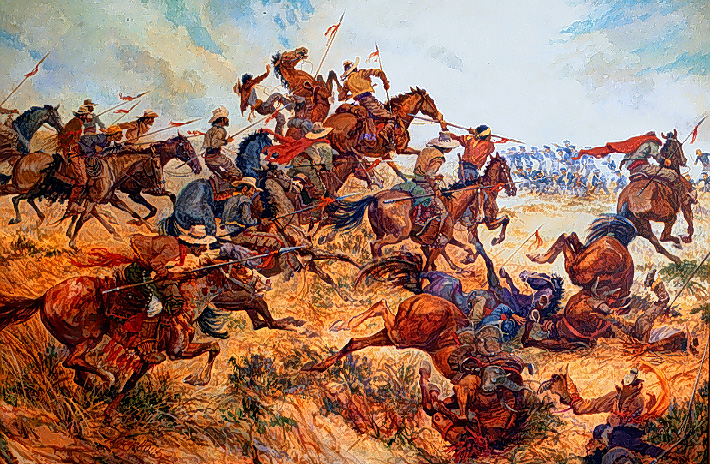
Battle of San Pasqual, a Californio victory led by General Andrés Pico against a superior American force led by General Stephen W. Kearny.

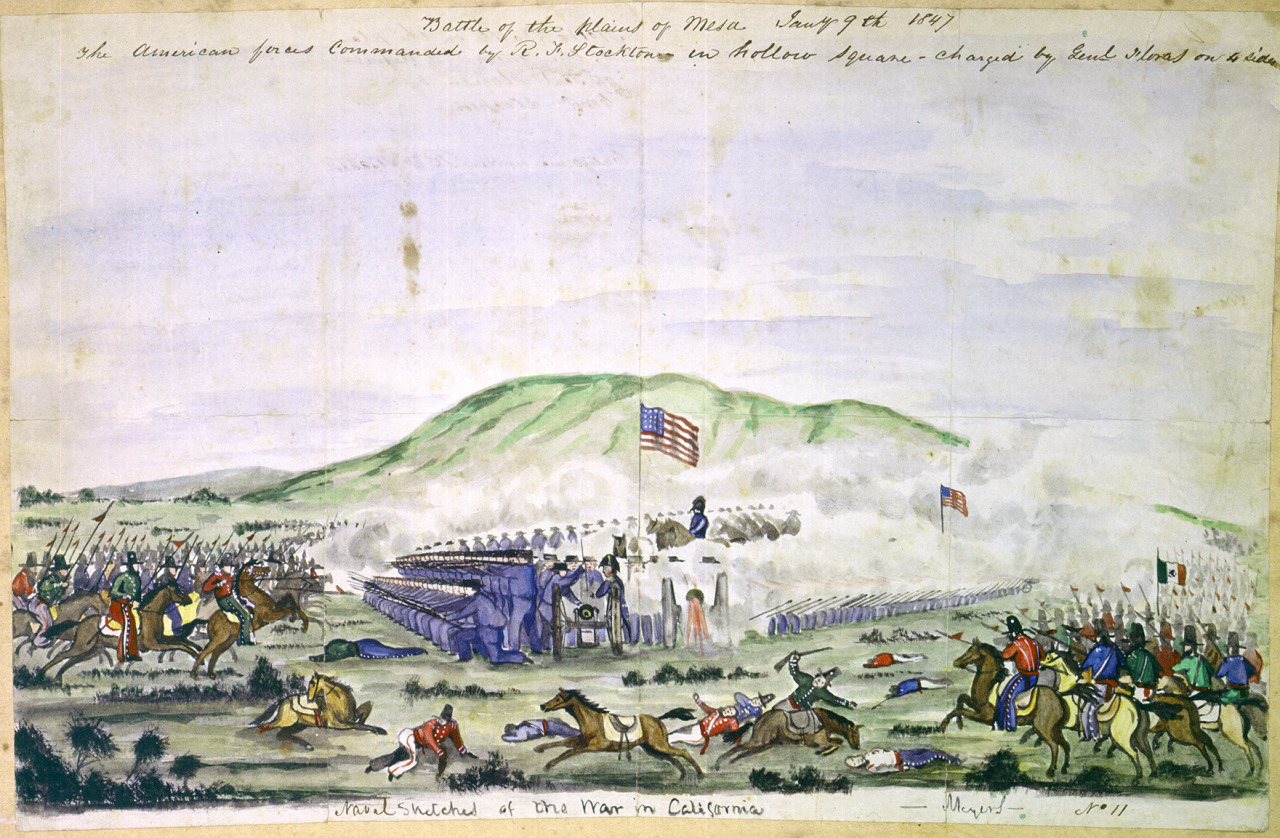
The Battle of La Mesa was the last major battle fought in the war.

Most towns in California surrendered without a shot being fired on either side. What little fighting that did occur usually involved small groups of disaffected Californios and small groups of soldiers, marines or militia.

- 1846
  - Battle of Dominguez Rancho, October 9, 1846. José Antonio Carrillo, near Los Angeles, led Californio forces against 350 marines and sailors who retreated.
  - Battle of San Pasqual, 6 December 1846. US Cavalry General Stephen Kearny's dragoons, after a grueling journey across New Mexico and the Mojave Desert, crossed into California with about 100 men and were joined by Kit Carson's 20 scouts and about 40 men under Gillespie north of San Diego. In a poorly thought out and uncoordinated attack with wet powder and worn out mules, Kearny lost around 19 of his men in a fight with about 150 Californio lancers led by Andrés Pico—brother of Pio Pico. Californio casualties are unknown. By the time reinforcements came from U.S. forces in San Diego, the Californio forces were already gone.
  - Temecula Massacre, December 1846. Californios and Cahuilla Indians combined to wipe out a party of Pauma Band Luiseño Indians responsible for a massacre of eleven Californios, near Temecula.
- 1847
  - January 5, 1847. Frémont near the San Buenaventura Mission, with about 400 men and six field pieces, dispersed a force of 60–70 Californio Lancers.
  - Battle of Rio San Gabriel, January 8, 1847. Stephen Kearny and Stockton's combined force of about 600 men (about a battalion equivalent) defeated the roughly 160-man Californio Lancer force near Los Angeles. Casualties were about one man on each side.
  - Battle of La Mesa, January 9, 1847. Kearny and Robert F. Stockton's combined US forces defeated the Californios in the final battle in California, at present day Montebello, east of Los Angeles. Casualties were about one man on each side.

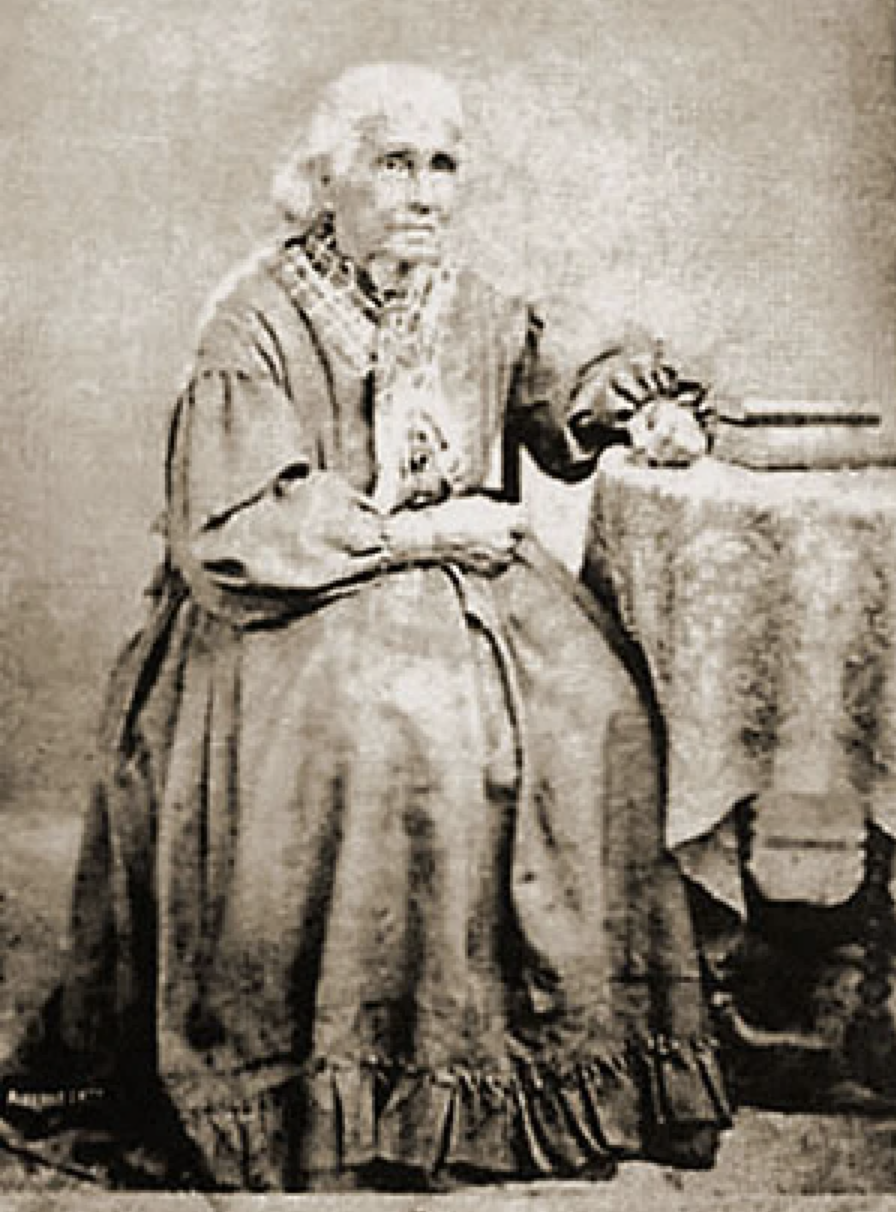
Bernarda Ruiz de Rodríguez allegedly brokered the Treaty of Cahuenga.

In late December, 1846, while Fremont was in Santa Barbara, Bernarda Ruíz de Rodriguez, a wealthy educated woman of influence and town matriarch, asked to speak with him. She advised him that a generous peace would be to his political advantage. Fremont later wrote of this 2-hour meeting, "I found that her object was to use her influence to put an end to the war, and to do so upon such just and friendly terms of compromise as would make the peace acceptable and enduring". The next day, Bernarda accompanied Fremont south.

On January 11, 1847, General Jose Maria Flores turned over his command to Andrés Pico and fled. On January 12, Bernarda went alone to Pico's camp and told him of the peace agreement she and Fremont had forged. Fremont and two of Pico's officers agreed to the terms for a surrender, and Jose Antonio Carrillo penned Articles of Capitulation in both English and Spanish. The first seven articles were almost entirely from Ruiz's suggestions. The story of Bernarda Ruiz is based largely on two short paragraphs and a footnote in Fremont's memoirs, first published in 1887. Many aspects of the story cannot be verified in primary source materials.

On January 13, at a deserted rancho at the north end of Cahuenga Pass (modern-day North Hollywood), John Fremont, Andres Pico and six others signed the Articles of Capitulation, which became known as the Treaty of Cahuenga. Fighting ceased, thus ending the war in California.

=== Californios after U.S. annexation ===
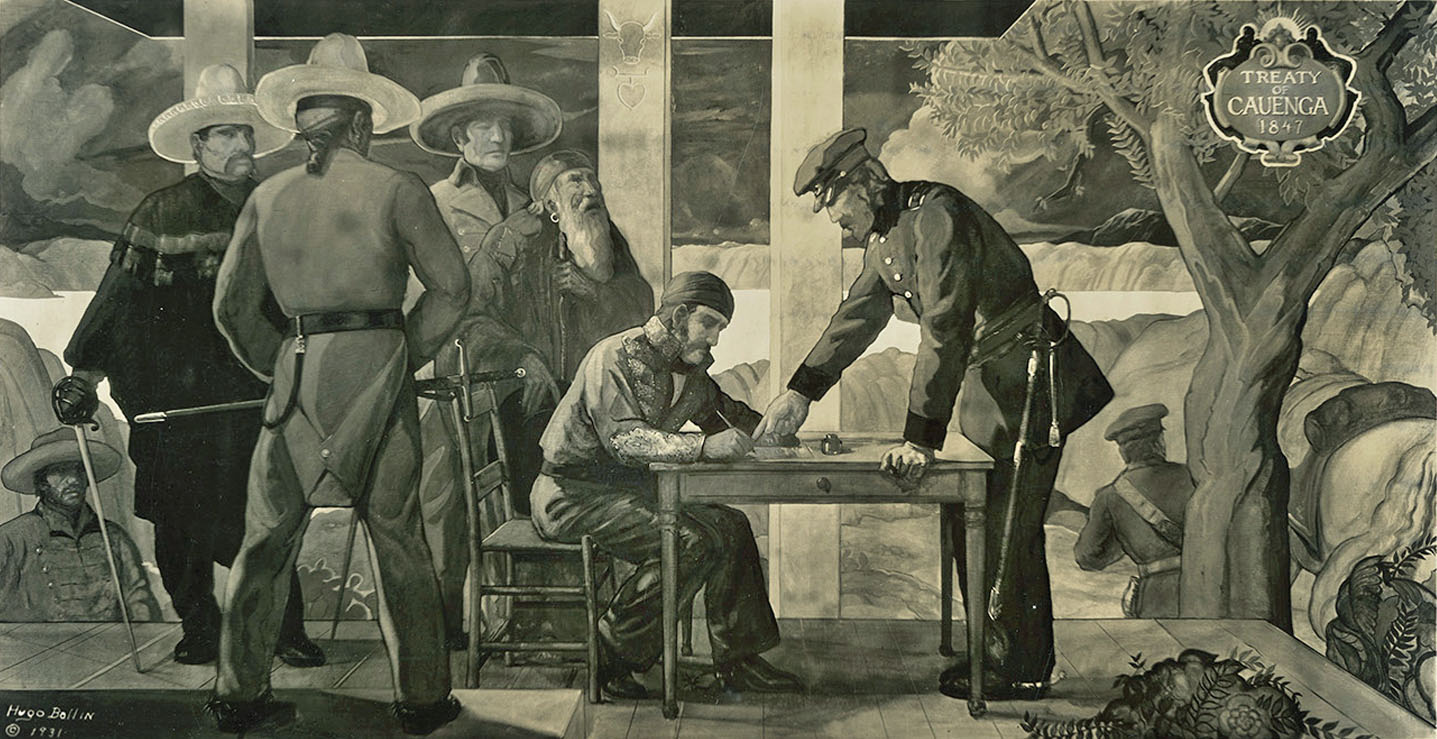
Signing of the Treaty of Cahuenga by Californio Andrés Pico and American John C. Frémont. The treaty ended the Mexican–American War in California.

In 1848, Congress set up a Board of Land Commissioners to determine the validity of Mexican land grants in California. California Senator William M. Gwin presented a bill that, when approved by the Senate and the House on March 3, 1851, became the California Land Act of 1851. It stated that unless grantees presented evidence supporting their title within two years, the property would automatically pass back into the public domain. Rancho owners cited the articles VIII and X of the Treaty of Guadalupe Hidalgo, wherein it guaranteed full protection of all property rights for Mexican citizens—with an unspecified time limit.

Many ranch owners, with their thousands of acres and large herds of cattle, sheep and horses, went on to live prosperous lives under U.S. rule. Former commander of the California Lancers Andrés Pico became a U.S. citizen after his return to California and acquired the Rancho Ex-Mission San Fernando ranch, which made up large part of what is present day Los Angeles. He went on to become a California State Assemblyman and later a California State Senator. His brother former governor of Alta California (under Mexican rule) Pío Pico also became a U.S. citizen and a prominent ranch owner/businessman in California after the war.

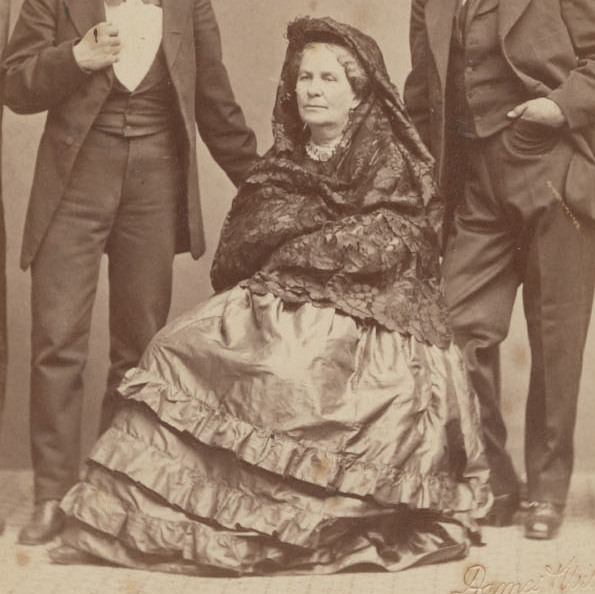
Angustias de la Guerra played a crucial role in defending women's property rights during the drafting of the California Constitution.

Many others were not so fortunate, as droughts decimated their herds in the early 1860s and they could not pay back the high cost mortgages (poorly understood by the mostly illiterate ranchers) they had taken out to improve their lifestyle and subsequently lost much or all of their property when they could not be repaid.

Californios did not disappear. Some people in the area still have strong identities as Californios. Thousands of people who are descended from the Californios have well-documented genealogies of their families.

The developing agricultural economy of California allowed many Californios to continue living in pueblos alongside Native peoples and other Mexicans well into the 20th century. These settlements grew into modern California cities, including Santa Ana, San Diego, San Fernando, San Jose, Monterey, Los Alamitos, San Juan Capistrano, San Bernardino, Santa Barbara, Arvin, Mariposa, Hemet and Indio.

From the 1850s until the 1960s, the Hispanics (of Spanish, Mexican and regional Native American origins) lived in relative autonomy. They practiced a degree of social racial segregation by custom, while maintaining Spanish-language newspapers, entertainment, schools, bars, and clubs. Cultural practices were often tied to local churches and mutual aid societies. At some point in the early 20th century, the official recordkeepers (census takers, city records, etc.) began grouping together all Californios, Mexicanos, and Native (Indio) peoples with Spanish surnames under the terms "Spanish", "Mexican", and sometimes, "colored"; some Californios even intermarried with Mexican Americans (those whose ancestors were refugees escaping the Mexican Revolution in 1910).

Alexander V. King has estimated that there were between 300,000 and 500,000 descendants of Californios in 2004.

==== California Gold Rush ====
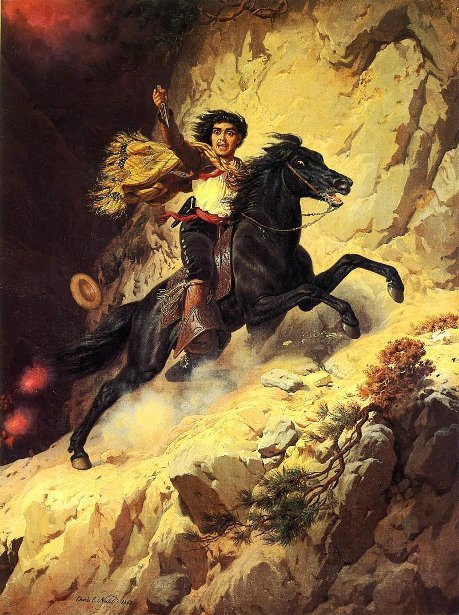
Joaquín Murrieta, called the "Robin Hood of California", was a notorious outlaw during the California Gold Rush. He served as inspiration for Zorro, the famed Californian bandit-hero.

In 1848, gold was discovered at Sutter's Mill, near Coloma, California. This discovery was made only nine days before the Treaty of Guadalupe Hidalgo was signed, which turned over California to the United States as a result of the Mexican–American War.

From the end of 1849 to the end of 1852, the population in California increased from 107,000 to 264,000 due to the California Gold Rush. In early 1849, approximately 6,000 Mexicans, many of whom were Californios who remained after the United States had annexed the territory, were prospecting for gold in the foothills of the Sierra Nevada. Although the territory they were in had up until recently been Mexican land, Californios and other Mexicans very quickly became the minorities and were seen as the foreigners. Once the Gold Rush had truly started in 1849, the campsites were segregated by nationality, further establishing the fact that "Americans" had taken the title as the majority ethnicity in Northern California. Because the Californio "foreigners" so quickly became a minority, their claims to land protected under the Treaty of Guadalupe Hidalgo were ignored when miners overran their land and squatted. Any protests by Californios were quickly put down by hastily formed Euro-American militias, so any legal protection provided by the new California legislature was ineffective when the threat of violence and lynchings loomed. Even if Californios were able to win their land back in court, lawyer's fees often cost large sums of land that left them with a fraction of their former wealth.

==== Working conditions ====
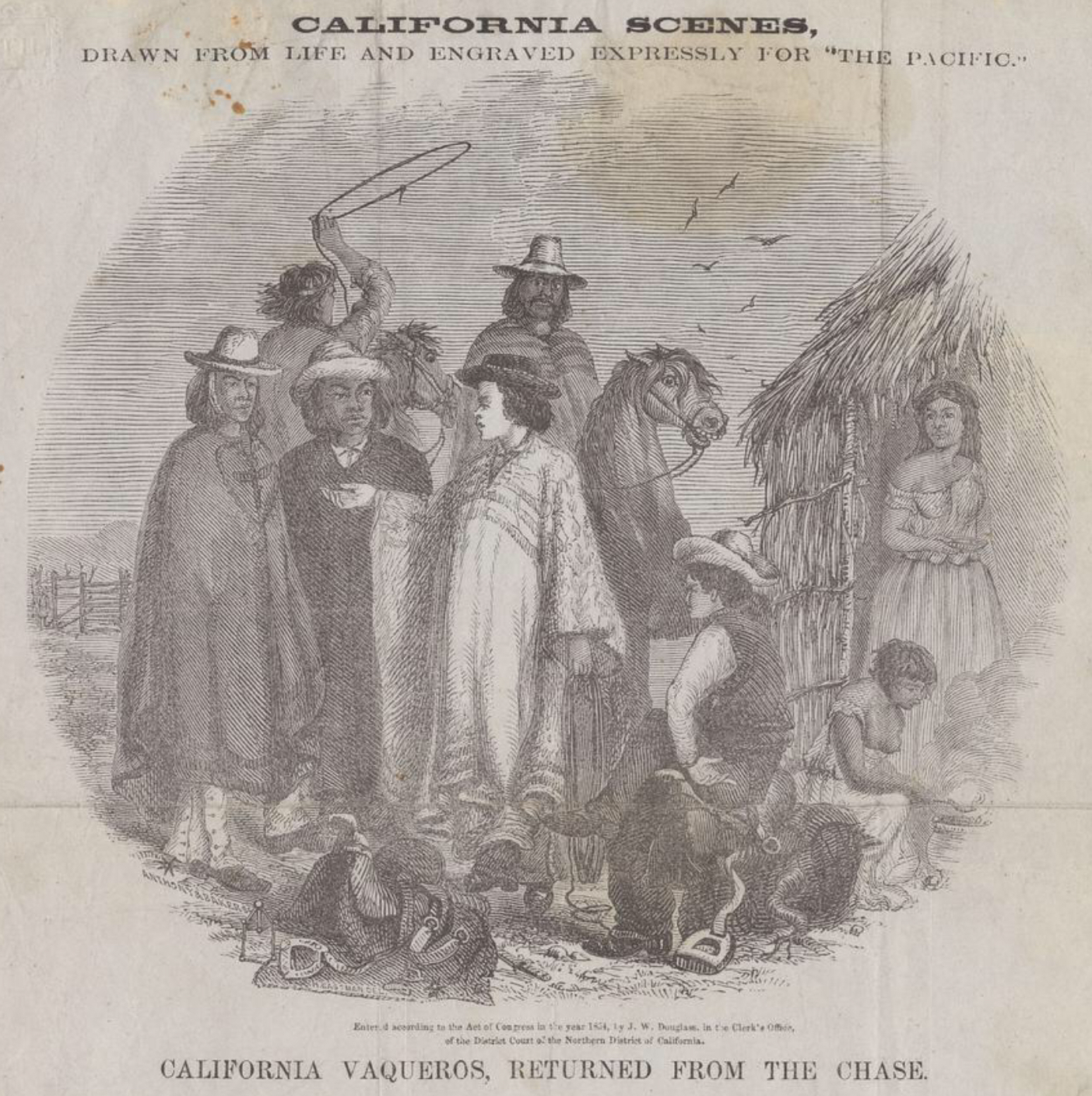
Californios faced discrimination by the growing Anglo-American population, even in traditionally dominant roles like vaqueros or miners.

Many Hispanic miners were experienced due to learning a "dry-digging" technique in the Mexican mining state of Sonora. Their early success initially drew praise and respect from Euro-American miners, until they eventually became jealous and used threats and violence to force Mexican workers out of their plots and into less lucrative ones. In addition to these informal forms of discrimination, Anglo miners also worked to establish Jim Crow-like laws to prevent Hispanics from mining altogether. In 1851, mob violence as well as the Foreign Miners' Tax discussed below forced between five thousand and fifteen thousand foreigners out of work in just a few months.

According to Antonio F. Coronel's accounts, there was systematic race-influenced violence conducted by Americans to force out Californios and other Hispanics. One account tells of a Frenchman and "un español" being lynched for supposed theft in 1848. Despite offers by Californios to replace the reported amount of gold stolen, they were still hanged. In addition, later in the Gold Rush, Coronel and his group found a rich vein of gold on the American River. When Euro-Americans caught wind of this, they invaded the claim armed and insisted it was their plot, forcing out Coronel and ending his mining career. Accounts like these show the harsh and violent living and working conditions that Californios were faced with during the Gold Rush. Discriminatory and racist treatment and laws as well as being so vastly outnumbered forced them out of their native lands despite assurances by the Treaty of Guadalupe Hidalgo that they could remain.

==== Foreign Miners' Tax ====
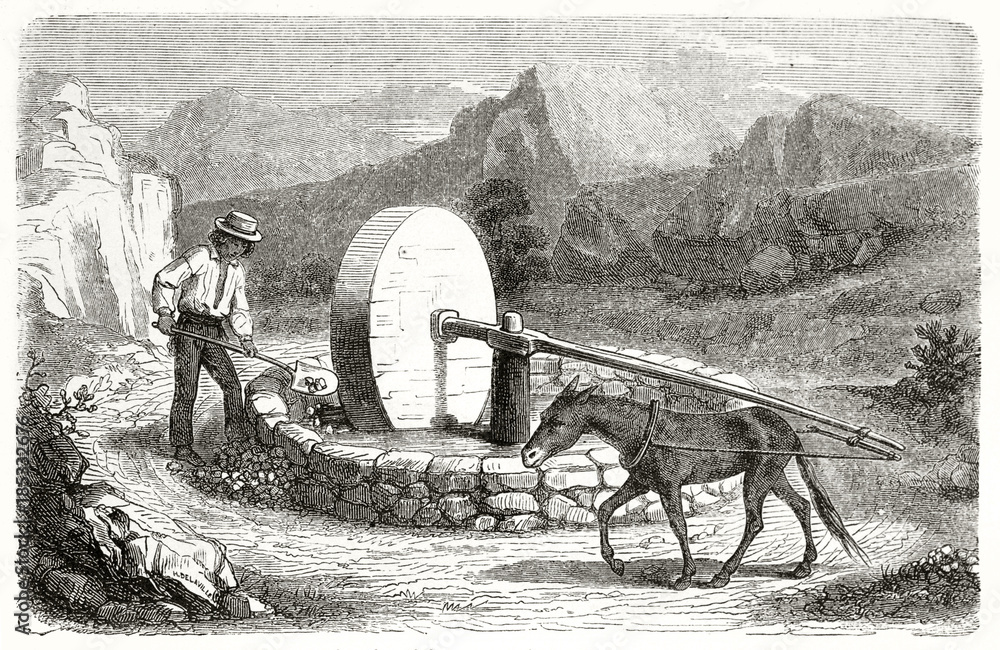
Californio miner processing ore during the California Gold Rush.

In response to the Mexican resistance to the American population, white miners called for something to be done about the "Sonoran" miner "problem". In response, in 1850, the Californian government introduced a tax on foreign miners who were working plots, called the Foreign Miners' Tax Law. The claimed purpose of the tax was to fund the government's efforts to protect the foreign workers. There are conflicting reports on the amount of the tax ranging from $20 to $30 per month.

This extremely high tax forced all but the most successful Latinos to stop mining as they were unable to obtain enough gold to make mining profitable. This left only the most successful of the Mexican prospectors, who ironically were the ones who drew the most ire from the Euro-American miners initially. By 1851, when the tax law was repealed, approximately two-thirds of the Latinos and Californios that had been living and working in mining areas had been driven out by the tax. After repealing the $20 or $30 per month tax, the California legislature instituted a much more reasonable $3 per month tax in 1852.

== Californio society and customs ==
=== Government ===
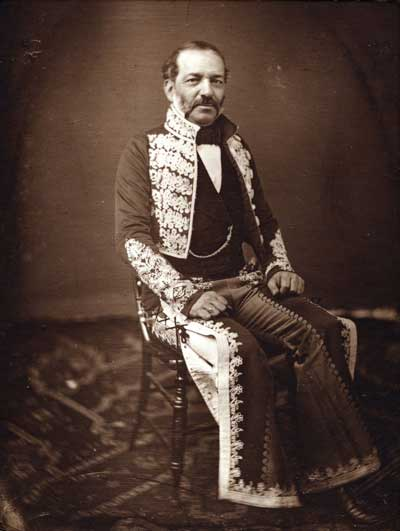
Andrés Pico, shown in 1850 in traditional Californio vaquero attire, served as a California State Senator and Adjutant General of California.

In the Spanish period, Alta California ("Upper California") was nominally controlled by a governor appointed by the Spanish government. The governors of California were at first appointed by the Viceroy (nominally under the control of the Spanish Crown).

After 1821 and Mexican independence, there were approximately 40 Mexican Presidents from 1821 to 1846. Their administrations appointed the governor. The costs of the minimal Alta California government were paid mainly from revenues of the roughly 40–100% import tariff collected at the entry port of Monterey.

The other center of Spanish power in Alta California was the Franciscan friars. As heads of 21 missions, they often resisted the powers of the governors. No Franciscan friar was a Californio, and their influence rapidly waned after Mexico secularized the missions in the 1830s.

The instability of the Mexican government (especially in its early years), Alta California's geographic isolation, the growing ability of Alta California's residents, including immigrants, to gain success; and an increase in the Californio population created a schism with the national government. As Spanish and Mexican period immigrants were surpassed in number by residents who had little affinity with the national government, the political and social environment enabled disagreement with the central government to form. Governors had little material support from the distant capital, Mexico City, and generally had to deal with Alta Californians themselves. Mexico-born governor Manuel Victoria was forced to flee in 1831, after losing a fight against a local uprising at the Battle of Cahuenga Pass.

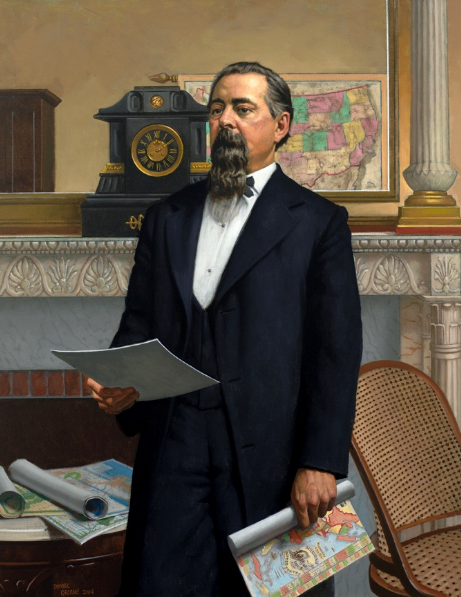
Romualdo Pacheco, the only Hispanic to serve as Governor of California since the U.S. Conquest of California, and the first Latino to represent a state in the U.S. Congress.

As Californios increasingly assumed positions of power in the Alta California government (including that of governor), rivalries emerged between northern and southern regions. Several times, Californio leaders attempted to break away from Mexico, most notably Juan Bautista Alvarado in 1836. Southern regional leaders, led by Pio Pico, made several attempts of their own to relocate the capital from Monterey to the more populated Los Angeles.

=== Foreigners ===
The independent minded Californios were also influenced by increasing numbers of immigrant foreigners (mostly English, Swiss, and French, English-speaking Americans being grouped with the "English", or Anglos) who entered the district becoming Mexican Citizens, and Californios by marriage. The Swiss immigrants remained neutral merchants in Yerba Buena, later known as San Francisco, from the 1830s onward able to practice Benedictine Roman Catholicism after emigrating from Switzerland during the Swiss Restoration Period. An increasing number of Swiss immigrants populated New Helvetia, under John Sutter, later on in 1841 with a land grant from then governor Juan Alvarado. Immigrants assimilated with the Californios, becoming Mexican citizens and gaining land either independently granted to them or through marriage to Californio women. They also began to be active in local politics.

For example, American Abel Stearns was an ally of the Californio José Antonio Carrillo in the 1831 Victoria incident, yet sided with the southern Californians against the Californio would-be governor Alvarado in 1836. Alvarado recruited a company of riflemen from Tennessee, many of them former trappers who had settled in the Monterey Bay area. The company was led by another American, Isaac Graham. When the Americans refused to fight against fellow Americans, Alvarado was forced to negotiate a settlement.

=== Ethnicity ===
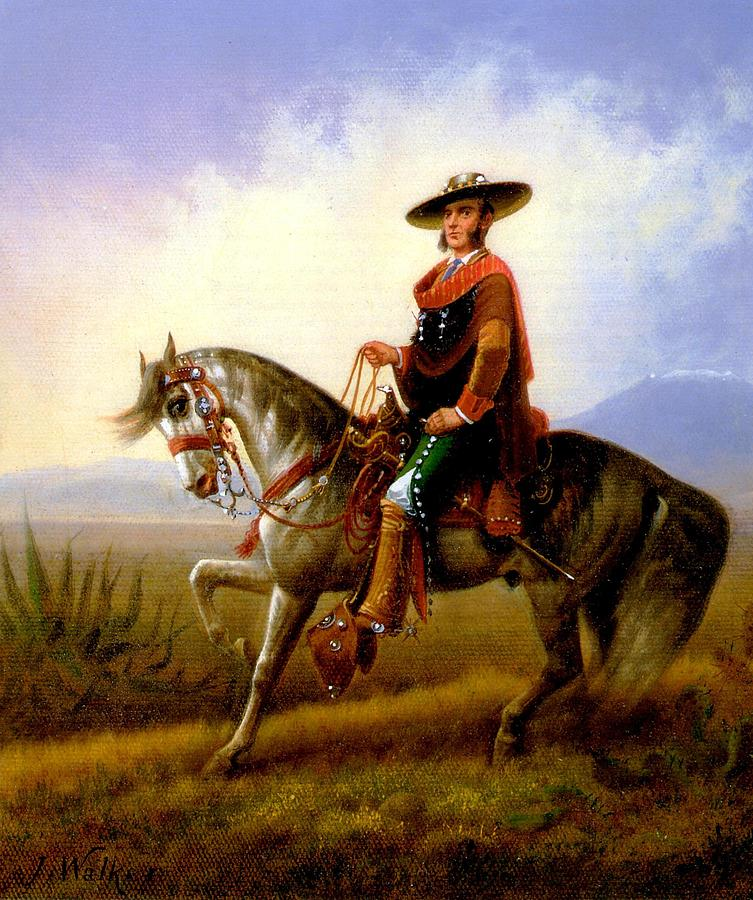
Portrait of a mounted Californio vaquero in traditional clothing

Californios included the descendants of agricultural settlers and retired escort soldiers deployed from what is modern-day Mexico. Most were of mixed ethnicities, usually Mestizo (Spanish and Native American) or mixed African and Amerindian backgrounds.

Despite the depictions of popular American 20th-century TV shows such as Zorro, few Californios were of "pure" Spanish (Peninsular or Criollo) ancestry. Persons who were most likely to be native-born Spanish or of Spanish ancestry were Franciscan priests, and career government officials and military officers who had limited assignments in California.

According to mission records (marriage, baptisms, and burials) and Presidio roster listings, several "leather-jacket" soldiers (soldados de cuero), operating as escorts, mission guards, and other military duty personnel were described as europeo (i.e., born in Europe), while most civilian settlers were classified as of mixed origins (coyote, mulatto, etc.). The current term mestizo was rarely used in mission records: more common terms were indio, europeo, mulato, coyote, castizo, and other caste terms.

An example of European-born soldiers are the twenty-five from Lieutenant Pedro Fages detachment of Catalan Volunteers. Most of the soldiers on the Portola-Serra expedition of 1769 and the de Anza expeditions of 1774 and 1775 were recruited from Spanish Army infantry regiments then stationed in Mexico. Many were assigned to garrison the presidios, and retired at the end of their ten-year enlistments. Numerous veterans settled in California. Because of the demographic bias in this period toward men among the Spanish, some men who stayed in California married native Californian women who had converted to Christianity at the missions.

=== Women in Californio society ===
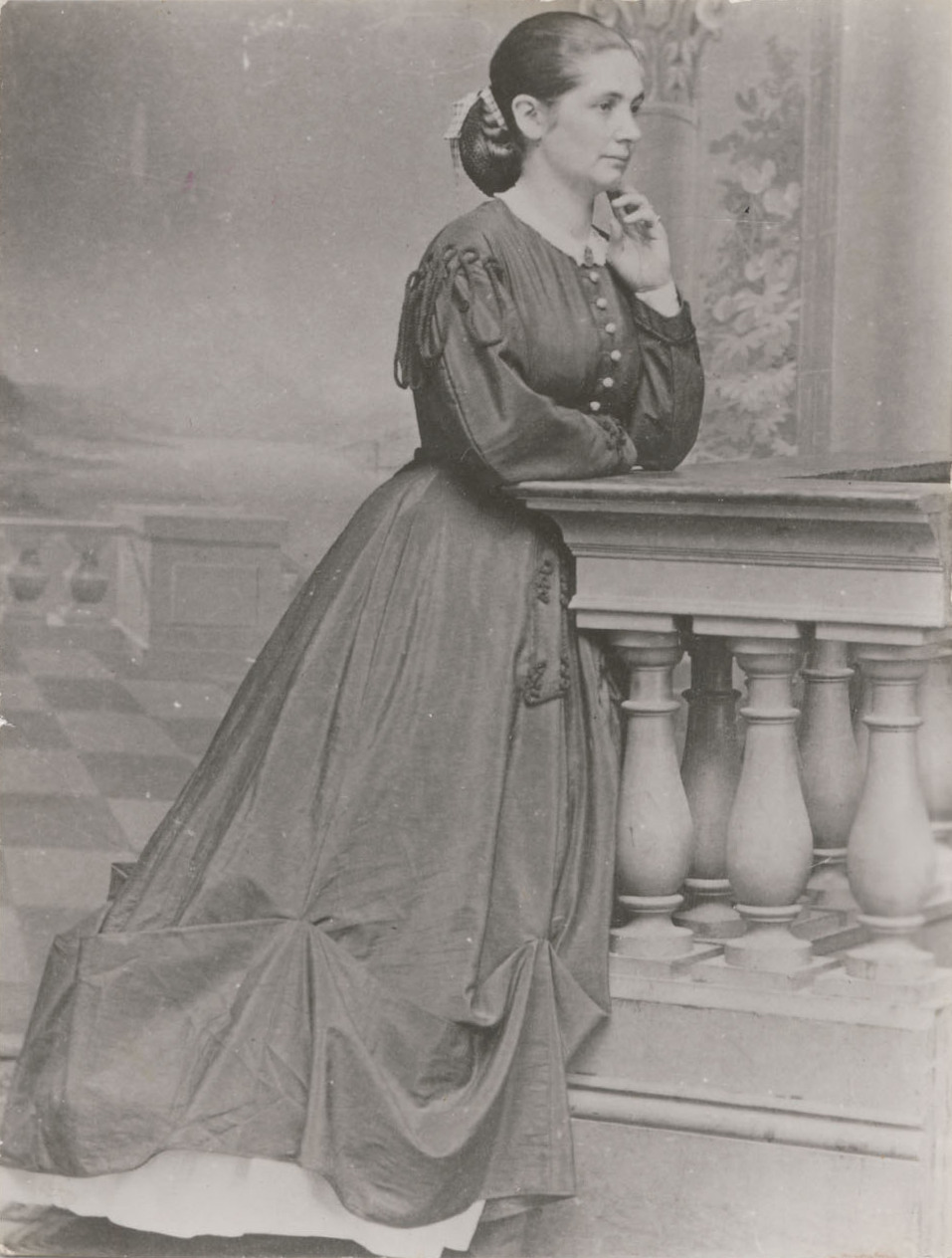
Epifania de Guadalupe Vallejo, the earliest known photographer active in what is the present-day West Coast of the United States.

The social life of Californio society was extremely important in both politics and business, and women played an important part in these interactions. They helped facilitate such interactions for their husbands, and therefore themselves, in order to advance in the social and political power in Californio society. Men sought women with high social skills, as they understood the power women could have on family and social dealings.

In movies and television accounts of this period have portrayed women as romanticized, characterized by their beauty and fun-loving nature. They have also been shown as raised to be very sheltered and protected.

As women played a key role in the development of Alta California, they continued in this role as it changed from a Mexican territory to a United States possession. As foreign, non-Spanish speaking men moved into California, those who wished to join the upper echelons of the established social hierarchy began to use marriage with women of established Californio families as a way to join the elite. Intermarriages between Californios and foreigners had been common during the time of Mexican rule and these increased after the 1848 American annexation and Gold Rush in California. Such marriages combined the cultures of American settlers and merchants with that of the declining Californio society. As Americans increased in number, however, they pushed out Californios from power in California.

=== Family and education ===
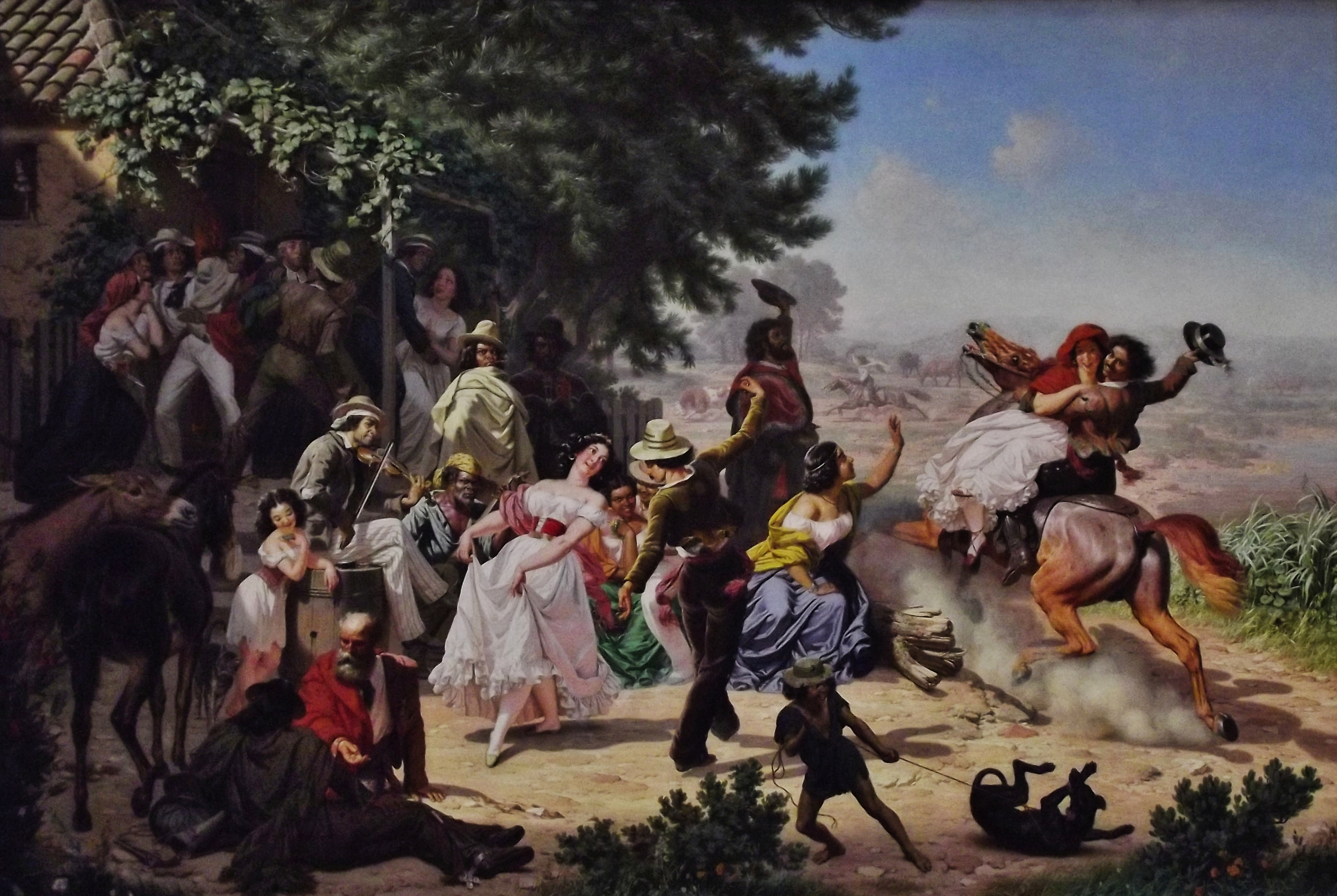
The Fandango depicts a fiesta of Californios dancing the fandango. (Painted in 1873 by Charles Christian Nahl)

The family was characteristically patriarchal; sons were expected to defer to fathers for all their lives. Women had full rights of property ownership and control unless she was married or had a living father; the males had almost complete control of all family members. Individual families of means paid to have their children educated, with by priests or private tutors. Few early immigrants knew how to read or write, so only a few hundred inhabitants could.

=== Settlement ===
The Spanish colonial government, and later, Mexican officials encouraged through recruitment civilians from the northern and western provinces of Mexico such as Sonora. This was not well received by Californios, and was one of the factors leading to revolt against Mexican rule. Sonorans came to California despite the area's isolation and the lack of central government support. Many of the soldiers' wives considered California to be a cultural wasteland and a hardship assignment.

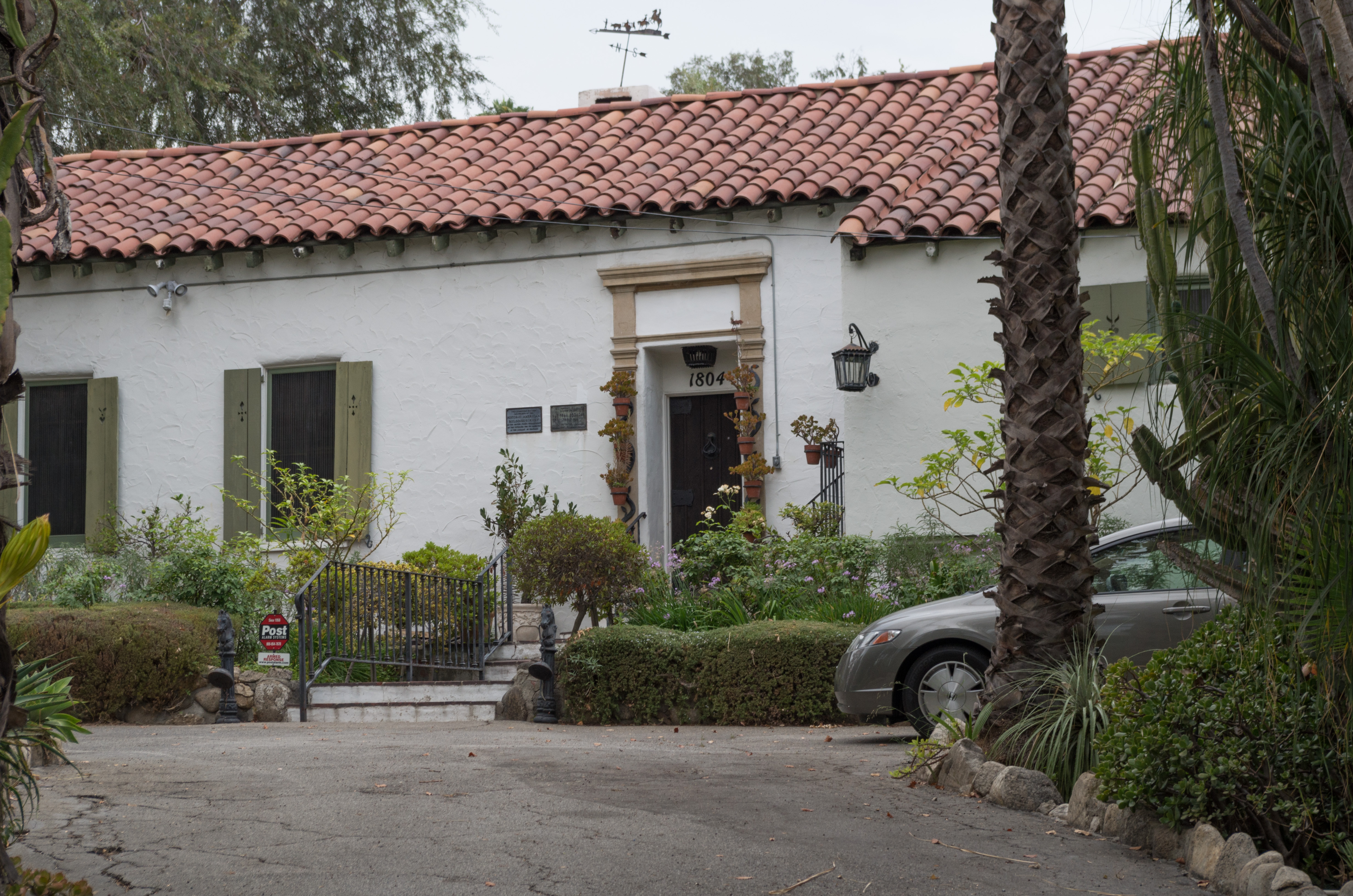
The Adobe Flores was built 1838–45 by Governor José María Flores on Rancho San Pascual.

An incentive for the soldiers that remained in California after service was the opportunity to receive a land grant that probably was not possible elsewhere. This made most of California's early settlers military retirees with a few civilian settlers from Mexico. Since it was a frontier society, the initial rancho housing was characterized as rude and crude—little more than mud huts with thatched roofs. As the rancho owners prospered these residences could be upgraded to more substantial adobe structures with tiled roofs. Some buildings took advantage of local tar pits (La Brea Tar Pits in Los Angeles) in an attempt to waterproof roofs. Restorations of these today often suffer from a perception that results in a grander representation than if they had been constructed during the Californio period. The Californio population was 10,000 in 1845, estimated.

=== Ranchos ===
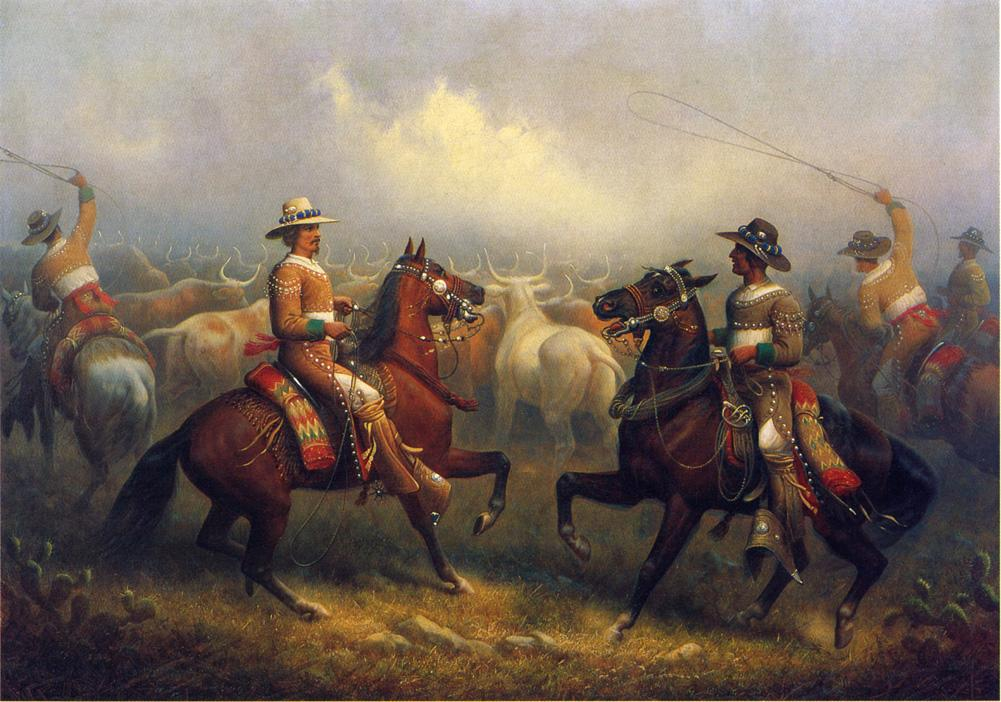
Californio vaqueros in 1875.

In practice nearly all mission property and livestock became about 455 large Ranchos of California granted by the Californio authorities. The Californio rancho owners claimed about 8,600,000 acres (35,000 km^{2}) averaging about 18,900 acres (76 km^{2}) each. This land was nearly all originally mission land within about 30 miles (48 km) of the coast. The Mexican-era land grants by law were provisional for five years in order for the terms of the law to reasonably be fulfilled. The boundaries of these ranchos were not established as they came to be in later times predominately based on what could be understood as figurative boundaries. They were based on just where another granted owner considered the end of their land, lands or vegetation landmarks. Conflict was bound to occur when these land grants were reviewed under United States control. Title to some grants under United States control were rejected based on questionable documents especially when with predated documents, that could have been created post-United States occupancy in January 1847.

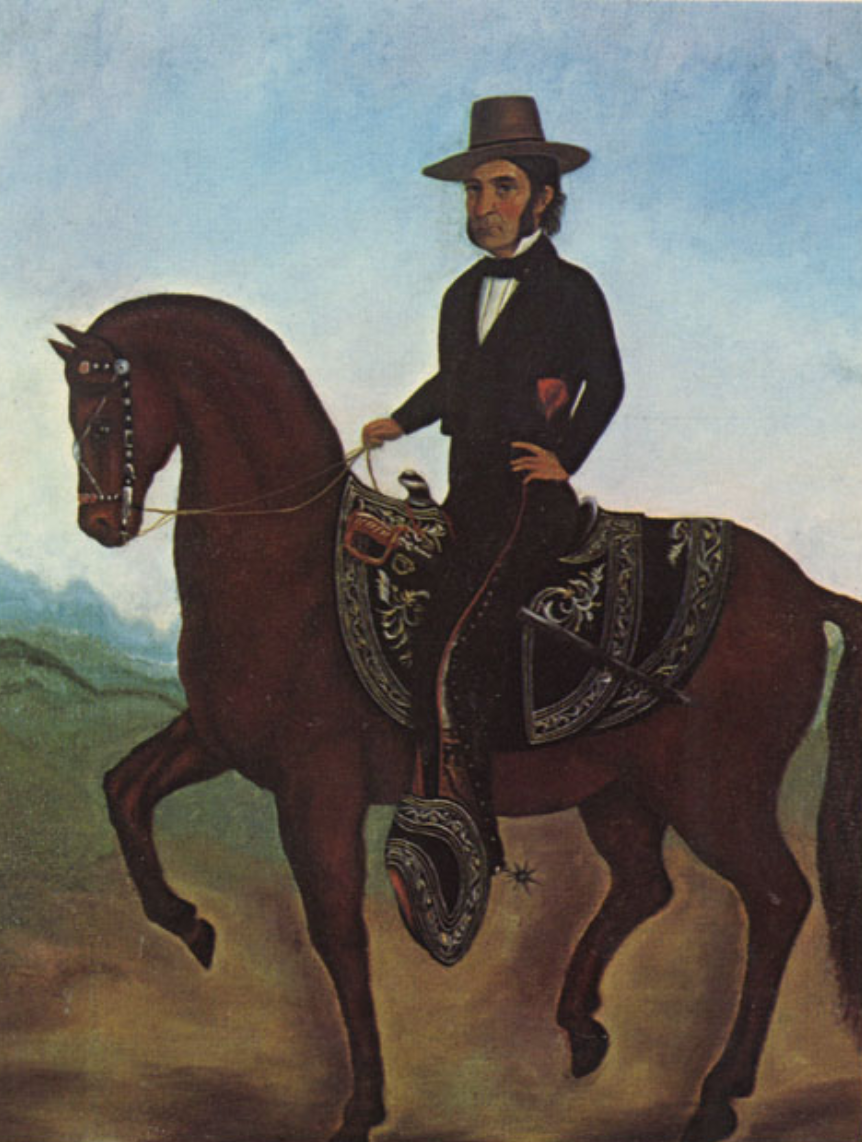
José Andrés Sepúlveda, one of California's most famed vaqueros.

After agriculture, cattle, sheep and horses were established by the California Missions, friars, soldiers and Mission Indians, the rancho owners dismissed the friars and the soldiers and took over the mission lands and livestock starting in 1834—the Mission Indians were left to survive however they could. The rancho owners tried to live in a grand style they perceived of the wealthy hidalgos in Spain. They expected the non-rancho owning population to support this lifestyle. Nearly all males rode to where ever they were going at nearly all times making them excellent riders. They indulged in many fiestas, fandangos, rodeos and roundups as the rancho owners often went from rancho to rancho on a large horse bound party circuit. Weddings, christenings, and funerals were all "celebrated" with large gatherings.

Before Mexican independence in 1821, 20 "Spanish" land grants had been issued (at little or no cost) in all of Alta California; many to "a few friends and family of the Alta California governors". The 1824 Mexican General Colonization Law established rules for petitioning for land grants in California; and by 1828, the rules for establishing land grants were codified in the Mexican Reglamento (Regulation). The Acts sought to break the monopoly of the Catholic Franciscan missions and possibly entice increased Mexican settlement.

When the missions were secularized in 1834–1836 mission property and livestock were supposed to be mostly allocated to the Mission Indians. Historical research shows that the majority of rancho grants were given to retired non-commissioned soldiers. The largest grants to Nieto, Sepúlveda, Domínguez, Yorba, Ávila, Grijalva, and other founding families were examples of this practice.

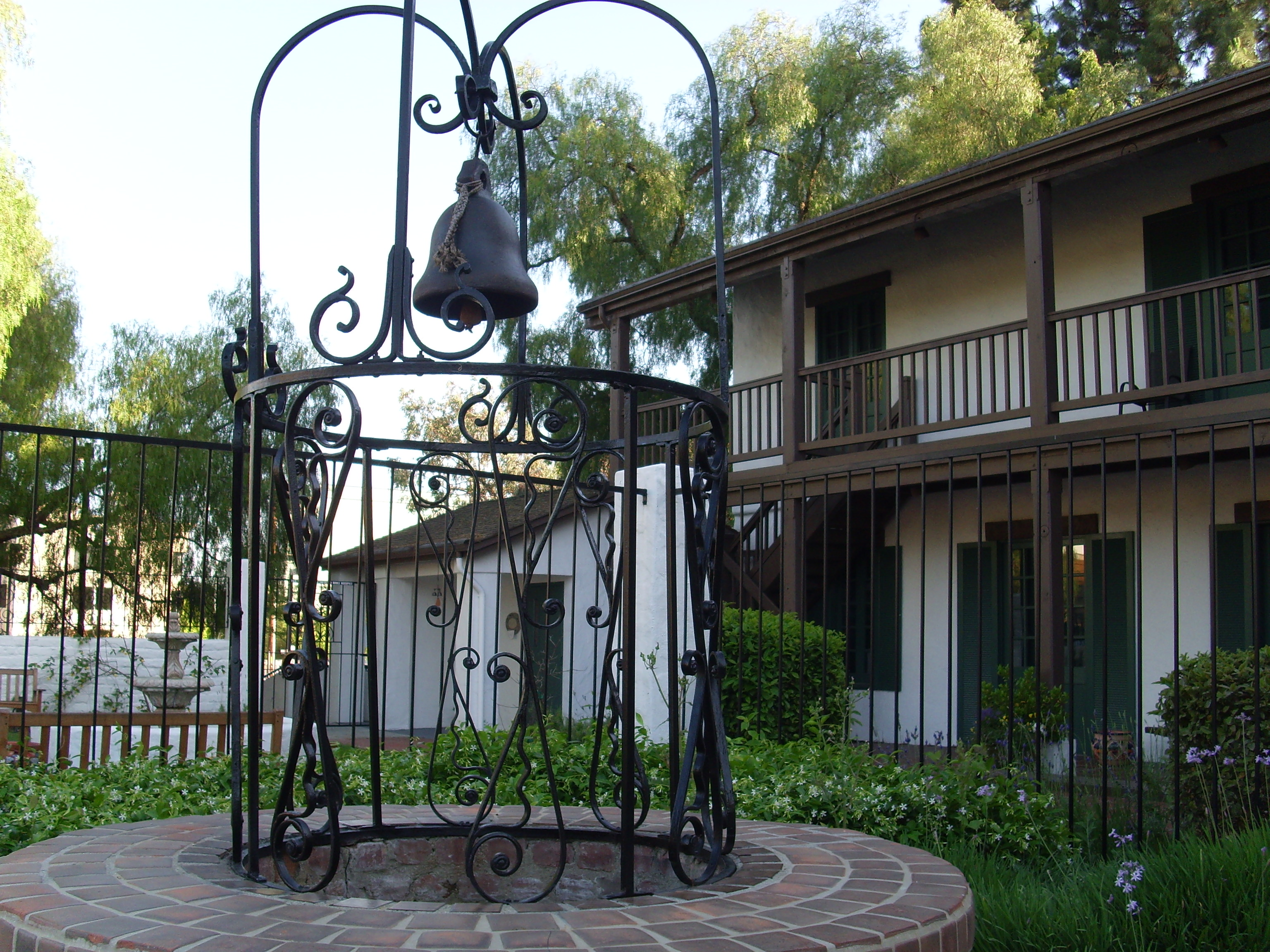
Pacheco Adobe at Rancho Monte del Diablo is one of the numerous ranchos of California that are today California Historical Landmarks.

Many of the foreign residents also became rancho grantees. Some were "Californios by marriage" like Stearns (who was naturalized in Mexico before moving north) and the Englishman William Hartnell. Others married Californios but never became Mexican citizens. Rancho ownership was possible for these men because, under Spanish/Mexican law, married women could independently hold title to property. In the Santa Cruz area, three Californio daughters of the inválido José Joaquín Castro (1768–1838) married foreigners yet still received grants to Rancho Soquel, Rancho San Agustin and Rancho Refugio.

=== Taxation ===
Since the government depended on import tariffs (also called Custom duties and ad-valorem taxes) for its income there was virtually no property tax. Under Spanish/Mexican rule, all landowners were expected to the diezmo, a compulsory tithe to the Catholic Church of one tenth of the fruits of agriculture and animal husbandry, business profits or salaries. Priest salaries and mission expenses were paid out of this money and/or collected goods.

The mandatory Diezmo ended with the secularization of the missions, greatly reducing rancho taxes until the U.S. takeover. Today's state property tax system makes large self-supporting cattle ranches uneconomical in most cases.

=== Horses in Californio culture ===
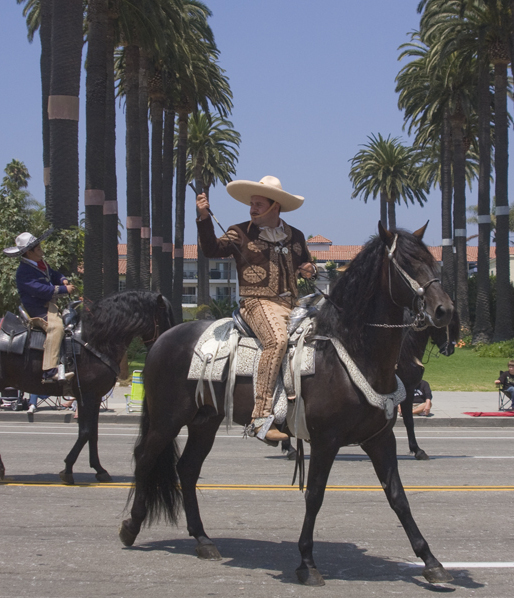
Modern charro at the annual Old Spanish Days fiesta in Santa Barbara.

Horses were plentiful and often left, after being broken in, to wander around with a rope around their necks for easy capture. It was not unusual for a rider to use one horse until it was exhausted, before switching its bridle to another horse—letting the first horse free to wander. Horse ownership for all except a few exceptional animals were almost community property. Horses were so common and of so little use that they were often destroyed to keep them from eating the grass needed by the cattle. California Indians later developed a taste for horse flesh as food and helped keep the number of horses under control. An unusual use for horses was found in shucking wheat or barley. The wheat and its stems were cut from the gain fields by Indians bearing sickles. The grain with its stems still attached was transported to the harvesting area by solid wheeled ox-cart (nearly the only wheeled transport in California) and put into a circular packed earth corral. A herd of horses was then driven into the same corral or "threshing field". By keeping the horses moving around the corral their hoofs would, in time, separate the wheat or barley from the chaff. Later the horses would be allowed to escape and the wheat and chaff were collected and then separated by tossing it into the air on a windy day so as to let the wind carry the chaff away. Presumably the wheat was washed before use to remove some of the dirt.

=== Indigenous Californian workforce ===
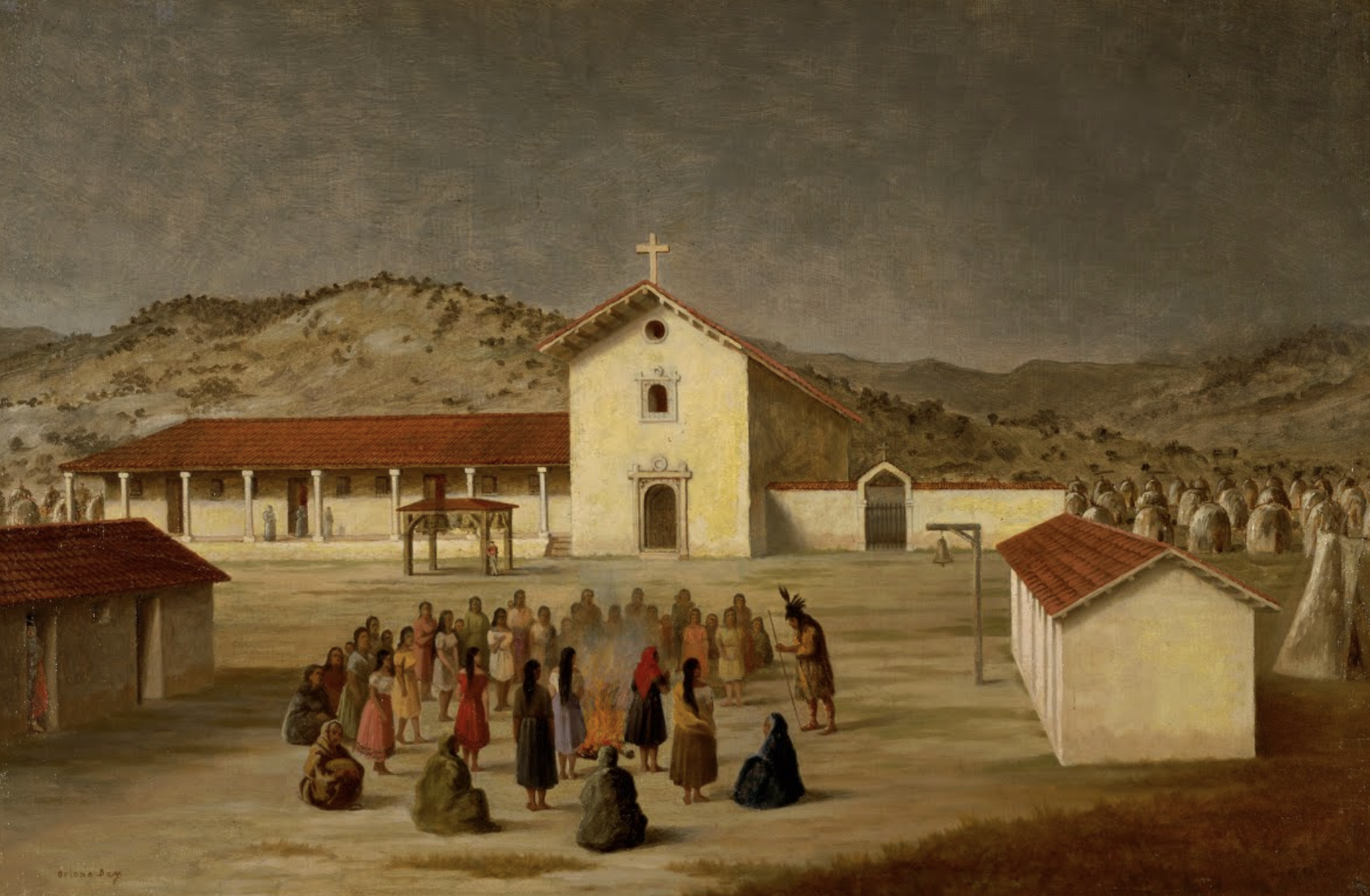
Mission San Francisco Solano was the last Californian mission to be founded, in 1823 in Sonoma.

For these very few rancho owners and their families, this was the Californio's Golden Age, although for all the others much different. Much of the agriculture, vineyards and orchards established by the Missions were allowed to deteriorate as the rapidly declining mission Indigenous Californian population went from over 80,000 in 1800 to only a few thousand by 1846. Fewer Native Americans meant less food was required and the Franciscan Friars and soldiers supporting the missions disappeared after 1834 when the missions were abolished (secularized). After the Friars and soldiers disappeared, many of the Native Americans deserted the missions and returned to their tribes or found work elsewhere. The new ranchos often gave work to some of the former mission Native Americans. The "Savage tribes" worked for room, board and clothing (and no pay). The former mission Indians performed the majority of the work herding cattle, planting and harvesting the ranchos' crops. The slowly increasing ranchos and Pueblos at Los Angeles, San Diego, Monterey, Santa Cruz, San Jose and Yerba Buena (now San Francisco) mostly only grew enough food to eat and to trade. The exceptions were the cattle and horses growing wild on unfenced range land. Originally owned by the missions they were killed for their hides and tallow.

=== Traditional food and materials ===
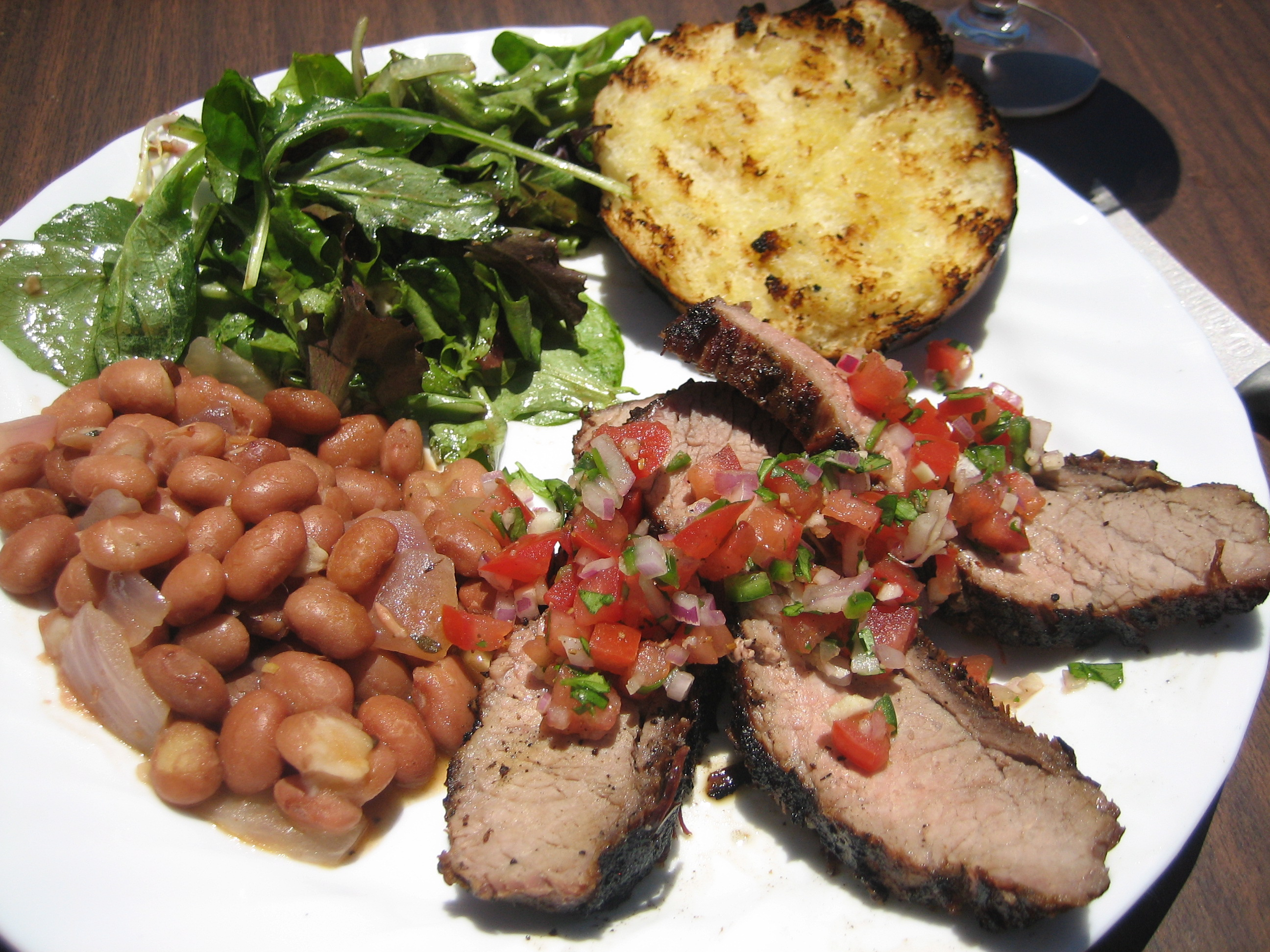
Santa Maria–style barbecue, a traditional culinary legacy of Californios in the Santa Maria Valley.

Beef was a common constituent of most Californio meals and since it couldn't be kept long in the days before refrigeration, beef was often slaughtered to get a few steaks or cuts of meat. The property and yards around the ranchos were marked by the large number of dead cow heads, horns or other animal parts. Cow hides were kept later for trading purposes with Yankee or British traders who started showing up once or twice a year after 1825. Beef, wheat bread products, corn, several types of beans, peas and several types of squash were common meal items with wine and olive oil used when they could be found.

The mestizo population probably subsisted mostly on what they were used to: corn or maize, beans, and squash with some beef donated by the rancho owners. What the average Native Americans ate is unknown since they were in transition from a hunter gatherer society to agriculturalists. Formerly, many lived at least part of the year on ground acorns, fish, seeds, wild game, etc. It is known that many of the ranchers complained about 'Indians' stealing their cattle and horses to eat.

Leather, one of the most common materials available, was used for many products, including saddles, chaps, whips, window and door coverings, riatas (leather braided rope), trousers, hats, stools, chairs, bed frames, etc. Leather was even used for leather armor where soldiers' jackets were made from several layers of hardened leather sewn together. This stiff leather jacket was sufficient to stop most Indian arrows and worked well when fighting the Indians.

=== Trade ===
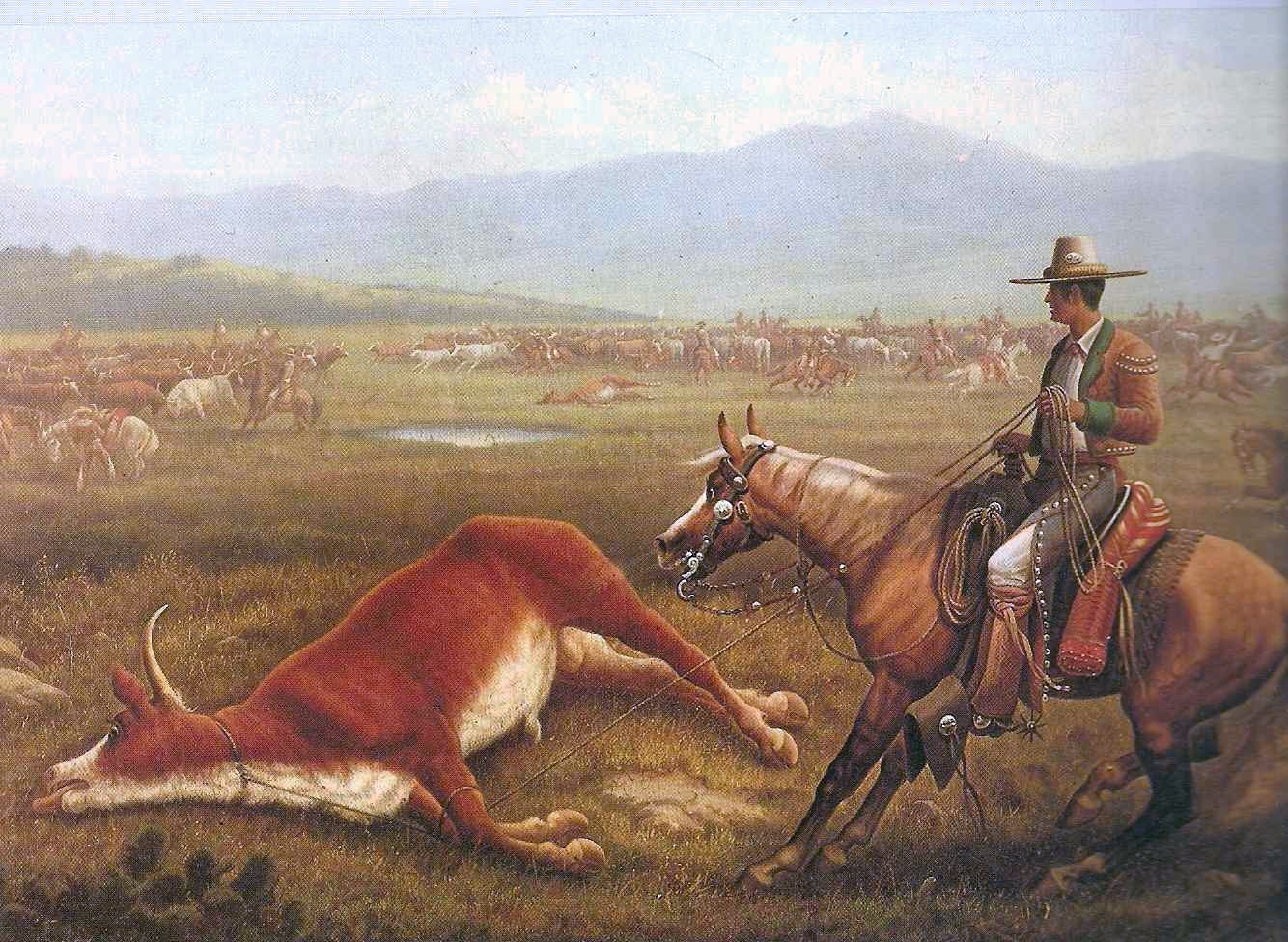
A Californio rancher takes in cattle, a duty that would begin the process of the California Hide Trade.

From about 1769 to 1824 California averaged about 2.5 ships per year with 13 years showing no ships coming to California. These ships brought a few new settlers and supplies for the pueblos and Missions. Under the Spanish colonial government rules, trade was actively discouraged with non-Spanish ships. The few non-Native American people living in California had almost nothing to trade—the missions and pueblos were subsidized by the Spanish government. The occasional Spanish ships that did show up were usually requested by Californios and had Royal permission to go to California—bureaucracy in action. Prior to 1824, when the newly independent Mexico liberalized the trade rules and allowed trade with non-Mexican ships, the occasional trading ship or U.S. whaler that put into a California port to trade, get fresh water, replenish their firewood and obtain fresh meat and vegetables became more common. The average number of ships from 1825 to 1845 jumped to twenty-five ships per year versus the 2.5 ships per year common for the prior fifty years.

The rancho society had few resources except large herds of Longhorn cattle which grew well in California. The ranchos produced the largest cowhide (called California Greenbacks) and tallow business in North America by killing and skinning their cattle and cutting off the fat. The cowhides were staked out to dry and the tallow was put in large cowhide bags. The rest of the animal was left to rot or feed the California grizzly bears that were common in California. With something to trade, and needing everything from nails, needles and almost anything made of metal to fancy thread and cloth that could be sewn into fancy cloaks or ladies' dresses, etc., they started trading with merchant ships from Boston, Massachusetts, Britain and other trading ports in Europe and the East Coast of the United States. The trip from Boston, New York City, or Liverpool, England averaged over 200 days one way. Trading ships and the occasional whaler put into San Diego, San Juan Capistrano, San Pedro, San Buenaventura (Ventura), Monterey and Yerba Buena (San Francisco) after stopping and paying the import tariff of 50–100% at the entry port of Monterey, California. These tariffs or custom fees paid for the Alta California government. The classic book Two Years Before the Mast (originally published 1840) by Richard Henry Dana Jr. gives a good first-hand account of a two-year sailing ship sea trading voyage to Alta California which he took in 1834–1835. Dana mentions that they also took back a large shipment of California longhorn horns. Horns were used to make a large number of items during this period.

California was not alone in using the import duty to pay for its government as the U.S. import tariffs at this time were also the way the United States paid for most of its Federal Government. A U.S. average tariff (also called custom duties and ad valorem taxes) of about 25% raised about 89% of all Federal income in 1850.

== Californios in literature ==
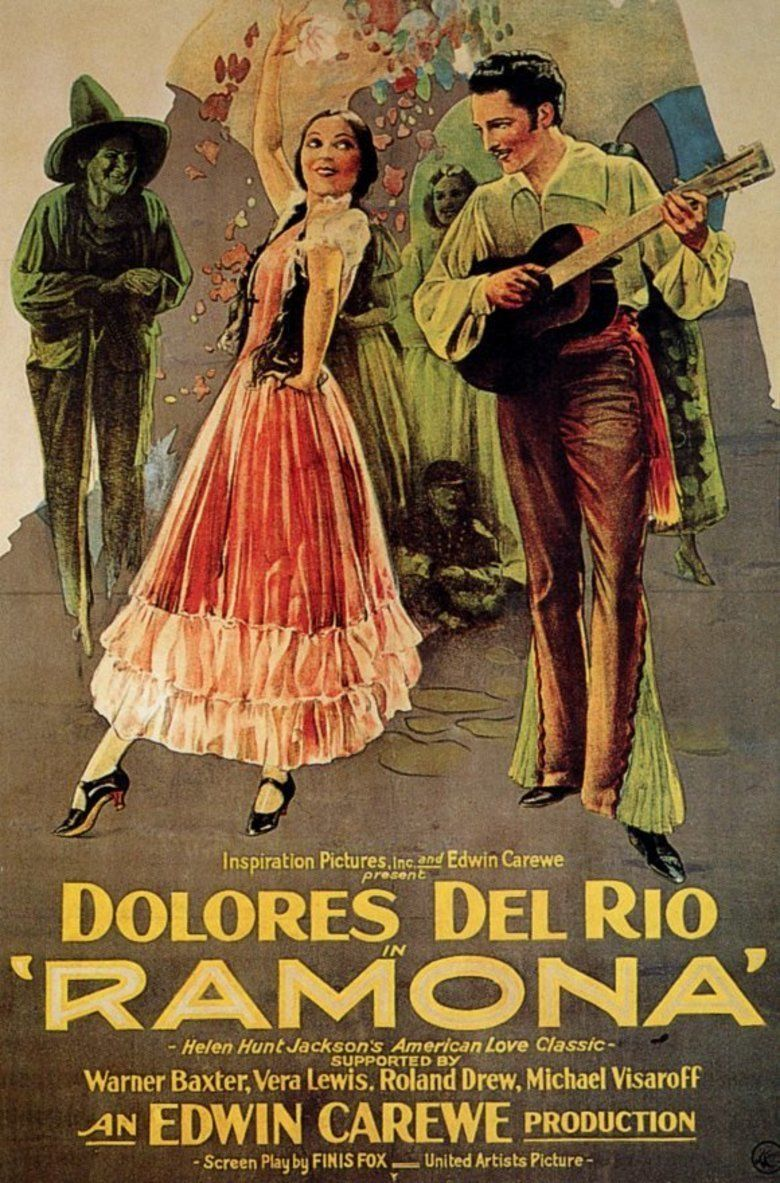
Ramona, written in 1884 by Helen Hunt Jackson, is one of the most famous literary depictions of Californio culture after the American conquest. Shown is the poster for the 1928 film adaptation starring Dolores del Río.

- A portrayal of Californio culture is depicted in the novel Ramona (1884), written by Helen Hunt Jackson.
- The fictional character of Zorro has become the most identifiable Californio due to novels, short stories, motion pictures and the 1950s television series. The historical facts of the era are sometimes lost in the story-telling.
- Richard Henry Dana Jr., recounted aspects of Californio culture which he saw during his 1834 visit as a sailor in Two Years Before the Mast.
- Joseph Chapman, a land realtor noted as the first Yankee to reside in the old Pueblo de Los Angeles in 1831, described Southern California as a paradise yet to be developed. He mentions a civilization of Spanish-speaking colonists, "Californios", who thrived in the pueblos, the missions, and ranchos.
- The Squatter and the Don, a novel by María Ruiz de Burton set in 1880s California, depicts a wealthy Californio family's legal struggles with immigrant squatters on their land. The novel was based on the legal struggles of General Mariano G. Vallejo, a friend of the author. The novel depicts the legal process by which Californios were often "relieved" of their land. This process was long (most Californios spent up to 15 years defending their grants before the courts), and the legal fees were enough to make many Californios landless. Californios resented having to pay land taxes to United States officials, because the principle of paying taxes for land ownership did not exist in Mexican law. In some cases Californios had little available capital, because their economy had operated on a barter system; they often lost land because of the inability to pay the taxes. They could not compete economically with the European and Anglo-American immigrants who arrived in the region with large amounts of cash.
- Alejandro Murguía (1949-) speaks of growing up in the 20th century playing in the ruins of Missions and his family history as Californios in The medicine of memory : a Mexica clan in California.
- The Hidalgos Bride (2019) by Genevieve Turner is a historical romance about the arranged marriage between a Californio rancher of Morisco descent and a Mexican city woman. The book details frontier life and the often political and social division between the locals and the Catholic priests of the missions.

== Notable Californios ==
=== Prominent families ===
- Ávila family of California
- Berryessa family of California
- Boronda family of California
- Careaga family of California
- Carrillo family of California
- Estudillo family of California
- Guerra family of California
- Lugo family of California
- Pico family of California
- Sepúlveda family of California

== See also ==
=== Culture, race and ethnicity ===
- Hispanics
- Neomexicano in New Mexico
- Tejano in Texas
- Chicanos
- Chileans in the California gold rush
- Mexican Americans
- Spanish Americans
- Isleños
- Floridanos
- Spaniards in Mexico
- Spanish language in California

=== History and government ===
- History of California before 1900
- Provincias Internas
- Conquest of California

== Bibliography ==
- Beebe, Rose Marie and Robert M. Senkewicz (2001). Lands of Promise and Despair: Chronicles of Early California, 1535–1846. Berkeley: Heyday Books. ISBN 978-1-890771-48-5.
- Beebe, Rose Marie and Robert M. Senkewicz (2006). Testimonios: Early California through the Eyes of Women, 1815–1848. Berkeley: Heyday Books, The Bancroft Library and the University of California.
- Bouvier, Virginia Marie (2001). Women and the Conquest of California, 1542–1840: Codes of Silence. Tucson: University of Arizona Press. ISBN 978-0-8165-2446-4
- Casas, María Raquél (2007). Married to a Daughter of the Land: Spanish-Mexican Women and Interethnic Marriage in California, 1820–1880. Reno: University of Nevada Press. ISBN 978-0-87417-697-1
- Chávez-García, Miroslava (2004). Negotiating Conquest: Gender and Power in California, 1770s to 1880s. Tucson: University of Arizona Press. ISBN 978-0-8165-2378-8
- Gostin, Ted (2001). Southern California Vital Records, Volume 1: Los Angeles County 1850–1859. Los Angeles: Generations Press. ISBN 978-0-9707988-0-0
- Haas, Lisbeth (1995). Conquests and Historical Identities in California, 1769–1936, Berkeley: University of California. ISBN 978-0-520-08380-6 online at Google Books
- Heidenreich, Linda (2007). "This Land was Mexican Once": Histories of Resistance from Northern California. University of Texas Press. ISBN 978-0-292-71634-6
- Hugues, Charles (1975). "The decline of the Californios: The Case of San Diego, 1846–1856", The Journal of San Diego History, Summer 1975, Volume 21, Number 3
- Hurtado, Albert L. (1999). Intimate Frontiers : Sex, Gender, and Culture in Old California. Albuquerque : University of New Mexico Press. ISBN 978-0-8263-1954-8
- Mason, William Marvin (1998). The Census of 1790: A Demographic History of California, Menlo Park, California: Ballena Press. ISBN 978-0-295-98083-6
- Monroy, Douglas. Thrown Among Strangers: The Making of Mexican Culture in Frontier California. University of California Press 1993. ISBN 978-0-520-08275-5
- Osio, Antonio Maria; Rose Marie Beebe and Robert M. Senkewicz (1996) The History of Alta California : A Memoir of Mexican California. Madison: University of Wisconsin Press. ISBN 978-0-299-14974-1
- PBS (2006). The Gold Rush. PBS.
- Pitt, Leonard and Ramón A. Guttiérrez (1998). Decline of the Californios: A Social History of the Spanish-Speaking Californians, 1846–1890 (New edition), Berkeley: University of California Press. ISBN 978-0-520-21958-8
- Ruiz de Burton, María Amparo; Rosaura Sánchez and Beatrice Pita (2001). Conflicts of Interest: The Letters of María Amparo Ruiz de Burton. Houston: Atre Publico Press. ISBN 978-1-55885-328-7
- Sánchez, Rosaura (1995). Telling Identities: The Californio Testimonios. Minneapolis: University of Minnesota Press. ISBN 978-0-8166-2559-8
- The editors of Time-Life Books (1976). The Spanish West. New York: Time-Life Books.
- Thomas, Adrianna (2009). Latino and Asian Americans in the California Gold Rush. Columbia University Academic Commons.
- Umbeck, John (1977). The California Gold Rush: A Study of Emerging Property Rights. Academic Press, Inc.
