= Battle of Río San Gabriel =

1847 battle of the Mexican-American War

- Part of the Conquest of California; Mexican–American War
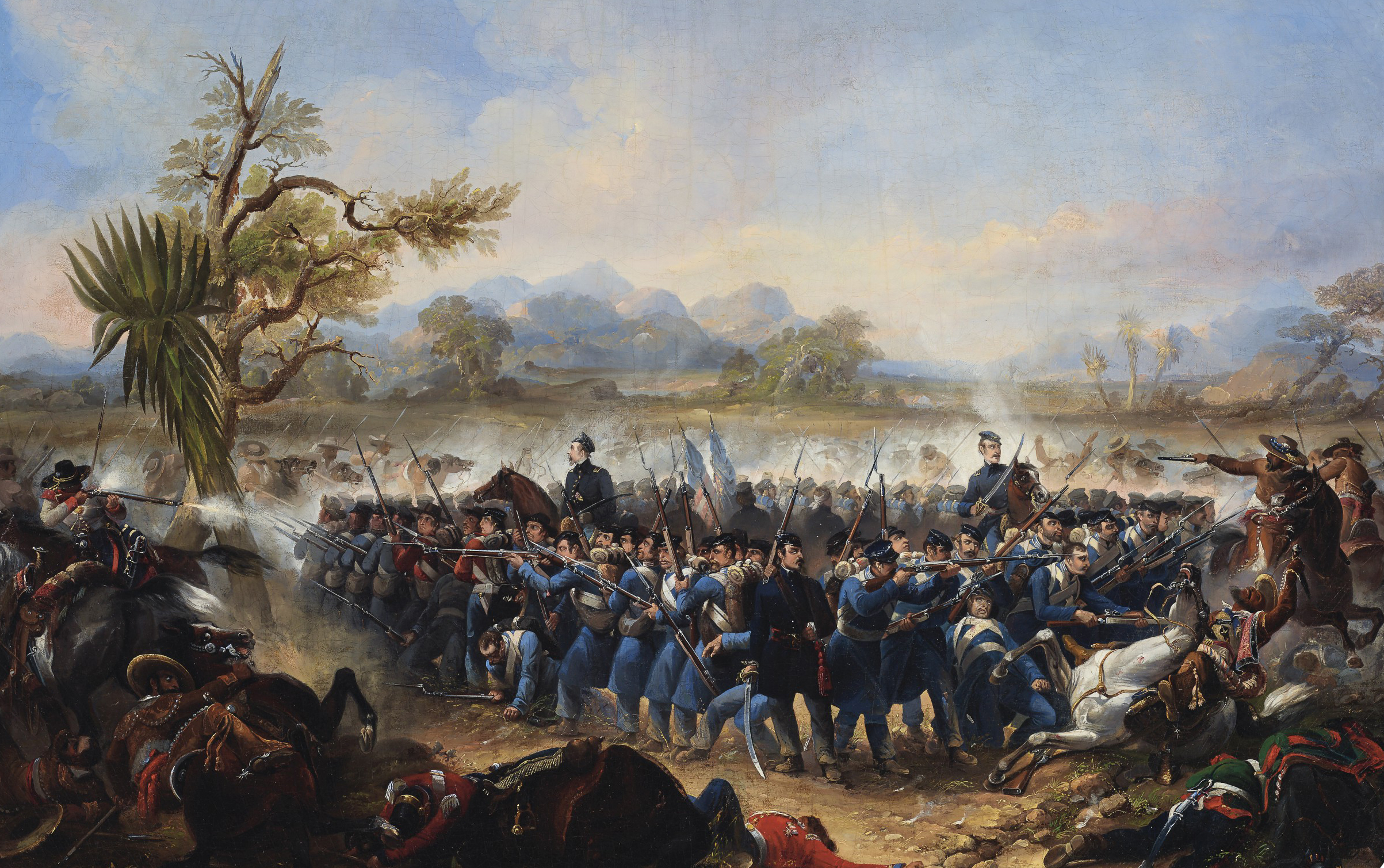
- Painting by James Walker (19th c.)
Date	8 January 1847
Location	San Gabriel River near Los Angeles, California (present day Montebello, Pico Rivera, and Whittier)
Result	American victory

Belligerents
United States	Mexico

Commanders and leaders
(United States) Stephen W. Kearny (United States) Robert F. Stockton	José María Flores

Strength
500–607; 2 howitzer	~350

Casualties and losses
2–3 killed 9–12 wounded	2–3 killed 9–12 wounded

California Historical Landmark
- Official name: Río San Gabriel Battlefield
- Reference no.: 385

The Battle of Río San Gabriel was fought on 8 January 1847 during the California campaign of the Mexican–American War. It took place at a ford of the San Gabriel River, at what are today parts of the cities of Whittier, Pico Rivera and Montebello, about ten miles south-east of downtown Los Angeles.

== Background ==
After the Battle of San Pasqual, the battered Army of the West, commanded by General Stephen W. Kearny, went to the headquarters of Commodore Robert F. Stockton at San Diego, California. Stockton's next objective was to recapture Pueblo de Los Angeles. That settlement had been previously captured by Stockton's forces but was left in the command of Captain Archibald Gillespie and had been lost to the Californio militia, commanded by General José María Flores in the Siege of Los Angeles that Fall. Stockton's force, which included six cannons this time, left San Diego on 28–29 December.

Kearny and Stockton initially disputed the right of command. Although Kearny had superior orders from the United States War Department, he had previously sent most of his troops back to Santa Fe, New Mexico, believing that the war in California had ended, and his remaining force sustained heavy losses at the Battle of San Pasqual. Stockton had a larger force and was familiar with the area, so Kearny did not initially dispute Stockton's command of the campaign to recapture Los Angeles.

== Battle ==
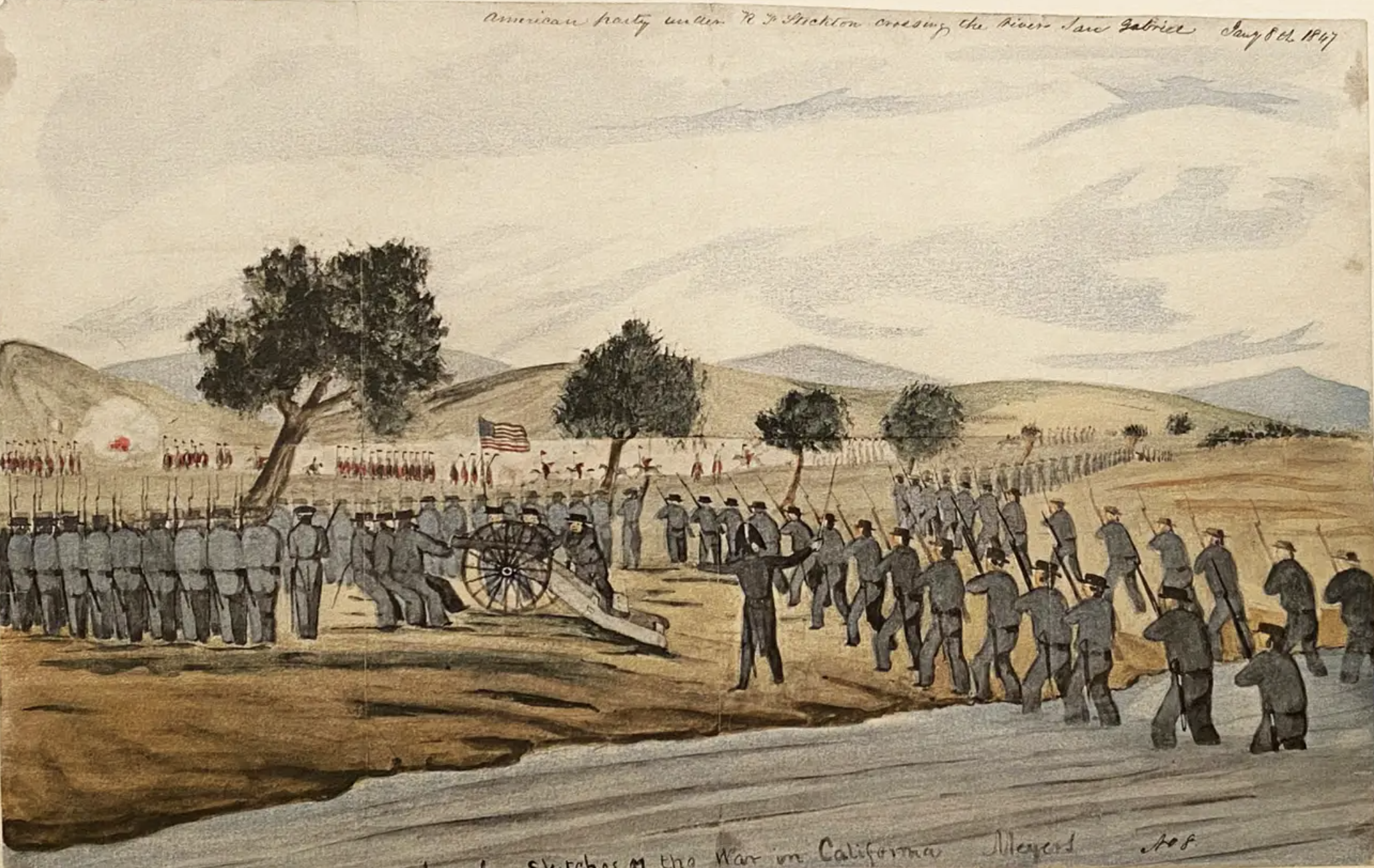
1847 depiction of the battle by William H. Meyers

U.S. scouts discovered the Mexican position at a key ford along the San Gabriel River on January 7, 1847. Approaching from the south, Stockton and Kearny planned a crossing for the next day. The U.S. forces had formed into a hollow square with the artillery and baggage in the center. Kearny ordered the artillery unlimbered to cover the crossing, but Stockton countered the order and began to move across the river. The crossing proved to be especially difficult because Flores was in a good position to contest the crossing from the high banks across the river, and the ford had patches of quicksand at the bottom of the knee deep water.

At approximately 2 pm, the Americans formed into a square when two miles from the river with the baggage and cattle in the middle, and sent skirmishers ahead. Flores attacked the square with horses, which failed, plus his makeshift ammunition and inadequate gunpowder proved to be ineffective. The U.S. officers and men manhandled their cannon across while the forward quarter of the square took cover on the river edge. Stockton personally helped unlimber and direct the artillery, which silenced both Californio cannons.

Kearny led and commanded the assault force while Stockton stayed with the guns. The left flank of the square took a Californio riverbank position and held it against a counterattack from militia lancers shouting "viva Los Californios". Then the whole square charged forward shouting "New Orleans, New Orleans", in honor of Andrew Jackson's victory against Great Britain there that day thirty-one years before. The charge took the heights, and Flores withdrew his smaller force. The battle had lasted an hour and a half.

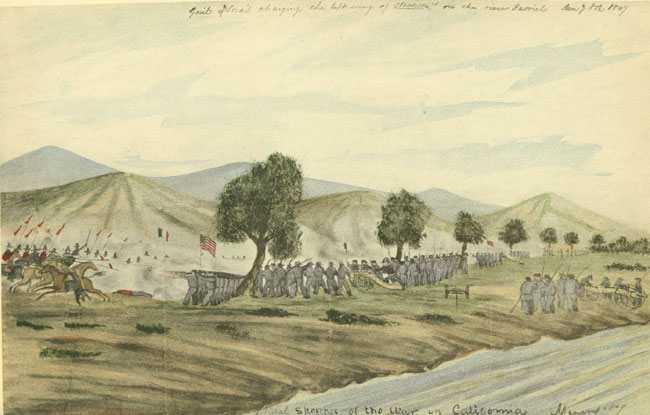
Depiction by William H. Meyers

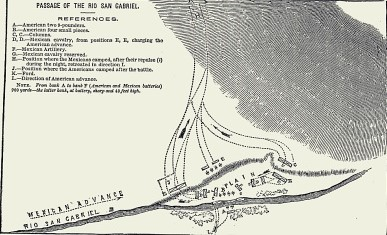
Map of the battle

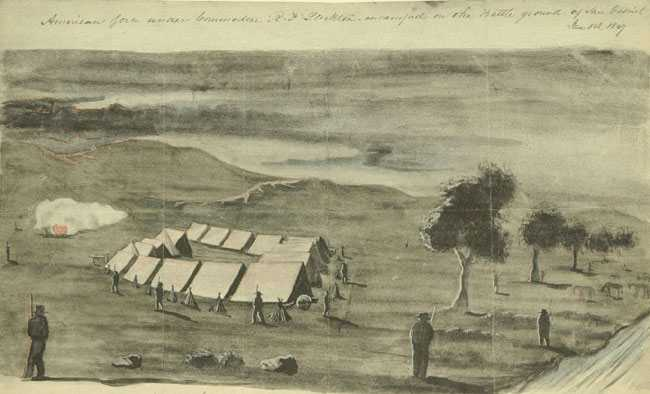
The American encampment near the San Gabriel River.

General Kearny's official report of the battle:

Headquarters Army of the West, Ciudad de Los Angeles, Upper California, January 12, 1847.

SIR, -- I have the honor to report, that at the request of Commodore R. F. Stockton (who in September last assumed the titled of Governor of California), I consented to take command of an expedition to this place – capital of the country – and that on the 29th of December, I left San Diego with about five hundred men, consisting of sixty dismounted dragoons, under Captain Turner; fifty California volunteers, and the remainder of marines and sailors, with a battery of artillery. Lieutenant Emory, topographical engineers, acted as assistant adjutant-general. Commodore Stockton accompanied us. We proceeded on our route without seeing the enemy till the 8th instant, when they showed themselves in full force of six hundred mounted men, with four pieces of artillery, under their Governor Flores, occupying the heights in front of us, which commanded the crossing of the river San Gabriel, and they ready to oppose our further progress. The necessary disposition of our troops was immediately made, by covering our front with a strong party of skirmishers, placing our wagons and baggage train in rear of them, and protecting the flanks and rear with the remainder of the command. We then proceeded, forded the river, carried the heights, and drove the enemy from them after an action of about one and a half hours, during which they made a charge upon our left flank, which was repulsed; soon after which, they retreated and left us in possession of the field, on which we encamped that night.

The next day, the 9th instant, we proceeded on our march at the usual hour, the enemy in front and on our flanks, and when we reached the plains of the Mesa, their artillery again opened upon us, when their fire was returned by our guns as we advanced; and after hovering around and near us for about two hours, occasionally skirmishing with us during that time, they concentrated their force and made another charge on our left flank, which was quickly repulsed; shortly after which they retired, we continuing our march; and in the afternoon encamped on the bank of the San Fernando, three miles below this city, which we entered the following morning without molestation.

Our loss in the actions of the 8th and 9th instant was small, being one private killed and two officers (Lieutenant Renshaw of the navy and Captain Gillespie of the volunteers) and eleven privates wounded. The enemy mounted on fine horses and being the best riders in the world, carried off their killed and wounded, and we know not the number of them, though it must have been considerable.

== Aftermath ==
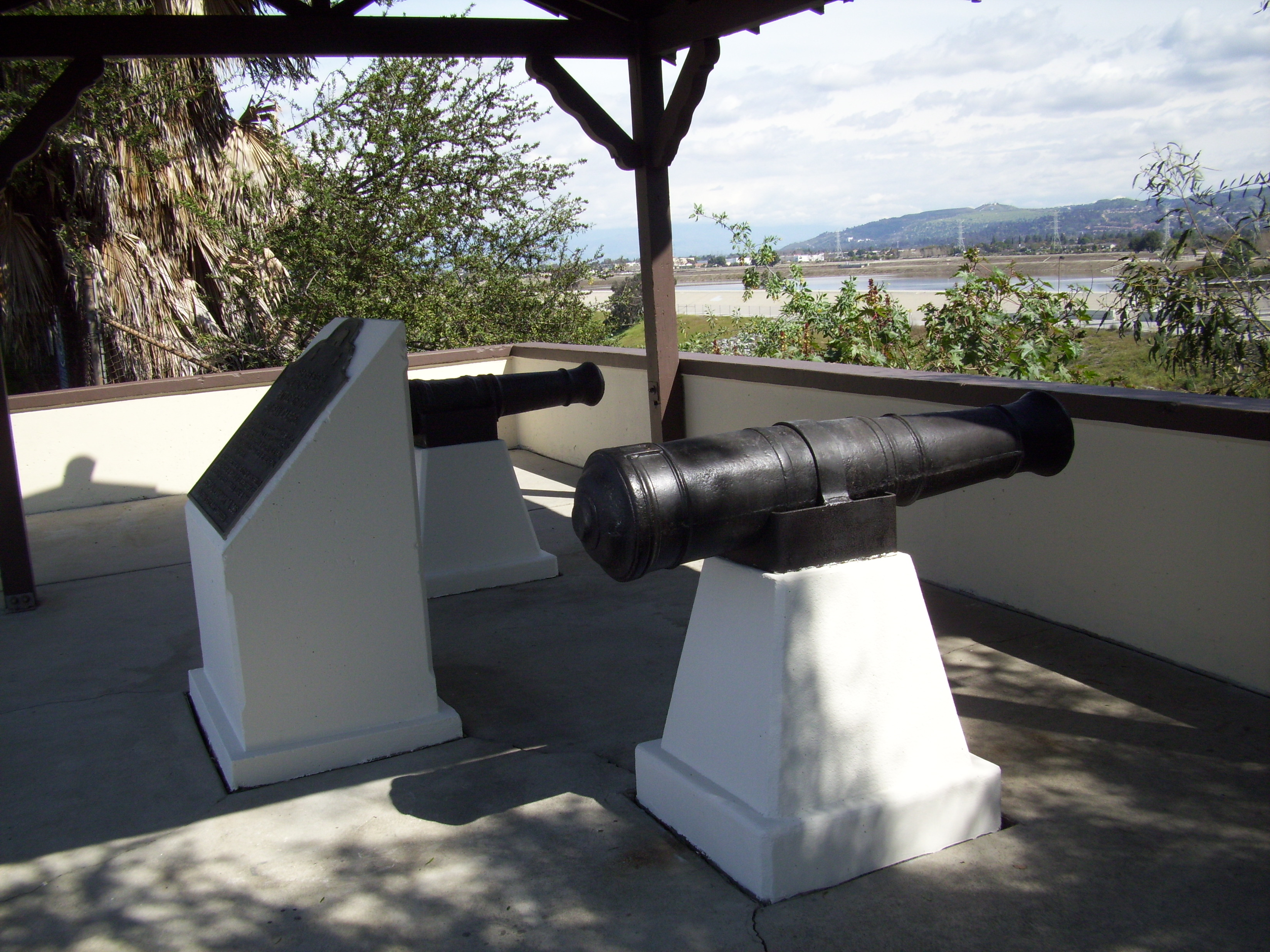
Río San Gabriel battlefield memorial in Montebello

Stockton and Kearny stayed on the field overnight and resumed the pursuit the next day, moving west from the San Gabriel River to the Los Angeles Rivers near present-day Vernon, about 4 miles south of Los Angeles. There they defeated Flores' troops at the Battle of La Mesa. On January 10 the U.S. forces reoccupied Los Angeles, and Archibald Gillespie was able to raise the same U.S. flag over the house which he was forced to bring down a year before during the Siege of Los Angeles.

After Los Angeles and the whole of southern California was secured, the command issue between Stockton and Kearny heated up once again. Stockton, who had been the initial military governor of California, later granted that post to his aide, Lieutenant-Colonel (later General) John C. Fremont. Kearny, based on his more recent orders from the War Department, asserted that post for himself but was initially ignored.

On January 10, 1847, Stockton established his headquarters on Wine Street, now known as Olvera Street, in the pueblo settlement of Ciudad de Los Angeles and assisted in setting up a civil government; that home is still standing as part of the historic area.

Kearny left California on 31 May 1847 for St. Louis, with Fremont, whom he would prefer charges. Stockton left on 20 June.

The site of the battle is now registered as California Historical Landmark #385. The memorial, marked by a plaque flanked by two cannons, is located at the corner of Washington Blvd. and Bluff Rd. in Montebello. Volunteers in costume re-enact the battle annually.

== California Historical Landmark Marker ==
California Historical Landmark Marker No. 385 at the site reads:

NO. 385 RIO SAN GABRIEL BATTLEFIELD - Near this site on January 8, 1847, American forces commanded by Captain Robert F. Stockton, U.S. Navy, Commander in Chief, and Brigadier General Stephen W. Kearny, U.S. Army, fought Californians commanded by General José María Flores in the Battle of the Río San Gabriel.

== See also ==
- List of conflicts in the United States
- Battles of the Mexican–American War
- Captain John Strother Griffin (1816–1898), physician during the battle
