= Conquest of California =

1846–1847 U.S. invasion of Alta California during the Mexican–American War

- Part of the Mexican–American War
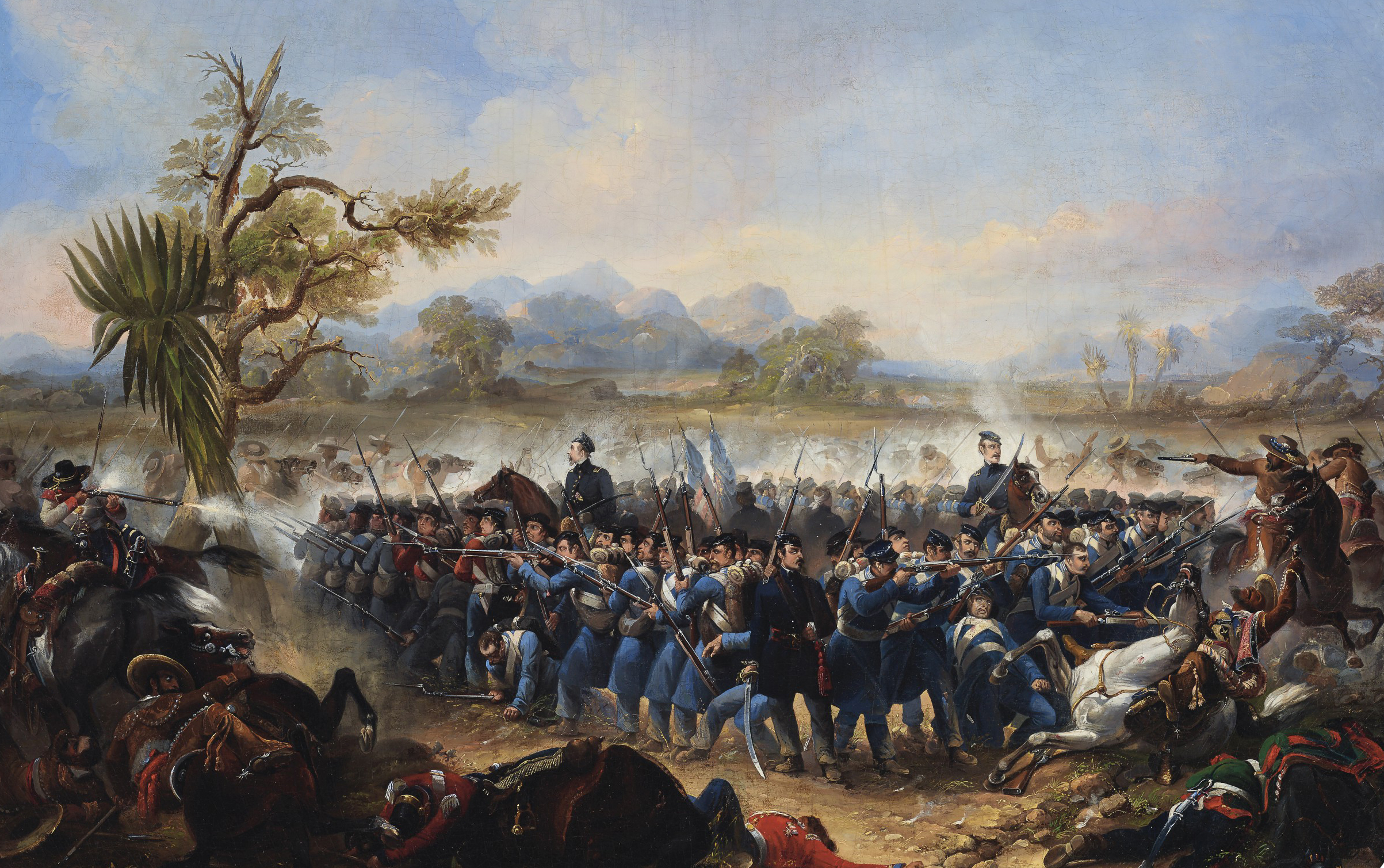
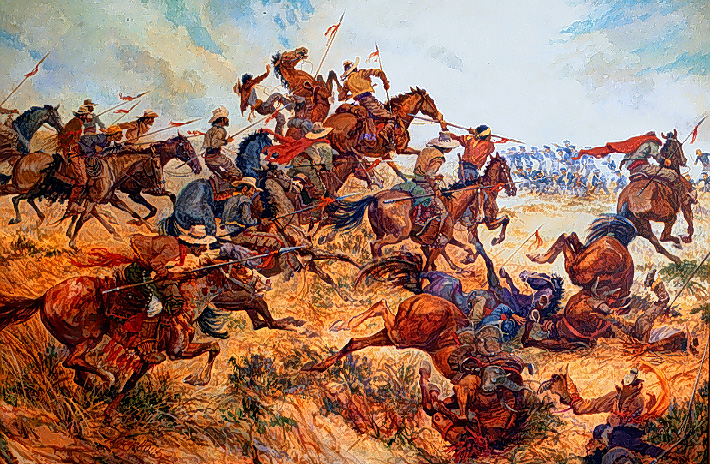
- Top: Battle of Río San Gabriel; Bottom: Battle of San Pasqual
| Date | 15 June 1846 – 13 January 1847 (6 months, 4 weeks and 2 days) |
| Location | Northern Theatre: Bay Area, Monterey Bay, Salinas Valley; Southern Theatre: San Diego Bay, Los Angeles Basin, Pomona Valley, Santa Barbara, San Pasqual Valley |
| Result | American victory Treaty of Cahuenga Full results: American military government installed in Alta California; Californio loss of power and influence; Beginning of the California genocide; Major American migration to the West; Displacement of Mexican Calfornios and Native Americans; Constitution of California, 1849; Eventual Californian statehood |
| Territorial changes | Mexican Cession (1848) |

Belligerents
| United States; California Republic (until July 9, 1846) | Mexico |

Commanders and leaders
| (United States) John Frémont; (United States) Robert Stockton; (United States) Stephen Kearny; (United States) John Sloat; (United States) John Montgomery; (United States) Archibald Gillespie (surrendered); (United States) William Mervine; (United States) James Reed; (United States) Earl Van Dorn; (United States) Ben Wilson (surrendered); (California Republic) William Ide | (Mexico) José Castro; (Mexico) José Flores; (Mexico) Andrés Pico (surrendered); (Mexico) Mariano Vallejo (surrendered); (Mexico) Pío Pico; (Mexico) Joaquín Torre; (Mexico) José de Noé; (Mexico) José del Lugo; (Mexico) José Carrillo; (Mexico) Francisco Sánchez |

Units involved
| Units: California Republic Bear Flag Rebels; United States California Battalion Army of the West Naval units Pacific Squadron Occupation units Mormon Battalion 1st Regiment of New York Volunteers | Units: Mexico Castro Battalion P. Pico Battalion Flores Battalion Local Town Militias Cavalry units A. Pico Lanceros Lugo Lanceros Carrillo Lanceros |

Strength
| (United States) USA; Initial strength: 30–300 militia; Horses and Mules; Native American Scouts; Peak strength: 2,000+ personnel (1847) | Mexico; Initial strength: 260–500 militiamen; 1 swivel Canon; Horses and Mules; Peak strength: 500 personnel (Jan. 1847) |

Casualties and losses
| California Republic: 1–2 killed; 3–7 wounded; 2 captured or missing; United States: ~35–40 killed; ~53–64 wounded; 25 captured or missing | Total: 64–75; 10–15 killed 50–55 wounded 4–5 captured |

The Conquest of California, also known as the Conquest of Alta California or the California Campaign, was a military campaign during the Mexican–American War carried out by the United States in Alta California (modern-day California), then part of Mexico, lasting from 1846 to 1847, and ending with signing of the Treaty of Cahuenga by military leaders from both the Californios and Americans.

== Background ==
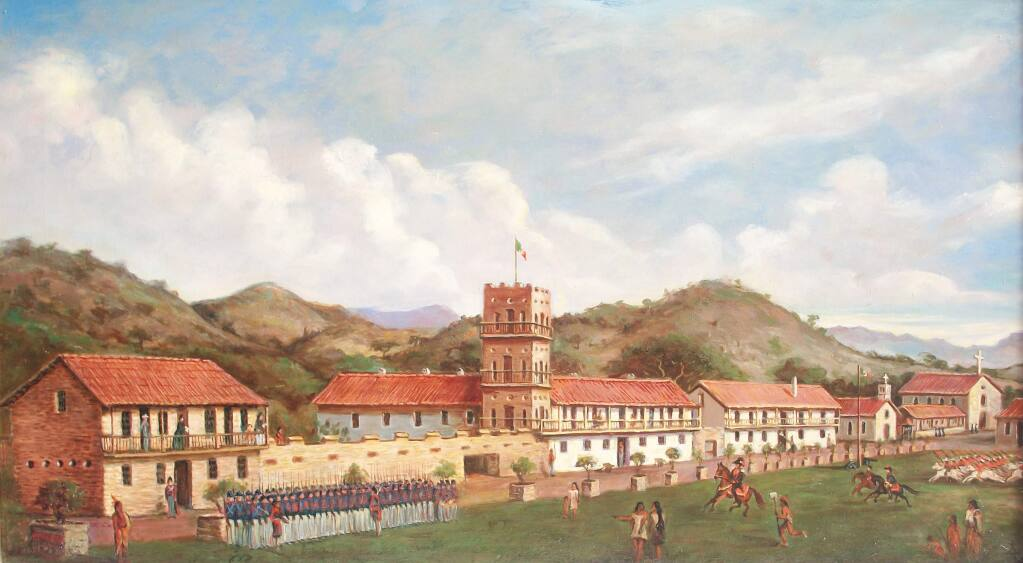
General Mariano Guadalupe Vallejo reviewing his troops in Sonoma, 1846

When war was declared on May 13, 1846, between the United States and Mexico, it took almost three months for definitive word of Congress' declaration of war to reach the Pacific coast. U.S. consul Thomas O. Larkin, stationed in the pueblo of Monterey, was concerned about the increasing possibility of war and worked to prevent bloodshed between the Americans and the small Mexican military garrison at the Presidio of Monterey, commanded by José Castro.

United States Army Captain John C. Frémont, on a U.S. Army Corps of Topographical Engineers expedition with about 60 well-armed men, crossed the Sierra Nevada range in December 1845. They reached the Oregon Territory by May 1846, when Frémont received word that war was imminent.

=== Bear Flag Revolt ===
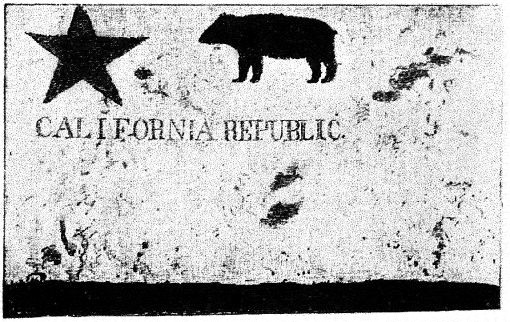
The Bear Flag of California, first raised during the Bear Flag Revolt

On June 14, 1846, the Bear Flag Revolt occurred when some 30 rebels, mostly American pioneers, staged a revolt in response to government threats of expulsion and seized the small Mexican Sonoma Barracks garrison, in the pueblo of Sonoma north of San Francisco Bay. There they formed the California Republic, created the "Bear Flag", and raised it over Sonoma. Eleven days later, troops led by Frémont, who had acted on his own authority, arrived from Sutter's Fort to support the rebels. No government was ever organized, but the Bear Flag Revolt has become part of the state's folklore. The present-day California state flag is based on this original Bear Flag, and continues to display the words "California Republic".

== Northern California ==
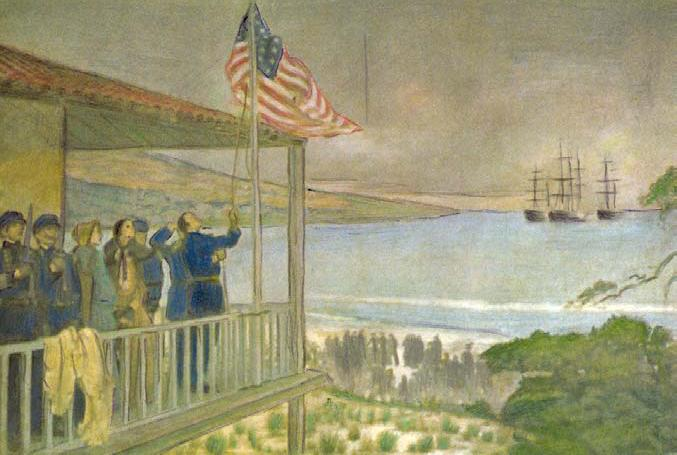
Forces raising the U.S. flag over the Monterey Customhouse following their victory at the Battle of Monterey

Before the Mexican–American War, preparations for a possible conflict with Mexico spurred the U.S. Pacific Squadron to be extensively reinforced to the point where it had roughly half of the ships in the United States Navy. As it took 120-200 days to sail from Atlantic ports on the east coast, around Cape Horn, to the Pacific ports in the Sandwich Islands and thence the mainland west coast, naval deployments had to be made well in advance of any possible conflict to be effective. Initially, with no United States ports in the Pacific, the squadron's ships operated out of storeships that provided naval supplies, purchased food, and obtained water from local ports of call in the Sandwich Islands and on the Pacific coast. Their orders were, upon determining "beyond a doubt" that war had been declared, to capture the ports and cities of Alta California.

Commodore John Drake Sloat, commander of the Pacific Squadron, on being informed of an outbreak of hostilities between Mexico and the United States, as well as the Bear Flag Revolt in Sonoma, ordered his naval forces to occupy ports in northern Alta California. Sloat's ships already in the Monterey harbor, the USS Savannah, USS Cyane, and USS Levant, captured the Alta Californian capital city in the Battle of Monterey on July 7, 1846, without firing a shot. Two days later on July 9, USS Portsmouth, which had been berthed at Sausalito, captured Yerba Buena (present-day San Francisco) in the Battle of Yerba Buena, again without firing a shot. On July 29, Sloat transferred his command to Commodore Robert F. Stockton, a more aggressive leader. The 400 to 650 marines and bluejackets (sailors) of Stockton's Pacific Squadron were the largest U.S. ground force in California. The rest of Stockton's troops were needed to man his vessels.

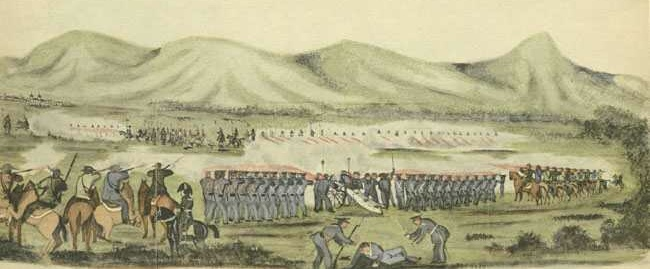
The 1847 Battle of Santa Clara, the only major engagement to take place in the Bay Area

To supplement this remaining force, Commodore Stockton ordered Captain John C. Frémont, on the U.S. Army Corps of Topographical Engineers survey, to secure 100 volunteers in addition to the California Battalion he had organized earlier. He received 160, exceeding his order. The volunteers were to act primarily as occupation forces to free up Stockton's marines and sailors. The core of the California Battalion was the approximately 30 army personnel and 30 scouts, guards, ex-fur trappers, Indians, geographers, topographers and cartographers in Frémont's exploration force, which was joined by about 150 Bear Flaggers. The American marines, sailors, and militia easily took over the cities and ports of northern California; within days they controlled Monterey, San Francisco, Sonoma, Sutter's Fort, New Helvetia, and other small pueblos in northern Alta California. Nearly all were occupied without a shot being fired. Some of the southern pueblos and ports were also rapidly occupied, with almost no bloodshed.

== Southern California ==
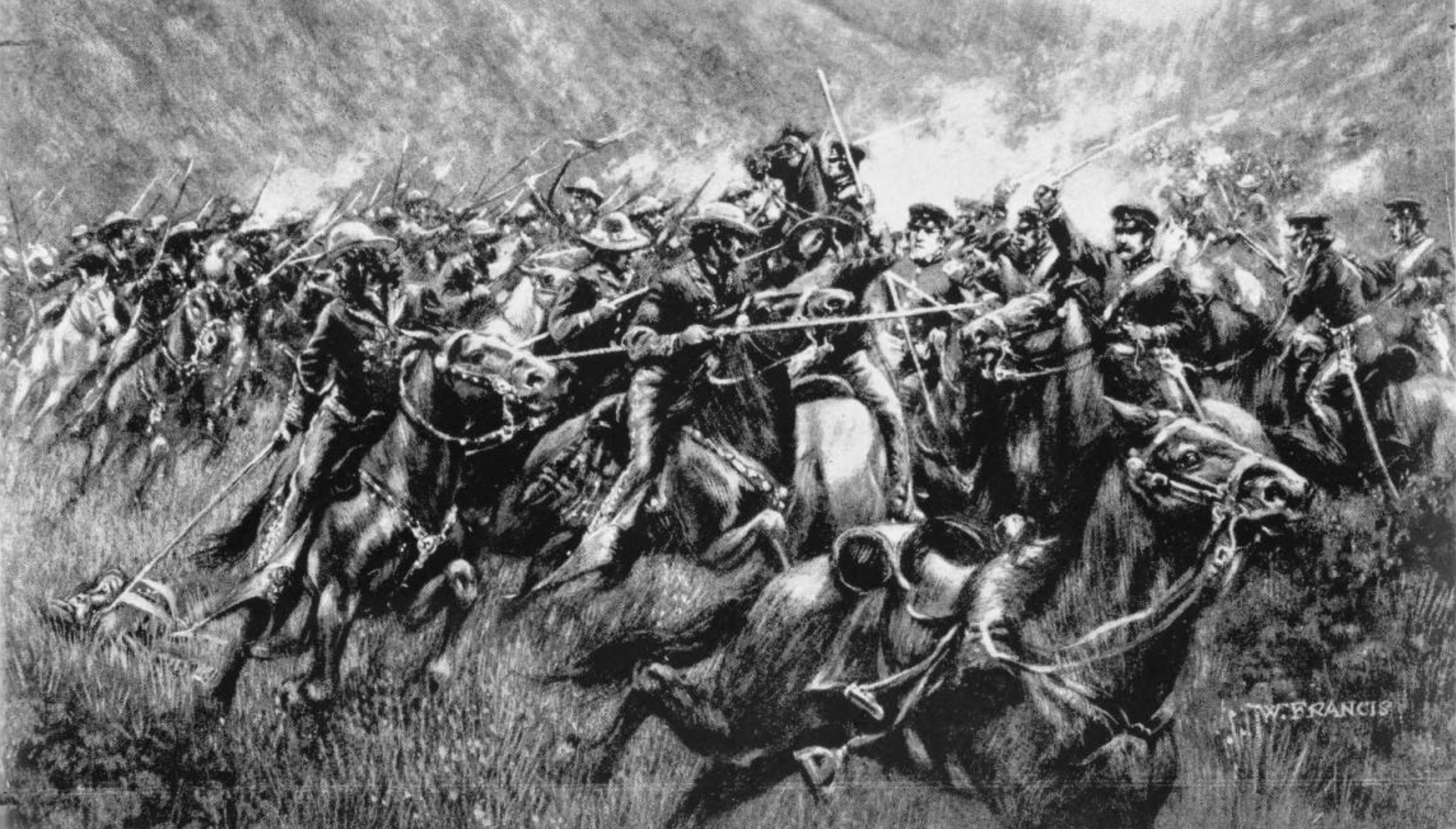
The Charge of the Caballeros depicts the Californio lancers at the Battle of San Pasqual

=== Californios and the war ===
Prior to the U.S. occupation, the population of Spanish and Mexican people in Alta California was approximately 1500 men and 6500 women and children, who were known as Californios. Many lived in or near the small Pueblo of Los Angeles (present-day Los Angeles). Many other Californios lived on the 455 ranchos of Alta California, which contained slightly more than 8,600,000 acres (35,000 km^{2}), nearly all bestowed by the Spanish and then Mexican governors with an average of about 18,900 acres (76 km^{2}) each.

Most of the approximately 800 American and other immigrants were adult males, and lived in northern California. They approved of breaking from the Mexican government, and gave only token or no resistance to the forces of Stockton and Frémont.

=== Siege of Los Angeles ===
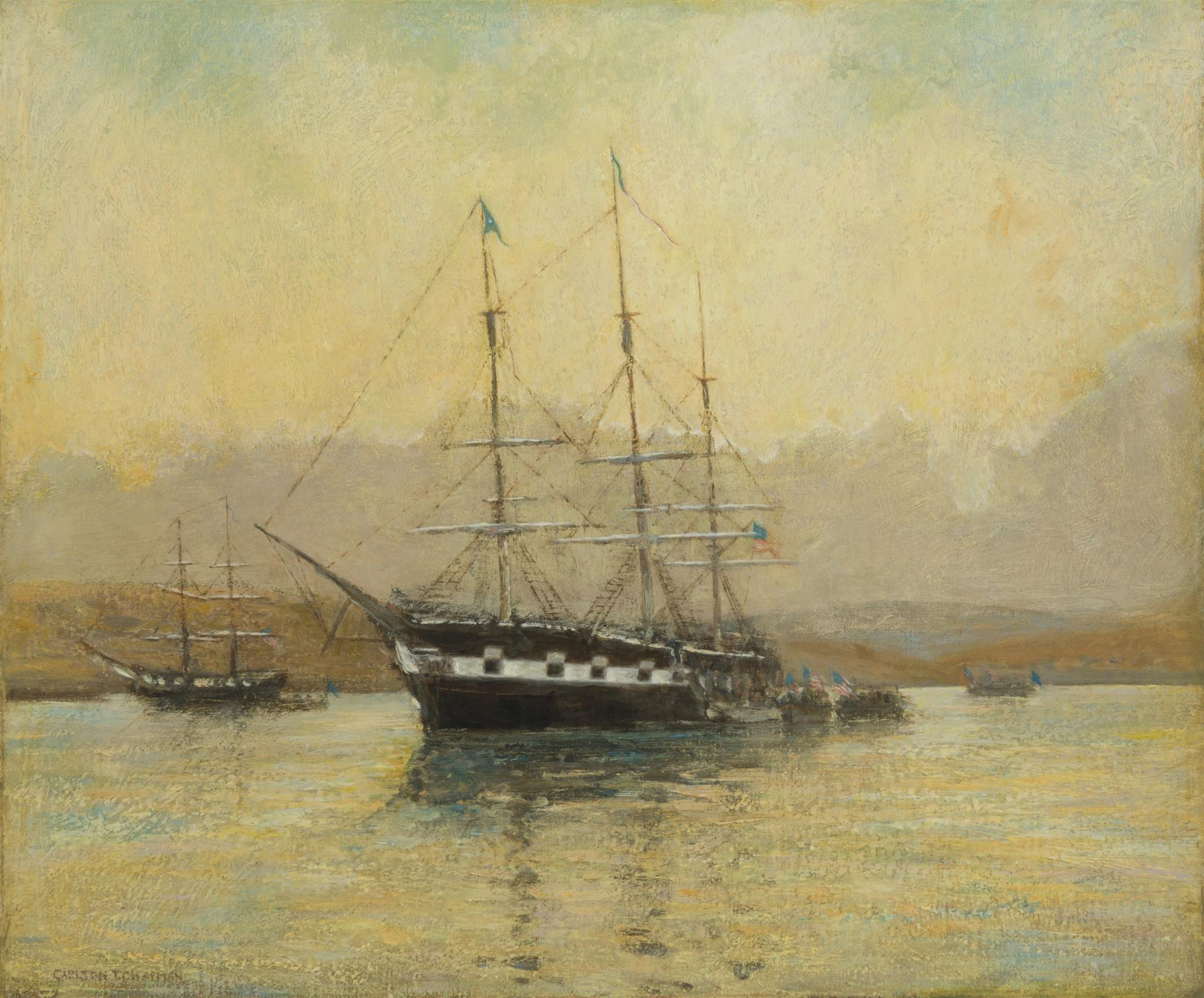
The capture of San Diego by the USS Cyane in 1846

In Southern California, Mexican General José Castro and Alta California Governor Pío Pico fled the Pueblo of Los Angeles before the arrival of American forces. On August 13, 1846, when Stockton's forces entered Los Angeles with no resistance, the nearly bloodless conquest of California seemed complete. The force of 36 that Stockton left in Los Angeles was too small, and enforced a tyrannical control over the people of the city. On September 29, in the Siege of Los Angeles, the independent Californios, led by José María Flores, forced the small American garrison to retire to the harbor. Soon afterward, 200 reinforcements sent by Stockton and led by U.S. Navy Captain William Mervine were repulsed on October 8 in the one-hour Battle of Dominguez Rancho on Rancho San Pedro, with four Americans killed.

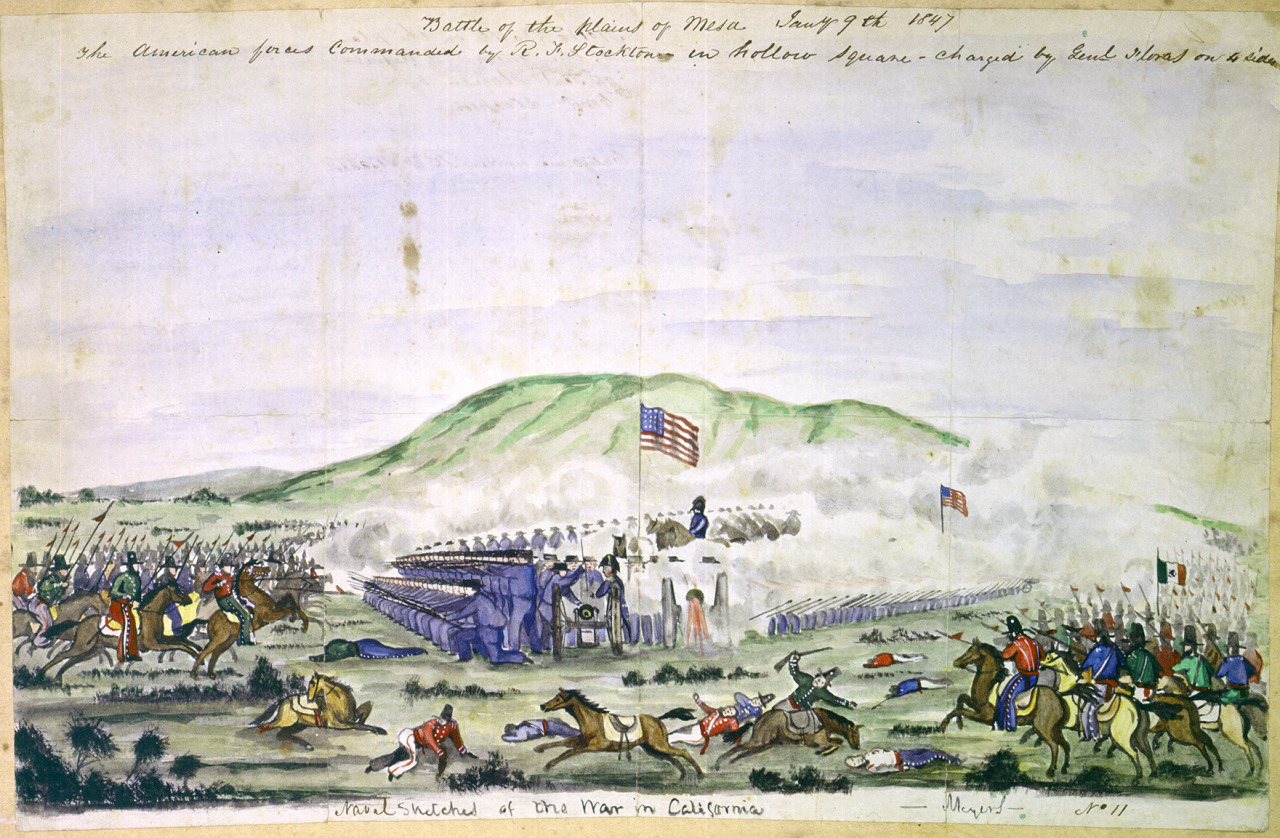
The Battle of La Mesa was the last major battle of the conquest

In late November, General Stephen W. Kearny, with a squadron of 100 dragoons, finally reached the Colorado River at the present-day California border after a grueling march across the province of Santa Fe de Nuevo México and the Sonoran Desert. Then, on December 6, they fought in the botched half-hour Battle of San Pasqual east of San Diego pueblo. 21 of Kearny's troops were killed in the botched engagement, the largest number of American casualties in the battles of the California Campaign.

Stockton rescued Kearny's surrounded forces and, with their combined force totaling 660 troops, they moved northward from San Diego, entering the Los Angeles Basin on January 8, 1847. On that day they fought the Californios in the Battle of Rio San Gabriel and the next day in the Battle of La Mesa. The last significant body of Californios surrendered to American forces on January 12, marking the end of hostilities in Alta California.

== Aftermath ==
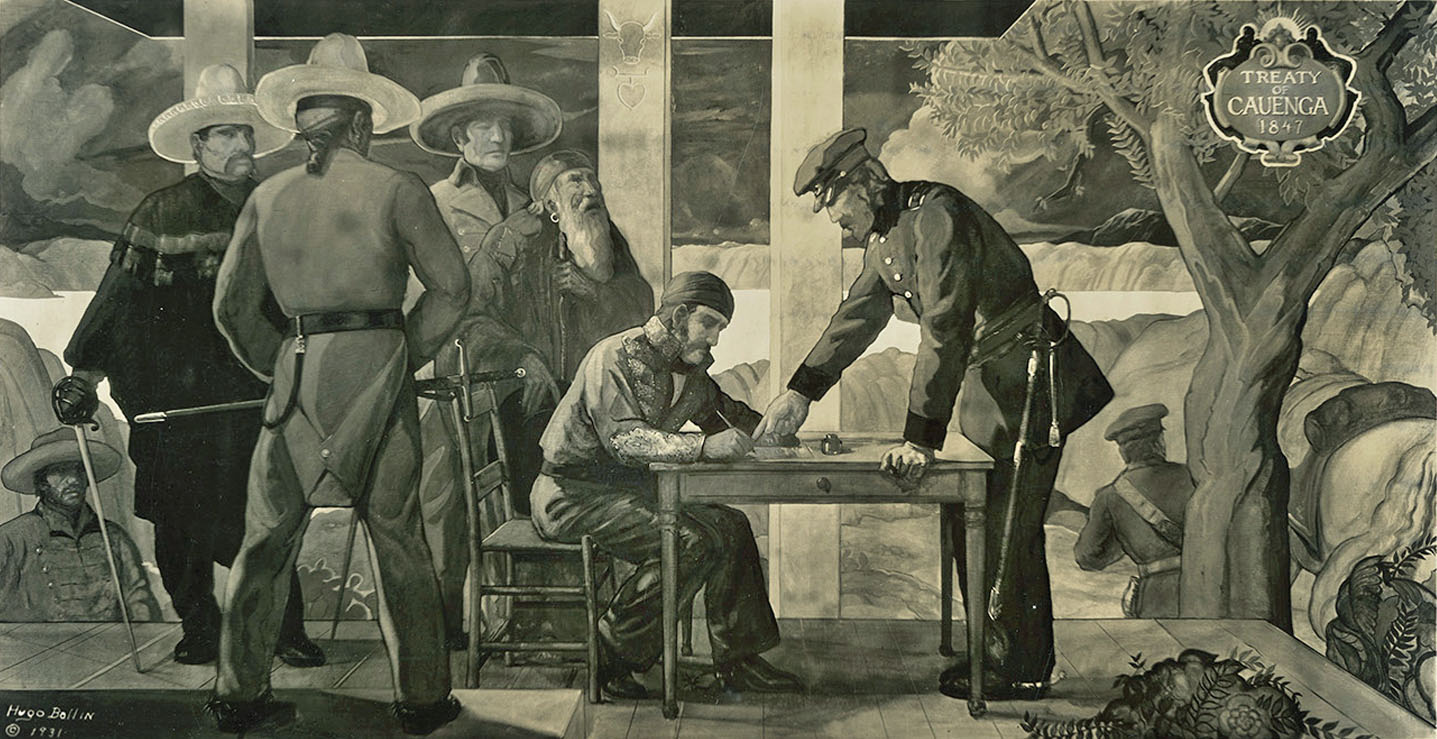
Signing of the Treaty of Cahuenga by Californio Andrés Pico and American John C. Frémont

=== Treaty of Cahuenga ===
The Treaty of Cahuenga was signed on January 13, 1847, and terminated hostilities in Alta California. The treaty was drafted in English and Spanish by José Antonio Carrillo and approved by American Brigadier General John C. Frémont and Californio General Andrés Pico at Campo de Cahuenga in the Cahuenga Pass of Los Angeles. It was later ratified by Frémont's superiors, Commodore Robert F. Stockton and General Stephen Kearny (brevet rank).

=== Pacific Coast Campaign ===
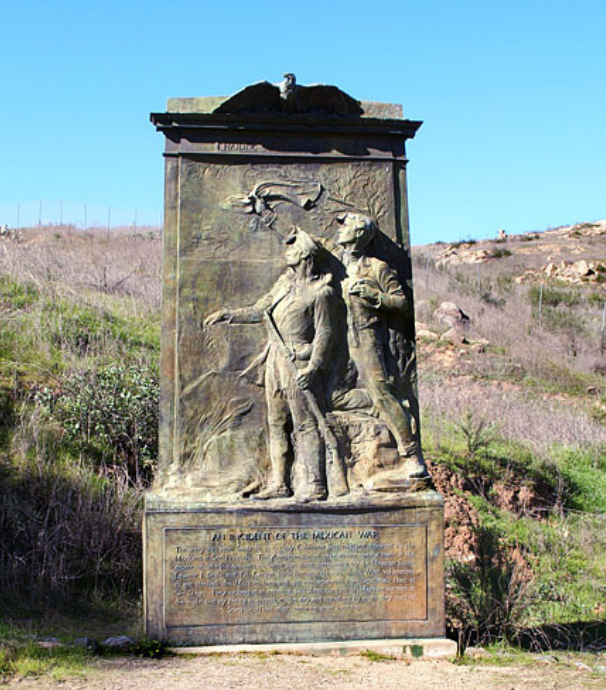
The San Pasqual Battlefield Monument, sculpted in 1910 by Isidore Konti.

In July 1846, Colonel Jonathan D. Stevenson of New York was asked to raise a volunteer regiment of ten companies of 77 men each to go to California with the understanding that they would muster out and stay in California. They were designated the 1st Regiment of New York Volunteers and took part in the Pacific Coast Campaign. In August and September 1846 the regiment trained and prepared for the trip to California.

Three private merchant ships, Thomas H Perkins, Loo Choo, and Susan Drew, were chartered, and the sloop USS Preble was assigned convoy detail. On September 26, the four ships sailed for California. Fifty men who had been left behind for various reasons sailed on November 13, 1846, on the small storeship USS Brutus. The Susan Drew and Loo Choo reached Valparaíso, Chile by January 20, 1847, and they were on their way again by January 23. The Perkins did not stop until San Francisco, reaching port on March 6, 1847. The Susan Drew arrived on March 20 and the Loo Choo arrived on March 26, 1847, 183 days after leaving New York. The Brutus finally arrived on April 17.

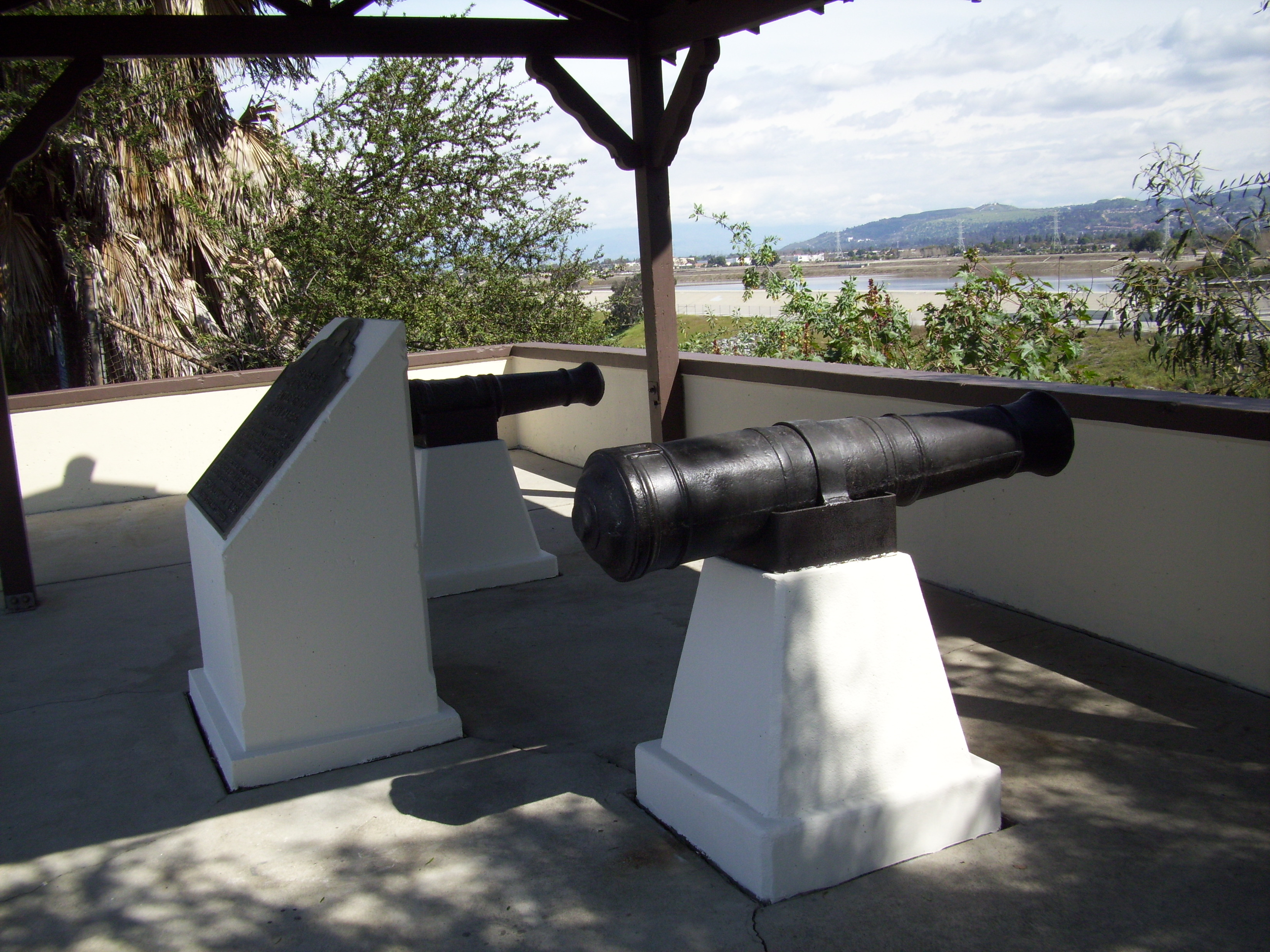
Battle of Río San Gabriel cannons and memorial in Montebello, California

After desertions and deaths in transit, the four ships brought 648 men to California. The companies were then deployed throughout Upper Alta California and Lower Baja California on the Baja California Peninsula (captured by the Navy and later returned to Mexico), from San Francisco to La Paz. The ship Isabella sailed from Philadelphia on August 16, 1846, with a detachment of one hundred soldiers, and arrived in California on February 18, 1847, at about the same time that the ship Sweden arrived with another detachment of soldiers. These soldiers were added to the existing companies of Stevenson's 1st New York Volunteer Regiment. These troops assumed nearly all onshore military and garrison of both the Pacific Squadron and the California Battalion.

In January 1847, Lieutenant William Tecumseh Sherman and about 100 regular U.S. Army soldiers arrived in Monterey. American forces in the pipeline continued to dribble into California.

Mormon Battalion

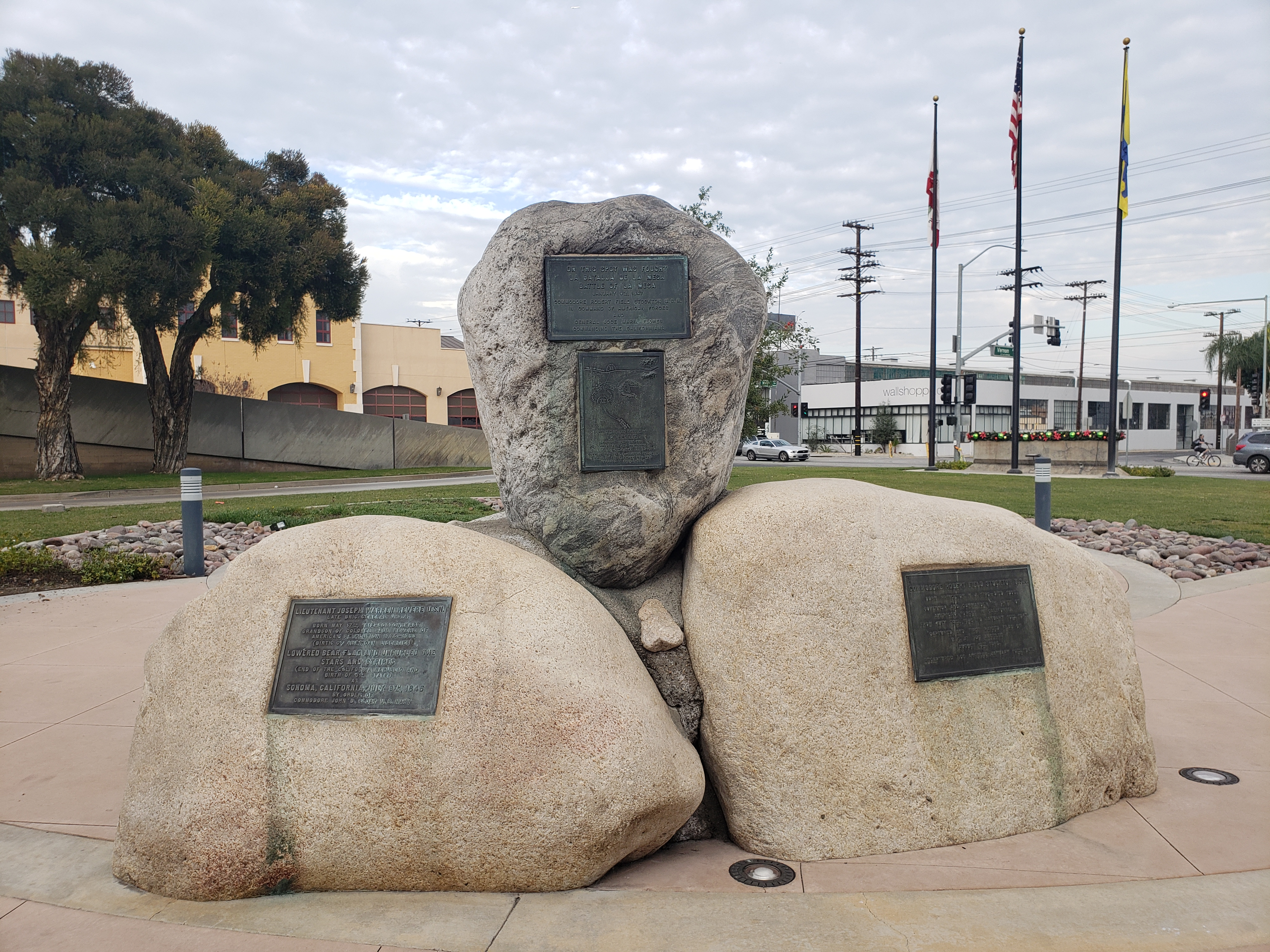
California Historical Landmark commemorating the Battle of La Mesa

The Mormon Battalion served from July 1846 to July 1847 during the Mexican–American War. It was a volunteer unit of 534 to 559 men from The Church of Jesus Christ of Latter-day Saints, who were led by Mormon company officers and commanded by regular United States Army senior officers. The battalion embarked on a grueling march of approximately 1,900 miles from Council Bluffs, Iowa to San Diego, making it one of the longest single military marches in U.S. history.

The Mormon Battalion arrived in San Diego on January 29, 1847. Over the next five months, until their discharge on July 16, 1847, in Los Angeles, they trained and performed garrison duties at several locations in southern California. After their discharge, some of the former members helped build a sawmill for John Sutter, where gold was discovered in January 1848, sparking the California Gold Rush.

=== Treaty of Guadalupe Hidalgo ===
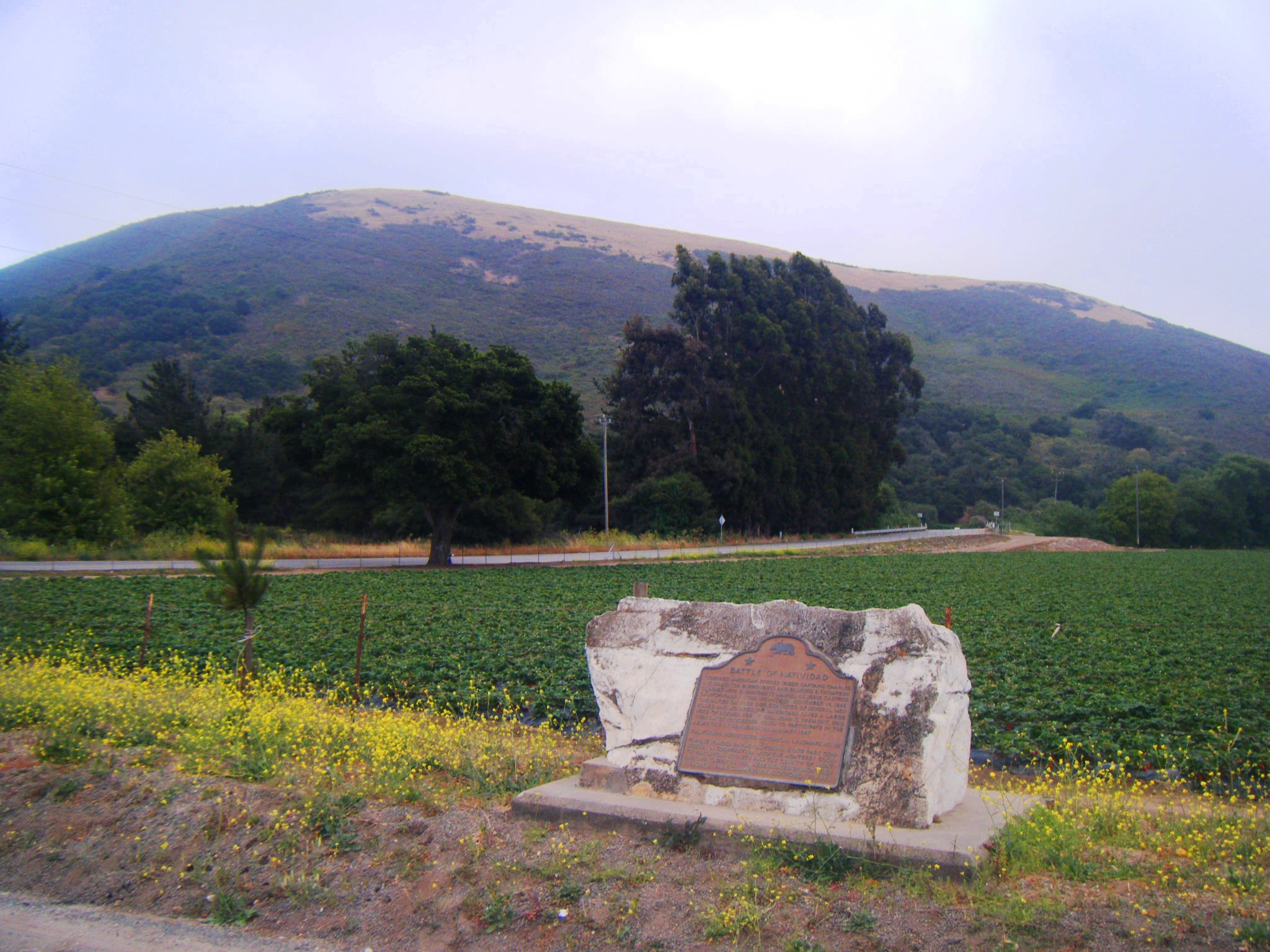
The Battle of Natividad historical landmark in the Salinas Valley

The Treaty of Guadalupe Hidalgo, signed in February 1848, marked the end of the Mexican–American War. By the terms of the treaty, Mexico formally ceded Alta California along with its other northern territories east through Texas, receiving US$15,000,000 (equivalent to $558,173,077 in 2025) in exchange. This largely unsettled territory constituted nearly half of its claimed territory with about 1% of its then population of about 4,500,000.

=== California Genocide ===
The conquest and California officially becoming part of the United States set off a genocide against the indigenous peoples of California. The United States federal government and the newly created state government of California incited, aided, and financed the violence against the Native Americans, including massacres, cultural genocide, and forced enslavement. On January 6, 1851, at his State of the State address to the California Senate, the first Governor Peter Burnett said: "That a war of extermination will continue to be waged between the races until the Indian race becomes extinct must be expected. While we cannot anticipate this result but with painful regret, the inevitable destiny of the race is beyond the power or wisdom of man to avert." Between 1846 and 1873, it is estimated that non-Natives killed between 9,492 and 16,094 California Natives. Hundreds to thousands were additionally starved or worked to death. Acts of enslavement, kidnapping, rape, child separation and displacement were widespread. These acts were encouraged, tolerated, and carried out by state authorities and militias.

== Timeline of events ==
California Campaign
Captured settlements
American Victory
Mexican Victory

| Date | Events surrounding the United States' conquest of California |
| May 1841 | General Juan Almonte, Mexican minister of war, wrote to Mariano Guadalupe Vallejo, comandante general of California, concerning the reported emigration of 58 families from Missouri and gave strict orders that every foreigner should be compelled to show a passport or leave the country. In the dispatch, Almonte enclosed a clipping from the National Intelligencer regarding "the convenience and necessity of the acquisition of the Californias by the United States". Almonte further warned Vallejo to put little trust in the alleged claim by the Americans that they were coming with peaceful intentions. Despite this command from Mexico City, the Californians showed little desire to molest the settlers from the United States. |
| Jul 1841 | American Peter Lassen was arrested at Bodega Bay, California, for illegally entering California. |
| Summer 1841 | John C. Frémont was part of a U.S. Army topographical expedition to survey Iowa Territory. |
| Sep 1841 | The United States Exploring Expedition, on its world voyage under the command of Lieutenant Charles Wilkes, reached San Francisco Bay, with instructions from the U.S. government to survey the harbor. |
| 19 Oct 1841 | Frémont and Jessie Benton, daughter of U.S. Senator Thomas Benton of Missouri, were married. |
| 04 Nov 1841 | Bartleson–Bidwell Party, led by Captain John Bartleson and John Bidwell, arrived at John Marsh's ranch, becoming the first American emigrants to attempt a wagon crossing from Missouri to California. |
| 04 Dec 1841 | United States Secretary of the Navy, Abel P. Upshur, announced in his annual report to Congress that the protection of American interests in California demanded an increase of the government's naval force in the Pacific. Shortly afterward, he despatched Commodore Thomas ap Catesby Jones to take command of the enlarged Pacific Squadron. |
| Summer 1842 | Frémont led an expedition to survey the Oregon Trail in what is now Wyoming. |
| 19 Oct 1842 | The commander of the Pacific Squadron, Thomas ap Catesby Jones, seized Monterey. After hearing false news that war had broken out between the United States and Mexico, ap Catesby Jones had sailed from Lima, Peru, to Monterey with three warships. The Americans' objective was to take control of the capital city before a suspected British occupation could be achieved. The Americans left the next day, Mexican troops were freed, and the landing party boarded their ships and set sail, saluting the Mexican flag as it exited the harbor. |
| 30 Dec 1842 | After the capture of Monterey, Governor Manuel Micheltorena was sent by President Santa Anna to replace California Governor Alvarado. Micheltorena brought with him from Mexico a group of soldiers that included criminals, who were derisively referred to by some as cholos, to enforce his policies. |
| 13 May 1843 | Frémont departed St. Louis on a survey expedition to the mouth of the Columbia River in Oregon Territory. |
| Nov 1843 | Frémont's expedition reached Fort Vancouver. |
| Jan 1844 | Frémont's expedition crossed the Sierras into present-day California. |
| Mar 1844 | Frémont reached Sutter's Fort, near present-day Sacramento. |
| 01 Jul 1844 | Nearing the end of the return trip, Frémont arrived at Bent's Fort, in what is now Colorado, after traveling through the San Joaquin Valley and the Mojave Desert. |
| 19 Feb 1845 | After another Californio uprising, the unpopular Micheltorena was defeated at the Battle of Providencia and left California. Californio Pío Pico took the role of California Governor three days after the battle. Pico was Mexican California's last governor before the invasion of American troops. |
| 04 Mar 1845 | James K. Polk was inaugurated as U.S. president. |
| 21 Mar 1845 | Navy Secretary George Bancroft sent a secret message to the port of Callou, Peru, ordering Commodore John D. Sloat, commander of the Navy's Pacific Squadron, to proceed to Mazatlán on the Mexican west coast. |
| 12 May 1845 | U.S. Navy flotilla commanded by Commodore Robert F. Stockton, on the warship Princeton, visited Galveston to gauge local attitudes for Texas annexation. |
| Jun 1845 | Frémont's next Army survey expedition, approved earlier in the year by President Polk, left St. Louis on a mission to explore the Great Basin and Alta California. |
| Jun 1845 | Commander John Sloat received Bancroft's orders to proceed from the Peruvian coast to Mexican waters. |
| mid-Jun 1845 | War Secretary William Marcy sent orders to Brigadier General Zachary Taylor to move his 2,000-man force from Ft. Jessup, Louisiana, to Corpus Christi, Texas. By October, Taylor commanded 3,500 men. |
| 04 Jul 1845 | Meeting in convention, leaders of the Republic of Texas approved an annexation treaty with the U.S. |
| 16 Aug 1845 | John C. Frémont, leading a U.S. Army topographical expedition to survey the Great Basin in Alta California, departed from Bent's Fort in what is now Colorado. |
| Oct 1845 | Frémont's expedition reached the Salt Lake. |
| 17 Oct 1845 | Secretary of State James Buchanan dispatched a secret message to U.S. Consul Thomas Larkin in Monterey instructing him to take advantage of any sign of unrest among the Californians. |
| 30 Oct 1845 | President James K. Polk met with Lt. Archibald Gillespie to send him on a secret mission to California. He departed for Vera Cruz, Mexico, on November 16 carrying orders for Sloat, instructions for Larkin and letters for Frémont. |
| Nov 1845 | General José Castro, the senior military officer in California, issued a decree ordering all American immigrants in Alta California (about 800) to proceed to Sonoma to swear an oath to Mexico and get a license to settle. Twenty Americans later showed up at Sonoma. |
| Nov 1845 | Commodore John D. Sloat, commander of the Navy's Pacific Squadron, then off Mazatlán, Mexico, was joined by the Cyane, which carried orders that if Sloat learned "beyond a doubt" that war between the U.S. and Mexico had begun, he was to seize San Francisco Bay and blockade the other California ports. |
| 11 Nov 1845 | General Castro visited Colonel Mariano Vallejo, commandante of the Mexican garrison in Sonoma. |
| 16 Nov 1845 | Lt. Archibald Gillespie departed Washington for Vera Cruz, Mexico. |
| 27 Nov 1845 | The two parts of Frémont's split party had a rendezvous at Walker Lake, northeast of Yosemite Valley. |
| Dec 1845 | The Frémont expedition entered the Sacramento Valley. |
| 10 Dec 1845 | Splitting up once more, Frémont and 16 others (including scout Kit Carson) reached Sutter's Fort. |
| 29 Dec 1845 | President Polk signed legislation admitting Texas to the Union. Mexico refused to recognize the U.S. annexation. |
| Jan 1846 | John Slidell, appointed by Polk, arrived in Vera Cruz on a mission to negotiate a boundary agreement, and, if Mexico demonstrated a willingness to sell its departments of New Mexico and California, to offer up to $40 million for them. |
| Jan 1846 | Frémont and his smaller group crossed the San Joaquin Valley to Monterey. |
| 27 Jan 1846 | Frémont visited Thomas Larkin, the U.S. consul in Monterey. Frémont also met Jose Castro, who agreed to let Frémont winter in the San Joaquin Valley, away from the coast. |
| mid-Feb 1846 | Frémont met up with the other 45 men in his party and traveled north to the vicinity of the San Jose Mission. |
| 05 Mar 1846 | After moving his camp to Santa Cruz, Frémont moved it again closer to Monterey on the Salinas River. Via courier, General Castro ordered Frémont to leave. Frémont then set up camp at Gavilan Peak, near San Juan Bautista. |
| 06 Mar 1846 | Mexican president José Herrera rejected all points of Slidell's proposed negotiation. |
| 08 Mar 1846 | General Castro assembled a cavalry force of nearly 200 men to confront Frémont near San Luis Bautista. |
| 08 Mar 1846 | Zachary Taylor moved his army across the Nueces River in Texas, which Mexico considered the southern border of its department of Texas. |
| 09 Mar 1846 | After receiving a message from Larkin not to oppose Castro, Frémont's band left Gavilan Peak and headed for Sutter's Fort. |
| mid-Mar 1846 | Larkin sent a message to Sloat at Mazatlán asking one of his ships to come to Monterey. Sloat sent the Portsmouth, John B. Montgomery commanding. Montgomery was tasked to distribute copies of the U.S. and Texas constitutions in Spanish. |
| 21 Mar 1846 | Frémont arrived at Sutter's Fort to ready a further expedition to the Oregon Territory. |
| 28 Mar 1846 | Zachary Taylor's force arrived at the Rio Grande near Matamoros. |
| 30 Mar 1846 | Frémont's party reached Rancho Bosquejo on Deer Creek, 200 miles (320 km) north of Sutter's Fort. His tentative plan was to map a route from the western slope of the Cascades across the Great Basin to link with the Oregon Trail. (Historians have suggested this was a calculated delaying tactic.) |
| late Mar 1846 | Alarmed by Frémont's transgression at Gavilan Peak, General Castro called a military council in Monterey. |
| 5 Apr 1846 | Fremont's party carried out the Sacramento River massacre of several hundred Indians near present-day Redding, California. |
| 17 Apr 1846 | In Monterey, Larkin met with Lt. Gillespie, who had finally arrived in Monterey via Honolulu on the Cyane. |
| 17 Apr 1846 | In Monterey, Mexico issued a proclamation that unnaturalized foreigners were no longer permitted to hold or work land in California and were subject to expulsion. |
| 21 Apr 1846 | The Portsmouth anchored in Monterey Bay. |
| 24 Apr 1846 | Mexican President Mariano Rivera y Arrillaga (who had deposed Herrera), having earlier sent a 5,000-man army northward to Texas, declared a "defensive war" against the United States. The Mexican army arrived in Matamoros on the Rio Grande on April 24. |
| 25 Apr 1846 | Troops under Zachary Taylor and Mexican General Mariano Arista skirmished north of the Rio Grande. 16 Americans were killed, after which Taylor communicated the events in a message sent to Washington. |
| 08 May 1846 | Frémont, then camped at Upper Klamath Lake in Oregon Territory, learned that a military man (Gillespie) was riding north to intercept him. |
| 08 May 1846 | At Palo Alto on the Rio Grande in Texas, an artillery battle lasted from 2:30 p.m. to nightfall. 5 Americans died, 43 were wounded, and over 30 Mexicans were killed. |
| 09 May 1846 | Frémont met with Gillespie and received letters from wife Jessie, Senator Benton and Secretary of State James Buchanan, as well as Gillespie's memorized messages from Polk, Benton and Larkin. |
| 09 May 1846 | At the Rio Grande, the U.S. and Mexican armies met at Reseca de la Palma. Arista's army was routed, leaving behind 400 wounded. 33 Americans died, 89 were wounded. |
| 09 May 1846 | President Polk received General Taylor's April 25 message. |
| 10 May 1846 | While asleep in the early morning hours, the Frémont camp was attacked by Klamath Indians, killing three of Frémont's party. The Klamath chief was shot dead during the fight. |
| 12 May 1846 | The Frémont party attacked a Klamath village, killing 14 Indians and burning the lodges (see Klamath Lake massacre). The expedition turned back toward California. |
| 13 May 1846 | The United States Congress voted overwhelmingly to declare war on Mexico. Definitive word of the declaration reached California in August. |
| 13 May 1846 | The war secretary sent orders to Colonel Stephen Kearny at Fort Leavenworth, in what is now Kansas, to march west to conquer and occupy the Mexican departments of New Mexico and California. |
| 18 May 1846 | General Taylor's army entered Mexico and occupied Matamoros. |
| 18 May 1846 | Commodore Sloat in Mazatlán received detailed news of the April 25 ambush of Captain Seth Thornton's command on the Rio Grande. Sloat sent the warning of hostilities to Monterey with Captain William Mervine aboard the Cyane, which set sail on May 19. |
| 24 May 1846 | On its way south, the Frémont expedition reached Peter Lassen's ranch and learned that the Portsmouth was anchored at Sausalito. Lt. Gillespie was sent to request supplies (8000 percussion caps, 300 pounds of rifle lead, one keg of powder and food provisions) from Montgomery and to continue on to Monterey to inform Larkin that the expedition would be heading back to St. Louis. |
| 31 May 1846 | Frémont's party, along with Gillespie and his escort, camped at the Buttes, 60 miles north of Sutter's Fort. While there, they killed several Indians near present-day Meridian, California (see Sutter Buttes massacre). |
| late May 1846 | With rumors swirling that General Castro was massing an army against them, American settlers in the Sacramento Valley banded together to meet the threat. |
| 31 May 1846 | Sloat received trustworthy news of Taylor's battles of May 8–9. His orders required him to sail north upon learning "without a doubt" that war had been declared. |
| early Jun 1846 | Believing that war with Mexico was a virtual certainty, Frémont joined the Sacramento Valley rebels in a "silent partnership". |
| early Jun 1846 | John Sutter, a Swiss who was a naturalized Mexican citizen, notified his immediate superior, General Castro, of Gillespie's true identity and urged Castro to send a respectable garrison north in the event of trouble. |
| 05 Jun 1846 | José Castro again visited Mariano Vallejo in Sonoma and collected horses and supplies for his men from Vallejo's ranch. |
| 07 Jun 1846 | Sloat received news that an American squadron had blockaded Vera Cruz. |
| 08 Jun 1846 | Among the settlers, William Knight visited William Ide to report the rumor that "armed Spaniards on horseback" had been seen in the valley. The two rode to Frémont's camp north of New Helvetia. Another report to Frémont said that Lt. Francisco Arce, militia officer Jose Maria Alviso, and eight armed men were near Sutter's Fort, driving a herd of 170 horses destined for Santa Clara. |
| 08 Jun 1846 | Sloat set sail for Monterey on the Savannah, leaving the Warren in Mazatlán to await receipt of the official declaration of war. |
| 10 June 1846 | The frigate Congress, flagship of Commodore Robert F. Stockton, arrived at Honolulu in the Sandwich Islands to land the U.S. Commissioner. Congress later departed for Monterey Bay to join the Pacific Squadron, trailing by a significant distance the sloop Levant, which had departed Mazatlán on May 20, taken on supplies in Hawaii, and also sailed for Monterey. |
| 10 Jun 1846 | Four men from Frémont's party and 10 volunteers rode out to intercept Arce, surprised him and seized the horse herd, thus initiating the open rebellion of the Osos. |
| 11 Jun 1846 | The Americans drove the herd north to the Buttes camp, gathering a dozen new volunteers. (Historian H. H. Bancroft later wrote that Frémont "instigated and planned" the horse raid, and incited the American settlers indirectly and "guardedly" to revolt.) |
| 13 Jun 1846 | 34 armed men (none was from Frémont's party) rode from the Buttes to seize the town of Sonoma, force the surrender of Colonel Vallejo, and thus forestall Castro's plan to harry the settlers and force them to leave Mexico. The Osos knew that Sonoma had had no garrison for a year and no finances for one. |
| 14 Jun 1846 | The Osos entered Sonoma at dawn, rode to Vallejo's Casa Grande and knocked on the door. Vallejo served the Oso leaders food and brandy during a three-hour period in which surrender documents were drafted, with provisions for the Americans to respect the townspeople and their property. Several Osos rejected the surrender. Ezekiel Merritt and John Grigsby asserted that Frémont had ordered the capture of Sonoma. William Ide beseeched his fellow insurgents to keep themselves under control. 24 Osos stood with him and elected him their leader. William Todd fashioned the Bear Flag, which was later raised in Sonoma Plaza. Ten men were selected to escort four prisoners taken from the Vallejo's homestead, including Mariano Vallejo, to the American camp, 80 miles away. |
| 14 Jun 1846 | Frémont and his band rode to Sutter's Fort, not yet aware of the raid's outcome, to receive the supplies that were requested from Montgomery. |
| 15 Jun 1846 | The Oregon Territory convention was signed by England and the U.S., ending its joint occupation with England and making most Oregonians below the 49th parallel American citizens. |
| 15 Jun 1846 | William Ide proclaimed his "Bear Flag Manifesto". Within a week, over 70 more American volunteers joined the Osos. |
| 15 Jun 1846 | Ide sent Todd to the Portsmouth to notify Montgomery of the events in Sonoma. Todd also requested gunpowder, which was denied. |
| 16 Jun 1846 | Prisoners and escorts arrived at Frémont's camp. Frémont denied responsibility for the raid. The escorts removed the prisoners to Sutter's Fort. Frémont began signing letters as "Military Commander of U.S. Forces in California". |
| 16 Jun 1846 | John Montgomery of the Portsmouth in Sausalito sent a small landing party to Sonoma. Ide, in his first act as commander-in-chief, reappointed Jose Berryessa alcalde to continue as local magistrate. |
| 16 Jun 1846 | Todd returned to Sonoma. He and a companion were then assigned to ride toward Bodega Bay to obtain arms and powder from American settlers. |
| 17 Jun 1846 | General Castro and Pío Pico, governor of Alta California, condemned the takeover. |
| 18 Jun 1846 | Thomas Cowie and George Fowler were sent to Rancho Sotoyome (near modern-day Healdsburg) to pick up a cache of gunpowder from Moses Carson, brother of Frémont's scout. |
| 19 Jun 1846 | The Cyane reached Monterey, 31 days after leaving Mazatlán. |
| 20 Jun 1846 | After Todd, his companion, Cowie, and Fowler all failed to return, a five-man group obtained powder and also learned from a captured Californian that Cowie and Fowler were tortured and murdered by a patrol of California "irregulars" near Santa Rosa, led by Juan Padilla, and that Todd and his companion had been taken prisoner. |
| 23 Jun 1846 | 50 to 60 men under Captain Joaquin de la Torre traveled to San Pablo and crossed the San Francisco Bay by boat to Point San Quentin. |
| 23 Jun 1846 | Led by Henry Ford, about 20 Osos rode toward Santa Rosa to search for the two captives and Padilla's men. |
| 24 Jun 1846 | The search party captured four Californians near San Antonio and also found a corral of horses at Olompali, near the mouth of the Petaluma River, which they assumed belonged to Padilla's group. When they approached the ranchhouse, they discovered about 50 uniformed Californio lancers, in addition to Padilla's group, under the command of Captain Joaquin de la Torre. Ford's men opened fire from a distance, killing one and wounding one. Todd and his partner escaped, while the Californios returned to San Rafael and the Osos went to Sonoma. The "Battle of Olompali" was the only fight of the Bear Flag Republic. |
| 25 Jun 1846 | After learning of Cowie, Fowler and Ford's patrol, Frémont and his men rode to Sonoma. |
| 26 Jun 1846 | Frémont, Ford and a detachment of Osos rode south to San Rafael, but were unable to locate de la Torre and his Californios. |
| 27 Jun 1846 | Two additional divisions of General Castro's troops with a total of about 100 men arrived at San Pablo. |
| 28 Jun 1846 | General Castro, on the other side of San Francisco Bay, sent a boat across to Point San Pablo with a message for de la Torre. Kit Carson, Granville Swift and Sam Neal rode to the beach to intercept the three unarmed men who came ashore. Two 20-year-old twin brothers and the father of Jose Berryessa were then murdered in cold blood. |
| 28 Jun 1846 | Frémont's men intercepted a messenger with a letter advising Castro that de la Torre was about to attack Sonoma. Frémont and his forces immediately went there, only to find the Osos prepared to fire upon them as they approached. |
| 29 Jun 1846 | Realizing he had been tricked, Frémont hurried back to San Rafael and Sausalito in pursuit of de la Torre and his men, who had escaped across the bay and joined Castro in a retreat to Santa Clara. |
| 30 Jun 1846 | The Levant arrived at Monterey after sailing from Mazatlán via Hawaii. |
| 01 Jul 1846 | Sloat, sailing from Mazatlán aboard the Savannah, arrived at Monterey. |
| 01 Jul 1846 | The merchant ship Moscow transported Frémont and several others from Sausalito to Castillo de San Joaquin, an abandoned fort south of the entrance to San Francisco Bay, where they plugged the touch-holes of ten rusty cannons. |
| 02 Jul 1846 | Several Osos occupied Yerba Buena without resistance. |
| 04 Jul 1846 | The Bear Flaggers, including Frémont and his men, celebrated Independence Day in Sonoma. |
| 04 Jul 1846 | Sloat met with Larkin in Monterey. |
| 05 Jul 1846 | Ide's rebels numbered nearly 300. Frémont, Ide and their officers met to discuss strategy. Frémont announced that a disciplined army was to be formed, which he volunteered to command, by combining his and the Osos' forces. In order to march south, engage Castro and any other Californians, the California Battalion, as it came to be called, combined Frémont's original exploring party and over 200 rebels, Sutter workers and local Indians. |
| 05 Jul 1846 | Sloat received a message from Montgomery reporting the events in Sonoma and Frémont's involvement. |
| 06 Jul 1846 | One of the four companies of the California Battalion remained in Sonoma, as the other three left with Frémont for the camp near Sutter's Fort, where they planned the campaign against Castro and the other Californios. |
| 06 Jul 1846 | Believing Frémont to be acting on orders from Washington, Sloat began to carry out his orders. |
| 07 Jul 1846 | A landing party demanded the surrender of Monterey. An artillery officer in charge refused. Sloat then landed 225 sailors and marines on the beach. Within minutes the American flag was hoisted, the American ships' cannons added a 21-gun salute, and Sloat read his proclamation of the annexation of Alta California to the United States. A messenger was sent to General Castro at San Juan Bautista requesting his surrender. No shots had been fired. |
| 09 Jul 1846 | Castro answered in the negative. |
| 09 Jul 1846 | At 8:00 a.m., Commander John B. Montgomery, with 70 sailors and marines, landed at Yerba Buena, raised the American flag, and claimed San Francisco Bay for the United States. Lt. John S. Missroon read Sloat's proclamation. No Mexican officials were in Yerba Buena. |
| 09 Jul 1846 | Later that day, Lt. Joseph Warren Revere repeated this ceremony in Sonoma Plaza. The Bear Flag was lowered, and the American flag was raised in its place. The 25-day Bear Flag Republic ended. |
| 10 Jul 1846 | At his camp, Frémont received a message from Montgomery on the U.S. Navy's occupation of Monterey and Yerba Buena. |
| 12 Jul 1846 | The American flag flew above Sutter's Fort and Bodega Bay. |
| 12 Jul 1846 | Frémont's party, including the Bear Flaggers, rode into New Helvetia, where a letter from Sloat awaited them, describing the capture of Monterey and ordering Frémont to bring at least 100 armed men to Monterey. Frémont would bring 160 men. |
| 15 Jul 1846 | Commodore Robert Field Stockton, sailing from Honolulu, arrived in Monterey to replace the 65-year-old Sloat in command of the Pacific Squadron. On July 23, Sloat named Stockton commander-in-chief of all land forces in California, and on July 29 transferred his whole command to Stockton. |
| 16 Jul 1846 | Frémont raised the U.S. flag over San Juan Bautista. |
| 16 Jul 1846 | Governor Pico issued a proclamation on the American invasion and a conscription order for Mexican citizens, which produced about 100 men to join with Castro's force. |
| 19 Jul 1846 | Frémont's party entered Monterey. Frémont met with Sloat on board the Savannah. When Sloat learned "to his horror" that Frémont had acted on his own authority without orders or knowledge of war, Sloat abruptly ended the meeting. |
| 23 Jul 1846 | Stockton mustered Frémont's party and the former Bear Flaggers into military service as the "Naval Battalion of Mounted Volunteer Riflemen" with Frémont in command. |
| 26 Jul 1846 | Stockton ordered Frémont and his battalion to San Diego to prepare to move northward to Los Angeles. |
| 29 Jul 1846 | Sloat ordered the release of Vallejo and the other prisoners at Sutter's Fort. Sloat turned command over to Stockton and left for home. Stockton issued a proclamation annexing California to the U.S. General Castro in Santa Clara subsequently began to move south to Los Angeles with about 100 men. |
| 29 Jul 1846 | The battalion landed and raised the U.S. flag in San Diego. |
| late Jul 1846 | A garrison of Stockton's men raised the U.S. flag at Santa Barbara. |
| 01 Aug 1846 | An ill and much thinner Vallejo was released from Sutter's Fort. While in confinement, 1000 of his cattle and 600 horses were stolen. |
| 01 Aug 1846 | Stockton's 360 men arrived in San Pedro. |
| 02 Aug 1846 | Two representatives of Castro arrived at Stockton's camp with a message expressing Castro's willingness to negotiate for peace. Stockton rejected the terms of the letter. |
| 07 Aug 1846 | Stockton penned a return message to Castro, who also rejected its terms, including that California cease to be part of Mexico. |
| 09 Aug 1846 | Castro held a war council at La Mesa, expressed doubts about his forces, and wrote a farewell address to the people of California. Governor Pico read Castro's message to the legislature in Los Angeles, which then adjourned sine die. Pico penned an open farewell letter. |
| 10 Aug 1846 | Castro and 20 men rode toward the Colorado River and reached the Mexican state of Sonora in September. Pico left to hide out in San Juan Capistrano for one month and eventually made his way to Baja California and Sonora. |
| 12 Aug 1846 | Official notice of the U.S. declaration of war reached Monterey aboard the Warren. |
| 13 Aug 1846 | Stockton's army entered Los Angeles unopposed. |
| 17 Aug 1846 | Stockton issued a proclamation announcing that California was now part of the United States. |
| 22 Aug 1846 | Stockton sent a report to Secretary of State Bancroft that "California is entirely free from Mexican dominion." |
| 02 Sep 1846 | Stockton divided California into three military districts. |
| 05 Sep 1846 | Stockton, his sailors and marines set sail for Monterey. |
| 23 Sep 1846 | In Los Angeles, 20 California irregulars under militia captain Cerbulo Varela, chafing under Archibald Gillespie's tyrannical administration of martial law, assaulted the barracks of the small U.S. garrison and were repulsed. |
| 25 Sep 1846 | Stephen Kearny's 300-man force departed from Santa Fe. |
| 27 Sep 1846 | Californios skirmished with and captured 24 Americans led by Benjamin D. Wilson, who were hiding at Rancho Santa Ana del Chino, and suffered one dead. |
| 29 Sep 1846 | The rebel forces grew to 300 and demanded Gillespie's surrender in a manifesto. General Jose Maria Flores offered to let the Americans leave unharmed. Gillespie's garrison surrendered, taking refuge at San Pedro Bay on a merchant ship. |
| 01 Oct 1846 | At Yerba Buena, Stockton received news of the insurrection of armed Californians in Los Angeles and its impending fall. |
| 01 Oct 1846 | Fifty of Flores' men took San Diego when the small American garrison of less than 20 men retreated. At Santa Barbara, the 10-man U.S. garrison also surrendered the town and escaped under pressure. |
| 06 Oct 1846 | Ten miles south of Socorro, New Mexico, the eastern-bound Kit Carson and his express party encountered Kearny's forces heading west. Upon learning California had easily fallen, Kearny sent 200 of his 300 men back to Santa Fe. Kearny ordered Carson to guide his reduced force to San Diego. |
| 07 Oct 1846 | Captain William Mervine landed 350 sailors and marines at San Pedro. |
| 08 Oct 1846 | The "Battle of the Old Woman's Gun" (a Mexican four-pounder cannon) occurred north of Rancho Dominguez between forces of Flores and Mervine; it lasted less than an hour. Four Americans died, and eight were severely injured in the ambush. Mervine's forces returned to San Pedro Bay, where Mervine's warship then departed toward Monterey. |
| 11 Oct 1846 | Frémont and 170 men arrived at Yerba Buena. |
| 12 Oct 1846 | Stockton departed for San Pedro with his forces on the Congress. |
| 23 Oct 1846 | Stockton arrived at San Pedro, finding that Mervine's ship had returned. The American forces thus grew to 800 in San Pedro. |
| 27 Oct 1846 | Frémont and his men arrived in Monterey after sailing from Yerba Buena, in order to gather horses and volunteers. |
| late Oct 1846 | The tiny American garrison that fled San Diego several weeks earlier landed a short distance from San Diego and re-took the village after firing three small cannons at Flores' men. |
| late Oct 1846 | Stockton and Mervine arrived at San Diego with their forces to set up a base of operations. |
| 16 Nov 1846 | A skirmish, the Battle of la Natividad [Rancho], occurred near San Juan Bautista between California Battalion troops en route to Monterey and 130 Californians. Five to seven Americans and two Californians died. |
| 22 Nov 1846 | Kearny's 100-man force learned from Mexican herders that Los Angeles had been taken away from the Americans. |
| 30 Nov 1846 | Frémont, 430 men and 2000 horses and mules started out for Los Angeles. |
| 02 Dec 1846 | Kearny reached Warner's Ranch, 50 miles northeast of San Diego. |
| 03 Dec 1846 | Stockton received a message from Kearny and sent Gillespie and a 35-man patrol riding out to meet him. |
| 05 Dec 1846 | Gillespie's party met up with Kearny's forces, who were riding from Santa Ysabel to San Pascual (near the modern town of Ramona, CA). Gillespie told Kearny that 100 soldiers under Captain Andres Pico (younger brother of the deposed governor) were posted 10 miles ahead. |
| 05 Dec 1846 | An eight-man night horseback patrol botched a reconnaissance, tipping off the Mexican forces to their presence. |
| 06 Dec 1846 | Kearny's army of about 150 men approached San Pascual at dawn but was strung out for nearly a mile. Pico's men were lying in wait. The battle began by mistake when a captain misheard a Kearny order and began a charge, opening gaps in the line of march. The battle lasted 30 minutes, ten of them in hand-to-hand combat, ending when two American howitzers at the rear of the line finally began firing. Twenty-two Americans died, 20 by lance wounds. Three U.S. officers were among the dead. Mexican casualties as reported by Pico were 11 wounded; as reported by Kearny, six dead on the field. |
| 07 Dec 1846 | Three men left camp to deliver a message to Stockton and were captured by Pico on their way back from San Diego. The wounded Kearny and his remaining force reached the San Bernardo riverbed and encountered a detachment of lancers, who opened fire. Kearny's forces scrambled up a low hill (later called "Mule Hill" by the soldiers) and repulsed the Californians in a brief skirmish, with no American casualties. However, Pico kept the hill under siege. |
| 08 Dec 1846 | A prisoner exchange (one each) occurred, with two Americans remaining as prisoners. |
| 08 Dec 1846 | A three-man messenger party (including Kit Carson) left the hill at dusk, splitting up. |
| 08 Dec 1846 | At Yerba Buena, a small band of Californians seized the acting alcalde, Lt. Washington Bartlett. |
| 09 Dec 1846 | An American sergeant wounded at San Pascual died of his wounds at Mule Hill. |
| 09 Dec 1846 | The three messengers reached San Diego and Commodore Stockton separately on December 9, 10 and 11. |
| 11 Dec 1846 | A 215-man American relief expedition reached Mule Hill before dawn. |
| 11 Dec 1846 | The 350-man American force rode to San Bernardo Rancho. Pico, with his forces reinforced to 250 men but facing superior numbers, abandoned the field before the Americans' arrival, leaving his army's cattle herd behind. |
| 14 Dec 1846 | Frémont and the 428-man California Battalion arrived in San Luis Obispo and captured several local officials who were still in contact with General Flores. |
| 16 Dec 1846 | The prisoners were freed, in order to allow word of Frémont's overwhelming numbers to spread before them. |
| 17 Dec 1846 | Frémont resumed his march to Los Angeles. |
| 27 Dec 1846 | Frémont reached a deserted Santa Barbara and raised the American flag. |
| 28 Dec 1846 | The 600-man Army of the West under Kearny began a 150-mile march to Los Angeles. |
| late Dec 1846 | Frémont occupied a hotel close to the adobe of Bernarda Ruiz de Rodriguez, a wealthy educated woman of influence and Santa Barbara town matriarch, who had four sons on the Mexican side. She asked for and was granted ten minutes of Frémont's time, which stretched to two hours; she advised him that a generous peace would be to his political advantage – one that included Pico's pardon, release of prisoners, equal rights for all Californians and respect of property rights. Frémont later wrote, "I found that her object was to use her influence to put an end to the war, and to do so upon such just and friendly terms of compromise as would make the peace acceptable and enduring. ... She wished me to take into my mind this plan of settlement, to which she would influence her people; meantime, she urged me to hold my hand, so far as possible. ... I assured her I would bear her wishes in mind when the occasion came." |
| early Jan 1847 | General Flores headquartered at San Fernando with 500 poorly equipped men. |
| 02 Jan 1847 | A party of American marines and sailors skirmished with a force of 120 Californians at Yerba Buena under Francisco Sanchez. Four Californians died. |
| 03 Jan 1847 | At Yerba Buena, Sanchez agreed to a cease-fire. |
| 04 Jan 1847 | The Stockton-Kearny force reached San Luis Rey. Stockton rejected a cease-fire proposal that was sent under a truce flag from General Flores. They proceeded toward San Juan Capistrano. A message to Stockton told of Frémont's presence at Santa Barbara. |
| 05 Jan 1847 | Frémont, near the San Buenaventura Mission with the California Battalion and six field pieces, dispersed a force of 60–70 Californio lancers. |
| 06 Jan 1847 | At Yerba Buena, Sanchez surrendered unconditionally. |
| 07 Jan 1847 | Flores moved his force to a 50-foot-high bluff above the San Gabriel River, 12 miles northeast of Los Angeles. |
| 08 Jan 1847 | Stockton's army advanced toward the Californians' position and began crossing the river. Musket and cannon fire by Flores' forces, handicapped by poor quality powder, inflicted few casualties. Following the crossing and destructive American cannon fire, Kearny's men began their charge up the hill, and the Californians retreated. The Battle of Rio San Gabriel lasted two hours. Two American sailors were killed, with 8 men wounded. |
| 08 Jan 1847 | Frémont arrived at San Fernando. |
| 09 Jan 1847 | The Stockton–Kearny army resumed their march and met a smaller force of Flores' men. Following a two-and-a-half-hour fight, the Americans won the Battle of La Mesa, suffering only five wounded. The army then camped three miles from Los Angeles. |
| 10 Jan 1847 | The army entered Los Angeles with no resistance, and Gillespie raised the U.S. flag over his old headquarters. |
| 11 Jan 1847 | Frémont learned of the reoccupation of Los Angeles. |
| 11 Jan 1847 | Flores turned over his command to Andres Pico and fled toward Sonora. |
| 12 Jan 1847 | Frémont and two of Pico's officers agreed to the terms for a surrender, and Articles of Capitulation were penned by Jose Antonio Carrillo in both English and Spanish. |
| 13 Jan 1847 | At a deserted rancho at the north end of Cahuenga Pass (modern-day North Hollywood), John Frémont, Andres Pico and six others signed the Articles of Capitulation, which became known as the Treaty of Cahuenga. This unofficial truce, which did not have the backing of the American government and had nothing to do with the Mexican government, was honored by both the Americans and Californios. Fighting ceased, thus ending the war in California. |
| 14 Jan 1847 | The California Battalion entered Los Angeles in a rainstorm. |
| 15 Jan 1847 | Stockton approved the Treaty of Cahuenga in a message sent to Navy Secretary Bancroft. |
| 14 Sep 1847 | The U.S. Army stormed Chapultapec Castle in Mexico City, the last major military action of the war. In winning the war, 13,000 Americans died during its 17 months, 1700 of them from wounds sustained in battle. 11,300 others died, mainly from disease. |
| 2 Feb 1848 | Treaty of Guadalupe Hidalgo was signed in Mexico City. |

== See also ==
- Conquest of California topics
- Alta California topics
- Mexican–American War
  - Pacific Coast Campaign
- History of California through 1899
- Indigenous peoples of California
