= Siege of Los Angeles =

1846 event of the Mexican-American War

- Part of the Conquest of California during the Mexican–American War
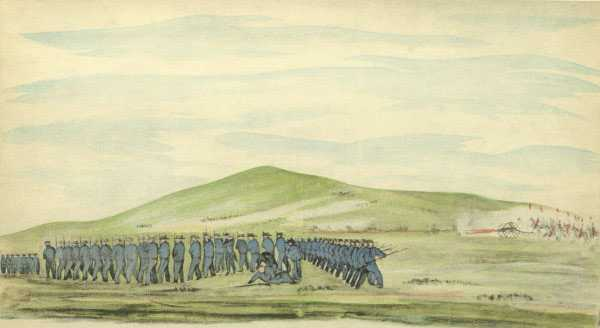
- American forces retreating to San Pedro following their defeat in the Siege of Los Angeles
Date	September 22–30, 1846 (1 week and 1 day)
Location	Los Angeles, Alta California, Mexico 34.0522°N 118.2440°W
Result	Mexican victory

Belligerents
United States	Mexico

Commanders and leaders
Archibald H. Gillespie (surrendered)	Serbulo Varela; José María Flores; Andrés Pico

Strength
48 Marines^{[a]}	150 militia^{[a]}

Casualties and losses
48 captured	None

The siege of Los Angeles, was a military response by armed Mexican civilians to the August 1846 occupation of the Pueblo de Los Ángeles by the United States Marines during the Mexican–American War.

== Background ==
Following the Battle of Monterey, the Americans held northern California but General José María Castro and Governor Pío Pico planned resistance in the south around the Los Angeles area.^{[a]} Commodore Robert F. Stockton arrived at Monterey Bay aboard the Congress on July 15 and took over command from John D. Sloat.^{[a]} Stockton accepted the Bear Flag revolutionaries, under the command of Major John C. Frémont, as the California Battalion.^{[a]} Stockton then garrisoned Sonoma, San Juan Bautista, Santa Clara, and Sutter's Fort.^{[a]} Stockton's plan for dealing with Castro was to have Commander Samuel Francis Du Pont carry Fremont's men in the Cyane to San Diego to block any movement southwards, while Stockton would land a force at San Pedro which would move overland against Castro.^{[a]} Fremont arrived at San Diego on July 29 and reached San Pedro on August 6 aboard the Congress.^{[a]}

== Occupation ==
Upon holding a council of war, Castro decided to leave California, heading to Sonora with Pico and a few supporters on August 11, while the rest of his force retired to Rancho San Pascual.^{[a]}

On August 13, 1846, Stockton led his column into town, followed by Fremont's force a half-hour later.^{[a]} On August 14, the remnants of the Californio army surrendered.^{[a]}

== Resistance ==
Stockton established a garrison of forty-eight men under Captain Archibald H. Gillespie and departed in September^{[a]} His men, however, were undisciplined in an area with pro-Mexican feelings.^{[a]}

== Siege ==
On September 23, twenty men under the command of Serbulo Varela exchanged shots with the Americans at Government House, which ignited Los Angeles.^{[a]} On September 24, 150 Californios, organized under José María Flores, a Mexican Officer who remained in California, at Castro's old camp at La Mesa.^{[a]} Gillespie's forces were effectively besieged, while Gillespie sent Juan "Flaco" Brown to Commodore Stockton for help.^{[a]}

Gillespie's men retreated to Fort Hill on September 28, but without water, they surrendered the next day.^{[a]} Terms called for Gillespie's men to leave Los Angeles, which they did on September 30, 1846, and boarded the American merchant vessel Vandalia.^{[a]}

Flores quickly cleared the remaining American forces in southern California.^{[a]}

== See also ==
- Pueblo de Los Ángeles
- List of battles of the Mexican–American War
- List of conflicts in the United States
- Captain John Strother Griffin (1816–1898), physician during the battle
