= José María Flores =

Military Commander of Mexican Forces in California during American Invasion of 1846

Secretary of Governor
- In office December 30, 1842 – February 22, 1845
- Appointed by: Manuel Micheltorena

Senior Captain of Mexican Forces in Alta California
- In office September 1846 – January 1847
- President: Antonio López de Santa Anna
- Preceded by: José Castro (Fled California August 1846)
- Succeeded by: Andrés Pico (after Battle of La Mesa)

11th Governor of Mexican California
- In office November 1, 1846 – January 10, 1847
- Appointed by: Self Appointed
- Preceded by: Pio Pico (Fled California August 1846)
- Succeeded by: Andrés Pico

Personal details
- Born: February 21, 1818 Hacienda de los Hornos, Nueva Extremadura, New Spain (now Viesca, Coahuila, Mexico)
- Died: April 1866 aged. 48 Mazatlán, Sinaloa, Mexico
- Spouse: Maria Dolores Francisca (m. 1843)
- Occupation: military commander; politician

Military service
- Allegiance: Mexico
- Branch/service: Mexican Army
- Years of service: 1846–1847
- Rank: Senior captain
- Commands: Mexican & Californio Troops in Southern California
- Battles/wars: Mexican-American War; California Campaign; Siege of Los Angeles; Battle of Chino; Battle of Dominguez Rancho; Battle of Rio San Gabriel; Battle of La Mesa

General José María Flores (1818–1866) was a captain in the Mexican Army and was a member of la otra banda. He was appointed Governor and Comandante General pro tem of Alta California from November 1846 to January 1847, and defended California against the Americans during the Mexican–American War.

== Mexican–American War ==
Captain José María Flores arrived in California in 1842. He was a secretary for Governor Manuel Micheltorena. He was a captain in Comandante General José Castro's military army. In August, 1846, Castro sent Flores to deliver a message to Stockton stating that Castro was willing to accede to the wishes of the United States. Stockton did not recognize Castro's authority and rejected it. Castro, seeing no alternative, fled California. Governor Pío Pico followed shortly thereafter. Flores and other military officers were left behind in Los Angeles.

Stockton placed Lieutenant Archibald H. Gillespie in charge of Los Angeles. Gillespie exerted tyrannical control of the populace. Californios, upset by Gillespie's iron grip, assembled a force to retake Los Angeles. Captain José María Flores, one of the officers, was chosen to act as comandante general. Captain José Antonio Carrillo was made second in command, while Captain Andrés Pico, as comandante de escuadrón, ranked third.

=== Battle of Chino ===
Flores's troops outnumbered Gillespie's. Flores demanded that the Americans leave. In September, 1846, Gillespie agreed to leave Los Angeles. Gillespie sent for Benjamin Wilson in the San Bernardino area to bring a force of American sympathizers to aid in securing Los Angeles. Word reached José del Carmen Lugo that Wilson was looking for Lugo in order to arrest him. Lugo put together a Californio militia and went after Wilson. The two forces met at the Battle of Chino. Afterward Lugo took forty prisoners and turned them over to Flores. Flores asked Lugo to join forces with him, but Lugo declined. Flores wanted to send the prisoners to Mexico City, but many people opposed the idea. Benjamin Wilson sent a message to Gillespie asking him to leave California completely. On October 4, 1846, Gillespie left San Pedro. A few Chino prisoners were exchanged for Californio prisoners.

Flores began reclaiming California. Flores dispatched Manuel Garfias to retake Santa Barbara. Garfias accomplished his mission without a fight. Manuel Castro was sent to secure the north. He occupied San Luis Obispo. Francisco Rico was sent south to retake San Diego. He did not make it there, because he was recalled back to Los Angeles. Rico sent a few Californios to watch over San Diego and to keep the Americans at bay.

Flores now had control of California from San Luis Obispo to San Diego, but his army had few arms and little ammunition. All male inhabitants of Southern California were asked to become soldiers. However, only about 200 men were kept in active service.

On October 6, 1846, 420 Americans, including 203 United States Marines, led by Captain William Mervine landed at San Pedro. Flores dispatched José Antonio Carrillo with fifty Californio Lancers to meet the advancing American forces, while remaining regular military forces remained to secure Los Angeles.

=== Battle of Dominguez Rancho ===
On October 7, 1846, the American forces advanced to the Spanish adobe buildings of the Dominguez Rancho. Flores and some of his troops joined Carrillo's forces, mostly local Californio cattle ranchers, to engage Mervine's forces. On October 8 they defeated the marines in a one-hour battle, killing four while suffering zero casualties, and driving the Americans back to San Pedro Bay. This was the Battle of Dominguez Rancho, and in history, one of the few times US Marines have ever been defeated in battle. This victory was also a high-water mark for the Californios' control of their territory.

=== Comandante general ===
On October 26, 1846, Flores called the Departmental Assembly of California into session and reorganized the remaining California government. On November 1 Flores became the temporary governor and comandante general. On December 3, Francisco Rico and José Antonio Carrillo revolted against Flores. Flores was placed under arrest for his alleged scheme against the Chino prisoners and for allegedly stealing war funds. Flores decided not to send the Chino prisoners to Mexico City and no evidence was found in regards to the missing funds. On December 5 he was restored to power. Rico and Carrillo were jailed for the revolt, but released shortly afterward.

=== Battle of San Pasqual ===
Flores needed help from the national Mexican government. He sent Captain Antonio Coronel and a few men to Sonora to get reinforcements. En route the men learned of General Stephen W. Kearny’s advance. A messenger was sent to Flores. Flores sent Andrés Pico to encounter the Americans. The Battle of San Pasqual soon followed.

After the victorious battle, Flores requested that Pico return to Los Angeles, but to leave men in the south to watch the American movements. After the battle a few Californios were killed at the Pauma Massacre. Flores sent José del Carmen Lugo and his militia to Temecula to avenge the killings. The Temecula Massacre soon followed.

By January 4, 1847, Stockton and Kearny had joined forces (totalling 660 men) and were marching towards the Los Angeles area. In the north, John Charles Fremont was advancing with 320 men south towards Los Angeles. Flores sent messengers requesting a truce lasting until eventual word from Mexico City about an end to the war. It was a delay tactic. Stockton refused. He requested unconditional surrender. He stated that all would be given amnesty except Flores, who would be shot or taken prisoner.

=== Battle of Rio San Gabriel ===
On January 8, 1847, Stockton's army encountered Flores's Californios at the Battle of Rio San Gabriel. The Americans won a hard-fought battle and Flores regrouped.

=== Battle of La Mesa ===
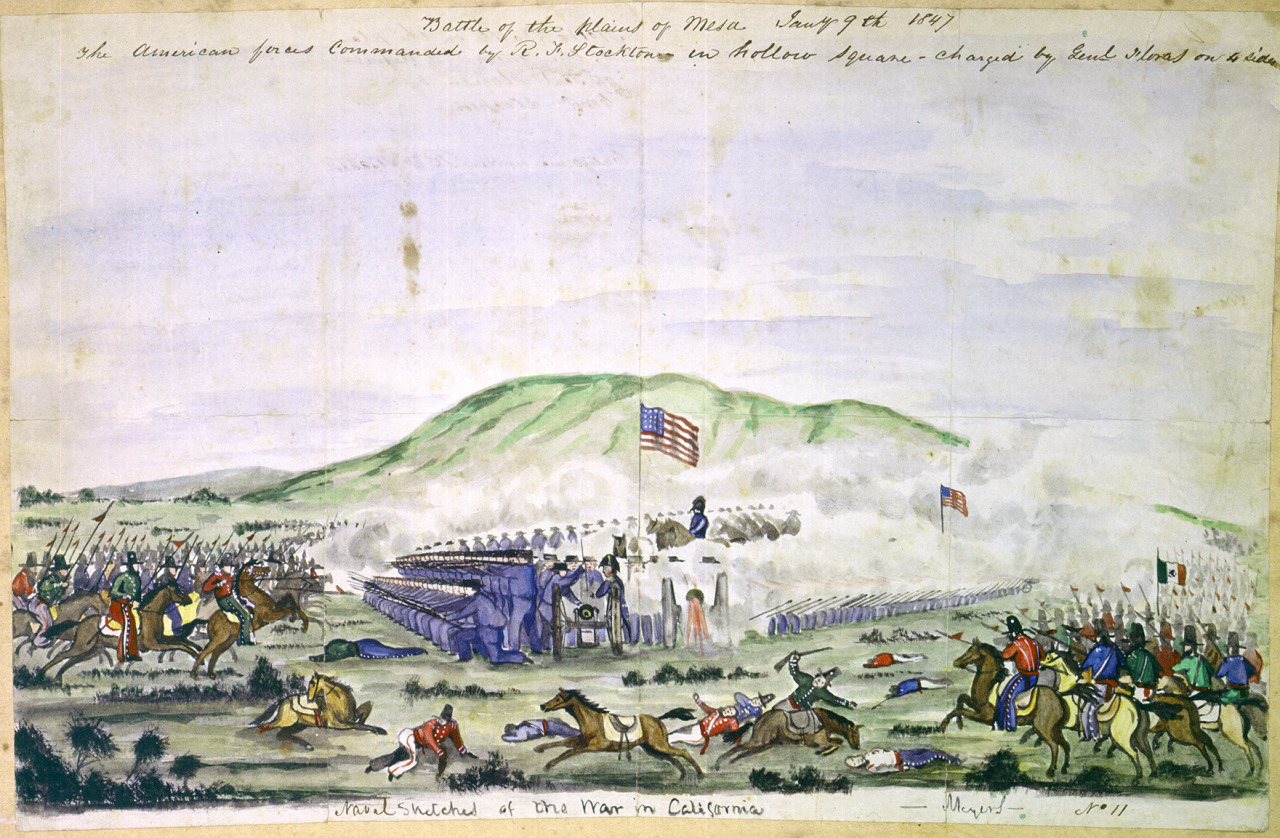
The Battle of La Mesa

On January 9, 1847, Flores's troops encountered Stockton's forces one last time at the Battle of La Mesa. By January 12, Flores's troops offered a flag of truce.

On January 10, 1847, Flores left Los Angeles and stayed at Los Verdugos. He held a final council, in which he decided to leave California. He transferred command to Andrés Pico and departed that night, the 11th, for Sonora. Before leaving Los Angeles he released all of the prisoners.
