= Battle of La Mesa =

1847 battle during the Conquest of California

- Part of the Conquest of California during the Mexican–American War
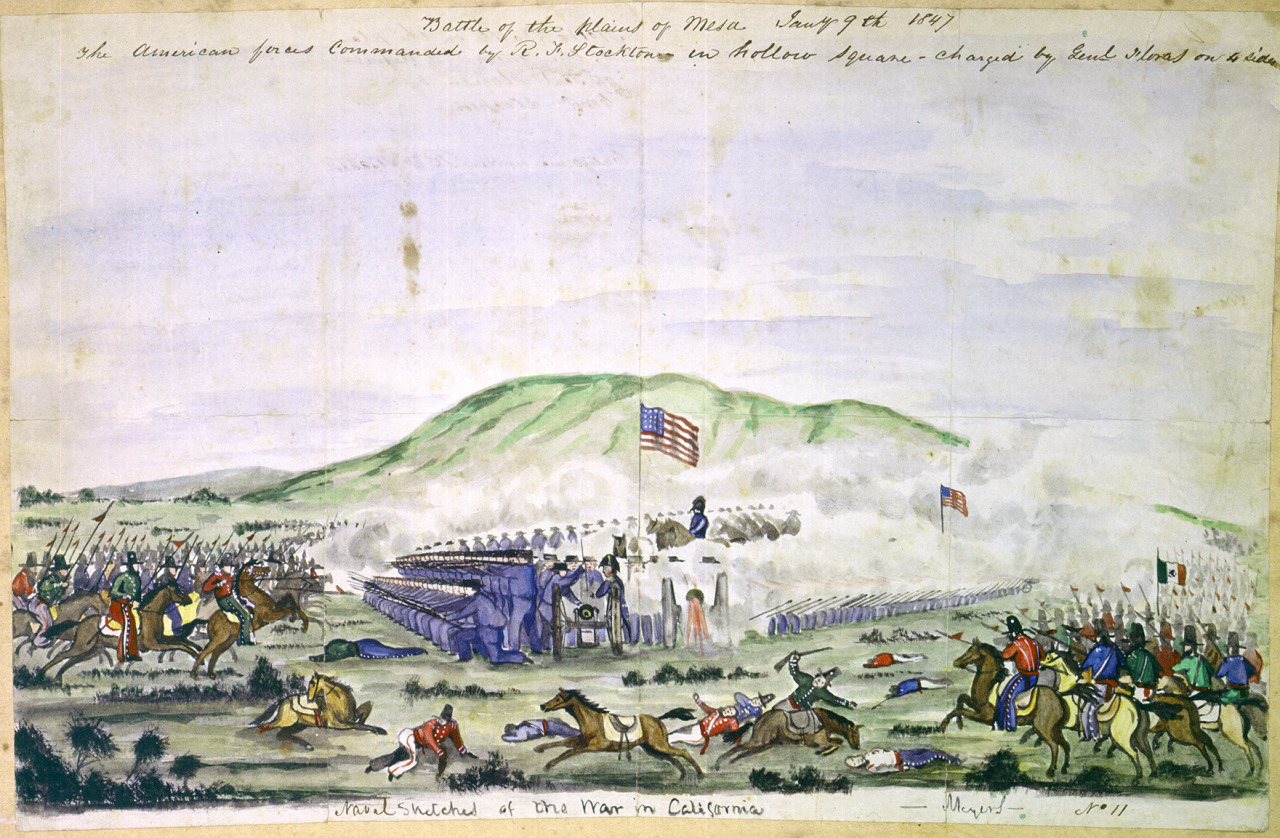
Date	January 9, 1847
Location	Rancho San Antonio, Alta California, Mexico (battlefields now parts of); Los Angeles River; Modern Cities: Vernon, CA 34°0′8.65″N 118°12′17.36″W
Result	American victory

Belligerents
United States	Mexico

Commanders and leaders
Robert F. Stockton; Stephen Watts Kearny; John C. Fremont	José María Flores

Strength
607	300

Casualties and losses
1 killed 5 wounded	1 killed 20+ wounded

California Historical Landmark
- Official name: La Mesa Battlefield
- Reference no.: 167

The Battle of La Mesa (also known as the Battle of Los Angeles) was the final battle of the California Campaign during the Mexican–American War, occurring on January 9, 1847, in present-day Vernon, California, the day after the Battle of Rio San Gabriel. The battle was a victory for the United States Army under Commodore Robert F. Stockton and General Stephen Watts Kearny.

== Background ==
Not finding any Californios at Governor Pío Pico's ranch, the Americans under Stockton and Kearny crossed the plain between the San Gabriel River and the Los Angeles River called La Mesa. They encountered José María Flores' 300-strong force of Californio militia, including artillery, near where the city of Vernon now stands, about four miles south of Los Angeles.

== Battle ==
The Californio guns were ineffective, while the American guns responded from their square as the Americans advanced. Flores extended his line and brought up two more guns. Stockton halted and formed his guns into a single battery. After fifteen minutes, Stockton's fire drove the Californio artillery from effective range. Flores sent his lancers against the American left flank but were driven back; most of his men deserted, allowing the Americans to advance into Los Angeles.

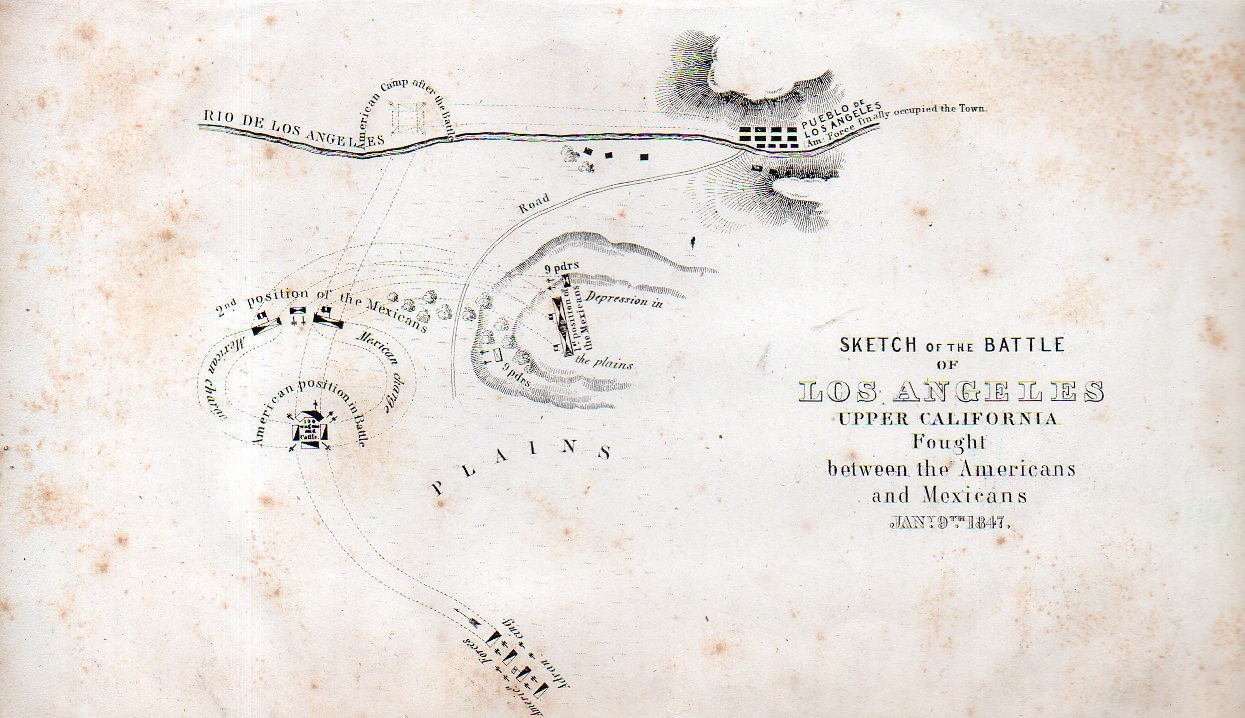
Map of how the battle turned out

== Aftermath ==
The battle was the last armed resistance to the American conquest of California, and General José María Flores returned to Mexico afterward. Three days after the battle, on January 12, the last significant group of residents surrendered to U.S. forces. The conquest and annexation of Alta California was settled with the signing of the Treaty of Cahuenga by U.S. Army Lieutenant-Colonel John C. Frémont and Mexican General Andrés Pico on January 13, 1847.

The site of the battle is now registered as California Historical Landmark #167. The marker is located at 4490 Exchange Avenue at Downey Road in Vernon.

== California Historical Landmark Marker ==
California Historical Landmark Marker No. 167
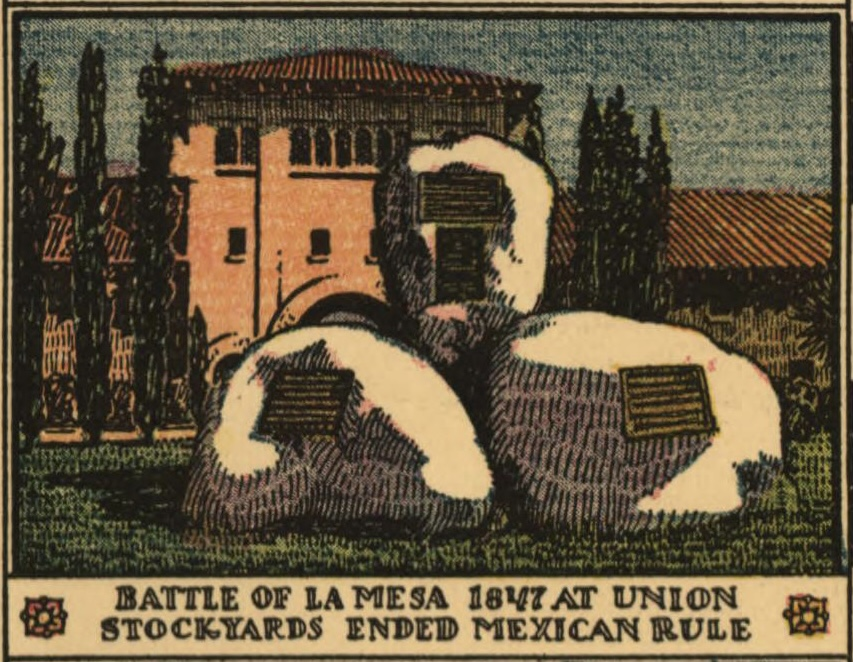
"Battle of La Mesa 1847 at Union Stockyards Ended Mexican Rule" (1929)

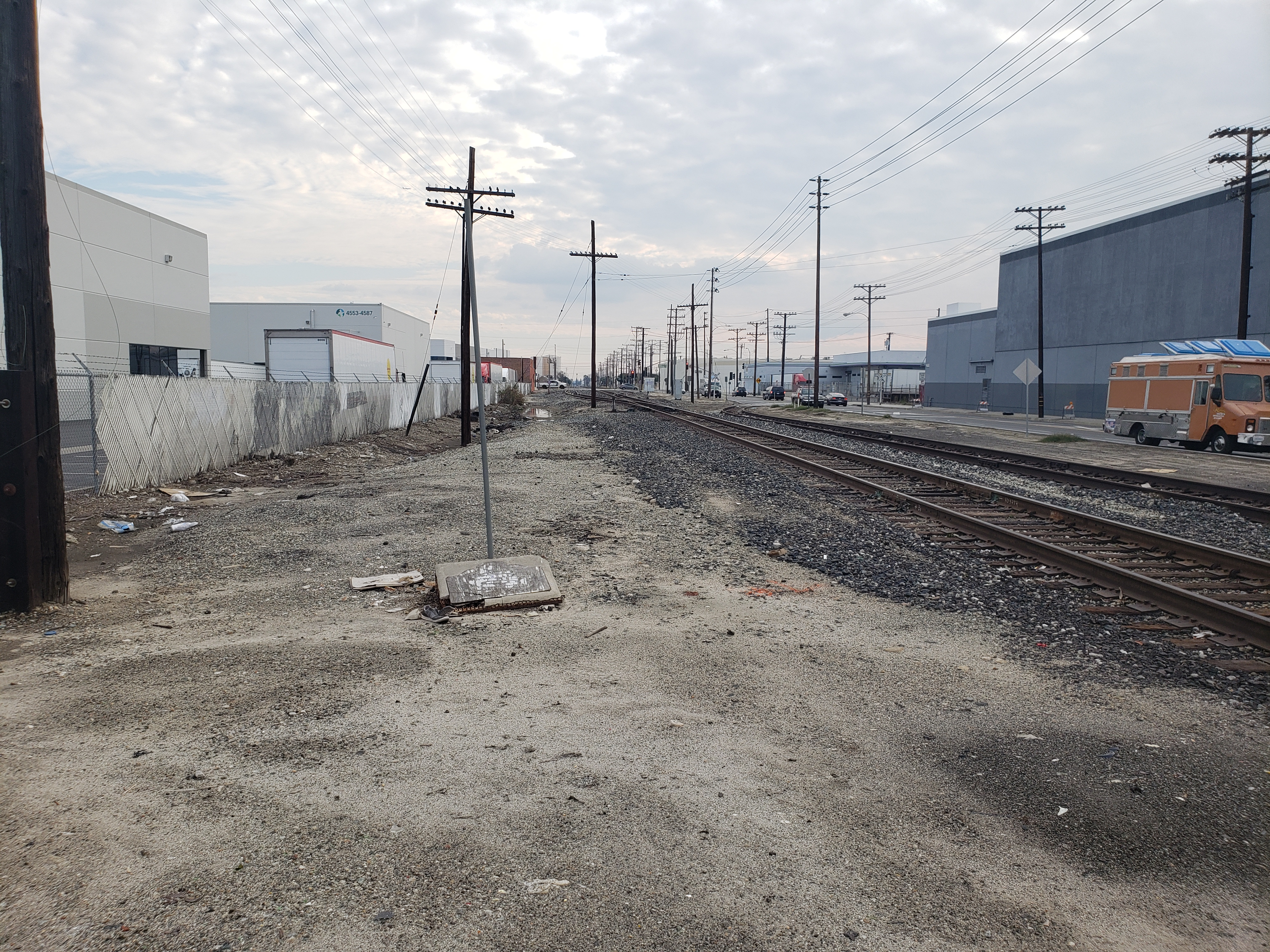
Original location marker for Battle of La Mesa (possible area of Mexican camp during battle)

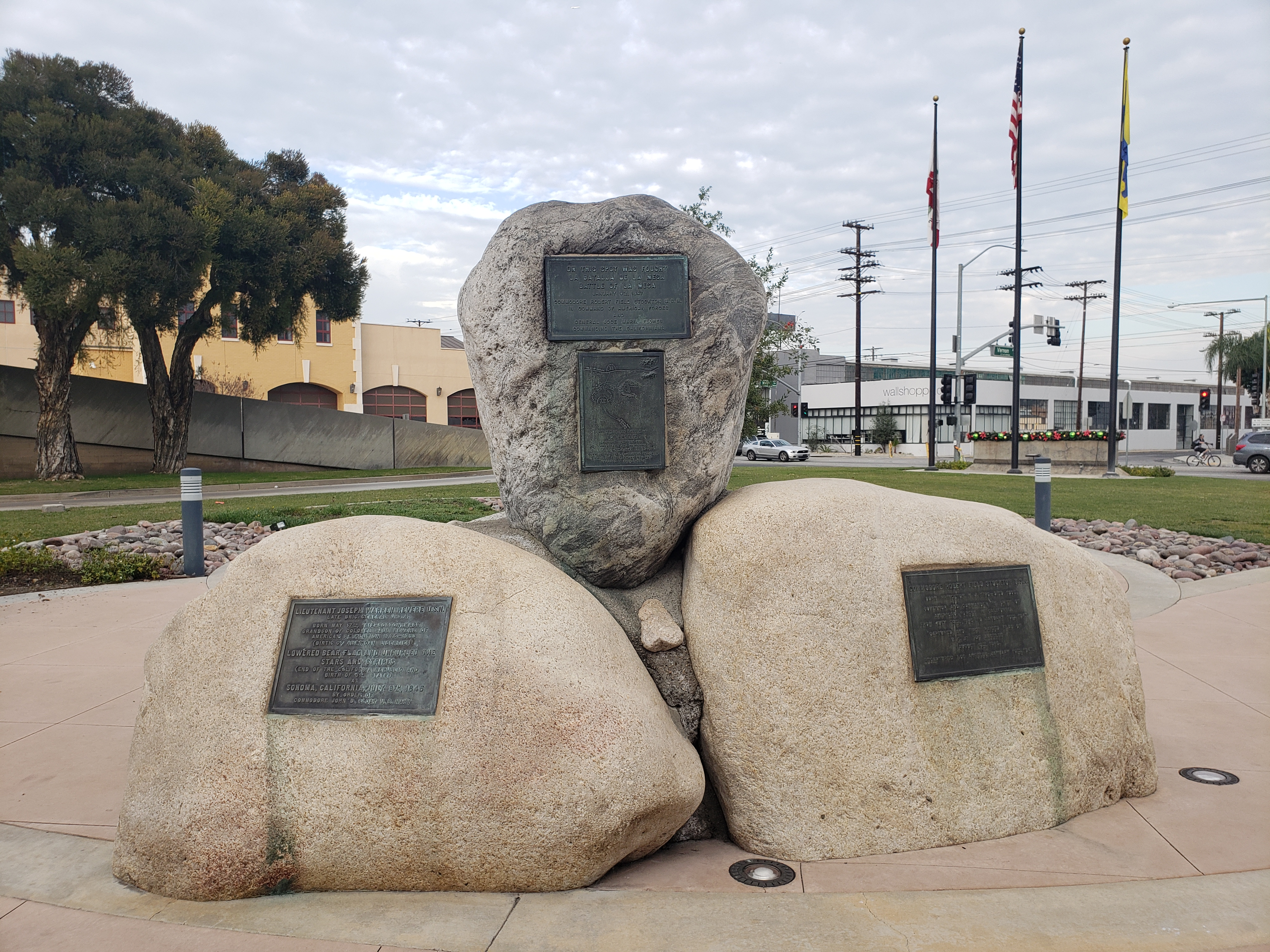
New Marker outside Vernon City Hall

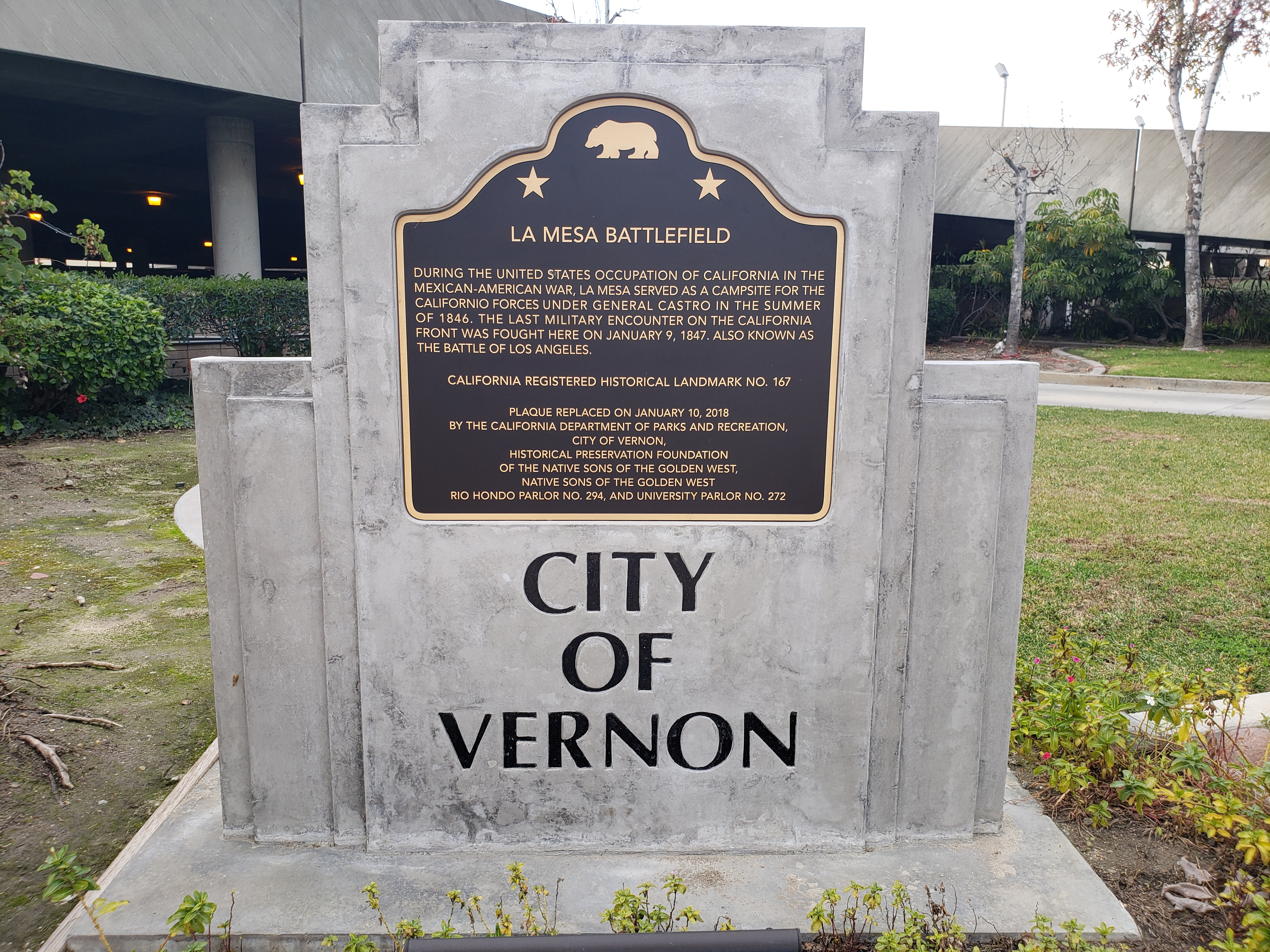
New marker outside Vernon City Hall

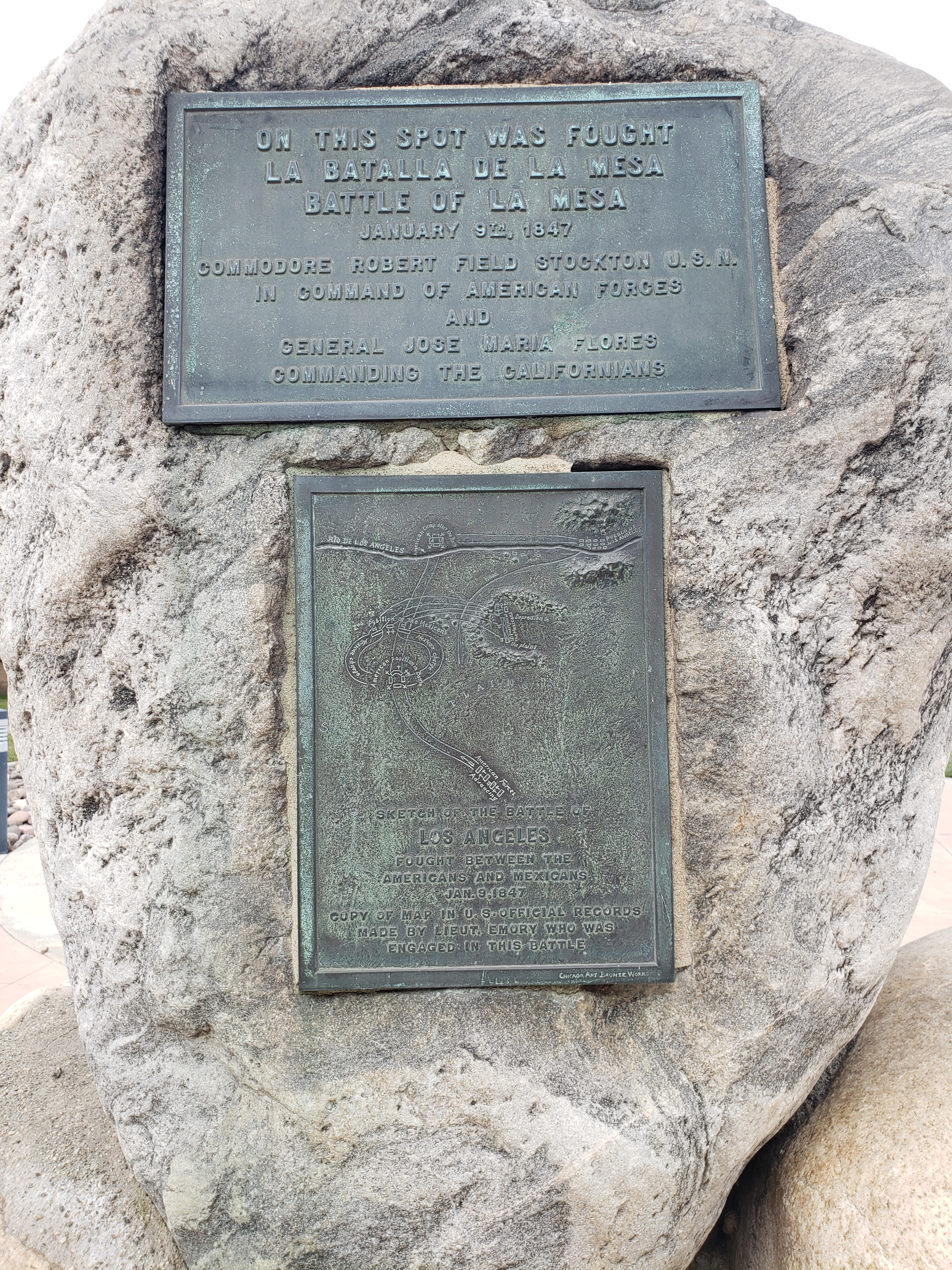
Plaque showing battle map

California Historical Landmark Marker No. 167 at the site reads:

- NO. 167 LA MESA BATTLEFIELD - La Mesa Battlefield served as a campsite for the California forces under General Castro in the summer of 1846, during the United States' occupation of California in the Mexican War. The battle of La Mesa, last military encounter of the war on the California front, was fought here January 9, 1847.

== See also ==
- Bibliography of Los Angeles
- Outline of the history of Los Angeles
- Bibliography of California history
- Los Angeles Union Stock Yards, site of original La Mesa battle historical marker
- List of conflicts in the United States
- Battles of the Mexican–American War
- Captain John Strother Griffin (1816–1898), physician during the battle
