= Archibald H. Gillespie =

US Marine Corps officer (1812-1873)

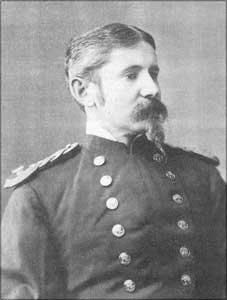
- Born: October 10, 1812; New York City, U.S.
- Died: August 16, 1873 (aged 60); San Francisco, California, U.S.
- Military career
- Allegiance: United States of America
- Branch: United States Marine Corps
- Service years: 1832–1854
- Rank: Major
- Conflicts: Mexican–American War

Major Archibald H. Gillespie (October 10, 1812 – August 16, 1873) was an officer in the United States Marine Corps during the Mexican–American War.

== Biography ==
Born in New York City, Gillespie was commissioned in the Marine Corps in 1832. He commanded the Marine Guard on board the USS Fairfield, USS Vincennes, USS North Carolina, and USS Brandywine.

On October 30, 1845, Lt. Gillespie was sent by President James Polk with secret messages to the U.S. Consul Thomas O. Larkin in Monterey, California, Commodore John D. Sloat in command of the Pacific Squadron, and John C. Frémont. Traveling across Mexico, he caught a ship to California, where he delivered his messages to Larkin and Sloat. Finding that Frémont was on his way to Oregon, he borrowed a horse and hurried north, where he caught up with him near the Oregon border. After delivering his messages, Gillespie turned around and headed back to California, where he helped Frémont take over the Bear Flag Revolt of June 14, 1846, in California. He joined the Frémont volunteers in the California Battalion as its second in command after it was formed under Commodore Robert F. Stockton on July 18, 1846.

Gillespie accompanied Frémont and Stockton to San Diego on board the USS Cyane where he participated in the peaceful occupation of San Diego and Los Angeles.

Captain Gillespie, Frémont's second in command of the California Battalion, was left with from 30 to 40 men to occupy Los Angeles after it had surrendered to Frémont and Stockton's men on August 13, 1846. Frémont was sent back north to recruit more men and Stockton, with his Marines and blue coats returned to their ships of the Pacific Squadron.

In Los Angeles, the largest city in California with about 3,000 residents, things might have remained peaceful, except that Capt. Gillespie had placed the town under martial law. Californians "...could not walk two together down the street, nor gather together in their houses under any pretext..." greatly angering many of the Californios. On September 23, 1846, about 200–300 Californios staged a revolt, under Captain José Maria Flores, and exchanged shots with the Americans in their quarters at the Government House. Gillespie and his men withdrew from their headquarters in town to Fort Moore Hill which, unfortunately, had no water. Gillespie was caught in a trap, outnumbered more than ten to one by the besiegers. John Brown, an American, called by the Californios Juan Flaco, meaning "Lean John," succeeded in breaking through the Californio lines and riding to Yerba Buena, where he delivered to Stockton a dispatch from Gillespie notifying him of the situation. Gillespie, on September 30, finally accepted the terms of capitulation and departed for San Pedro with his forces, weapons and flags plus two cannon (the others were spiked and left behind), accompanied by the exchanged American prisoners and several American residents.

Later, Gillespie's forces fought in the Battle of San Pasqual, the Battle of Dominguez Rancho, and the Battle of Rio San Gabriel with U.S. Marines and California Battalion members successfully ending the abortive four-month battle for Los Angeles and southern California. The Treaty of Cahuenga in January 1847 ended all hostilities in California.

Returning to Washington, D.C., in 1847, he subsequently served there and at Pensacola, Florida, until resigning from the Marine Corps October 14, 1854. For his distinguished service in California, he was promoted to captain, and then major, by brevet. He died August 16, 1873, in San Francisco.

== Namesake ==
USS Gillespie (DD-609) was named for him, as was Gillespie Field airport in El Cajon, California.
