= Carmelita (Pasadena, California) =

Carr home and grove in Pasadena, California

Coordinates: 34.1465°N 118.1598°W

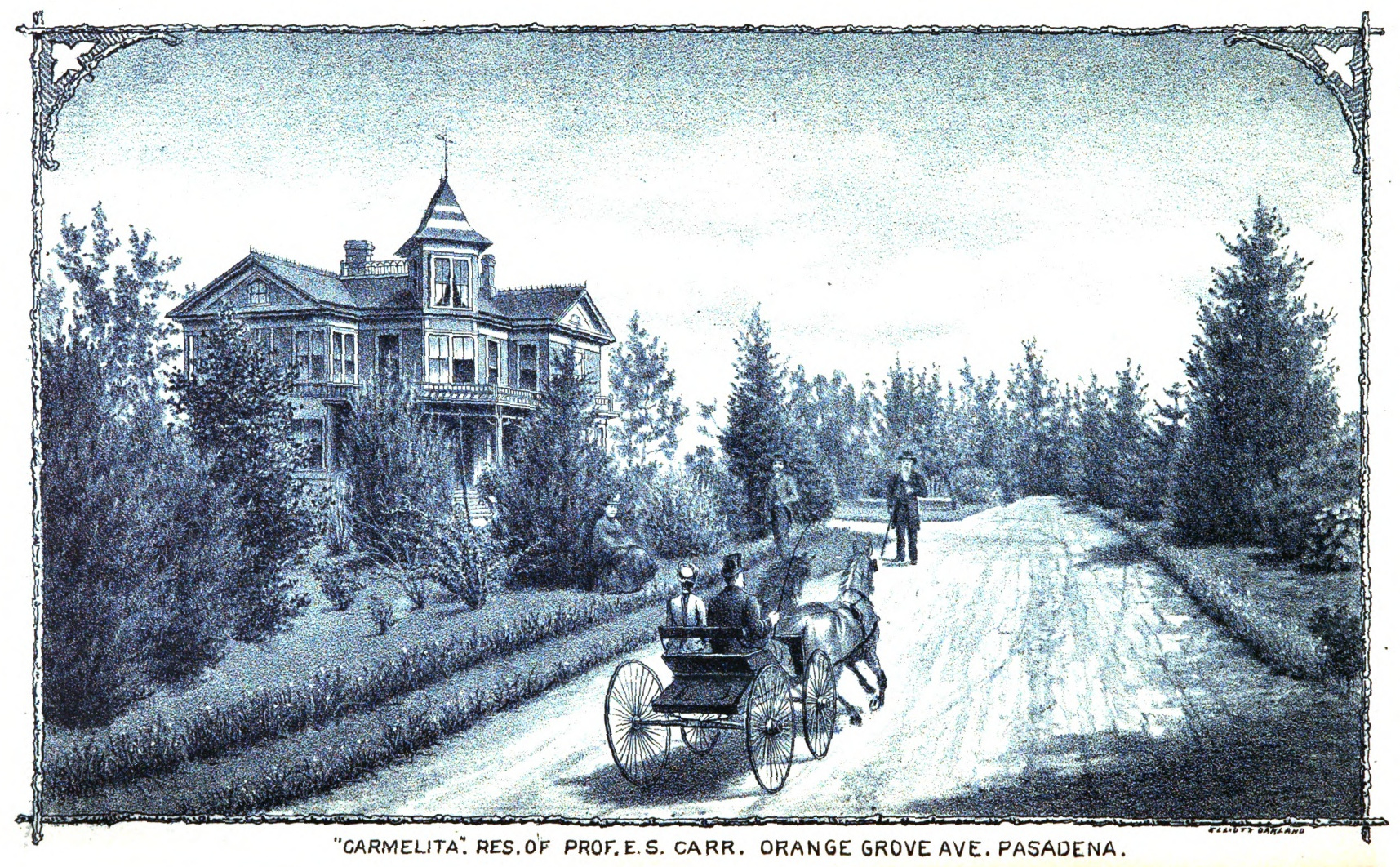
- "Carmelita", Carr residence, Orange Grove Avenue, Pasadena (1886)
- Town/City: Pasadena, California, U.S.
- Established: 1877
- Disestablished: 1968
- Owner: Prof. Ezra S. Carr & Jeanne C. Smith Carr (original)
- Area: 42 acres (17 ha)
- Produces: fruit; nuts

"Carmelita" (later, Carmelita Gardens and Carmelita Park) was an American property established in Pasadena by Jeanne C. Smith Carr and her husband, Prof. Ezra S. Carr. Purchased in 1877, for US$3,000, their 42 acres (17 ha) tract was located on the northeast corner of W. Colorado Boulevard and S. Orange Grove Boulevard. The home became a 19th-century intellectual center in Southern California. The grounds of "Carmelita" contained a rosebush with a national reputation. The Norton Simon Museum is located on the property previously owned by the Carrs.

== Grove ==
Jeanne Carr named the place "Carmelita", the meaning of "carmel" being "a grove", and she planned to fill the property with trees. She accomplished this within a few years. Seven acres were reclaimed and planted with over 1,000 citrus trees the first year. Fourteen were planted in the second year with 200 nut trees, including walnuts and pomegranates. In the third year, ten more acres were planted with an orchard and vines, including 50 varieties of grapes. In the fourth year, the last trees were planted.

Her vineyard consisted of 43 kinds of imported vines, as well as the principal American ones, numbering in all 3,000. Her orchard contained besides citrus fruits, apples, 35 varieties; plums, 25 varieties; persimons, 12: mulberries, 10, and these were in addition to apricot, cherry, fig, guava, jube, loquat, prunes, pears, and peaches. Of small fruits, she had 10 varieties of strawberry, raspberry and blackberry. Of nut trees, she had English walnuts, almonds, butternut, beachnuts, chestnuts, chickpecans, and filberts.

== 19th-century ==
The 42 acres (17 ha) tract was located in the San Gabriel Valley on the northeast corner of Colorado Street and Orange Grove Avenue. When the Carrs purchased the property, it was a barren land on which the sheep herd fed. It was thickly infested with rabbits, gophers, and squirrels. Jeanne conceived the idea of making this wilderness not only a blooming garden but also a paying one.

The house where she was living was a mere shanty, but she had planted grape and hop vines about it, which grew swiftly and festooned over the old walls, crooked windows, and low casings until the barn-like effect had entirely disappeared. Ezra sat at the open window and watched Jeanne as she went from post to post, in her outdoor work.

The Carrs lived in the property's cabin until 1883, when they built a home for US$7,000. Jeanne developed an orchard and vineyard. In the course of years, it became noted for several things; first, its great variety of fruit and ornamental trees and plants-more than 200 in all-which Jeanne had obtained from nearly every part of the world; for the hospitality extended by its hosts to many eminent people, drawn to "Carmelita" by the personalities of the owners; and as well because of its beauty and interest. In a log cabin on these grounds, it is said that Helen Hunt Jackson, while visiting the Carrs, wrote part of Ramona.

Five years from when Jeanne bought the sheep pasture at US$75 per acre, the same land, on account of the locating and building of a nearby town, had risen to US$2,000 per acre. She was thus enabled to build their house, which she made of redwood, big enough to accommodate many people. She added ornamental grounds outside of it.

The fourth year of her planting found Jeanne as a packer and shipper of citrus fruits and some nuts. Every year after, she added an increase to her business and a greater call for her produce. She sold grapes and preserved fruits in the San Francisco market. For many years, her produce was center to the shipping market of the San Gabriel Valley.

Later, because of financial troubles, she sold the citrus groves and repurposed the home into a boarding house.

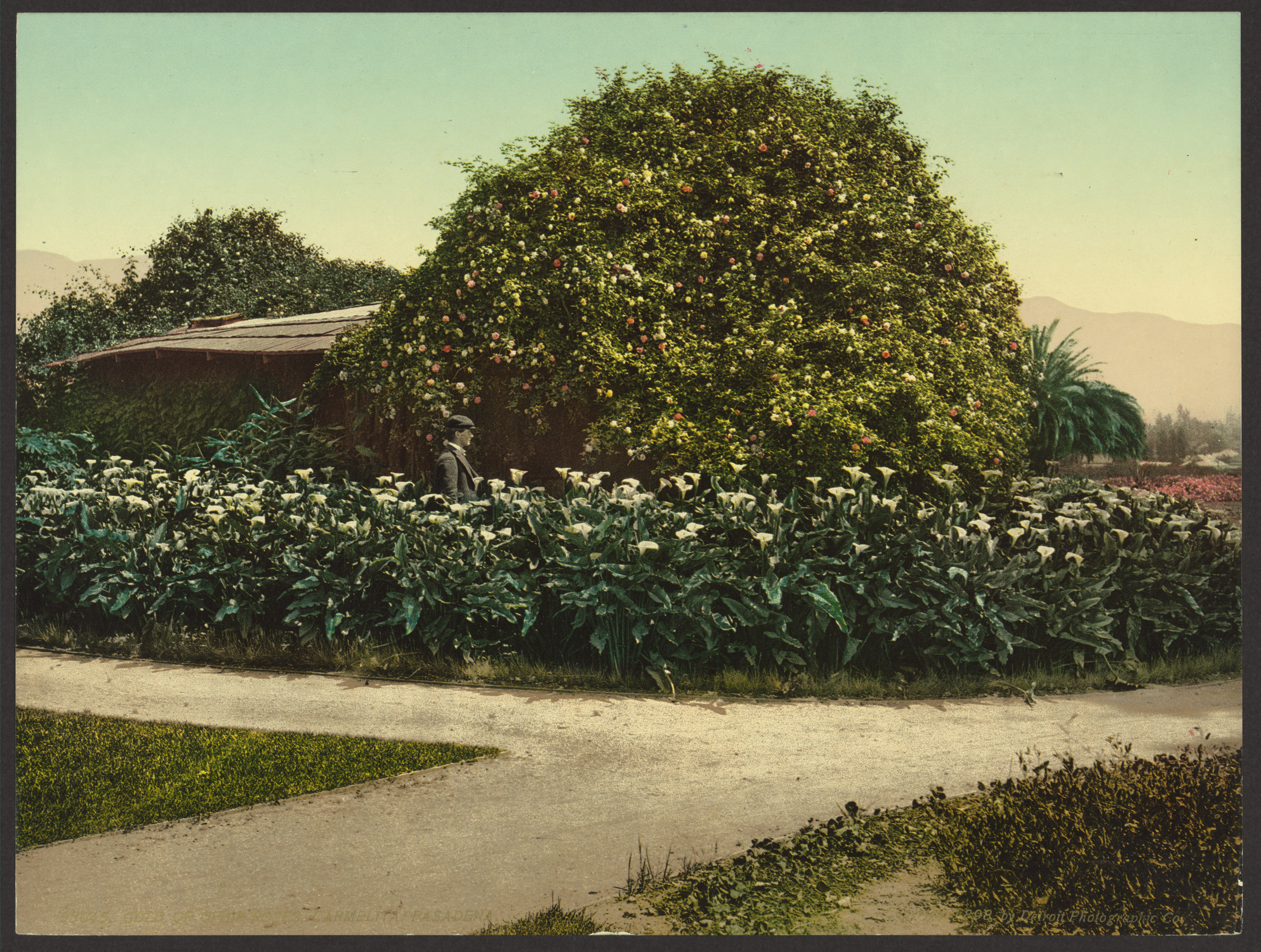
Gold of Ophir roses at "Carmelita", 1898

On the grounds of "Carmelita" was a rosebush with a national reputation. On postcards and in books of views, it was well known to tourists. The blossoms on the bush number in the thousands.

The Carr's sold the property in 1892, to Simeon Gannett Reed (died 1895) and his wife Amanda. After she was widowed, Amanda built a new home on the property and lived there until she died in 1904.

== 20th-century ==
"Carmelita" was purchased in 1905 by Lamon V. Harkness. The price is said to have been US$180,000

In 1906, it was rumored that John D. Rockefeller had purchased "Carmelita". The price paid was said to be US$300,000.

On January 31, 1907, it was announced that a name for the public pleasure park, which was being suitably equipped by popular subscription, had been selected. The pleasure park was a slice of the old "Carmelita" place and the adopted name was Carmelita Garden. Carmelita Gardens had been bought for about US$50,000, of which half was paid and the other half covered by a mortgage, held by the S. G. Reed estate of Portland, Oregon former owners of the property. The promoters of the plan for a public pleasure park hailed from Pasadena, and decided to incorporate. The new corporation would have capital stock In the sum of US$250,000 and the stock would be issued in US$10 amounts, making the move for a suitable casino building a popular one. It was then sometimes referred to as Carmelita Park.

Around 1923, Carmelita Gardens was purchased by a group of civic-spirited people and presented to Pasadena with the thought that someday in the future, it would be developed into an art institute. The first step in this plan was taken in 1925 with the organization of the Pasadena Art Institute, which had in its membership many of those who contributed to the purchase of the gardens. Plans for the future provided a structure on the site where the Amanda Reed House was located. The building would house some of the most valuable works that were obtainable. All manner of art exhibits would be held at Carmelita Gardens and there would be lectures.

In 1932, it was announced that the Pasadena Art Institute, having secured the title to Carmelita Gardens, was ready to develop it into a school and art museum.

A proposal for a 9-hole golf course at Carmelita Park was made in 1950.

== Norton Simon Museum ==
The home and park were leveled in 1968. The property became the grounds of the Norton Simon Museum, the museum's sculpture garden retaining the spirit of Carr's original gardens.
