= Jeanne C. Smith Carr =

American correspondent, educator, landscape designer and botanist

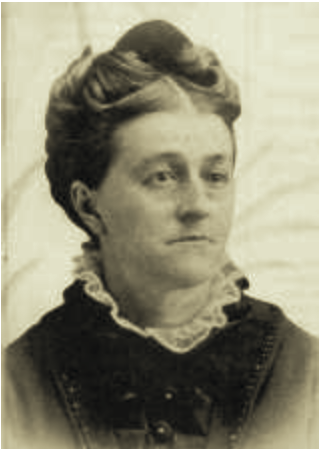
- Born: Jeanne Caroline Smith; 1825; Castleton, Vermont, U.S.
- Died: December 14, 1903 (aged 77–78); Templeton, California, U.S.
- Burial place: Oakland, California, U.S.
- Occupations: educator; letter writer; newspaper correspondent
- Known for: "Carmelita"
- Notable work: Kindred & Related Spirits, the Letters of John Muir and Jeanne C. Carr
- Spouse: Ezra S. Carr (m. 1844; died 1894)

Jeanne Caroline Smith Carr (1825–1903) was a prolific American newspaper correspondent and an educator who served as Deputy California State Superintendent of Public Instruction. An expert in botany and horticulture, Carr is chiefly remembered as a mentor of John Muir, with whom she had a public and platonic, yet warm and intimate relationship, their correspondence spanning 30 years.

At her home, "Carmelita", in Pasadena, California, Helen Hunt Jackson is said to have written many pages of her masterpiece, Ramona. Carr was a good friend of Helena Modjeska; and among well-known people who partook of Carr's hospitality were Charles Dudley Warner, Bret Harte, Ole Bull, and Paul Du Chaillu.

== Early life and education ==
Jeanne Caroline Smith was born in Castleton, Vermont, 1825. She was the eldest child of Dr. Albert Gallatin and Caroline Carver Smith.

She was educated at Castleton Seminary (now Castleton University). It was here that she met Prof. Ezra S. Carr.

== Career ==
In 1844, Jeanne and Ezra eloped, and she moved to Albany, New York, her husband holding the professorship of chemistry and pharmacy in the Albany Medical College. The couple had four sons.

In 1855, Ezra and Jeanne moved to Wisconsin, the former being tendered a professorship at the University of Wisconsin–Madison.

In 1866, they moved to California. Ezra served as the first elected California State Superintendent of Public Instruction, (Sacramento), and Jeanne was his assistant, serving with the title, Deputy California State Superintendent of Public Instruction.

Personal tragedy struck the Carrs during this time period (one son died in a railroad accident, and another of a gunshot — some said murder, others said suicide), and Ezra's health declined. As a result, he retired from active life, and in 1880, they moved into the newly formed Indiana Colony, the forerunner of Pasadena, California. Jeanne served as the Principal of the Indiana Colony's Central School in 1880–81.

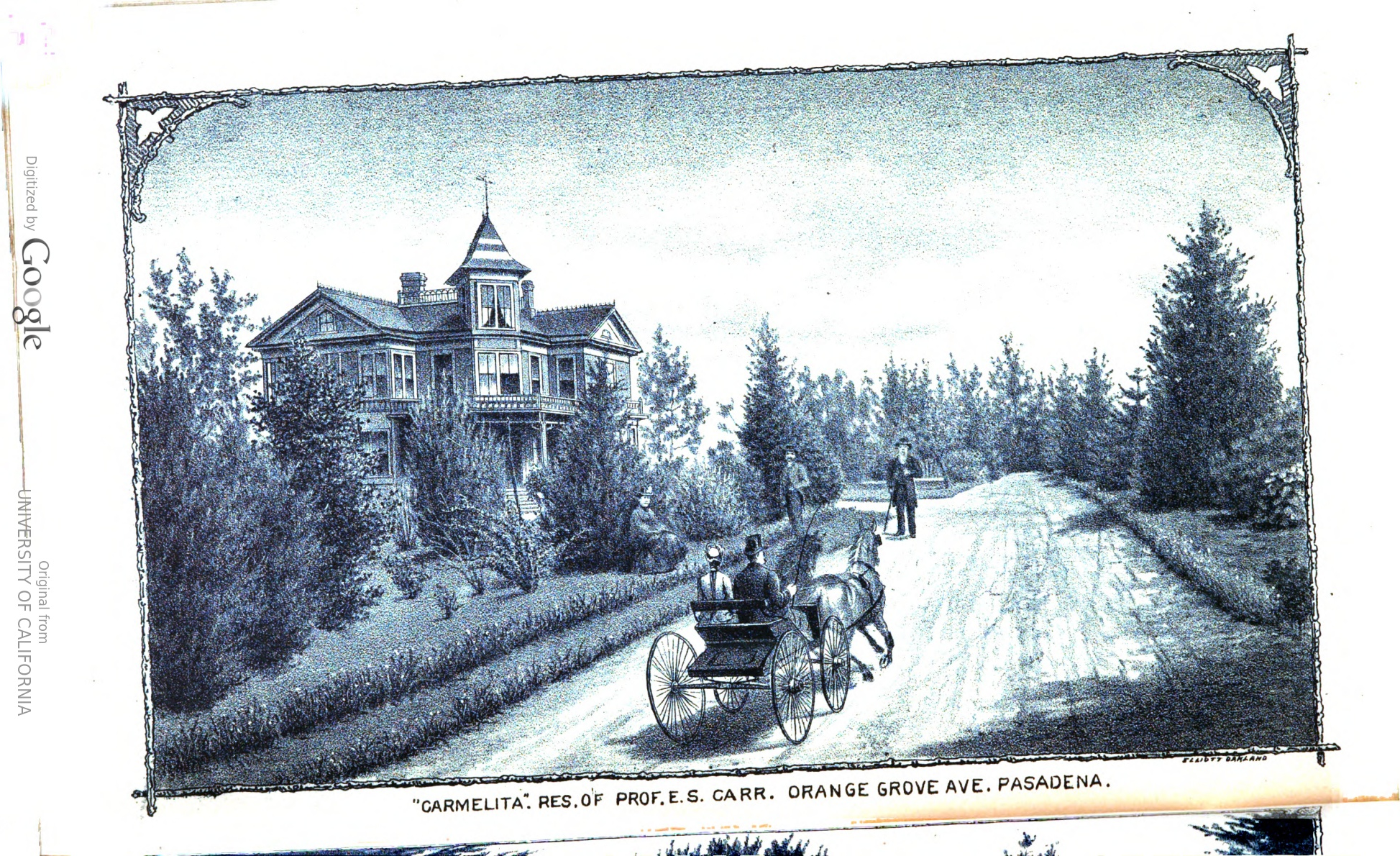
"Carmelita", 1886

Her home, "Carmelita", became an intellectual center in Southern California. Here, they laid out their property, a tract of 42 acres (17 ha), located on the northeast corner of Colorado Street and Orange Grove Avenue. In the course of years, it became noted for its over 200 fruit and ornamental trees and plants as well as the personalities of its owners. In a log cabin on these grounds, it is said that Helen Hunt Jackson, while visiting the Carrs, wrote part of Ramona.

Carr was interested in early California history and wrote extensively on the subject, including California missions. She was known as a special correspondent of the Sacramento Union and the writer of the Southern California articles in Dewing Publishing Company's Picturesque California, She wrote constantly for the general press, devoting herself almost exclusively to subjects concerning the promotion of the material growth of California. Her articles appeared in California Horticulturist, California Teacher, Home Journal, Illustrated Press, Los Angeles Daily Times, Pacific Rural Press, Pasadena and Valley Union, Western Farmer, Wisconsin Farmer, and Wisconsin State Journal.

She was considered an authority on the plant life of California, and had made a special study of horticulture, also of the possibilities of sericulture, which had been attracting some public attention at that time. She had planted many mulberry trees on her "Carmelita" ranch to grow the silkworm and conduct some experiments. In 1885, Carr served as the Third Vice-president of the State Board of Silk Culture. In 1892, Carr was again offered a position on the State Board of Silk Culture and accepted the appointment.

In 1890, when the Pacific Coast Women's Press Association was established, she was elected First Vice-President. In the same year, she served on the first board of directors of the Pasadena Library and Village Improvement Society. Previously, in 1885, when a Citrus Fair was held in Pasadena, one of its objects being to raise funds to assist the public library enterprise, Carr contributed much toward its success.

== Relationship with John Muir ==
The Wisconsin State Fair was held in Madison when the Carr family lived there. One exhibitor was a young man named John Muir who in his spare time on the family farm in Marquette County whittled a series of very clever clocks and similar devices. These caught the attention of Jeanne who saw in Muir intellectual gifts that she felt should be nurtured. She sought out Muir and through a series of circumstances, encouraged him to apply to become a student at the university. Among his instructors were Ezra Carr, as well as another professor he was to stay in contact with for most of his life, James Davie Butler. The Carrs and the Butlers were personal as well as professional mentors. Some life events were also influenced in reverse; when Muir went to California, he was in active contact with Jeanne, and when the Carrs were deciding on locations for their next move, Muir strongly endorsed California.

Jeanne was gregarious and gifted and the Carrs had a vast network of influential friends in the east. When they moved to California they picked right up cultivating important relationships. In the summer of 1869, Jeanne went to Yosemite for her first visit, hoping to meet Muir in person. However, Muir was high in the Sierra that summer tending sheep. Jeanne stayed at James Hutchings' hotel, where Jeanne and Hutchings' wife Elvira established a friendship that would last many years. When Jeanne discovered that Hutchings needed a millwright to run a sawmill (for lumber to build up tourist facilities), she connected Hutchings to Muir. (Muir, aside from his general mechanical aptitude, had specific experience as a millwright in Indiana.) While Muir worked for Hutchings over the next few years, Jeanne frequently suggested to friends that they seek out Muir as a personal guide/naturalist. Among those who took up this suggestion were Ralph Waldo Emerson and scientist Asa Gray.

The relationship between Jeanne and Muir was public and platonic, yet warm and intimate. What the Carrs did to enhance Muir's career was broad and general, nurturing his contact with the elite classes of society in the late 19th-century United States. An important specific influence was when Jeanne introduced Muir to the woman he would marry, Louisa "Louie" Strentzel. Louie Strentzel's father was a medical doctor from Poland, who moved to California during the gold rush. He practiced medicine only a little in California, but he did build up a valuable ranch in Martinez. The Carrs knew Strentzel because he was very active in the Grange movement. Jeanne thought that Louie and John would be a good match, which led to their marriage. When Strentzel died, Louie and John inherited the estate. Income from the ranch was key in allowing Muir free rein to promote his particular wilderness philosophies, which resonated strongly among the wealthier classes of society (who were after all the only ones who could afford the expense of wilderness adventures in that era). When Louie died, Muir inherited a good part of the ranch for himself (some of the inheritance going to their daughters), which accounts for the fact that contrary to popular perceptions that he was a dreamy vagabond, when he died he was worth the 21st-century equivalent of US$4,000,000. Almost every aspect of Muir's success, financial and otherwise, was in some part due to his relationship with the Carrs.

== Later life ==
Ezra died in Pasadena on November 27, 1894.

After selling "Carmelita", Carr built a small mission-style dwelling on Pasadena's Kensington Street and tiled the roof with mission tiles made by the Indigenous people of California during Padre Zalvidea's administration at Mission San Gabriel Arcángel. Her doorstep was formed by one-half of the first grindstone used in the old mill on the Mayberry ranch.

In March 1897, she was adjudged incompetent and had a guardian appointed.

== Death and legacy ==
Jeanne C. Smith Carr died at the home of her brother-in-law in Templeton, California, on December 14, 1903. The burial was in Oakland, California.

The Jeanne C. Smith Carr Papers are held by the Huntington Library.

== Selected works ==
=== Articles ===
- "The Genesis of Crime", Souvenir Nineteenth Annual Congress, by Association for the Advancement of Women (Washington, D.C. : Todd Brothers, 1877)
- "Pasadena - The Crown of the Valley", Annual Publication of the Historical Society of Southern California, Volume 3 (1893) (text)

=== Book chapters ===
- "Trees, shrubs, and wild flowers of South California", in California of the south; its physical geography, climate, resources, routes of travel, and health-resorts -- a complete guide-book to South California, by Lindley, Walter & Widney, J.P. (New York, Appleton, 1888)
