= Raymond–Summit Historic District =

Historic district in California, United States

- U.S. National Register of Historic Places
- U.S. Historic district
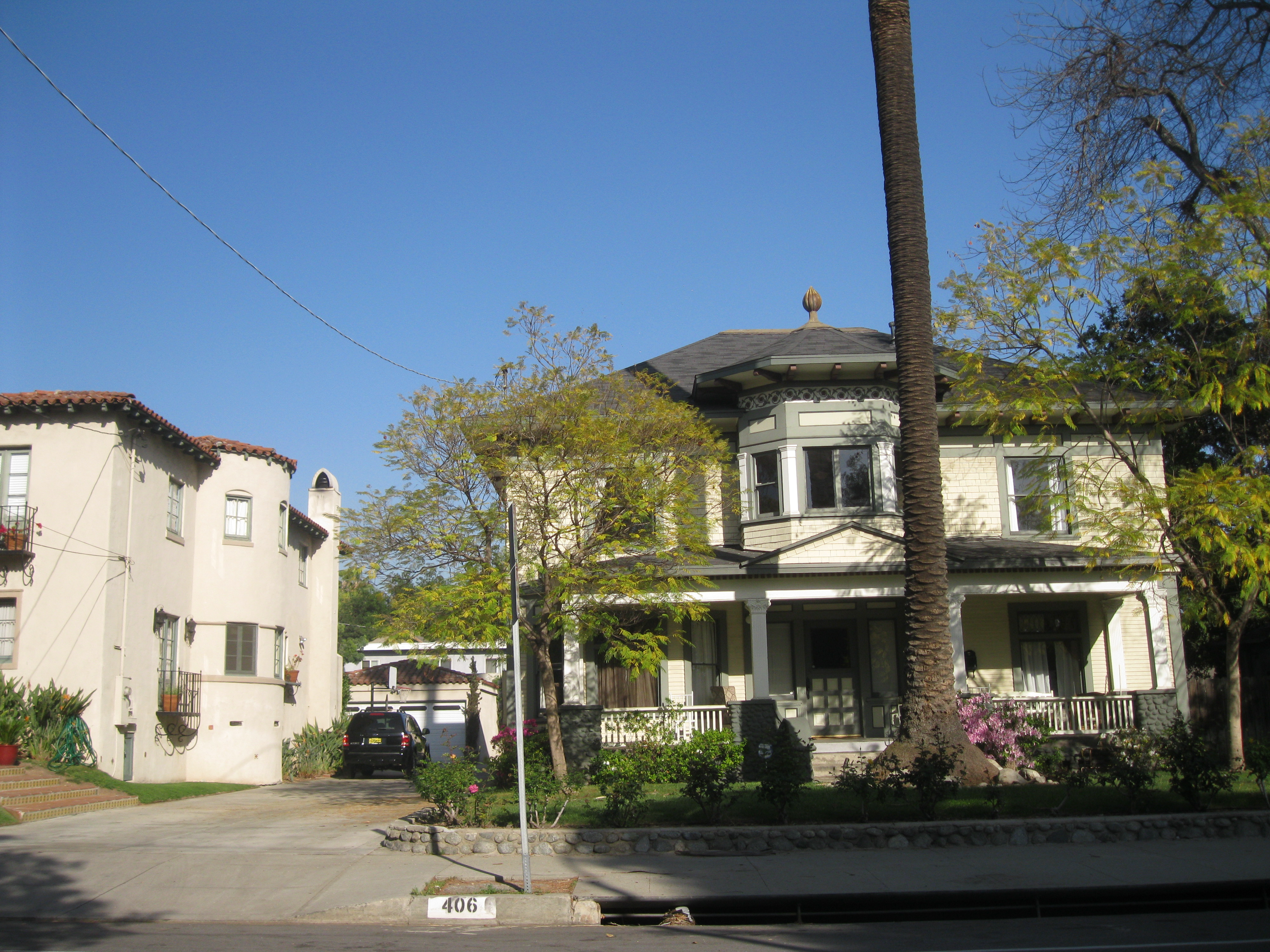
- 414 (left) and 406 (right) North Raymond Avenue

- Location within the Los Angeles metropolitan area Location within California Location within the United States
- Location: Roughly bounded by N. Raymond Ave., E. Villa St., Summit Ave. & E. Maple St., Pasadena, California
- Coordinates: 34°9′12″N 118°8′54″W
- Area: 4.6 acres (1.9 ha)
- NRHP reference No.: 11000500
- Added to NRHP: August 9, 2011

The Raymond–Summit Historic District is a historic district roughly encompassing the 400 blocks of North Raymond and North Summit Avenues in Pasadena, California. The residential historic district includes 22 contributing buildings. The area was part of Rancho San Pascual prior to its development. In 1875, the Lake Vineyard Land and Water Company formed to manage the property. The company parceled out and sold the land and, between 1886 and 1904, the new owners built houses on their properties during a Pasadena building boom. Architectural styles represented among these homes include Queen Anne, Colonial Revival, American Foursquare, American Craftsman, Shingle Style, and a number of vernacular styles. Prominent Pasadena architects Greene & Greene designed a Shingle Style house at 450 North Raymond and two vernacular cottages at 442 and 448 North Summit; all three houses have Colonial Revival details.

The district was added to the National Register of Historic Places on August 9, 2011.

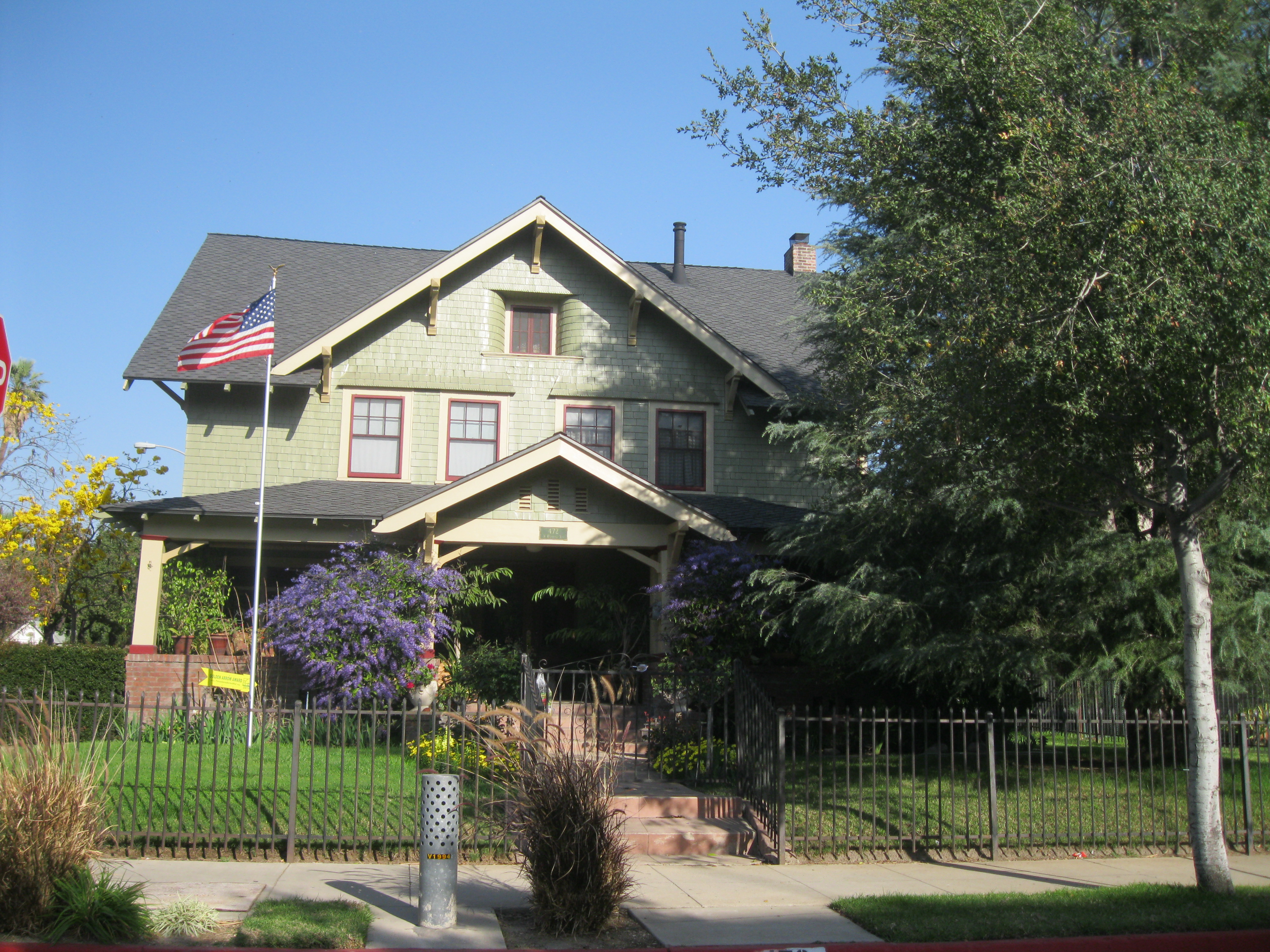
A Craftsman house at 472 North Raymond
