= Reedville Creek Park =

Park in Hillsboro, Oregon, United States

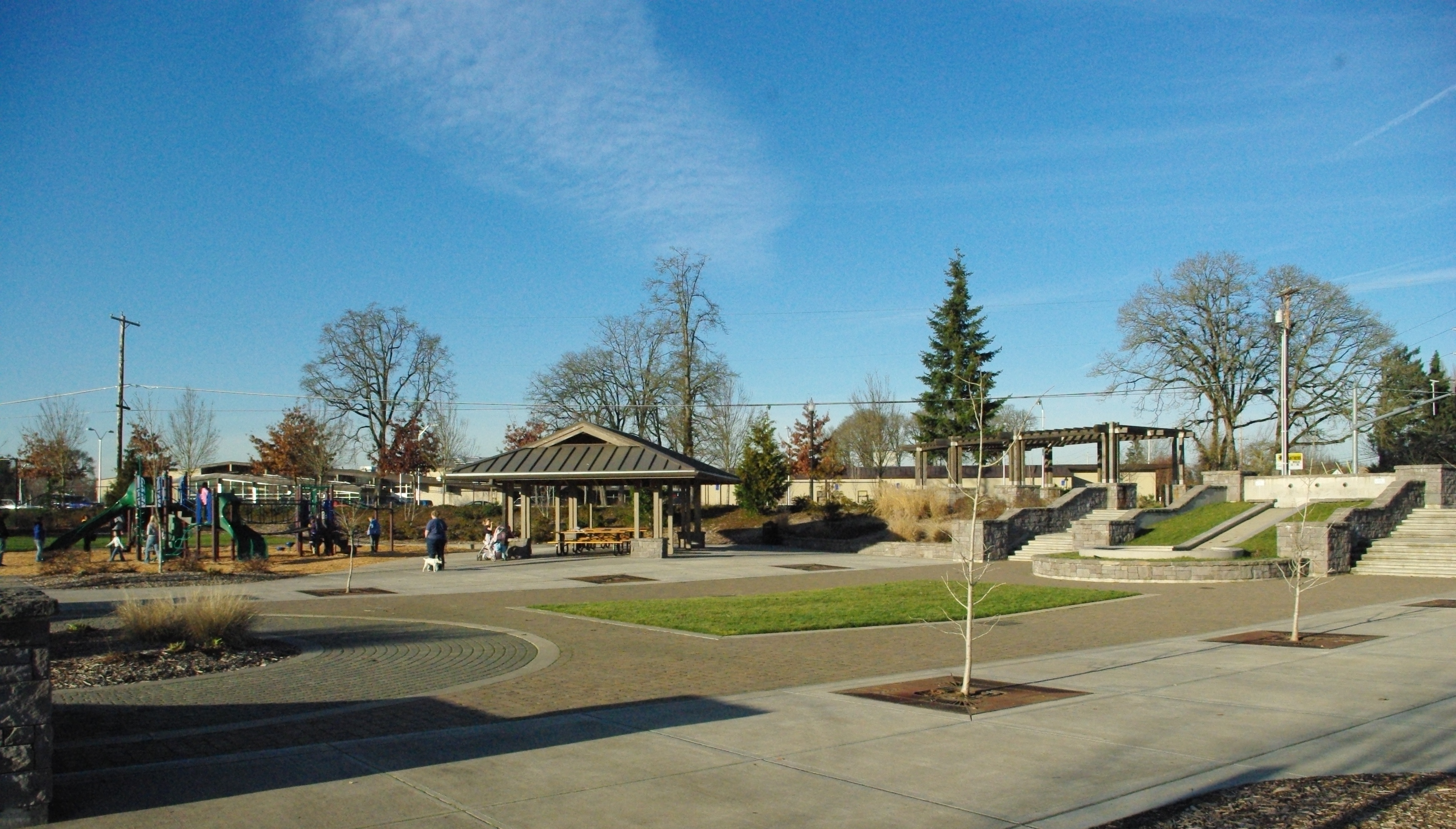
- Plaza area of the park with playground equipment and picnic shelter
- Interactive map of Reedville Creek Park
- Type: Public, city
- Location: Hillsboro, Oregon; United States
- Coordinates: 45°30′31″N 122°54′14″W
- Area: 9.6 acres (39,000 m^{2})
- Created: 2003
- Operator: Hillsboro Parks & Recreation Department
- Status: open
- Parking: 40 spaces
- Website: Reedville Creek Park

Reedville Creek Park is a municipal park in the Reedville neighborhood of Hillsboro, Oregon, United States. Opened in 2003, the 9.6-acre (39,000 m^{2}) park is along Cornelius Pass Road at Francis Street in the southeast area of the city. The park includes basketball courts, children’s play equipment, a picnic shelter, tennis courts, and sports fields among other amenities. Reedville Creek was the first and is the only park in Hillsboro with a skatepark.

== History ==
In 1999, Hillsboro bought a 9.6-acre (39,000 m^{2}) parcel for park to be built at Cornelius Pass Road and Francis Street. The land, which abuts Reedville Creek, was a filbert orchard when the city made the purchase. That same year the city announced plans to build a city owned skatepark at a then undetermined location. In 2001, the parks department finalized plans for the park, which included parking, basketball courts, sports fields, tennis courts, play equipment, and the skatepark.

In March of the following year the city solicited input from residents on the design of what was then planned to be a 15,000-square-foot (1,400 m^{2}) skatepark. At that time the name of Reedville Creek Park had been adopted. Prior to committing to a skateboard facility, the city waited to build one to ensure skateboarding and inline skating were not merely fads. Early plans estimated the cost of the structure to total approximately $100,000 for the outdoor skatepark that was to be designed to accommodate beginner and intermediate levels of ability.

During the skatepark design process, the city received over 100 suggestions from residents, primarily from teenagers. The process resulted in plans for a skatepark that featured primarily street elements such as steps and rails that skateboarders would normally find in urban settings. Mike McIntyre and his SITE Design Group were hired by the city to design the skatepark, which had then grown to a 18,000-square-foot (1,700 m^{2}) plan and a cost of $200,000 to $300,000. The city put the construction out for bid on the entire park in May 2002, with estimates for the total cost of the park reaching as high as $1.5 million.

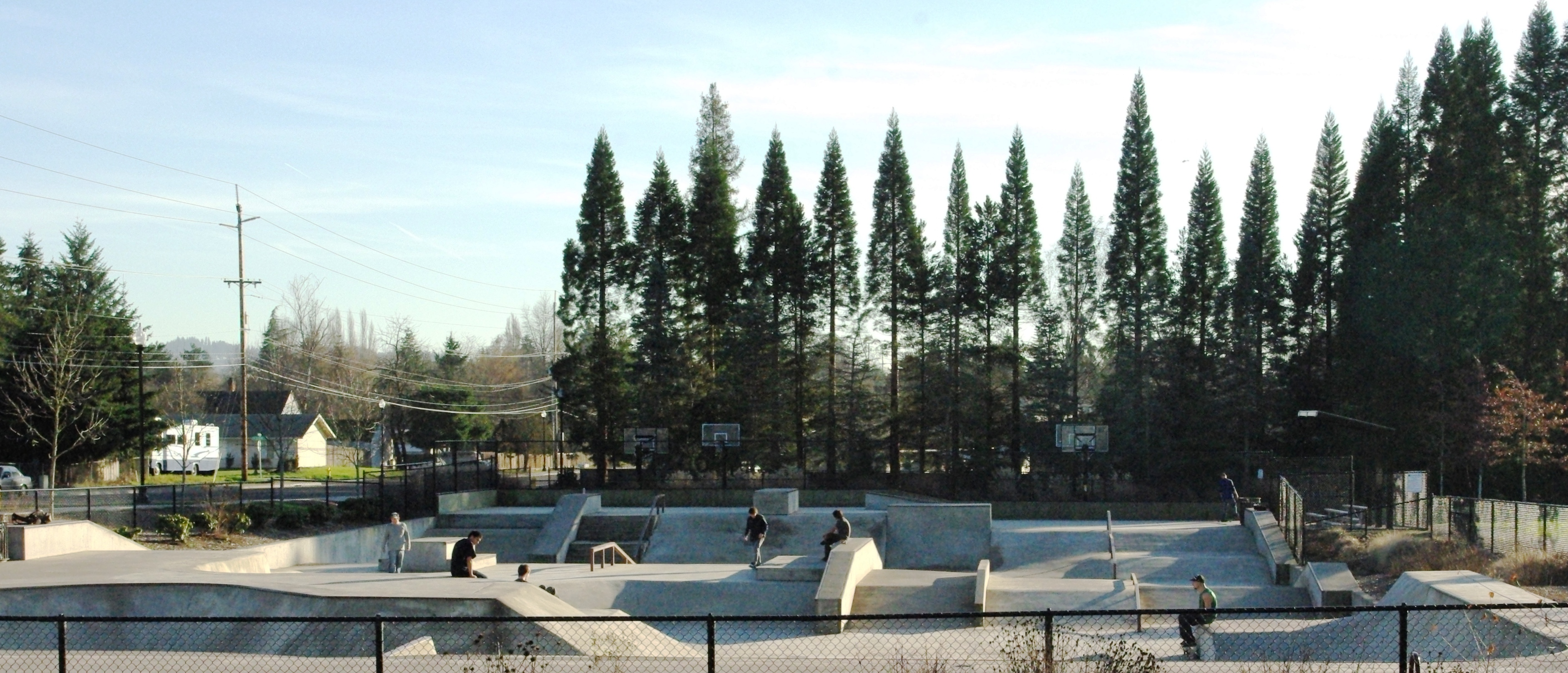
Skatepark at the park

The city hired Corp Inc. for $1.54 million to build Reedville Creek Park in June 2002, with construction beginning that month. Hillsboro estimated the park would be completed by the end of the year. By mid-November the concrete ramps at the park had been installed. In February 2003, the park and skatepark opened. Funds to pay for the park were collected from the city’s development charges.

The opening of the park attracted skateboarders from around the Portland metropolitan area. The skatepark was the first one in a Hillsboro park. That summer the city built a fence between the basketball courts and the skatepark. Since opening the park has hosted events such as a safety fair in 2004, annual skateboarding camps, a tennis camp held by the National Junior Tennis League in 2007, and a park clean-up event organized by SOLV that included removal of non-native species from Reedville Creek held in May 2008.

When the skatepark at Reedville Creek opened, only skateboarders were allowed to use the skatepark. In June 2010, the city started a 90-day trial period where people riding bicycles and scooters would be allowed to use the skatepark as well. Hillsboro made the change permanent in October of that year.

== Amenities ==
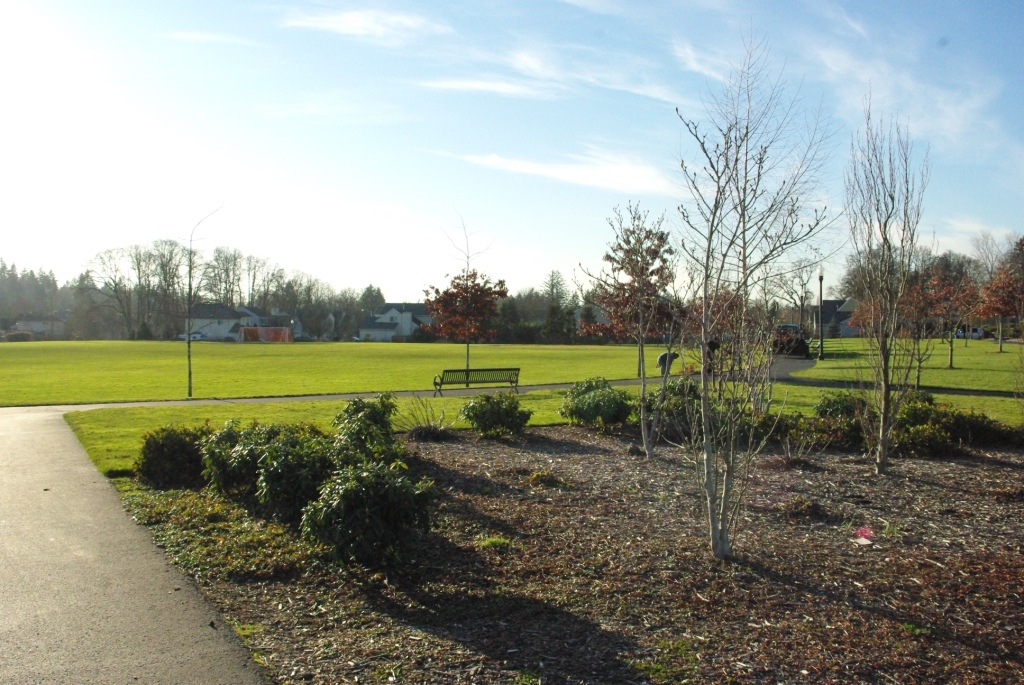
Athletic fields and landscaping

Reedville Creek Park features areas for a variety of sports related activities as well as traditional park amenities. The park has two basketball courts, two tennis courts, a softball field, and a soccer field. There is also a 19,000-square-foot (1,800 m^{2}) skatepark along the eastern edge of the park built of concrete which is also lighted. Other facilities include a picnic shelter, children’s playground equipment, paths, and public restrooms. The park has a parking lot that can hold up to 40 cars. There is also a memorial at the park to Paul Grillo who was killed by his brother while the two were in college at the University of Oregon.
