= Governor Stoneman Adobe, Los Robles =

California historic landmark

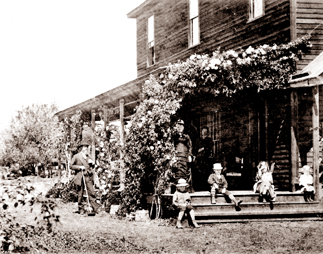
- Governor Stoneman Adobe, Los Robles

- Location within the Los Angeles metropolitan area
- 34°06′51″N 118°08′10″W
- Location: 1912 Montrobles Place, San Marino CA

History
- Built: 1876

California Historical Landmark
- Designated: Dec.01, 1958
- Reference no.: 669

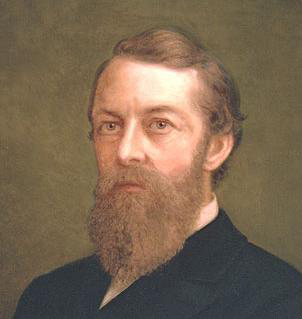
Official portrait of Governor George Stoneman

Governor Stoneman Adobe, Los Robles was the home of George Stoneman, the 15th governor of California, from January 10, 1883, to January 8, 1887. The home was built in 1876 on his 400-acre estate, that was on the former Rancho San Pascual, present-day San Marino, California. The location was designated a California Historic Landmark (No. 669) on December 1, 1958. Nothing remains of the home as it was destroyed in a fire, which was rumored to have been started by one of his political enemies. George Stoneman was a general in the Union Army in the American Civil War, who led the last cavalry raid of the war. After the war, Stoneman moved to California, the place of which he had dreamed since his service as a young officer before the war. He and his wife settled in the San Gabriel Valley on a 400-acre (160 ha) estate called Los Robles. He was appointed as a state railroad commissioner, serving from 1876 to 1878. In 1882, Stoneman was elected governor of California as a Democrat and served a single four-year term. He was not renominated by his party for a second term. After his house burned down, he was broken financially by the disaster and was in poor health. He returned to New York State for medical treatment. He died following a stroke in Buffalo, New York, on September 5, 1894, at age 72. He is buried in the Bentley Cemetery in Lakewood, New York.

== Marker ==
Marker at 912 Montrobles Place, San Marino, California reads:

- NO. 669 GOVERNOR STONEMAN ADOBE, LOS ROBLES – This was the site of 'Los Robles,' the 400-acre estate of Governor George Stoneman. President Rutherford B. Hayes was entertained here in 1880. The first schoolhouse in the San Gabriel Valley, California's first tennis club, and the first municipal Christmas tree of San Marino were located here.

== See also ==
- California Historical Landmarks in Los Angeles County
- List of California Ranchos
- Ranchos of Los Angeles County, California
