= San Pasqual, Los Angeles County, California =

San Pasqual, California
- Unincorporated community Census designated place
- Location in Los Angeles County, California

- Location within the State of California San Pasqual, California (the United States)
- Coordinates: 34°8′21″N 118°6′9″W
- Country: United States
- State: California
- County: Los Angeles

Area
  - Total: 0.255 sq mi (0.660 km^{2})
  - Land: 0.255 sq mi (0.660 km^{2})
  - Water: 0 sq mi (0 km^{2}) 0%
- Elevation: 696 ft (212 m)

Population (2020)
  - Total: 2,101
  - Density: 8,240/sq mi (3,180/km^{2})
- Time zone: UTC-8 (Pacific (PST))
  - Summer (DST): UTC-7 (PDT)
- ZIP codes: 91107
- GNIS feature IDs: 248942; 2629291

San Pasqual is an unincorporated community and census-designated place (CDP) in the San Gabriel Valley of Los Angeles County, California, United States. It lies between San Marino and Pasadena. The major streets in San Pasqual are San Pasqual Street, South Sierra Madre Blvd., and Oakdale Street. San Pasqual is served by the Pasadena post office responsible for ZIP code 91107, thus locations there are properly addressed with the final line reading "Pasadena, CA 91107". The population was 2,101 at the 2020 census.

The name comes from the Rancho San Pascual, of which San Pasqual is one of the remaining unincorporated areas.

== Geography ==
According to the United States Census Bureau, the CDP has a total area of 0.3 square mile (0.7 km^{2}), all land.

== Demographics ==
Historical population
Census	Pop.	Note	%±
2010	2,041		—
2020	2,101		2.9%
U.S. Decennial Census; 2000 2010; 2020

San Pasqual first appeared as a census designated place in the 2010 U.S. census.

San Pasqual CDP, California – Racial and ethnic composition Note: the US Census treats Hispanic/Latino as an ethnic category. This table excludes Latinos from the racial categories and assigns them to a separate category. Hispanics/Latinos may be of any race.
Race / Ethnicity (NH = Non-Hispanic)	Pop 2010	Pop 2020	% 2010	% 2020
White alone (NH)	1,114	987	54.58%	46.98%
Black or African American alone (NH)	57	66	2.79%	3.14%
Native American or Alaska Native alone (NH)	1	1	0.05%	0.05%
Asian alone (NH)	436	499	21.36%	23.75%
Native Hawaiian or Pacific Islander alone (NH)	1	0	0.05%	0.00%
Other race alone (NH)	4	14	0.20%	0.67%
Mixed race or Multiracial (NH)	66	105	3.23%	5.00%
Hispanic or Latino (any race)	362	429	17.74%	20.42%
Total	2,041	2,101	100.00%	100.00%

=== 2020 ===
The 2020 United States census reported that San Pasqual had a population of 2,101. The population density was 8,239.2 inhabitants per square mile (3,181.2/km^{2}). The racial makeup was 51.8% White, 3.5% African American, 0.4% Native American, 24.0% Asian, 0.0% Pacific Islander, 6.6% from other races, and 13.7% from two or more races. Hispanic or Latino of any race were 20.4% of the population.

The whole population lived in households. There were 929 households, out of which 26.2% included children under the age of 18, 46.7% were married-couple households, 4.5% were cohabiting couple households, 29.0% had a female householder with no partner present, and 19.8% had a male householder with no partner present. 31.2% of households were one person, and 12.7% were one person aged 65 or older. The average household size was 2.26. There were 571 families (61.5% of all households).

The age distribution was 19.3% under the age of 18, 6.7% aged 18 to 24, 26.0% aged 25 to 44, 28.1% aged 45 to 64, and 19.9% who were 65 years of age or older. The median age was 43.6 years. For every 100 females, there were 91.7 males.

There were 977 housing units at an average density of 3,831.4 units per square mile (1,479.3 units/km^{2}), of which 929 (95.1%) were occupied. Of these, 54.9% were owner-occupied, and 45.1% were occupied by renters.

In 2023, the US Census Bureau estimated that the median household income was $138,542, and the per capita income was $88,727. About 6.5% of families and 6.6% of the population were below the poverty line.

=== 2010 ===
At the 2010 census San Pasqual had a population of 2,041. The population density was 8,001.1 inhabitants per square mile (3,089.2/km^{2}). The racial makeup of San Pasqual was 1,344 (65.9%) White (54.6% Non-Hispanic White), 63 (3.1%) African American, 7 (0.3%) Native American, 438 (21.5%) Asian, 1 (0.0%) Pacific Islander, 104 (5.1%) from other races, and 84 (4.1%) from two or more races. Hispanic or Latino of any race were 362 people (17.7%).

The whole population lived in households, no one lived in non-institutionalized group quarters and no one was institutionalized.

There were 909 households, 228 (25.1%) had children under the age of 18 living in them, 426 (46.9%) were opposite-sex married couples living together, 75 (8.3%) had a female householder with no husband present, 36 (4.0%) had a male householder with no wife present. There were 42 (4.6%) unmarried opposite-sex partnerships, and 13 (1.4%) same-sex married couples or partnerships. 301 households (33.1%) were one person and 83 (9.1%) had someone living alone who was 65 or older. The average household size was 2.25. There were 537 families (59.1% of households); the average family size was 2.89.

The age distribution was 365 people (17.9%) under the age of 18, 120 people (5.9%) aged 18 to 24, 656 people (32.1%) aged 25 to 44, 617 people (30.2%) aged 45 to 64, and 283 people (13.9%) who were 65 or older. The median age was 41.3 years. For every 100 females, there were 91.8 males. For every 100 females age 18 and over, there were 90.5 males.

There were 961 housing units at an average density of 3,767.3 per square mile, of the occupied units 533 (58.6%) were owner-occupied and 376 (41.4%) were rented. The homeowner vacancy rate was 0.7%; the rental vacancy rate was 7.6%. 1,290 people (63.2% of the population) lived in owner-occupied housing units and 751 people (36.8%) lived in rental housing units.

According to the 2010 United States Census, San Pasqual had a median household income of $96,938, with 2.5% of the population living below the federal poverty line.
