= Reedville, Oregon =

Unincorporated community in the state of Oregon, United States

- Neighborhood
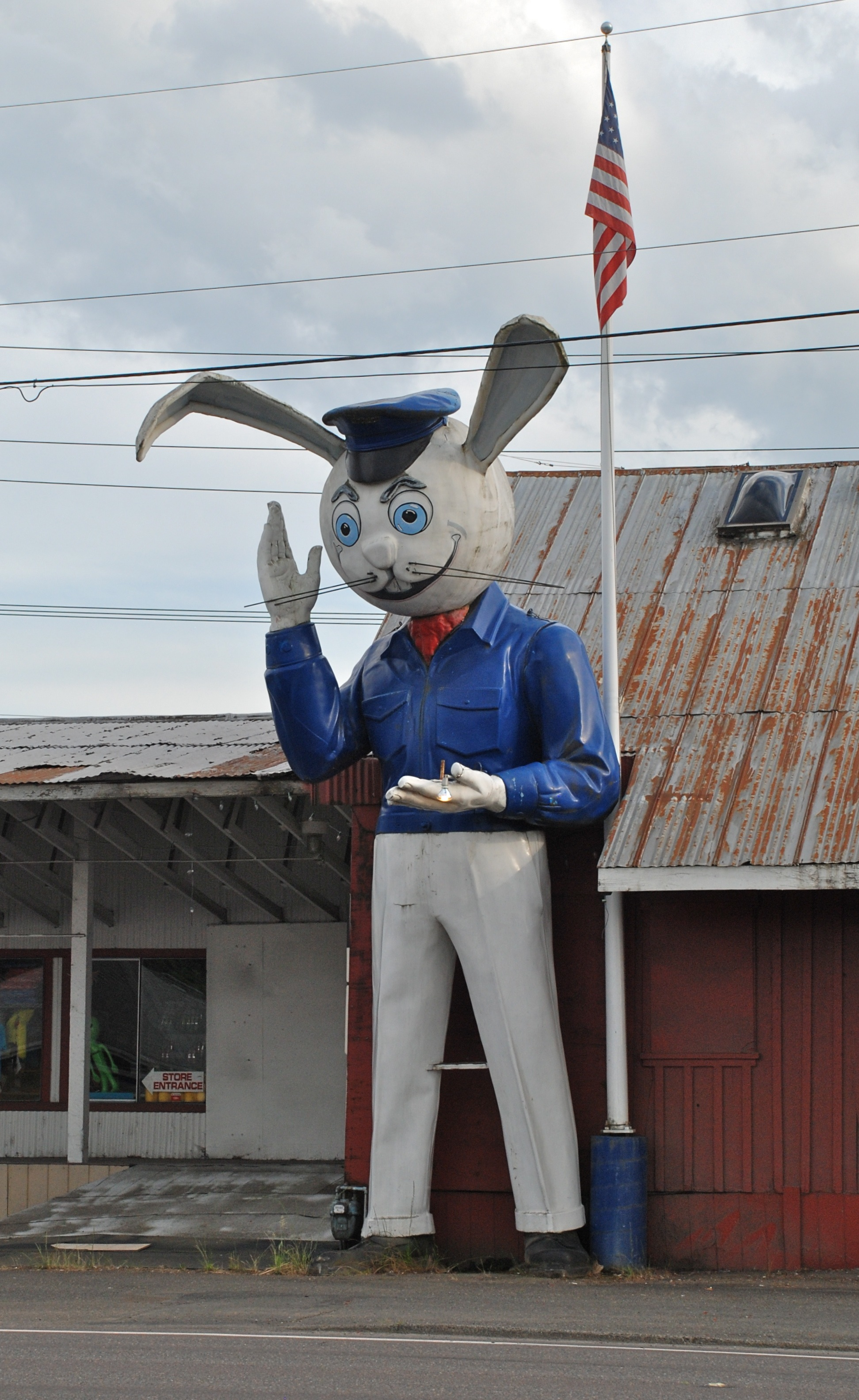
- Harvey Rabbit on TV Highway

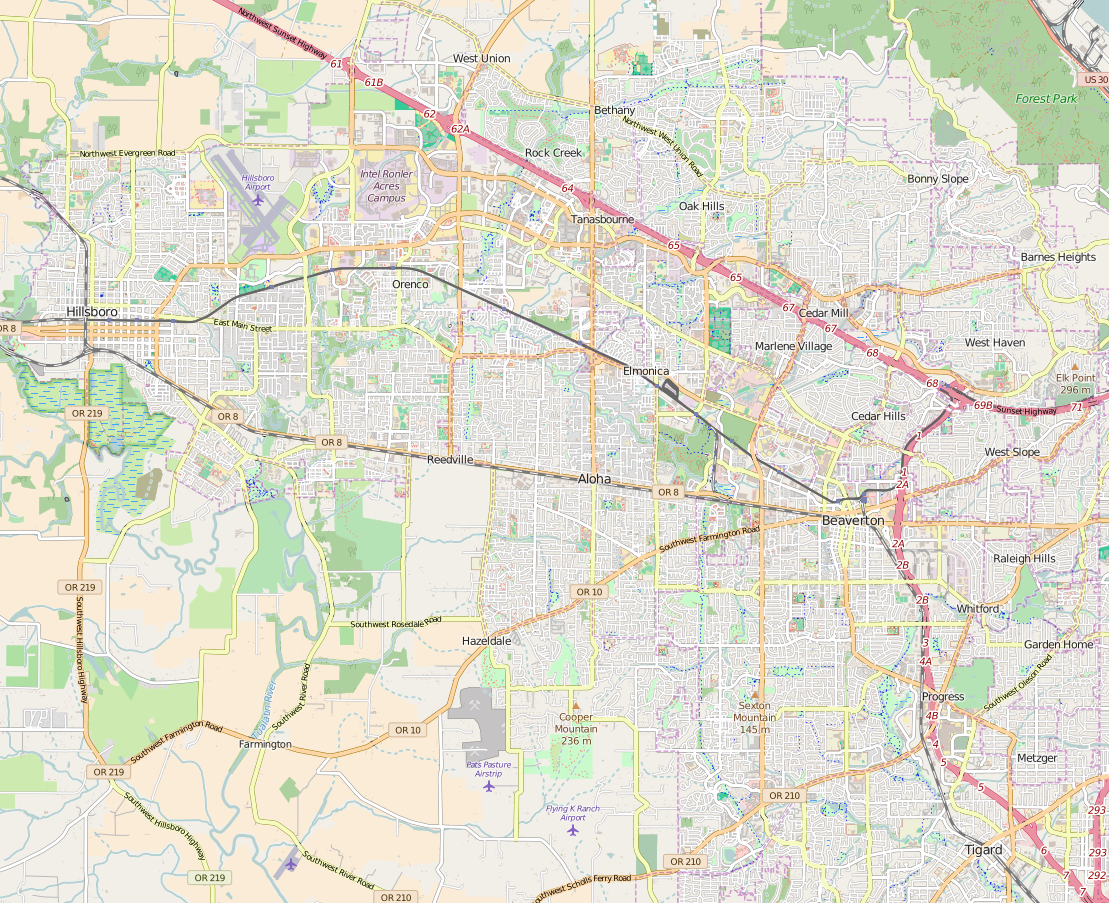
- Location within the Hillsboro area Reedville, Oregon (Oregon) Reedville, Oregon (the United States)
- Coordinates: 45°29′52″N 122°54′4″W
- Country: United States
- State: Oregon
- County: Washington County
- City: Hillsboro
- Time zone: UTC-8 (PST)
  - Summer (DST): UTC-7 (PDT)
- ZIP code: 97003, 97078, and 97123
- Area codes: 503 and 971

Reedville is an unincorporated community in Washington County, Oregon, United States, located between Hillsboro and Aloha. Oregon Route 8 (also known as the Tualatin Valley Highway) runs through the area. The community is served by the Hillsboro School District, with some portions of the area within the city limits of Hillsboro.

== History ==
Reedville was named for Simeon Gannett Reed, who was a member of the Oregon Steam Navigation Company, and a prominent figure in Columbia River transportation in 1859-1879. Reed and business partner William S. Ladd operated an 8,000-acre (32 km^{2}) plus hobby farm in the area where they raised livestock and held harness races. His property became the endowment of Reed College after the death of his wife Amanda Reed. Reedville post office was established in 1877 and ran until 1954.

In 2003, Hillsboro opened the Reedville Creek Park, which included the city’s first skate park. By 2004, parts of the community had been annexed into Hillsboro, which led to readdressing of several streets from the county based street numbering to the Hillsboro-based numbering system.

In 2016, ground broke on a new subdivision called Reed's Crossing in South Hillsboro. It is located just south of the intersection of Oregon Route 8 and Cornelius Pass Road. A commercial center called Reed's Crossing Town Center and a 23 acre Reed's Crossing Greenway park are expected to be in the new subdivision.

== Sites of interest ==
- Harvey the Rabbit on Tualatin Valley Highway. This roadside attraction was named for the rabbit in the film Harvey.
- Reedville Creek Park on Cornelius Pass Road that includes Hillsboro's only skatepark as well as basketball courts, play equipment, and paths.
