= Ezra S. Carr =

American physician

Ezra Slocum Carr
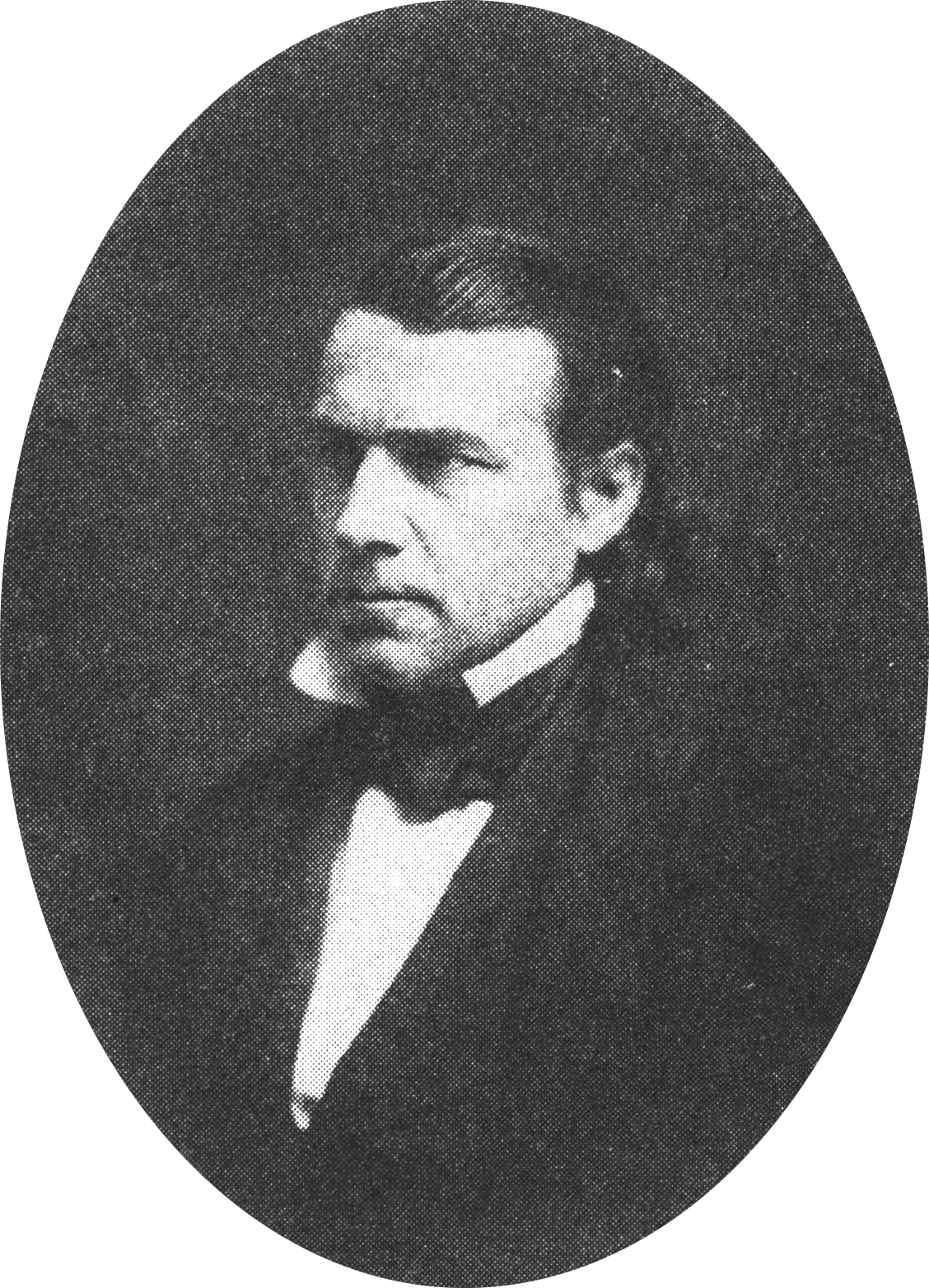
- Born: March 9, 1819; Stephentown, New York
- Died: November 27, 1894 (aged 75); Pasadena, California
- Occupations: Professor of natural sciences and agriculture
- Known for: Progressive educator, friend and mentor to John Muir
- Spouse: Jeanne Caroline Smith (m. 1844)

Ezra Slocum Carr (March 9, 1819 – November 27, 1894) was a professor at the University of Wisconsin (where he was also briefly a member of the Board of Regents) and at the University of California - Berkeley. He was originally trained as a medical doctor but taught in several scientific fields. He was a one time California Superintendent of Public Instruction. Carr and his wife Jeanne were close friends of John Muir and were extremely influential in Muir's life at several key junctures.

== Life and career ==
Carr was born in Stephentown, New York, on March 9, 1819, the son of Peleg Slocum Carr and Deborah Goodrich Carr. He attended Rensselaer Polytechnic Institute and Castleton College (Vermont). He received an MD from the latter in 1842. For several years he taught at colleges in the east.

Carr received an appointment as professor to the University of Wisconsin in 1855 — his title was Chair of Natural Sciences, and he also was to teach a course in agricultural science. He was the eighth member of the faculty, and at the time this was considered by the regents to fill the needs. The university was new, and as a lobbying ploy to enhance legislative and public support, Carr and Daniel Read were inaugurated in a ceremony in the Assembly hall. Carr used the occasion to outline his educational philosophies, and throughout his time in Madison he continued to push for emphasis on practical relevancy of the coursework offered by the university. "[T]he public have a reasonable right to expect ... that these departments connect the University directly with the industrial interests of the State, by affording instruction to young men, in Agriculture, Mining, etc...." Like many academics at the university, he immediately became involved with the state historical society. He was also a member of the State Geological Survey and served as a university regent from 1857 to 1859. Outspoken and at times at odds with his colleagues, in 1867 Carr lost his faculty position during a general turnover due to reforms instituted by new university president Paul A. Chadbourne.

At first Carr and his wife Jeanne were unsure of their next career step, and made a trip back east to visit friends and family. They eventually decided to move to California, and although Carr did not have an offer to teach when they made the move, it was a fortuitous time since the new University of California was being formed, and Carr was eventually offered a professorship. He remained outspoken, and in time the stresses and strains led him to step down from teaching. He then moved on to a career in politics, and in 1875 he was elected California Superintendent of Public Instruction, assuming office on December 6. In his campaign he was endorsed by several of the populist organizations of the state. He was a Republican. Being a Past Master of the Temescal Grange, he also received important support from the Grangers. Carr was sometimes assisted in his work as Superintendent when he was ill by Jeanne, who officially held the title of Assistant Superintendent. Personal tragedy struck the Carrs during this time period (one son died in a railroad accident, and another of a gunshot — some said murder, others said suicide), and Ezra's health declined. As a result, he retired from active life and in 1880 moved into the newly formed Indiana Colony, the forerunner of Pasadena. Carr died in there on November 27, 1894.

== Relationship with John Muir ==
The Wisconsin State Fair was held in Madison during the days Ezra and Jeanne and their family were living there. One exhibitor was a young man named John Muir who in his spare time on the family farm in Marquette County whittled a series of very clever clocks and similar devices. These caught the attention of Jeanne who saw in Muir intellectual gifts that she felt should be nurtured. She sought out Muir and through a series of circumstances encouraged him to apply to become a student at the university. Among his instructors were Ezra Carr, as well as another professor he was to stay in contact for most of his life, James Davie Butler. The Carrs and the Butlers were personal as well as professional mentors. Some life events were also influenced in reverse; when Muir went to California, he was in active contact with Jeanne, and when the Carrs were deciding on locations for their next move, Muir strongly endorsed California.

Jeanne Carr was gregarious and gifted and the Carrs had a vast network of influential friends in the east. When they moved to California they picked right up cultivating important relationships. In the summer of 1869, Jeanne Carr went to Yosemite for her first visit, hoping to be able to meet Muir in person. However, Muir was high in the Sierra that summer tending sheep. Jeanne Carr stayed at James Hutchings' hotel, where Jeanne and Hutchings' wife Elvira struck up a friendship that was to last for many years. When Jeanne Carr found out that Hutchings needed a millwright to run a sawmill (for lumber to build up tourist facilities), she was able to connect Hutchings to Muir. (Muir, aside from his general mechanical aptitude, had specific experience as a millwright in Indiana.) While Muir was working for Hutchings over the next few years, Jeanne Carr frequently suggested to friends that they seek out Muir as a personal guide/naturalist. Among those who took up this suggestion were Ralph Waldo Emerson and scientist Asa Gray.

The relationship between Jeanne Carr and John Muir was public and platonic, yet warm and intimate. What the Carrs did to enhance Muir's career was broad and general, nurturing his contact with the elite classes of society in late nineteenth century United States. An important specific influence was when Jeanne Carr introduced Muir to the woman he would marry, Louisa "Louie" Strentzel. Louie Strentzel's father was a medical doctor from Poland, who moved to California during the gold rush. He practiced medicine only a little in California, but he did build up a valuable ranch in Martinez. The Carrs knew Strentzel because he was very active in the Grange movement. Jeanne thought that Louie and John would be a good match, which led to their marriage. When Strentzel died, Louie and John inherited the estate. Income from the ranch was key in allowing Muir free rein to promote his particular wilderness philosophies, which resonated strongly among the wealthier classes of society (who were after all the only ones who could afford the expense of wilderness adventures in that era). When Louie died, Muir inherited a good part of the ranch for himself (some of the inheritance going to their daughters), which accounts for the fact that contrary to popular perceptions that he was a dreamy vagabond, when he died he was worth the twenty-first century equivalent of $4 million. Almost every aspect of Muir's success, financial and otherwise, was in some part due his relationship to the Carrs.
