= Adobe Flores =

Historic house in South Pasadena, California

- U.S. National Register of Historic Places
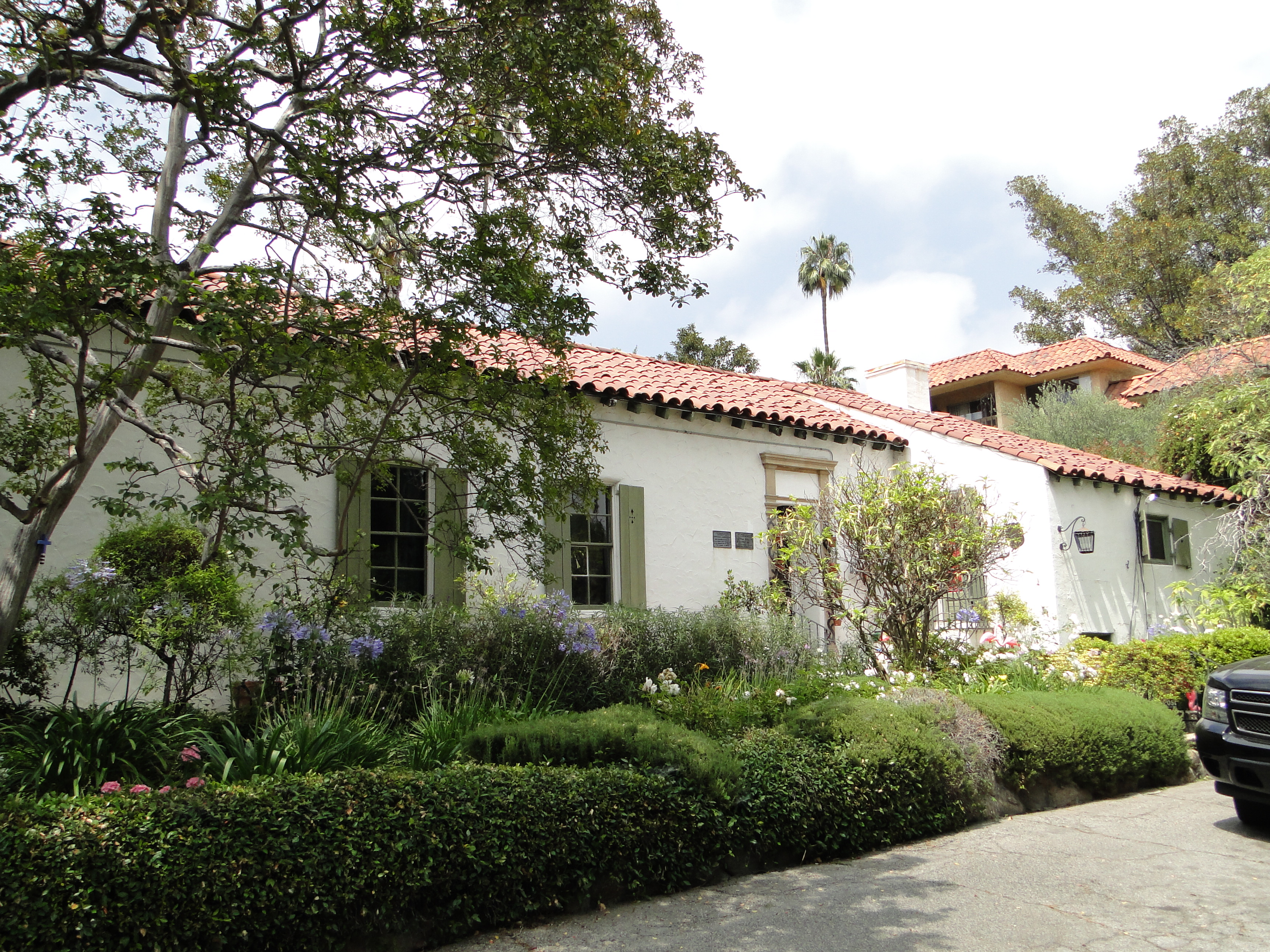
- Adobe Flores in 2011

- Location within the Los Angeles metropolitan area
- Location: 1804 Foothill Street, South Pasadena, California
- Coordinates: 34°7′11″N 118°8′46″W
- Area: 0.5 acres (0.20 ha)
- Built: 1846
- NRHP reference No.: 73000404
- Added to NRHP: June 18, 1973

Adobe Flores is a historic house in South Pasadena, California, U.S. It was built on Rancho San Pascual from 1838 to 1845. It was named for José María Flores. It was restored by architect Carleton Winslow in 1919. It has been listed on the National Register of Historic Places since June 18, 1973.

Today, it is now a private residence.

== Gallery ==
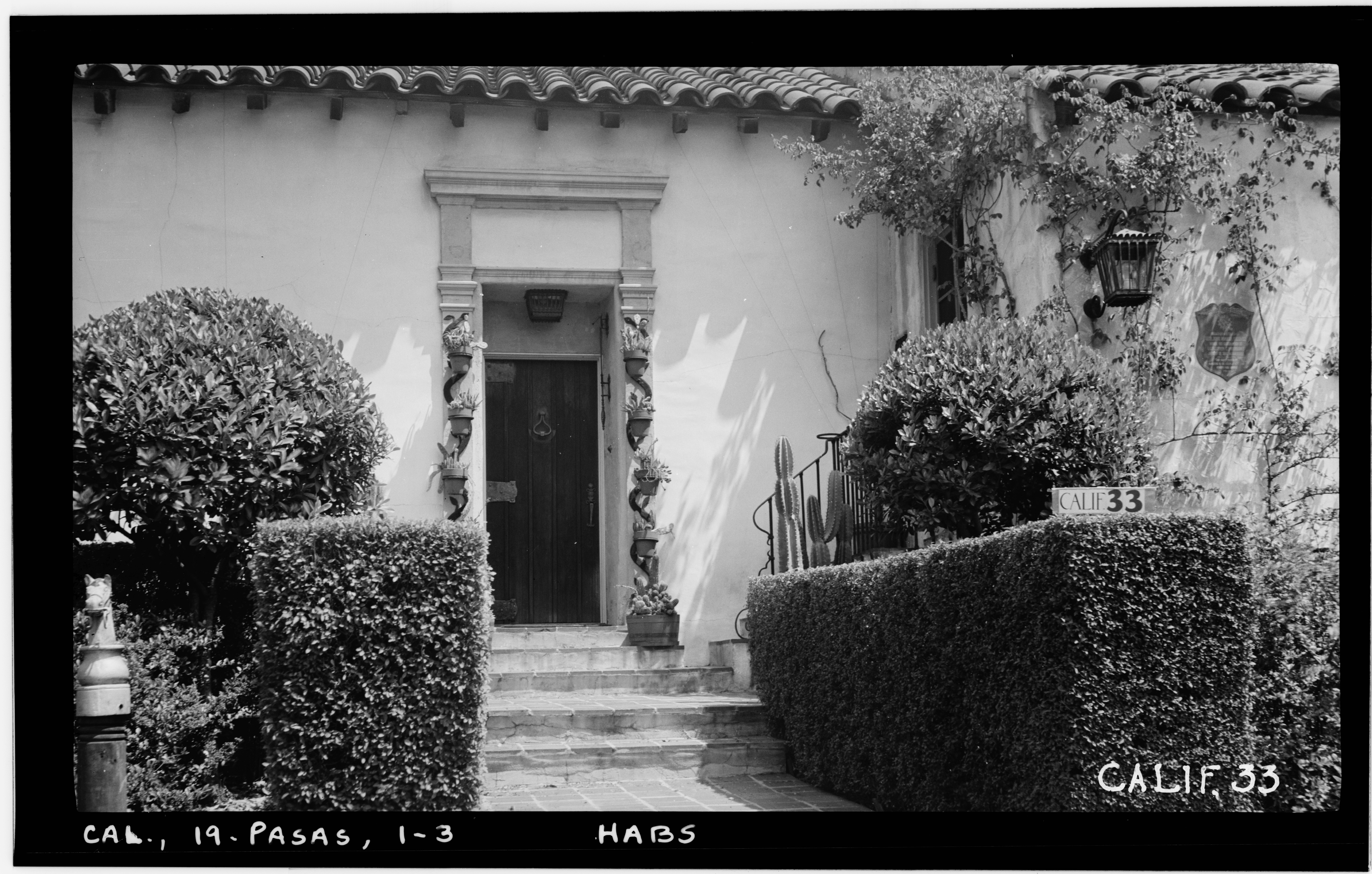
Detail of entrance door

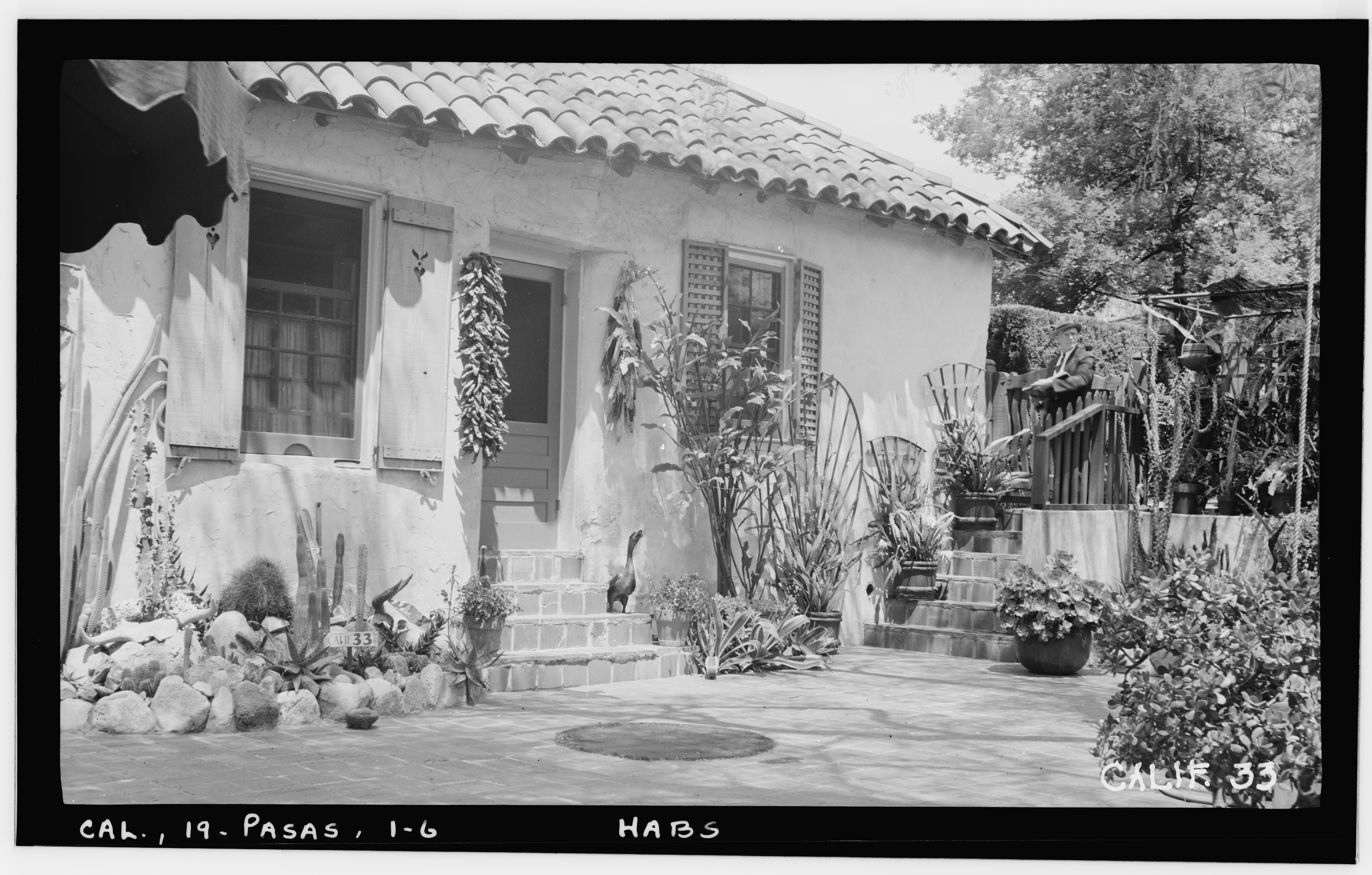
Detail of patio

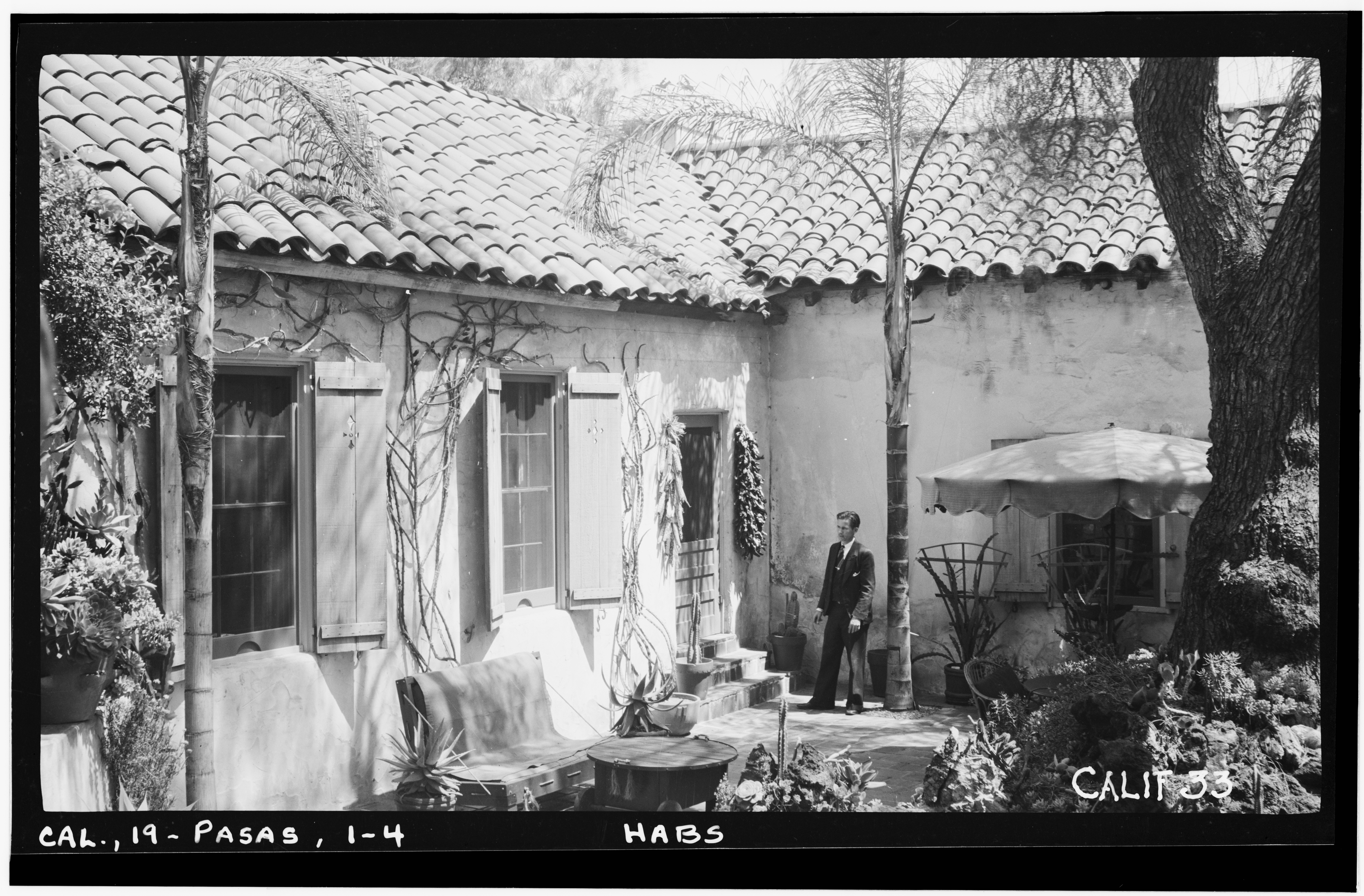
Detail of patio

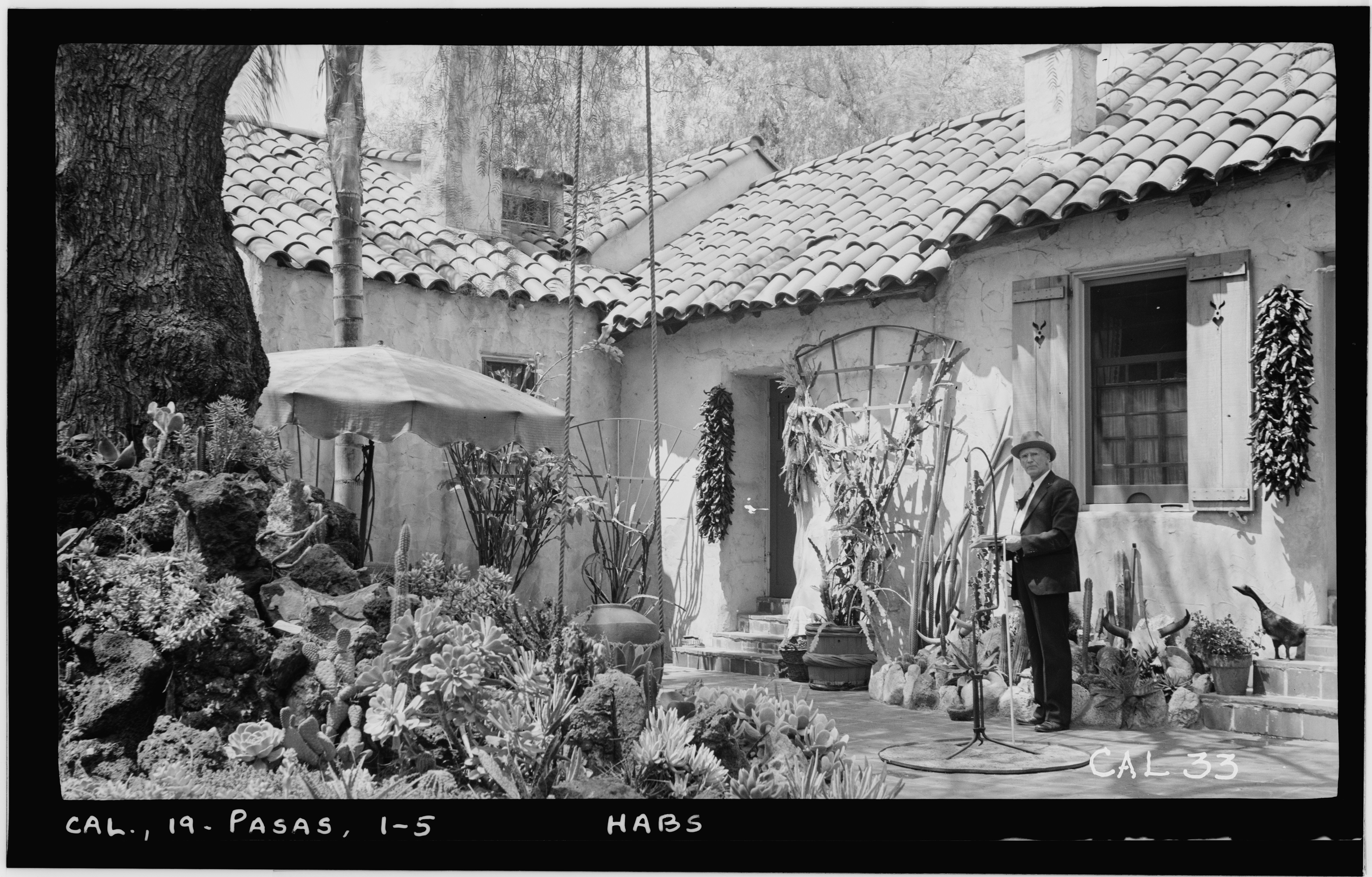
Detail of patio

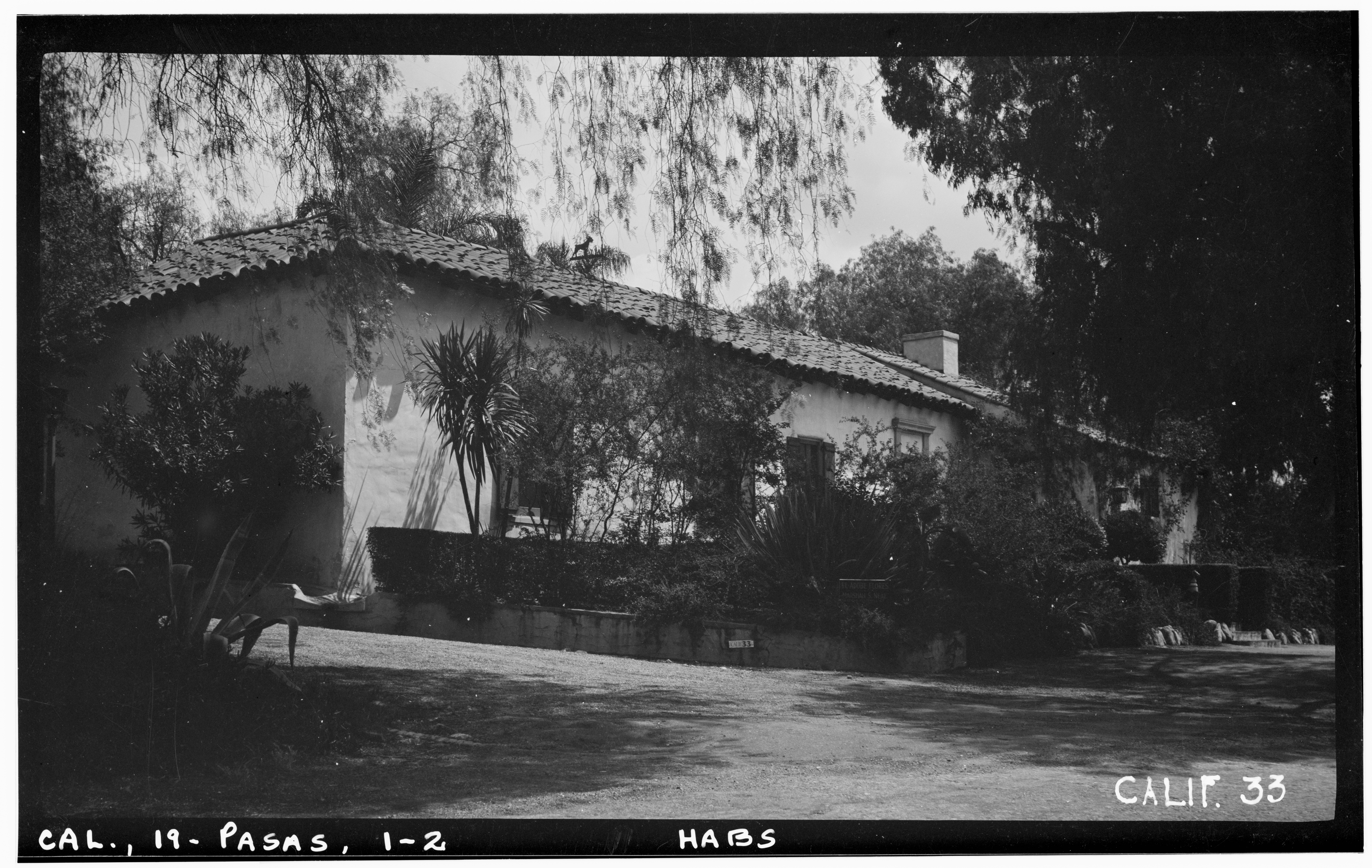
South elevation

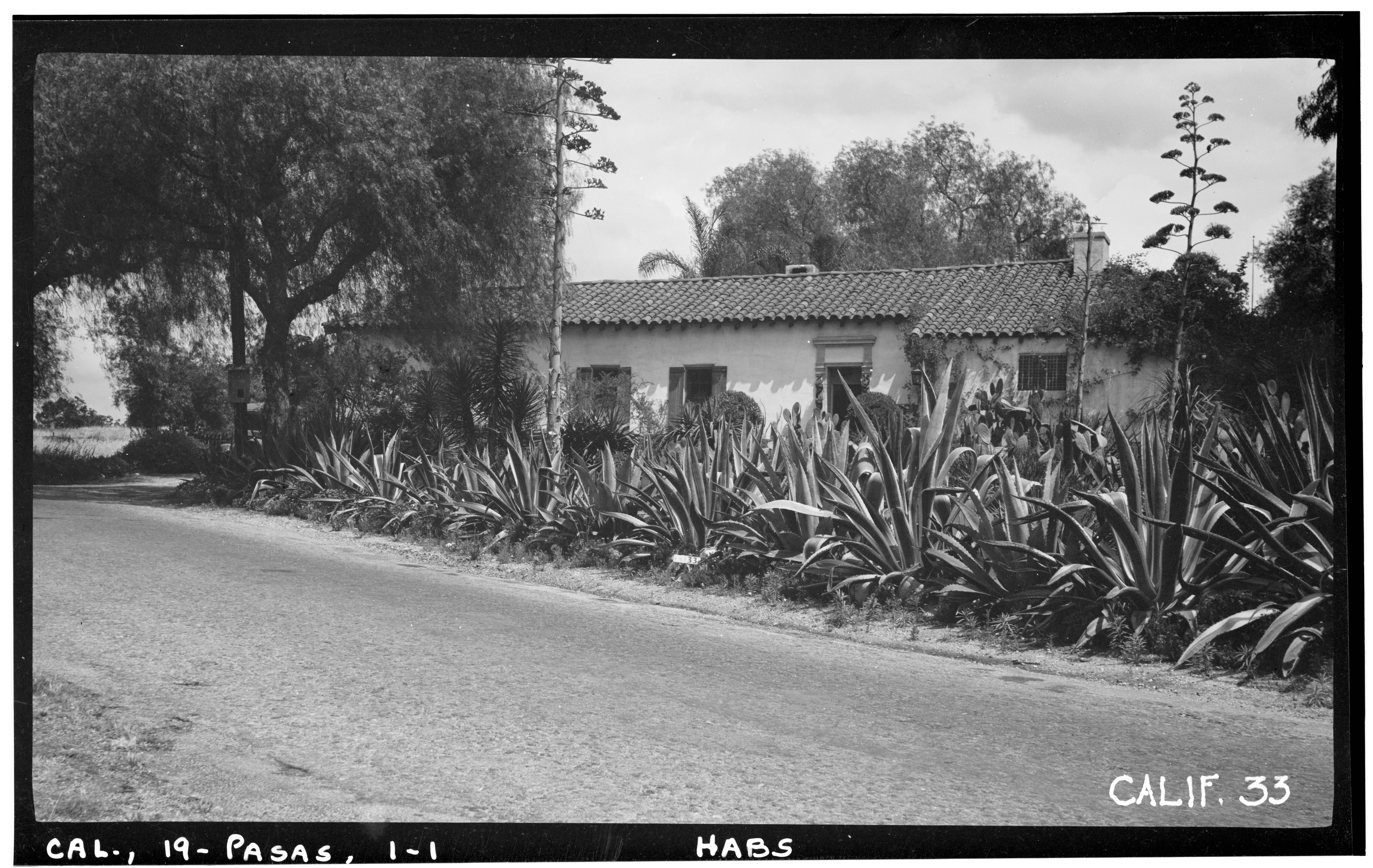
South elevation
