= Simeon Gannett Reed =

American businessman and entrepreneur

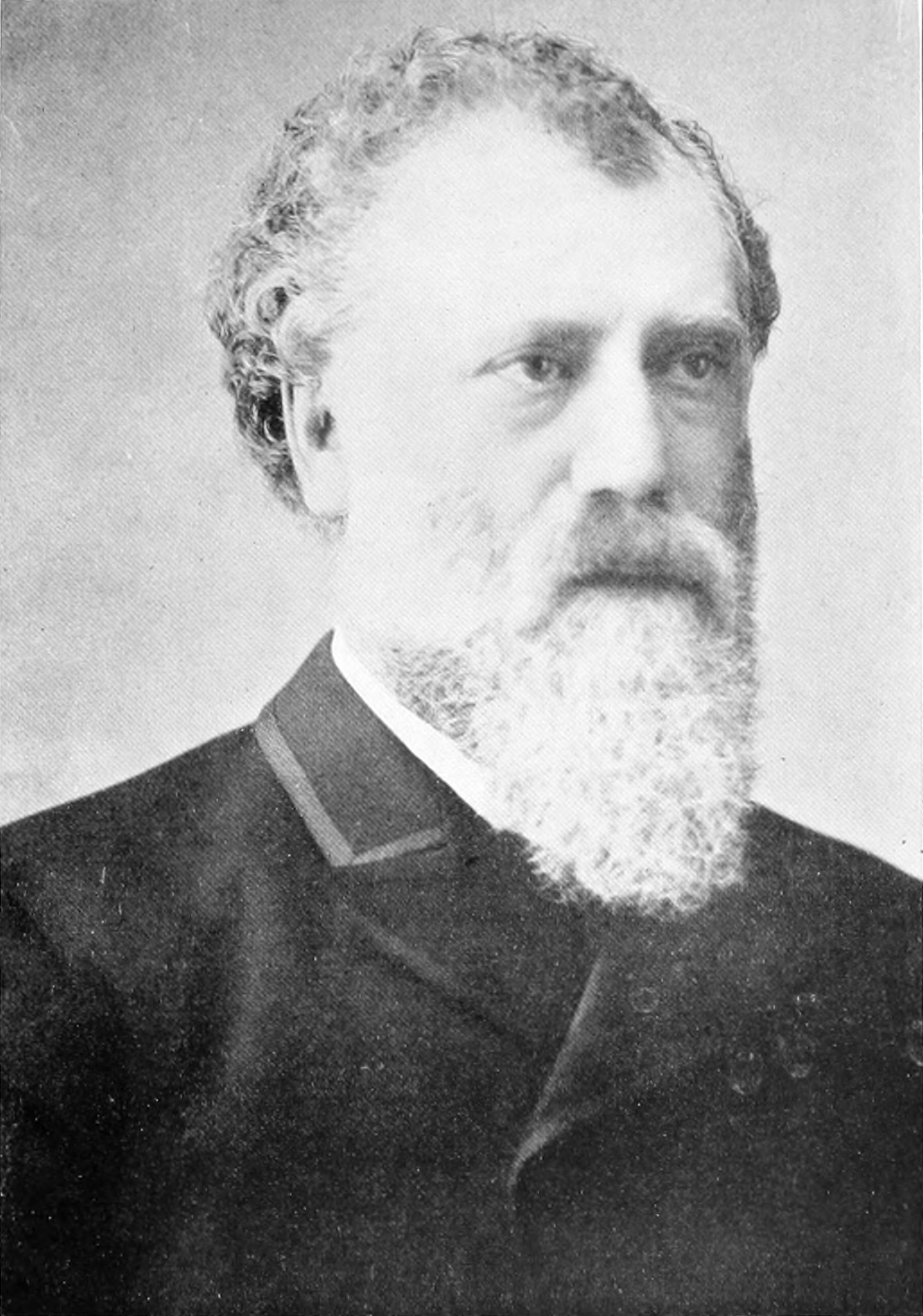
- Born: April 23, 1830; Abington, Massachusetts
- Died: November 7, 1895 (aged 65); California
- Occupation: Businessman
- Spouse: Amanda Reed

Simeon Gannett Reed (April 23, 1830 – November 7, 1895) was an American businessman and entrepreneur in Oregon. A native of Massachusetts, he made a fortune primarily in the transportation sector in association with William S. Ladd. Reedville, Oregon, and Reed College in Portland, Oregon are named after Reed.

== Early life ==
Simeon Gannett Reed was born on April 23, 1830, in East Abington, Massachusetts. He was born into a wealthy family and received his education at a private academy, graduating when he was 13 years old. After working and training as an apprentice in several vocations, he married Amanda Woods at the age of 20, with the couple not having any children. Woods was 18 at the time and a distant cousin of John Quincy Adams.

When he was 22, he collected supplies to sell in California and sailed there, setting up a store in a tent in Sacramento, while Amanda remained back east. Reed sold his goods and grain to the gold miners, but decided to relocate to what was then the Oregon Territory after a few trips there to purchase supplies.

== Oregon ==
Late in 1852, Reed started a mercantile in Rainier, Oregon, along the Columbia River downstream from Portland. After a short time, he relocated to Portland and became friends with William S. Ladd, a local merchant. In 1854, Amanda sailed to San Francisco to reunite with Reed, and accompanied Caroline Ames Elliott, Ladd's sweetheart who he married in San Francisco. In 1855, Reed became a clerk for Ladd, and in 1859 he became a partner in the company, which was then known as Ladd, Reed, & Co.

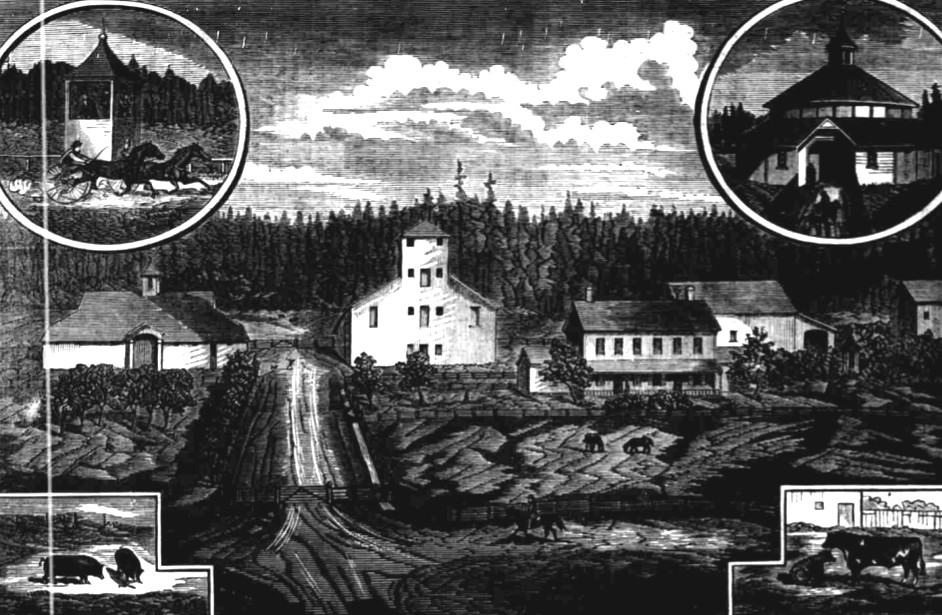
An 1880 lithograph of Reed's farm in Washington County, Oregon

In May 1860, Reed, Jacob Kamm, and John C. Ainsworth founded the Oregon Steam Navigation Company, a conglomerate of several river shipping companies plying the Columbia and Willamette rivers. Reed held 128 shares in the company, which even during the economic depression of 1873 produced $300,000 in dividends. Reed was also vice president of the firm. He built a mansion at First and Harrison streets in 1868, where the other wealthy residents were also constructing large homes.

In April 1880, the Oregon Steam Navigation Company merged with the companies of Henry Villard and Ben Holladay to form the Oregon Railway and Navigation Company. This created a single transportation conglomerate encompassing river shipping, stagecoach, and railroad ventures. Reed focused his energy now on meeting the demand for steel he anticipated due to Villard's Northern Pacific railroad. But Reed's Oregon Iron and Steel Company at Oswego suffered a lack of investment and never started production of the steel rails Reed expected; Reed lost half a million dollars in the venture.

Reed and Ladd also operated a hobby farm of more than 8,000-acre (32 km^{2}), on which they raised livestock and held harness races, in the area where Reedville, Oregon now stands, with Reed as namesake.

== Death and legacy ==
On November 7, 1895, Simeon Reed died while in California at his retirement home, "Carmelita", in Pasadena. His estate, worth millions of dollars, was left to Amanda, with instructions to use it to assist in the cultural and intellectual development of Portland. Amanda died in 1904 without much progress towards Simeon's instructions.

In 1908, Amanda's estate established Reed College in Portland. William M. Ladd (son of Reed's former partner William S. Ladd) provided the lands on which the college stands today, and almost all of Reed's estate was passed on to the college, Reed having left no heirs. Simeon and Amanda Reed are buried near the family plot of Jacob Kamm in Portland's River View Cemetery.

Reed Street, in Northwest Portland, is named for him.
