= Rancho San Pascual =

Mexican land grant in California

Coordinates: 34.150°N 118.140°W

Rancho San Pascual, also known as Rancho el Rincón de San Pascual, was a 14,403-acre (58.29 km^{2}) Mexican land grant in present-day Los Angeles County, California, given to Juan Marine in 1834 by Mexican governor José Figueroa. The former Rancho San Pascual land includes present-day cities of Pasadena, South Pasadena, and portions of San Marino, and the unincorporated communities of Altadena and San Pasqual.

== History ==
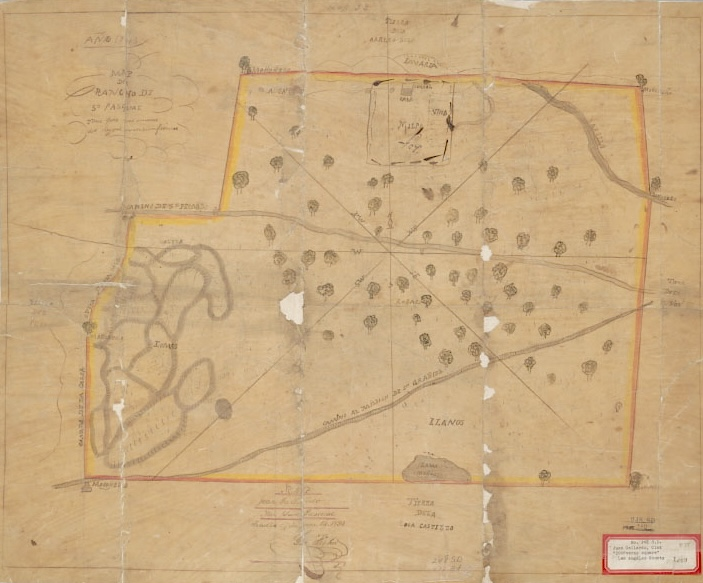
Rancho San Pascual (source: U.S. District Court. California, Southern District. Land case 248 SD, page 180; land case map E-1289, Bancroft Library)

After the Mission San Gabriel Arcángel was secularized in 1834, Governor José Figueroa granted Rancho San Pascual to Juan Mariné, a retired artillery lieutenant. Juan Marine's wife Maria Antonia Sepulveda had died in 1831. Marine married widow Eulalia Pérez de Guillén Mariné, who had served as mayordoma and keeper of the keys at the Mission.

After Juan Marine died in 1838, Mexican governor Alvarado granted title of the rancho to José Pérez and Enrique Sepúlveda in 1839. Both built small adobe houses near Arroyo Seco. Perez died in 1841 and Enrique Sepulveda died in 1843. Rancho San Pascual was once again abandoned.

Manuel Garfias, a lieutenant in the Mexican Army, denounced the former grant and claimed the land for himself. In 1843 Mexican Governor Micheltorena granted title of Rancho San Pasqual to Garfias. Garfias served as an officer in Micheltorena's "Batalon Fijo de Californias" (the Fixed Battalion of California) from 1842 to 1845. Garfias married Luisa Avila, the daughter of Francisco Avila and María Encarnación Sepúlveda Avila, who owned Rancho Las Cienegas and the Avila Adobe.

With the cession of California to the United States following the Mexican–American War, the 1848 Treaty of Guadalupe Hidalgo provided that the historic land grants would be honored. But the US required, under its Land Act of 1851, that Mexicans file claims for their land grants. María Merced Lugo de Foster and María Antonia Perez June filed a claim for Rancho San Pascual to the Public Land Commission for three square leagues based on the Alvarado grant to Enrique Sepulveda and José Perez, but this was rejected. Cases were complicated and many American migrants competed to acquire such Mexican lands.

Garfias received a US patent for 13,694 acres (55.4 km^{2}) based on the Micheltorena grant. American Benjamin "Don Benito" Wilson acquired a small part of the Rancho in 1852, and received a US patent for 709 acres (2.9 km^{2}).

Garfias sold portions of San Pascual to finance the building of an elaborate adobe manor that he constructed along the east bank of the Arroyo Seco. This expensive adobe was his new headquarters of Rancho San Pascual, but financing it resulted in Garfias lohing is land. Benjamin Wilson bought the rest of the rancho from Garfias in 1858.

Two years later, in 1860, Wilson sold a half interest in Rancho San Pascual to John S. Griffin. Griffin sold portions of his share to Dr. Benjamin S. Eaton, the father of Fred Eaton. In 1872, American George Stoneman bought 400 acres (1.6 km^{2}) from Wilson. Stoneman later served as Governor of California.

In 1873, Daniel M. Berry, a purchasing agent for the Indiana Colony of California, came to Rancho San Pascual. Berry purchased a large portion of the property along the Arroyo Seco and on January 31, 1874, incorporated the Indiana Colony.

== Historic sites of the Rancho ==
- Adobe Flores built by José Pérez. After being defeated at the Battle of La Mesa, Jose Maria Flores camped at Rancho San Pascual near the adobe.
- Governor Stoneman Adobe, Los Robles.

== See also ==
- Eulalia Pérez de Guillén Mariné
- Ranchos of California
- List of Ranchos of California
