= Indiana Colony =

The Indiana Colony
- Agricultural settlement
- Interactive map of The Indiana Colony
- Coordinates: 34.1434°N 118.1587°W
- State: California
- County: Los Angeles
- Organized: July 8, 1873 as California Colony of Indiana
- Certified: January 27, 1874 as San Gabriel Orange Growers Association
- Post Office granted: August, 1876 to Pasadena
- Founder: Thomas Balch Elliot

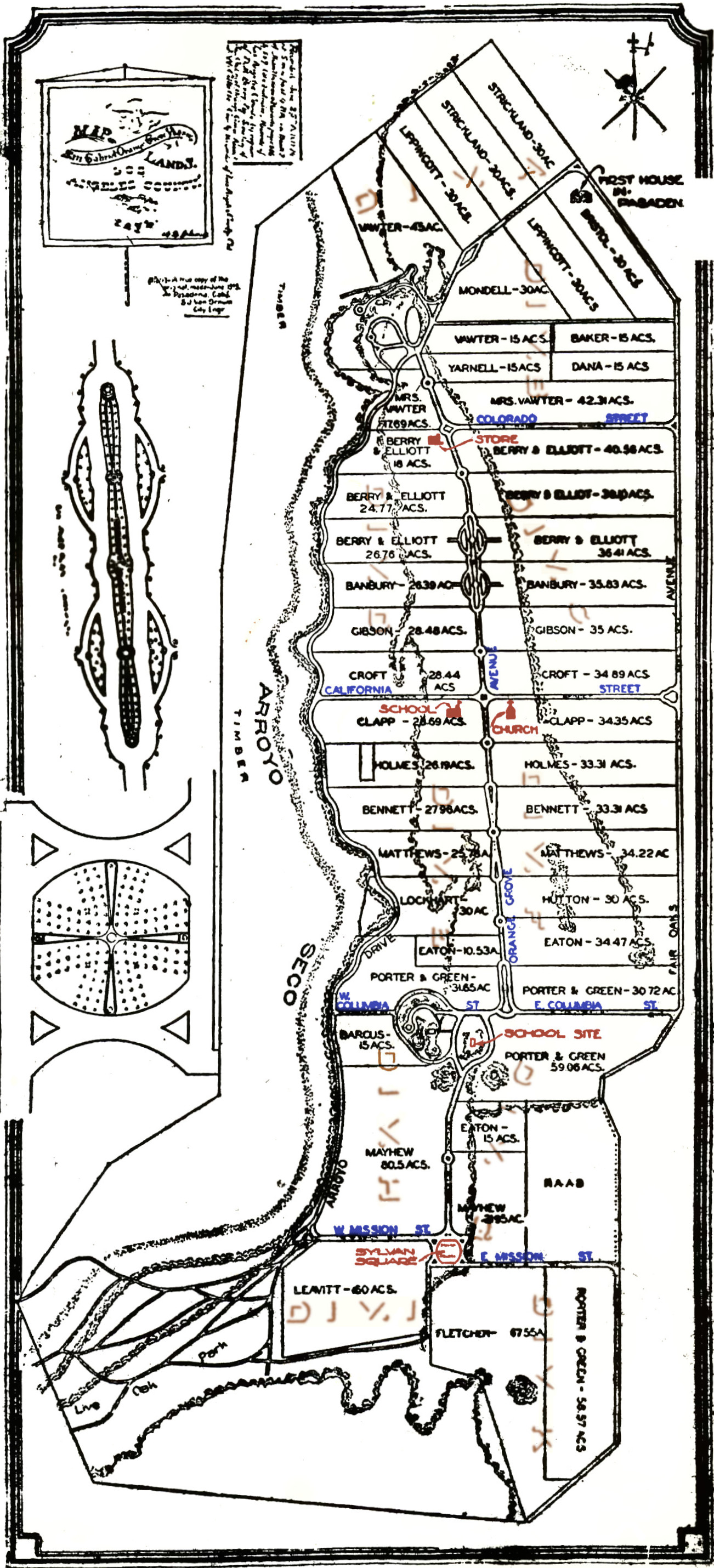
Map of the Indiana Colony showing each parcel and its owner.

The Indiana Colony is the name of the cooperative who originally settled in the area known today as Pasadena, California, United States, as well as their first name for the area they settled. The group was incorporated on January 31, 1874, by Indiana residents seeking warmer weather after the exceptionally cold winter of 1872–73. The settlers met in the home of Thomas Elliott, and Daniel Berry was selected to visit Southern California with a direction to find suitable land at a suitable price.

Berry visited San Diego, Anaheim, San Fernando, Rancho Santa Anita and Rancho San Pascual. After meeting Judge Benjamin Eaton and Benjamin Davis "Don Benito" Wilson, he was able to negotiate the purchase of lands in the eastern part of Rancho San Pascual near the Arroyo Seco. The recession of 1873 caused a few initial investors to withdraw from the settlement plans. Berry immediately reincorporated the company into the San Gabriel Orange Grove Association, enlisting any interested parties and salvaging the purchasing power of the settlement.

The nearly 4,000-acre (16 km^{2}) property would become The Indiana Colony, the genesis of present-day Pasadena, California.

== Reason for moving ==
In 1873 the Midwest had been hit by its hardest winter in history, leading many of those in Indianapolis to long for a warmer climate and an environment where they could live among citrus groves and perennial flowers. With the laying of the Transcontinental Railroad in 1869, the idea of moving west became more possible and affordable. It was at the home of Dr. and Mrs. Thomas Elliott that a group of neighbors, including Mrs. Elliott's brother, Daniel M. Berry, first discussed the idea of going west.

Berry was a former teacher become journalist who had a great interest in his brother-in-law's granary. He was also an asthmatic and the Midwestern weather went hard on him. He contacted Harris Newmark, who had recently purchased Rancho Santa Anita, and was able to get pertinent information on the southland. Newmark even stopped by Indianapolis and gave a first-hand account of California to the Elliotts et al. From that meeting the Hoosiers formed "The California Colony of Indiana". It took little time to fill the limited roll of the organization's membership.

Next was the task of investigating the California properties.

== Selection of territory ==
From a committee of four it was Daniel Berry who was left to set off to scout land in Southern California for the group of Indianapolis investors. He visited five regions: San Diego, Anaheim, San Fernando, Rancho Santa Anita and Rancho San Pascual. He was given a budgetary target of $5 per acre with which to negotiate.

San Diego seemed an ideal spot and the price was right, but a series of windmills would have had to be set up to pump water. The Company rejected the idea. He determined San Bernardino to be too hot. In Anaheim he didn't care for the superabundance of fleas nor the number of "musketers" (gun toters). Of San Fernando, he said the price at $2 per acre was acceptable, but the area was only good for growing grain. There was too little access to water for citrus growing. The Indianans had their hearts set on orchards. Rancho Santa Anita was the collective lands of today's Arcadia, Monrovia, Duarte, El Monte, and Baldwin Park. The property had absolutely everything required for citrus growing, but was too expensive at $20 per acre.

On September 12, 1873, Berry met Judge Benjamin Eaton, who represented Dr. John S. Griffin of the Fair Oaks Ranch (near east Altadena) on Rancho San Pascual where Berry had his first good night's sleep in years. He fell in love with Rancho San Pascual, and to keep his find a secret, he attached a cryptic name to the place as "Muscat" for the grapes that were grown so abundantly over the hillsides.

== Southern California Orange Grove Assoc. ==
The land was being offered for $10 per acre, but there was indecision between Dr. Griffin and Benjamin Wilson on dividing properties. Berry wrote Elliott requesting the money to purchase what he could of Rancho San Pascual. The mail turnaround response was two weeks; it was September 19 before the word got to Indiana. The Company decided to come closer to the asking price of Santa Anita with an offer of $15 per acre. This negotiation was never destined for success. For one, the owner Newmark was not at home; two, the N. Y. Stock Market had been struck by a panic and ruined the financial plans for the Indiana Colony.

Elliott retained a few of the original investors and forwarded only $200 as a down payment on $25,000 of Muscat property. Berry turned promoter and selectively enlisted more investors into the company under a new California incorporation, "The San Gabriel Orange Growers Association". He sold 100 shares at $250 per share and salvaged the purchasing power of the company.

As Griffin and Wilson settled their land divisions, the association negotiated for a strip of 2,576 acres (10 km^{2}) near the Arroyo Seco. Griffin offered an additional 1,386 acres (6 km^{2}), which he acquired from Wilson free of charge and taxes, to the Colony as well. It was considered a gesture of good faith, but actually, it was the sloughing of what was considered to be worthless highland property that would one day become Altadena. The lower tract of land would become The Indiana Colony.

== Renaming the colony ==
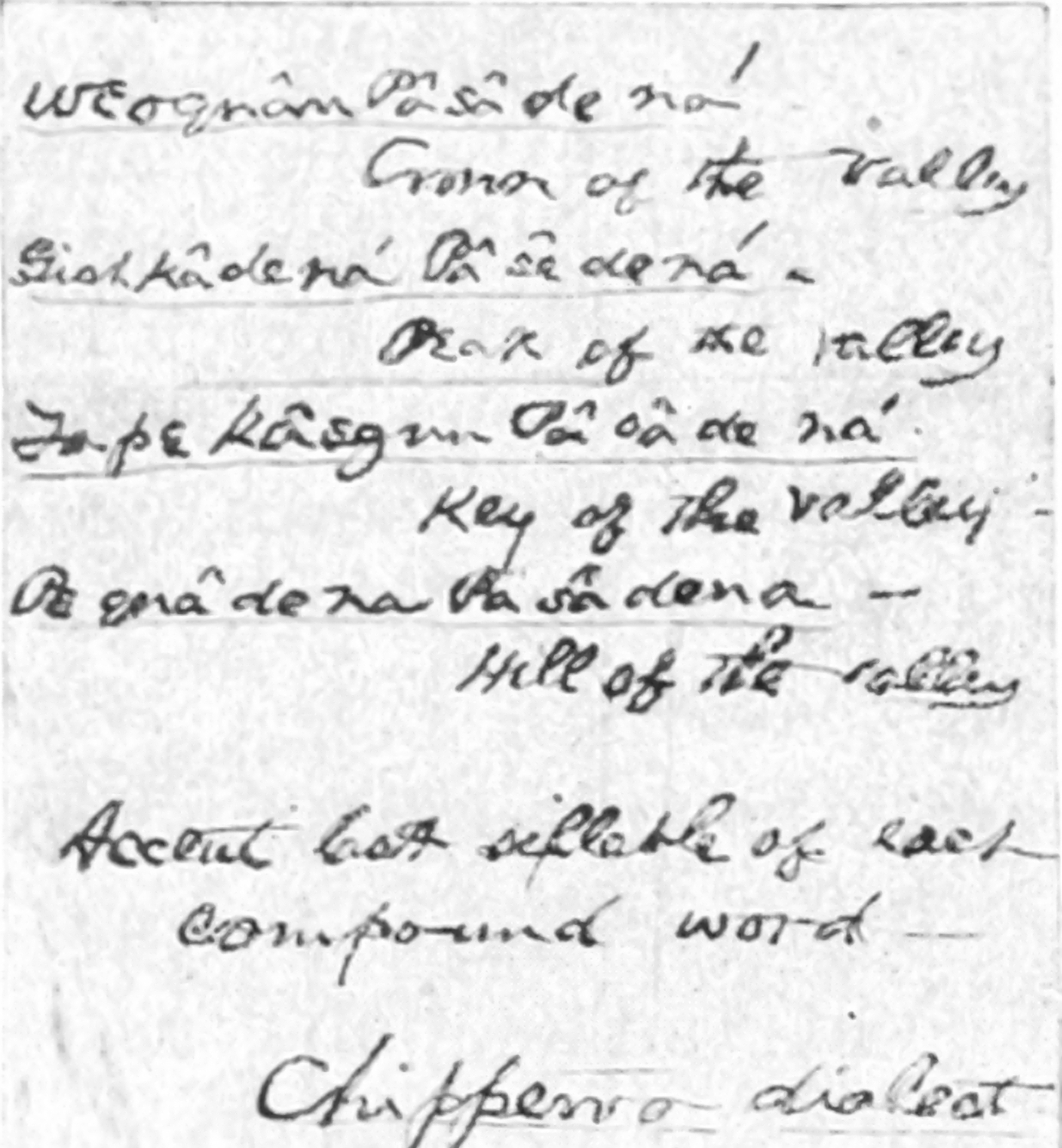
Suggestions sent to T. B . Elliott in Chippewa of names for Pasadena.

The enclave lived happily under its original name until 1876 when community members wanted their own post office. For the two and a half years up to this time, the mail was being brought from Los Angeles by one resident's son who was going to school there. Mail meant for the colony was delivered to Los Angeles earmarked for "Indiana Colony," but when the community applied for a post office, the Postmaster General rejected their name. Thus began the search for a new name for the community. Several other names were suggested, but the postal department in Washington rejected them all. Eventually it accepted the name Pasadena. When T. B. Elliott first came to the valley Judge Eaton had shown him around the area. He mentioned that the saddle of land the Indiana colony occupied was the "key to the valley" inasmuch as it was the point of easiest entry, and thus made it simple to control traffic in and out of it. With this in mind, Elliott wrote to a friend who was fluent in Chippewa and asked him for suggestions that sounded pleasant but also indicated the special relationship the spot had to the surrounding terrain. Each suggestion his friend sent back contained the phrase, "pasadena," so this was the name Elliott chose for the name of the post office and community.

== See also ==
- Photos of the Indiana Colony, archived version
- Early Views of Pasadena, archived version
