= Battle of San Pasqual =

Mexican-American War battle

- Part of the Conquest of California; Mexican–American War
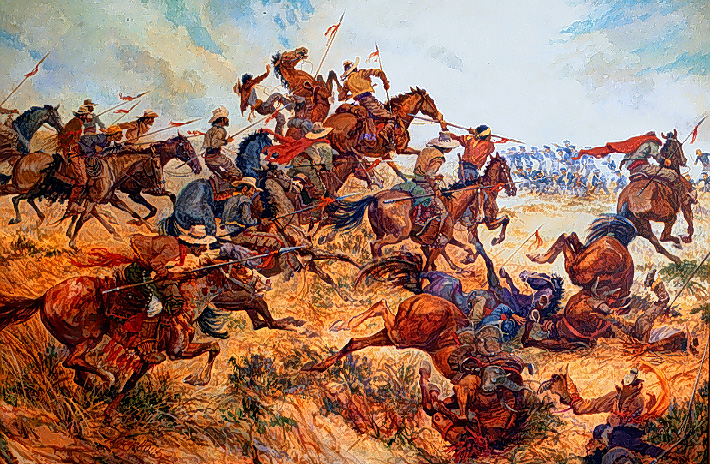
- Battle of San Pasqual, Charles Waterhouse
Date	December 6–7, 1846
Location	San Pasqual Pueblo, Alta California; Modern Day: San Pasqual Valley, San Diego, California 33°5′10″N 116°59′24″W
Result	See assessment

Belligerents
United States	Mexico

Commanders and leaders
Stephen Kearny; Archibald H. Gillespie	Andrés Pico

Strength
150	75

Casualties and losses
18 killed 13 wounded	2–6 killed (Note: Sources differ on how many Californios were killed during the battle, with Pico claiming none had died, Vejar claiming two had died, and an American claiming six had died.); 12 wounded 1 captured
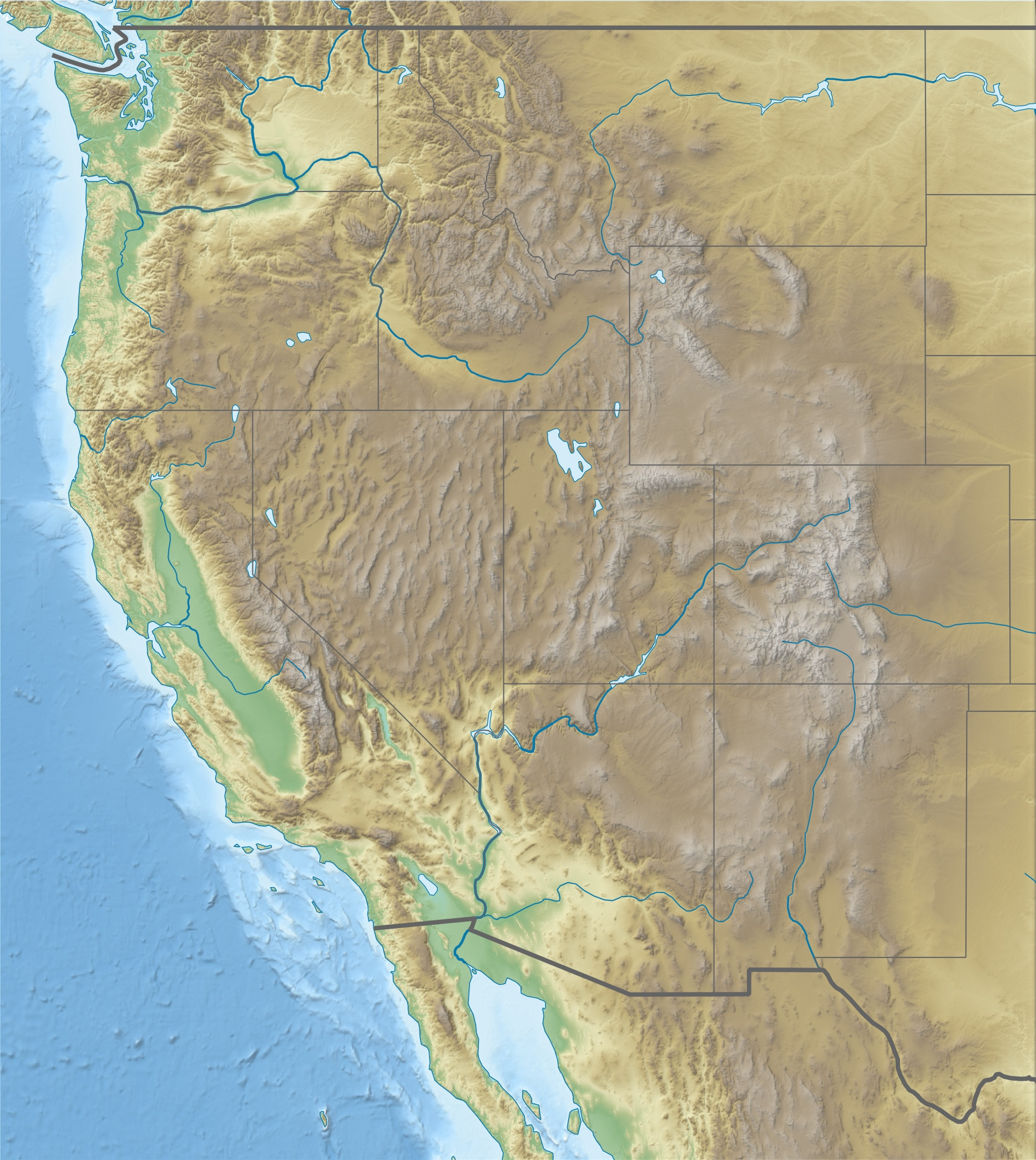
- Location within modern-day United States

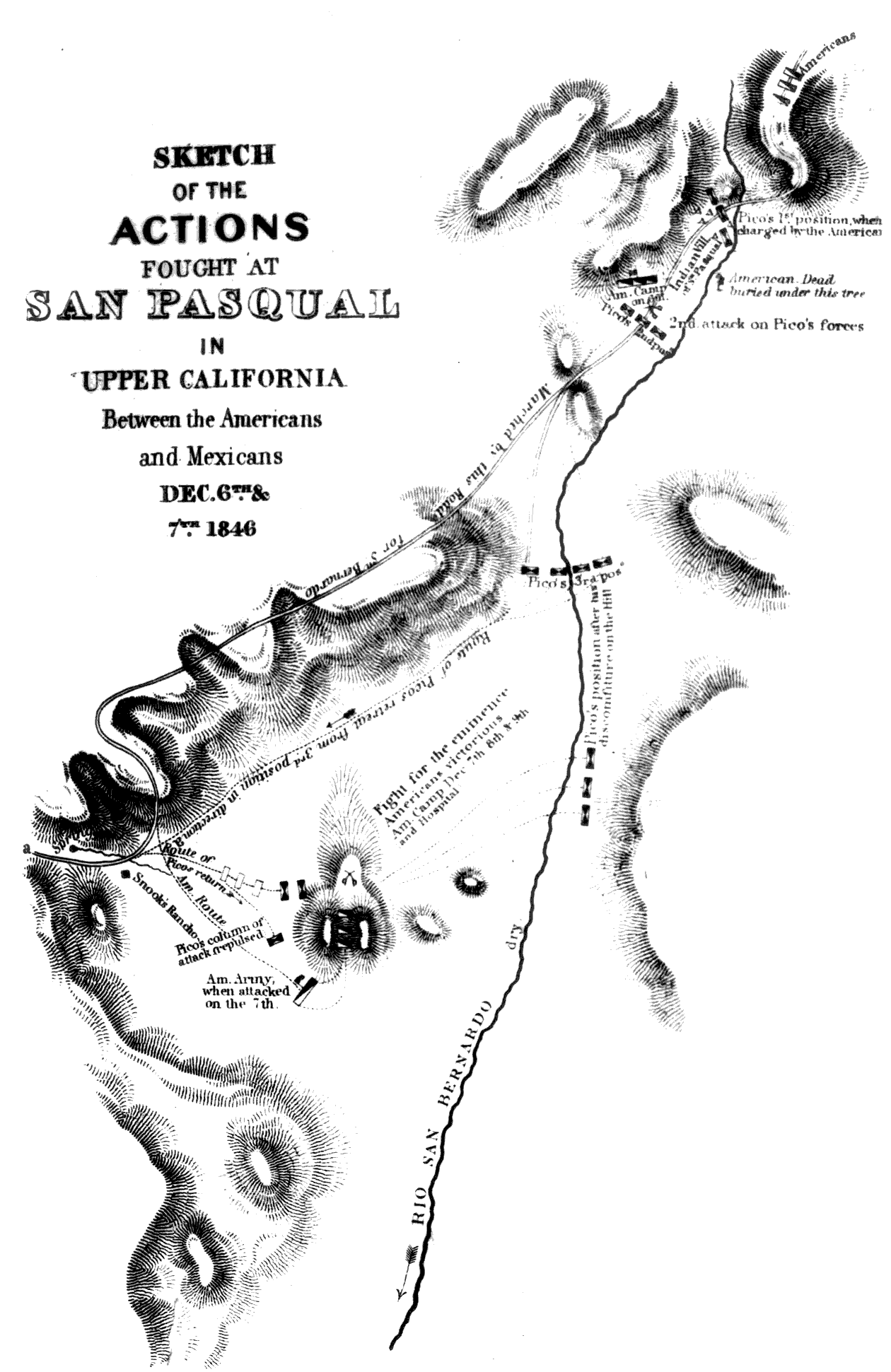
A map of the battle site

The Battle of San Pasqual, also spelled San Pascual, was a military encounter that occurred during the Mexican–American War in what is now the San Pasqual Valley community in the county of San Diego, California. The series of military skirmishes ended with both sides claiming victory, and the victor of the battle is still debated. On December 6 and 7, 1846, General Stephen W. Kearny's US Army of the West, along with a small detachment of the California Battalion led by Archibald H. Gillespie, engaged a small contingent of Californio Lancers, led by Major Andrés Pico. After U.S. reinforcements arrived, Kearny's troops were able to reach San Diego.

== Background ==
On 30 June 1846, just after the outbreak of the war, Colonel Stephen W. Kearny was promoted to brigadier general in command of the Army of the West at Fort Leavenworth in Kansas. Kearny mustered 300 US Army regulars, 1,000 volunteers from Missouri, and the Mormon Battalion of 500 men. His orders were to conquer New Mexico and California, establish civilian governments there, and to "act in such a manner as best to conciliate the inhabitants, and render them friendly to the United States".

From Fort Leavenworth, Kearny moved via Bent's Fort to New Mexico, which submitted without fighting. Kearny established Fort Marcy at Santa Fe.

Kearny continued west with 300 troops. His force interacted with the Apache and Maricopa tribes, and captured a Mexican courier with news of American activities in California. Kearny learned that a naval force under Commodore Sloat had taken control of Monterey, the capital of Alta California. Kearny had orders to assume command of U.S. forces in California. On 6 October, Kearny met Kit Carson near Socorro. Carson informed him that the naval force (now under Commodore Robert F. Stockton) had occupied most of California.

Kearny decided that a smaller force could move faster. Keeping only about 100 men of Companies C & K, 1st Dragoons, he sent 200 men back to Santa Fe, where there were problems with the Navajo. Guided by Carson, Kearny's force reached Warner's Ranch in California on 2 December, travel-weary and in a greatly weakened condition. They had just completed a 2,000 mile march; the longest march in U.S. Army history. Needing remounts, Kearny's men rounded up mules and half-broken horses around Warner's Ranch, most of them belonging to José María Flores, comandante general of the Californios.

General Kearny's Army, most originating from Fort Scott:

- Captain Abraham Robinson Johnston – regimental adjutant, Company K, 12 mounted dragoons
- Captain Benjamin (Ben) Daviess Moore – Company C, 60 dismounted dragoons, some mounted on mules
- Captain Henry Smith Turner – Kearny's Army of the West Adjutant general
- Lieutenant William H. Emory – Chief Topographical Engineer, Corps of Topographical Engineers
- Lieutenant William H. Warner – Corps of Topographical Engineers, commanding four topographical engineering "mountainmen" Peterson, Londeau, Perrot, and Private Francois Menard
- Lieutenant John W. Davidson – commanded two howitzers and six dragoons placed at the rear of the advance
- Second Lieutenant Thomas (Tom) C. Hammond – aide-de-camp
- Major Swords – assistant quartermaster – rear guard for baggage train, officers' personal slaves, and civilians
- U.S. Army Surgeon (Captain) Dr. John S. Griffin
- Enlisted men:
  - Judge Pearce (Kearny's personal bodyguard), Sergeant Williams, Pat Halpin (bugler), Sergeant Falls, Sergeant John Cox, Private William B. Dunne, Private David Streeter, Private James Osbourne, (Private) Dr. Erasmus Darwin French (physician assistant)
  - Company C: Corporal William C. West, Private George Ashmead, Private Joseph T. Campbell, Private John Dunlop, Private William Dalton, Private William C. Leckey, Private Samuel F. Repoll, Private Joseph B. Kennedy,
  - Company K: 1st Sergeant Otis L. Moor, Sergeant William Whitness, Corporal George Ramsdale, farrier David W. Johnston, Private William G. Gholston, Private William H. Fiel, Private Robert S. Gregory, Private Hugh McKaffray

Captains Johnston, Griffin (Surgeon), and Turner kept journals during their journey from Santa Fe. Lieutenant W. H. Emory of the Topographical Engineers kept the official designated U.S. Government diary, or "Military Reconnoissance" [sic] from Ft. Leavenworth to California which was published in 1848.

After turning back the Americans trying to recapture Los Angeles in the Battle of Dominguez Rancho, Capt. Jose Maria Flores sent about 100 men to San Luis Obispo to confront Lt. Col. John C. Fremont's 300 men moving south from Monterey, and sent another 100 men to watch Stockton's base at San Diego, but Flores kept the bulk of his men at Los Angeles.

Captain Archibald Gillespie with 39 men, met Kearny on December 5 with a message from Stockton requesting Kearny confront Flores' men outside San Diego. The total American force now amounted to 179 men.

USMC Acting-Captain (Lt.) Gillespie's Mounted Rifle Volunteers 'detachment' of the California Battalion:

- 10 U.S. Navy carbiners from 'Fleet on the Pacific Coast' F Company aboard the USS Congress commanded by Acting-Lieutenant Edward Fitzgerald Beale and Passed-Midshipman James M. Duncan (later commanded USS Norwich (1861) )
- Sutter Fort's Russian brass 4-pounder cannon, which had been hidden after Mexican authorities tried to use the cannon against Californios at the Battle of Cahuenga Pass during the 1831 tax revolt. Charles Weber disclosed its location to Gillespie.
- 26 Mounted Rifle Company, commanded by Acting-Captain (Sgt.) Samual Gibson (later commanded company B of 26th Arkansas Infantry Regiment) and longtime Kit Carson and John Fremont associate, Acting-Lieutenant Alexis Godey: including Antoine Robidoux (interpreter), Philip Crosthwaite, Beatitude Patitoux, William Henry Russell, Daniel Sexton, Franklin Sears, Thomas Burgess, Jean Nutrelle, Private Henry Booker.
- Rafael Machado, Californio guide provided by San Diego

Captains Leonardo Cota and Jose Alipaz took a force to San Pasqual Valley with the intention to interdict and keep in check Captain Gillespie after his departure from San Diego. Later, Major Andrés Pico, after a failed search for a detachment of U.S. soldiers, joined forces with the captains and took command. These Californios led a force consisting of landowners, sons of landowners, and vaqueros, many with well known and respected family names in the community:

- Don Leonardo Cota: Capt. Enrique Abilia (Los Angeles), Capt. Ramon Carillo (Los Angeles), Capt. Jose Maria Cota (Los Angeles), Capt. Carlos Dominguez (Los Angeles), Capt. Nicolas Hermosillo (Los Angeles), Capt. Jose Alipaz (San Juan Capistrano), Capt. Ramon O. Suna (San Diego)
- General Andres Pico: Don Leandro Osuna (San Diego), Capt. Juan Bautista Moreno, Capt. Tomás A. Sanchez, Capt. Pablo Vejar, Capt. Manuel Vejar

On the night of December 5, a Native American informed the Californio forces of the presence of Kearny's forces.

== Prelude ==
A dragoon patrol under Lieutenant Thomas C. Hammond, guided by Rafael Machado, the son of Don José Manuel Machado (grantee of Rancho El Rosario and sent by the Machado family to assist Kearny), reconnoitered Capt. Andres Pico's force along the road at San Pasqual.

While Machado sneaked into the camp, Lt. Hammond became suspicious he was being set up for an ambush and rode the dragoons into the camp, where they spoke with an Indian they found sleeping in a hut. In a coincidence that has never been fully explained, a guard under the command of Machado's concuñado, the brother of a brother-in-law and future father-in-law, Captain Jose Alipaz, challenged the dragoons and alerted the camp to their presence. While Machado quickly ran back to Hammond's scouting party, Alipaz sounded the alarm but was dismissed by General Pico, until a U.S. Army blanket and dragoon coat were discovered on the edge of camp by Pablo Véjar. With Capt. Alipaz, Captain Leonardo Cota and José María Ibarra (the Californio standing guard) chased the dragoons to the top of the next ridge with the battle cry of "!Viva California!". Pico was alerted, and the Californio camp prepared for the U.S. Army dragoons and marines to attack.

Kearny had planned a surprise attack at daylight, despite the damp weather wetting down their powder and the extremely poor state of the soldiers' equipment and mounts – mostly mules, as the horses had died on the preceding march.

== Battle ==
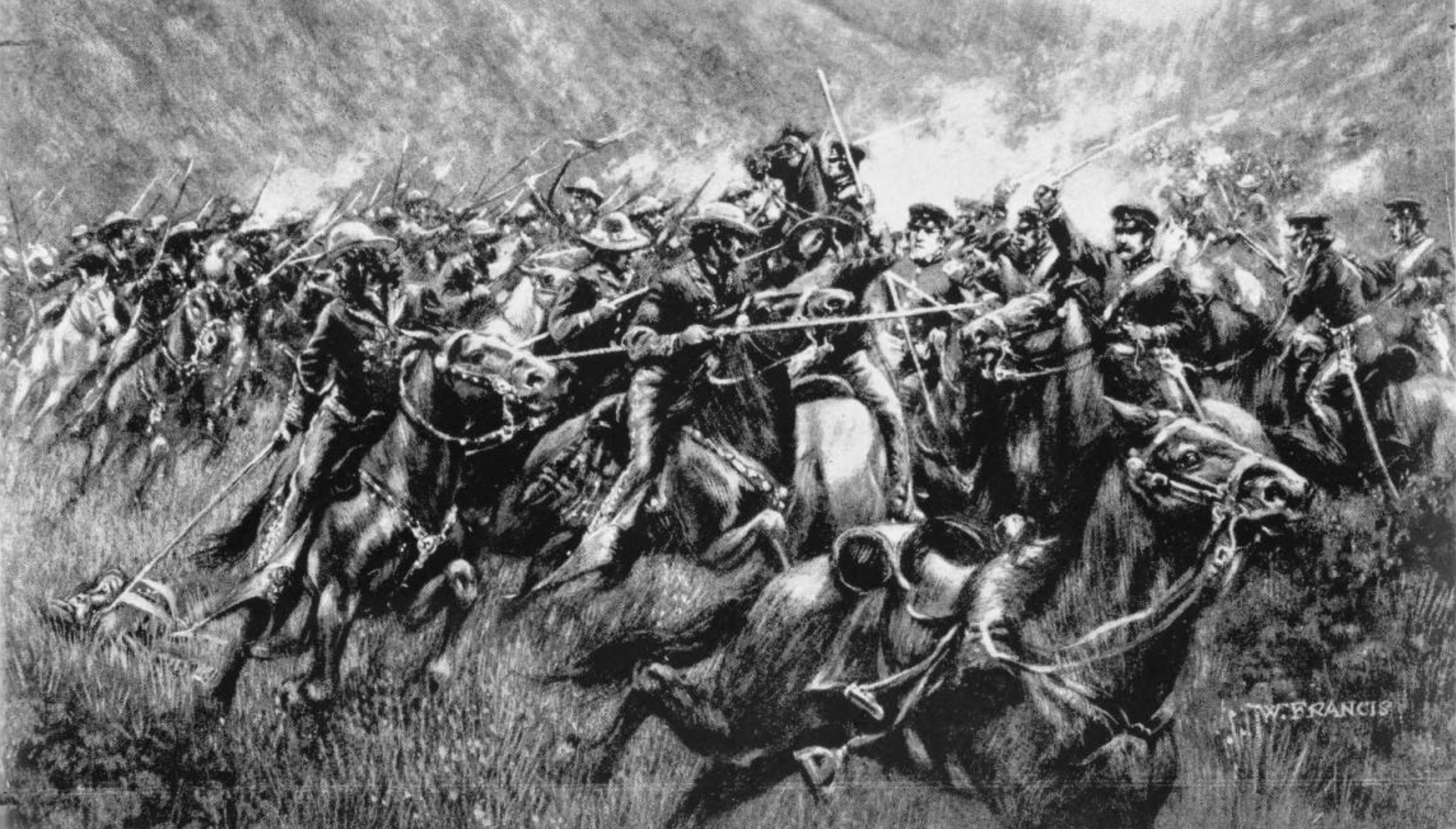
The Charge of the Caballeros depicts the Californio lancers at the Battle of San Pasqual.

Having lost the element of surprise, at midnight Kearny ordered an immediate advance from his camp nine miles away. It had rained that night. Men, muskets, pistols and equipment were wet and cold, but the troops, after over six months without any action, were eager to engage the Californios. Early in the morning of December 6, 1846, the column proceeded by twos across the ridge between Santa Maria (present day Ramona, California) and San Pasqual. During the descent, while it was still dark and with a low-lying fog, Kearny's force became strung out and were caught in a disadvantageous position by General Pico's swift advance. Kearny gave the plan of battle prior to proceeding down into the valley, to keep all casualties to a minimum, to encircle San Pasqual to capture fresh mounts.

Captain Abraham R. Johnston's advance guard, while still three-quarters of a mile (1.2 km) from Pico's forces, was ordered by Kearny to "Trot!", which Johnston misunderstood as "Gallop!". Seeing this Kearny exclaimed "Oh, heavens! I did not mean that!". Forty of the best mounted pulled far ahead of the main body of the force, in violation of the Cavalry Tactics manual of 1841, which instructed a charge to begin at just 40 paces from the enemy "so as to arrive in good order, and without fatiguing the horses." The mules pulling the howitzers bolted, taking one of the guns with them. Pico's mounted force remained ahead of the pursuing U.S. forces. Their fresh horses and superior horsemanship allowed them to outmaneuver and lead the advance group of dragoons away from the main force. The Californios had a distinct advantage over the U.S. soldiers in their knowledge of the terrain. A second separation developed until twenty-eight dragoons, including Kearny, were separated. Damp powder reduced the effectiveness of carbines to clubs and pistols to hammers, as described by Felicita, a San Pasqual Indian who witnessed the battle. The Californios were armed with long lances and reatas (braided rawhide lariat), which they used with great effect. As a consequence, Johnston's charge was unsupported and his dragoons were forced to withdraw.

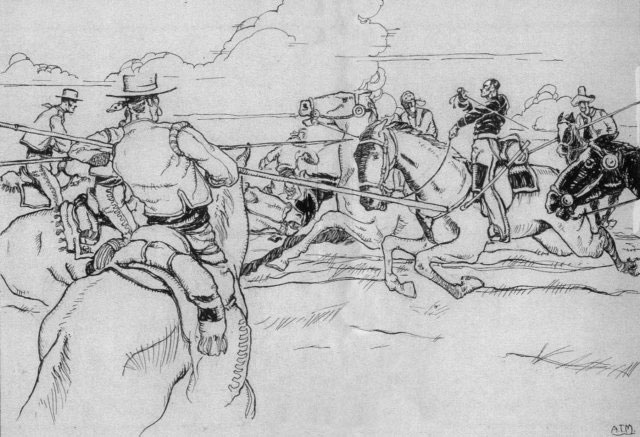
Captain Archibald H. Gillespie of the United States Marine Corps was attacked by lancers, front and rear, at San Pasqual

As the leading element of the U.S. force's attack drew close to a Kumeyaay village, the Californios wheeled back and fired their few firearms. At this time Captain Johnston was killed by a bullet. Pico then withdrew a half mile to higher ground.

A second charge ordered by Capt. Benjamin D. Moore further separated the Americans, and the Californios met his dragoons with a counter-charge by lancers. The charge was quickly surrounded, and Capt. Moore was killed. Gillespie arrived within fifteen minutes with the artillery. Mules are reluctant to wheel, and the horse-mounted Californios outflanked the Americans and captured one of the unattended howitzers. Gillespie used a sabre to fight off a vicious personal attack made by a group of lancers in revenge for his previous actions during his occupation of Los Angeles and the broken agreement to cease hostilities. He took a lance thrust just over the heart that pierced a lung. Kearny was wounded when he was lanced. Other U.S. dragoons were worked on by pairs of Californios who, with fresh mounts and years of practice, would use a lasso to yank soldiers off their mounts to the ground, where the second rider would lance them. Gillespie's men unlimbered the remaining howitzer – John Sutter's Russian-made bronze four-pounder – and were able to drive the Californio fighters from the field after Midshipman Duncan fired canister into them. Either this action (traditional U.S. view) or the unusual degree of bloodshed (traditional Californio view), prompted Pico to withdraw. The U.S. forces fortified a camp on a low hill north of the valley, initially placing their dead on mules that were unable to transport them before burying them outside of the camp under cover of darkness. The location of this camp is within the modern day San Diego Zoo Safari Park.

Summarizing the battle, historian Owen Coy writes:

The Americans fought bravely against heavy odds, for their mules were unmanageable, and their sabers too short to cope effectively with the long California lances.

Coy goes on to write:

The Americans were in no condition to pursue and indeed found themselves in a very unhappy plight.

== After the battle ==
=== Six messengers ===
The next day, December 7, 1846, after assurances by Dr. Griffin that the worst of the injured could be moved, Captain Turner, now in command of the Dragoons, since Kearny was wounded, marched the column toward San Diego. Californio lancers established a blocking position near what is now known as "Mule Hill". Captain Turner ordered Lieutenant William H. Emory and a squad of dragoons to engage and drive off the menacing lancers. With dry powder in their carbines, the dragoons easily forced the lancers away, while inflicting five dead among the fleeing Californios. That evening, Captain Turner, established a strong defensive perimeter and then sent dispatches requesting urgent reinforcements, carried to Commodore Stockton by "Alexis Godey, Thomas Burgess, and one other." On December 8, there still had been no word from the three messengers, when suddenly there appeared a white flag from the Californios. The Lancers wished to trade "four Americans whom [they] wished to exchange for four Californians. This was embarrassing, because the Americans had but one man, Pablo Vejar, as a prisoner." With the trade completed, it was learned from the returned men that Stockton had no horses and therefore could not send a relief party. Prior to capture by the Californios on their return trip, they had hid Stockton's message under a tree, "but when this cache was examined the letters were missing." With Kearny somewhat recovering from his wounds, he regained the command from Turner, and Kearny determined to dispatch another detail to San Diego. On the evening of the 8th, Beale and Carson volunteered for the mission, however General Kearny wanted to retain Carson with the command in case he was needed. Lieut. Beale explained to Kearny that the dispatches might not make it through to San Diego without Kit Carson's experience. That night Lieut. Beale, Scout Carson, and an Indian guide named Pontho moved under cover of darkness, taking different routes to the commodore's headquarters at San Diego, 28 miles (45 km) to the south-southwest. For Kit Carson and Pontho (or Panto) the foot journey to San Diego was "a matter of routine." But "to the young naval officer it was pure torture, and upon his arrival at old town [San Diego], being unable to stand because of his lacerated feet, he had to be carried into Commodore Stockton's headquarters." To insure that at least one messenger would make it through, the three men had separated a few miles from San Diego, Pontho (Panto) was the first to make it, then followed Carson, then later the much suffering naval officer Lieut. Beale.

== Reinforcement and casualties ==
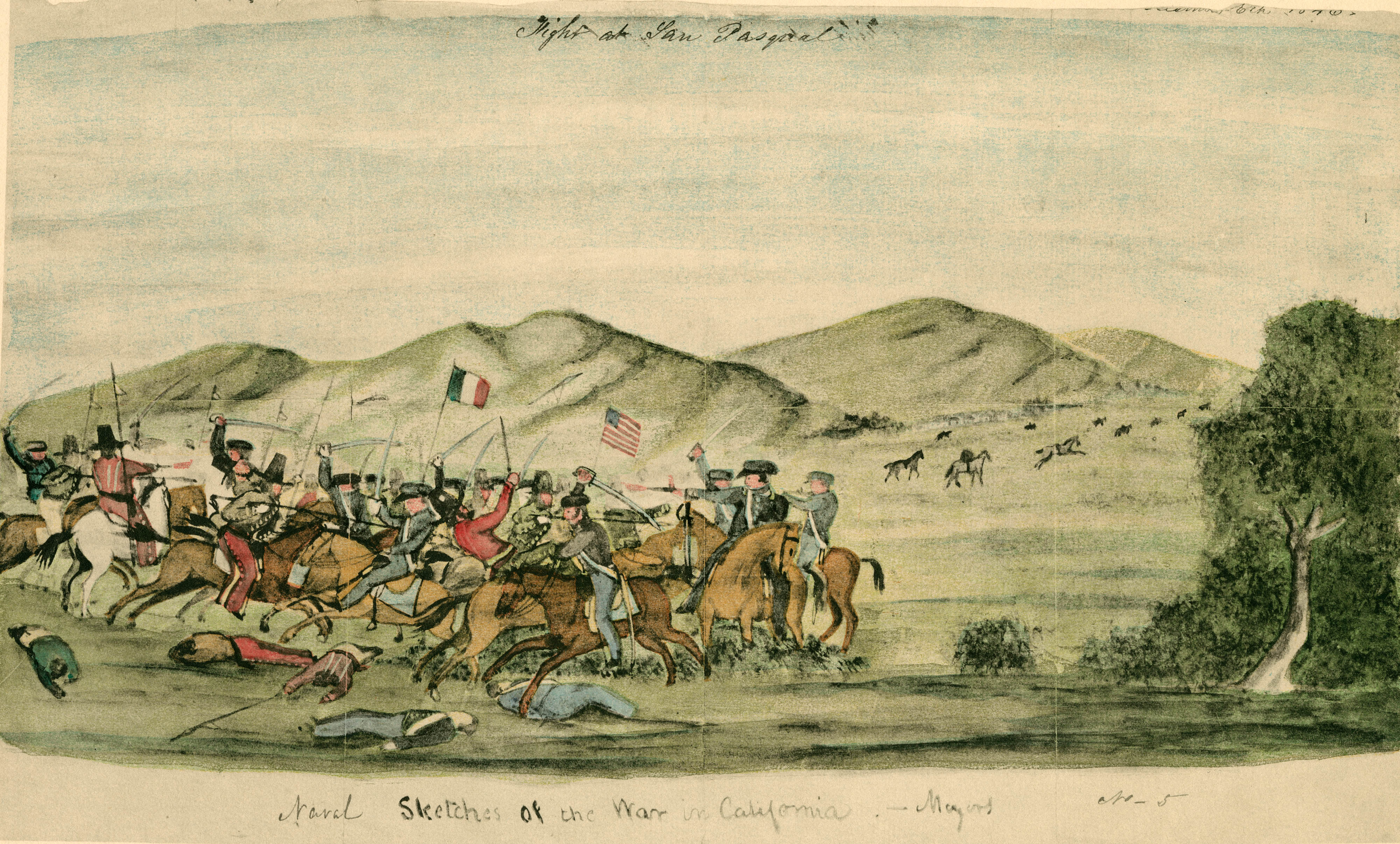
Depiction of the battle by William H. Meyers; watercolor, 1847.

Stockton quickly dispatched a unit of over 200 sailors and marines, whose arrival caused the Californios to disperse. Kearny had already determined the night before (December 9) to continue the march the next morning. On December 10th, Sergeant Cox died of wounds sustained during the battle, and was buried at the base of Mule Hill. Stockton's unit, after reaching Mule Hill, then escorted Kearny's battered troops to San Diego, where they arrived December 12.

Dr. John S. Griffin, Kearny's surgeon, reported that the Americans had lost 17 killed and 18 wounded out of the 50 officers and men who engaged Pico's lancers. When they arrived in San Diego, the wounded survivors were treated by their Californio guide's sister, Nurse Juanita Machado Alipas de Wrightington, known as the Florence Nightingale of San Diego for her charity work for the oppressed native peoples camped outside San Diego.

=== Killed/Missing in action of U.S. 1st Dragoon & attached forces ===
- Company C:
- Sgt. Cox, John (Died of Wounds December 10, 1846)
- Cpl. West, William
- Pvt. Ashmead, George
- Pvt. Campbell, Joseph, T.
- Pvt. Dalton, William
- Pvt. Dunlap, John
- Pvt. Kennedy, Joseph, B. (Died of Wounds December 21, 1846)
- Pvt. Leckey, William, B.
- Pvt. Repose, Samuel, T.
- Company K:
- 1SG. Moore, Otis, L.
- Sgt. Whitress, William
- Cpl. Ramsdale, George
- Farrier. Johnson, David, W.
- Pvt. Fiel, William, H.
- Pvt. Gholston, William, C.
- Pvt. Gregory, Robert, S.
- Pvt. McCaffrey, Hugh (Missing In Action)

1st U.S. Dragoon Officers:

- CPT. Johnston, Abraham-1st Dragoon Staff officer
- CPT. Moore, Benjamin-'C' Company commander
- 2LT. Hammond, Thomas-'K' Company commander
- Attached:
- California Volunteer. Baker, Henry
- Mountain man. Menard, Francois (Listed as Topographical Engineer in some listings)

=== California Lancers at San Pasqual Battle ===
- Aguilar, Jose
- Alipas, Dionisio
- Alipas, Jose
- Alvarado, Jose, Maria
- Apis, Pablo, Alvarado, Juan
- Canedo, Salvador (or Felipe)
- Carrillo, Ramon
- Casimiro, Rubio
- Cota, Leonardo (Lieutenant)
- Duarte, Jose
- Garcia, Gabriel
- Gregorio, Santiago
- Higuera, Francisco
- Ibarra, Jose, Maria
- Lara, Francisco, Dorio
- Lobo, Santiago
- Lopez, Cristobal
- Machado, Jesus
- Manriquez, Juan
- Mariano, Juan, Lobo
- Moreno, Juan, Bautista (Listed as a Captain in some reports)
- Olivares, Isidoro
- Osuna, Leandro
- Osuna, Ramon
- Peralta, Rafael (or Felipe)
- Perez, Pedro
- Pico, Andres (General)
- Rios, Silverio
- Sanchez, Tomas (Lieutenant)
- Serrano, Jose, Antonio
- Valenzuela, Joaquin
- Vejar, Pablo (Captured during the battle; prisoner exchanged for: Burgess, Godey, and Delaware Indian Scout)
- Verdugo, Pedro (or Miguel)
- Yorba, Domingo
- Yorba, Jose Antonio III
- Young, Romualdo

=== Assessment ===
General Kearny's official report states: "On the morning of the 7th, having made ambulances for our wounded . . . we proceeded on our march, when the enemy showed himself, occupying the hills in our front, which they left as we approached, till reaching San Bernardo a party of them took possession of a hill near to it and maintained their position until attacked by our advance, who quickly drove them from it, killing and wounding five of their number with no loss on our part." Some time after the battle, General Kearny wrote that the U.S. had achieved victory since the Californios had "fled the field," but the Californios saw the engagement as their victory.

According to Kit Carson, who was on the battlefield that day, "Kearny chose to press the attack with an eye to capturing Pico's horses."

With the conclusion of the fight at San Pasqual, San Diego and "all of California north of Santa Barbara were in American hands. Only Los Angeles and its immediate environs were still under control of the Californios."

The battle is unique, as it was one of the few military battles in the United States history, that involved elements of the Army, Navy, Marines, and civilian volunteers, all in the same skirmish. During the late 19th and early 20th centuries, historians debated which force won or lost the battle. Clearly, Kearny retained the battle area, the ability to operate and maneuver, and also the initiative, though his losses were significantly higher; however, he did not implement his battle plan, his ammunition was compromised, and he outran his artillery and support. Many, including some historians, have described the result of the battle as a pyrrhic victory.

However historian Geoffrey Regan gives a different assessment:

It had been a thoroughly bad battle from the American point of view. It has been claimed in Kearny's defense that because Pico abandoned the field the Americans were thereby victorious, but it is a ridiculous assertion.

Historian Lt. Colonel Cory Hollon cited Kearny's misjudgments: the battle was arguably unnecessary; the operating environment disadvantaged Kearny; he was unaware, or possibly misinformed, (Note: Kearny was misinformed, first by Carson and his dispatches, then later by Capt. Gillespie (USMC), when Kearny linked up with him in California: Near Socorro, New Mexico, General Kearny "met Kit Carson, with an escort of fifteen men, carrying dispatches from Stockton and Fremont in Los Angeles. Carson, who had heard nothing of the [Calif] revolt that broke out immediately after his departure, reported that everything was quiet in California and that American authority was supreme. Kearny there upon decided to retain but 100 of his Dragoons and to send the others back to Santa Fe. As Carson had just travelled the Gila River route, and as Fitzpatrick had never been on it, Kearny ordered the former to return toward the west as guide to the expedition. Carson protested but followed orders. The dispatches carried thus far by Carson were turned over to Fitzpatrick, with orders to take them to Washington." Hafen p. 240) about the character of the threat; Kearny overestimated or misused his friendly forces; and Kearny culminated at San Pasqual because he had overextended his supply chain, resulting in a poorly prepared force facing an underestimated enemy. Hollon states that Kearny's misjudgments resulted in nearly disastrous consequences for the Army of the West and put the United States’ plans for conquest and empire in peril. Historian Arthur Woodward wrote, "One can only suppose that Kearny, having made one of the longest marches in the history of the United States Army, was spoiling for a fight and intended to have it."

In late December 1846, Kearny's force began its march to Los Angeles. It consisted of a mixed force of Army dragoons, Navy sailors, Marines, volunteers and artillery. Although there was contention on leadership of U.S. forces in California, this and Stockton's combined forces went on to engage the Californios at the Battle of Rio San Gabriel, resulting in a Californio retreat. The following day the Battle of La Mesa resulted in another Californio defeat, leading to the surrender of the Pueblo de Los Ángeles and later the signing of the Treaty of Cahuenga. Historian Hollon wrote:

The combat losses at the Battle of San Pasqual often overshadow the success of the overall campaign. While Kearny made a poor decision to engage the Californios at San Pasqual, the operations on either side of the battle revealed a brilliant military mind coordinating complex actions across the expanse of a continent.

== Legacy ==
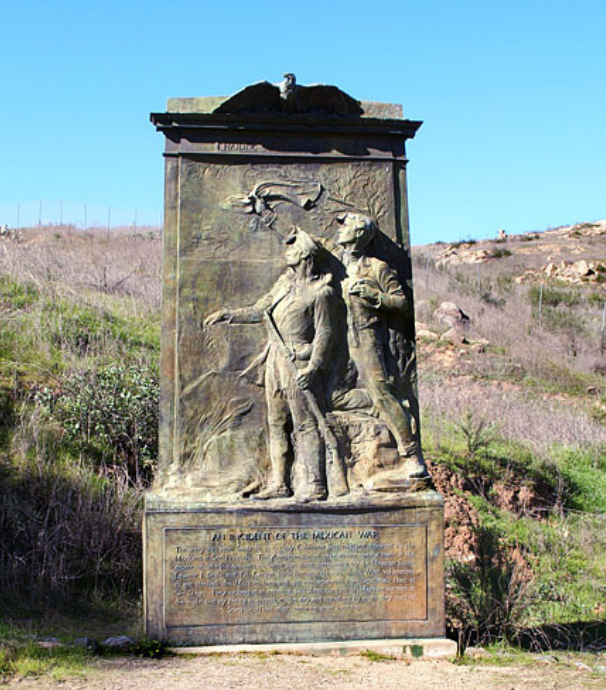
The San Pasqual Battlefield Monument, sculpted in 1910 by Isidore Konti.

- Fort Moore was constructed on North Hill Street in downtown Los Angeles, California, originally as an improvised defensive position used by Lt. Gillespie, in honor of Captain Benjamin D. Moore. The Fort Moore Hill Pioneer Memorial further honors Moore and other American pioneers.
- Kearny Mesa, an area of San Diego, was named after Camp Kearny; Camp Kearny was named for Stephen W. Kearny.
- Kit Carson Park, in Escondido, was named for Kit Carson.
- Beale Air Force Base in Marysville, California, was named after Edward Beale, keeping the name of its World War II era army base Camp Beale.
- Camp Gillespie, completed in 1942 during World War II, was named in honor of Lieutenant Archibald Gillespie. In 1944 the federal government transferred the property to the County of San Diego. It rechristened the facility as Gillespie Field, since used as a municipal airport.
- The site of the battle is commemorated as San Pasqual Battlefield State Historic Park.
- A cross was placed on Battle Mountain in Rancho Bernardo, which has been incorrectly identified as Mule Hill, commemorating the battle. Raised in Easter 1966, it was later dedicated to local residents who died during the Tenerife airport disaster.
- A bronze relief of Beale and Carson contacting Stockton was unveiled at the National Museum in 1910.
- The battle was dramatized in the 1927 film California, which starred Tim McCoy as Captain Gillespie.
- In 1931, Joseph Leland Roop created a diorama depicting the battle for the Los Angeles Natural History Museum.
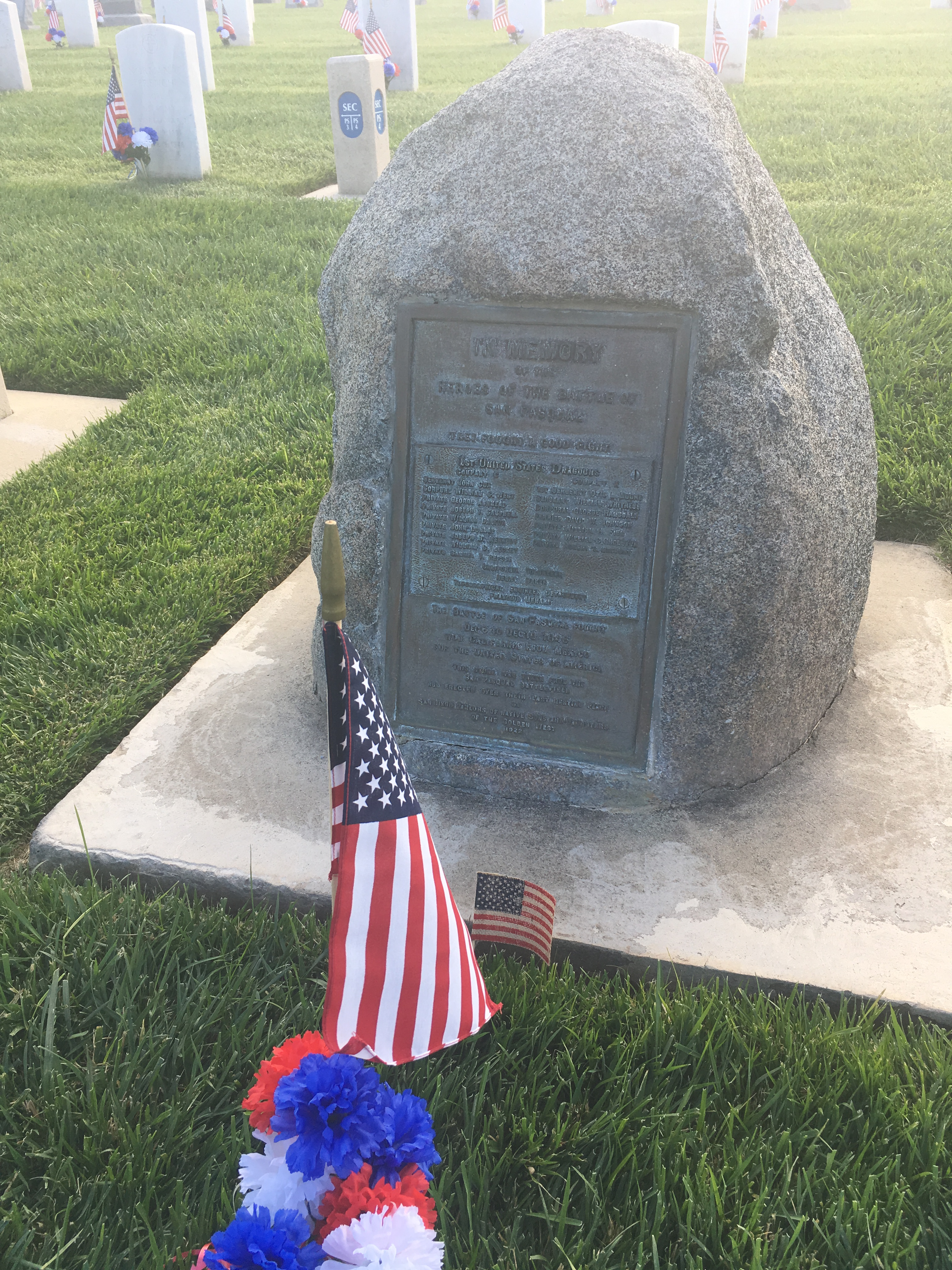
Marker of reburied U.S. servicemen who died during the Battle of San Pasqual at Fort Rosecrans National Cemetery

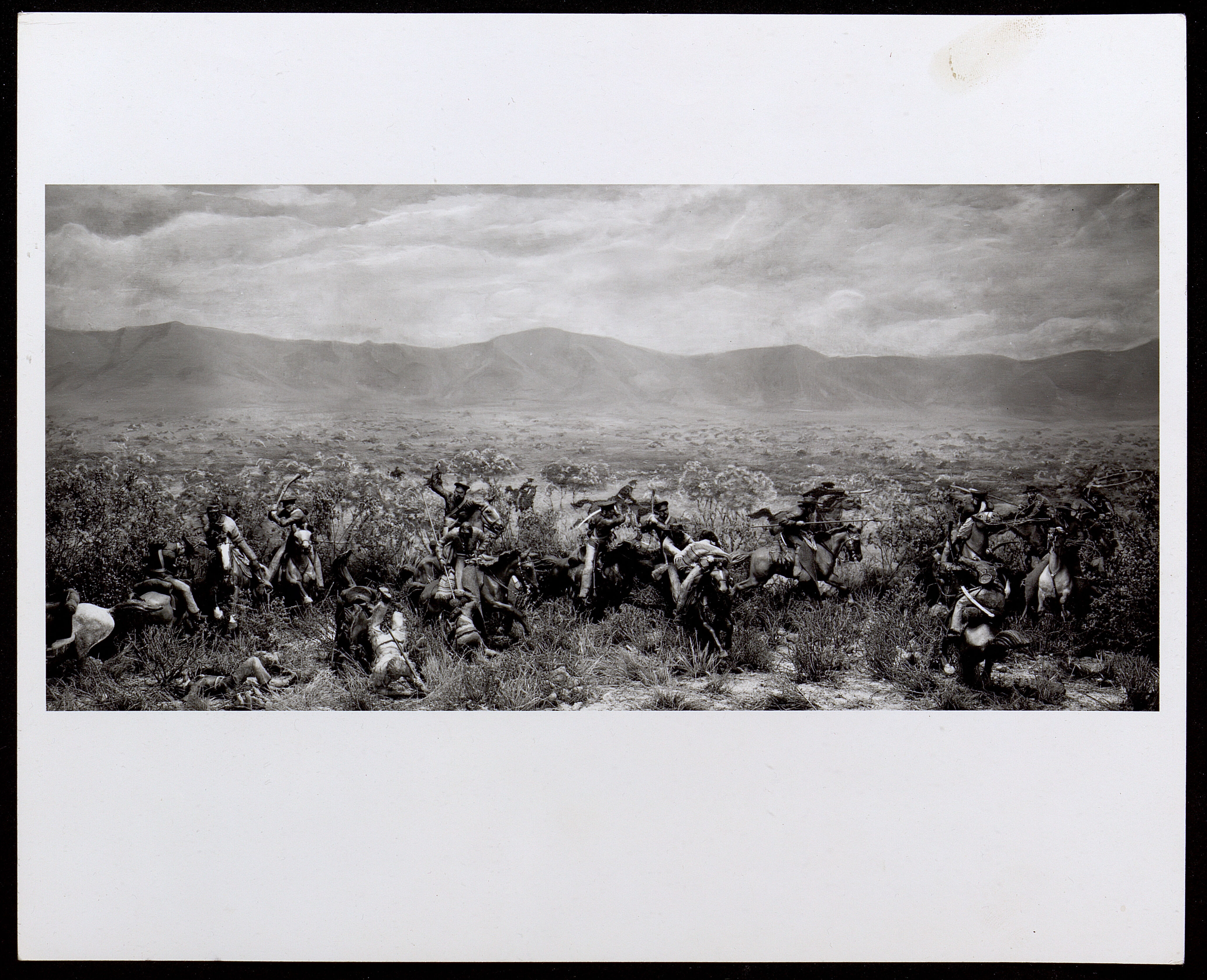
Diorama depicting the 1846 Battle of San Pasqual, by artist Joseph Leland Roop in 1931, at the Natural History Museum, Los Angeles

== See also ==
- List of conflicts in the United States
- Battles of the Mexican–American War
- History of San Diego
- Pauma Massacre
- Temecula Massacre

== Sources ==
- Briggs, Carl and Trudell, Clyde Frances (1983). Quarterdeck & Saddlehorn: The Story of Edward F. Beale 1822–1893. The Arthur H. Clarke Company, Glendale. California.
- Clarke, Dwight L. and Ruhlen, George (March 1964). "The Final Roster of the Army of the West, 1846-1847". The California Historical Society Quarterly. pp. 37-44.
- Coy, Owen C. (1921). The Battle of San Pasqual. Sacramento: California State Printing Office.
- Coy, Owen C, PHD, Director (1921). "The Battle of San Pasqual: A Report of the California Historical Survey Commission with Special Reference to Its Location". California State Printing Office Sacramento.
- Downey, Joseph T., Ordinary Seaman, USN; Lamar, Howard, Editor (1963-Reissued). The Cruise of the Portsmouth, 1845-1847; A Sailor's View of the Naval Conquest of California, Yale University Press.
- Emory, W. H., Brevet Major; Calvin, Ross, Ph.D. (Introduction and notes) (1951). Lieutenant Emory REPORTS: A Reprint of Lieutenant W. H. Emory's NOTES OF A MILITARY RECONNOISSANCE, From Fort Leavenworth, in Missouri to San Diego, California. New York: Published by H. Long & Brother. 1848.
- Gorenfeld, Will and Gorenfeld, John (2016). Kearny's Dragoons Out West, The Birth of the U.S. Cavalry. University of Oklahoma Press.
- Griffin, John, S., Ames, George, Walcott (Introduction and notes), and a foreword by Lyman, George D. (1943). A Doctor Comes to California; The Diary of John S. Griffin, Assistant Surgeon with Kearny's Dragoons, 1846-1847. San Francisco Historical Society, MCMXLIII.
- Hafen, Leroy R. The Life of Thomas Fitzpatrick Mountain Man, Guide and Indian Agent. The Old West Publishing Company. 1973
- Hayes, Benjamin, (Judge). (1877). William Burden Dunne's Notes on San Pascual.
- Marti, Werner H. (1960). Messenger of Destiny: The California Adventures, 1846–1847 of Archibald H. Gillespie, U.S. Marine Corps. John Howell-Books, 434 Post Street, San Francisco.
- Myers, Harry C. (Editor). (1982). From the Post of the Frontier; Letters of Thomas and Charlotte Swords. Published by Sekan Publications, 2210 S. Main, Fort Scott, KS 66701.
- Peet, Mary, Rockwood (1949). San Pasqual, A Crack in the Hills. The Highland Press, Culver City, California.
- Roberts, Elizabeth, Judson (1917). Indian Stories of the Southwest. San Francisco Harr Wagner Publishing Co.
- Turner, Henry, Smith, Edited & Introduction by Clarke, Dwight, L. (1966). The Original Journals of Henry Smith Turner with Stephen Watts Kearny to New Mexico and California 1846–1847. University of Oklahoma Press: Norman.
- Woodward, Arthur (1948). Lances at San Pascual. San Francisco: California Historical Society. Reprinted with additions, from California Historical Society Quarterly Vol. XXV, Number 4 and Vol. XXVI, Number 1.
