= San Pasqual Battlefield State Historic Park =

California State Historic Park

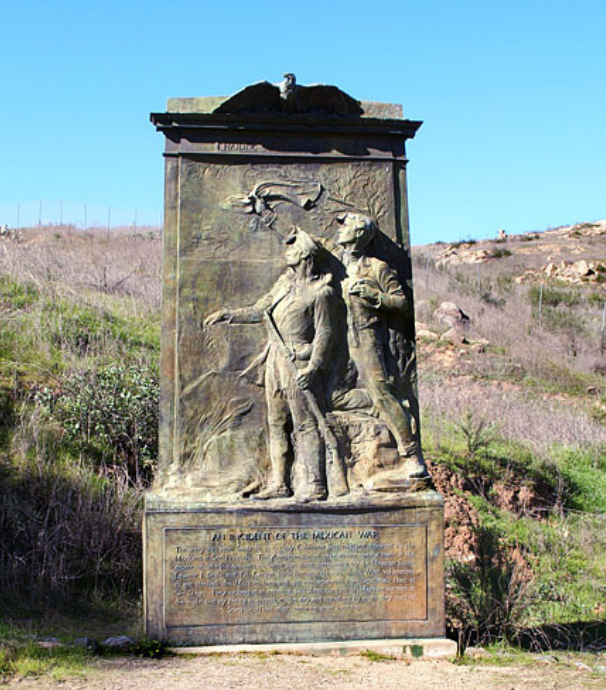
- San Pasqual Battlefield Monument
- Interactive map of San Pasqual Battlefield State Historic Park
- Nearest city: Escondido, California
- Coordinates: 33°05′10″N 116°59′24″W
- Governing body: State of California

California Historical Landmark
- Reference no.: 533

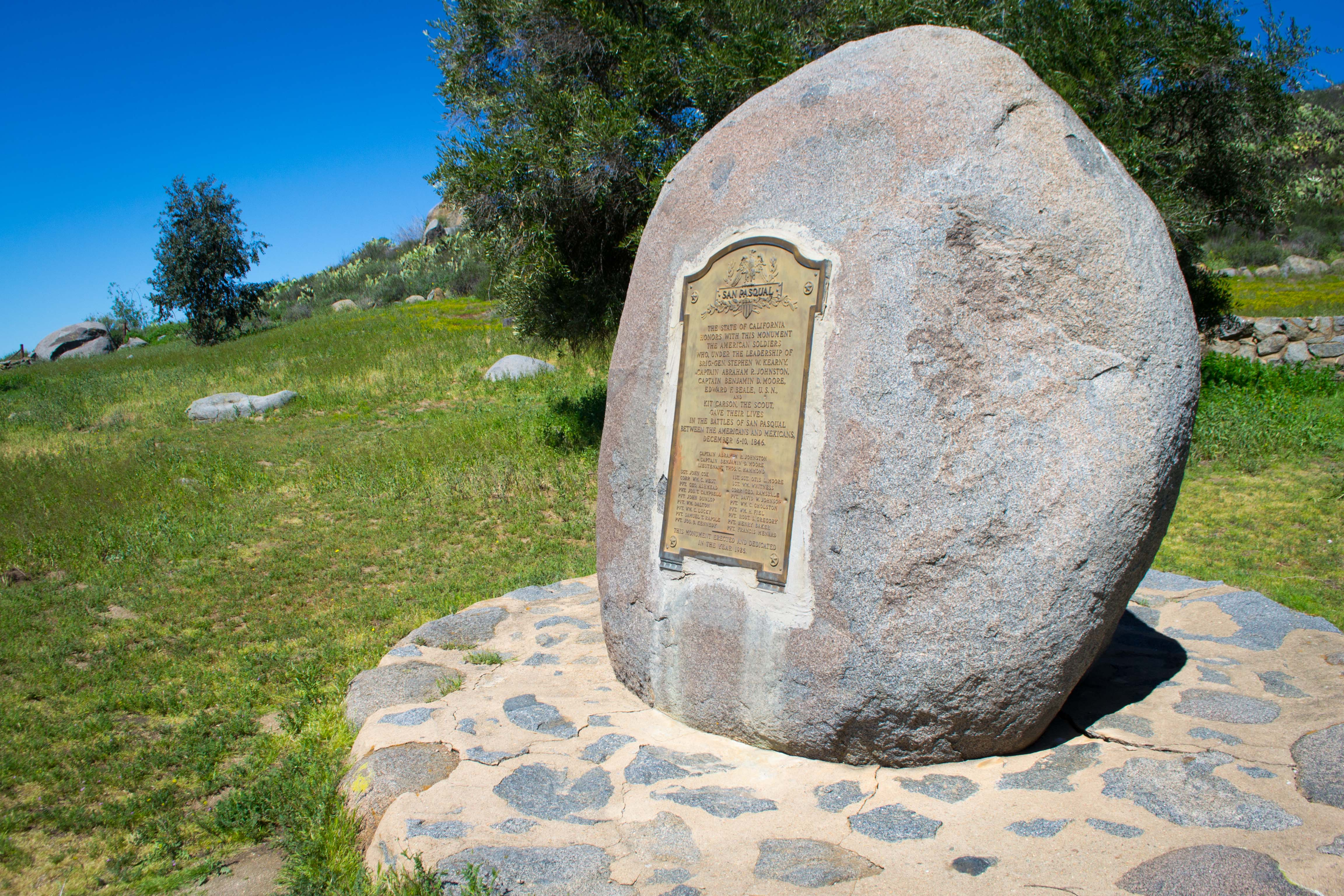
A plaque commemorates the Battle of San Pasqual

San Pasqual Battlefield State Historic Park honors the soldiers who fought in the 1846 Battle of San Pasqual, the bloodiest battle in California during the Mexican–American War. The battle was fought between United States troops under the command of General Stephen Kearny, and the Californio forces under the command of General Andres Pico on December 6, 1846.

The Native Sons of the Golden West were instrumental in raising money, preserving and ultimately creating the park which was then given to the state of California. It is now a California State Park as well as a California Historical Landmark. The 50-acre (200,000 m^{2}) park is next to the San Diego Zoo Safari Park, at San Pasqual Valley Road, south of Escondido, California, on Highway 78 in San Diego County.

The park is open only on weekends, and features a visitor center with displays about the cultural history of the San Pasqual Valley, exhibits, and a movie about the battle. Living history presentations are held at the park, with volunteers from the San Pasqual Battlefield Volunteer Association.
