= Godey =

Godey is a surname. Notable people with the surname include:

- Louis Antoine Godey (1804–1878), American editor and publisher
- Louis-Luc Godey (1813–1873), French mycologist
- Alexis Godey (1818-1889), frontiersman, scout, explorer

== See also ==
- Morton Freedgood (1913–2006), American author who wrote under the pen name John Godey
- Gode, Ethiopia
