= San Pasqual Battlefield Monument =

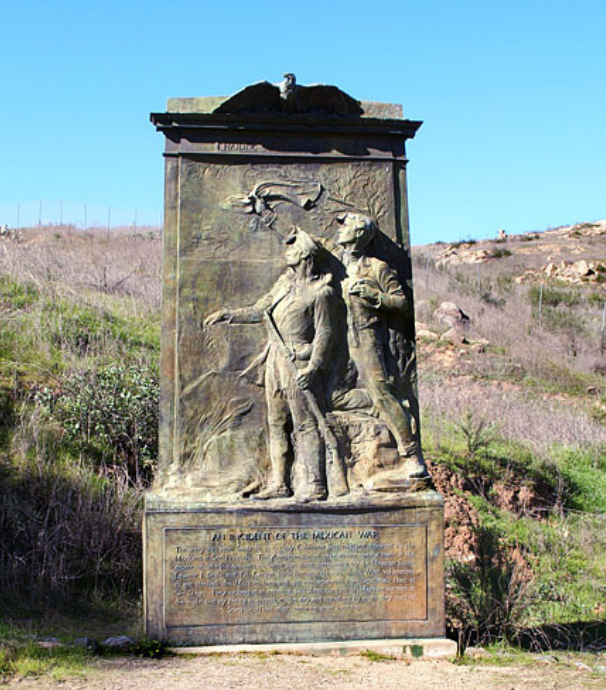
- Location: San Pasqual Battlefield State Historic Park, San Diego, California
- Designer: Isidore Konti
- Material: Bronze
- Completion date: 1910

The San Pasqual Battlefield Monument, also known as An Incident of the Mexican War, is a bronze relief sculpture in the San Pasqual Valley of San Diego, California, located at San Pasqual Battlefield State Historic Park. Sculpted by in 1910 by Isidore Konti, the monument commemorates the Battle of San Pasqual of 1846, part of the U.S. Conquest of California.

== History ==
The sculpture was designed by Isidore Konti and fabricated at the Gorham Foundry in New York. The monument was commissioned as a gift to the Smithsonian Institution, by Californian diplomat Truxtun Beale, son of General Edward Fitzgerald Beale, a veteran of the American Conquest of California who distinguished himself in the 1846 Battle of San Pasqual and came to be known as the "Hero of San Pasqual". Senator George C. Perkins spoke at the dedication ceremony for the sculpture at the Smithsonian in 1910.

The sculpture was displayed in the entry foyer of the Smithsonian's National Museum of Natural History in Washington, D.C. until the museum was renovated in the 1970s, after which it was placed in storage at the Smithsonian Archives. In 1974, following lobbying from local authorities in San Diego County, including Representative Clair Burgener, the Smithsonian gifted the sculpture to the city of Escondido, California, in anticipation of the United States Bicentennial in 1976. The sculpture was later moved to its current location at San Pasqual Battlefield State Historic Park, in the San Pasqual Valley.
