= Geoffrey Regan =

British writer and teacher (1946–2005)

- Born: Geoffrey Bernard Regan; 15 July 1946
- Died: 28 March 2005 (aged 58)
- Education: University of Kent: M.A.
- Alma mater: University of London: PGCE (1972)
- Occupation: author
- Website: thehistorian.co.uk at the Wayback Machine (archived 4 February 2005)

Geoffrey Bernard Regan (15 July 1946 – 28 March 2005) was an English author of popular history, senior school teacher and broadcaster. He authored books focused on military failures, and wrote for newspapers and periodicals such as USA Today and History Today.

== Education and career ==
Regan attended Sunbury Grammar School from 1957 onwards, University of Kent from 1965–1970, receiving his B.A. and M.A., and took his Postgraduate Certificate in Education at University of London in 1972. He taught at senior school level from 1971 through to 1990. He lived in Surrey, England.

== Reception ==
Kirkus Reviews, describing Regan as author of "numerous popular military histories", wrote that Lionhearts "shines a soft, flattering light" on the warring leaders Saladin and Richard I, and scarcely condemns atrocities against captives.

A review of Great Military Disasters in the U.S. Air Force's Air Power Journal referred to it as "in depth"; the author's "historical perspective demonstrates the usefulness of studying history to gain insight, temper judgement, and train the mind". The St. Louis Post-Dispatch stated that with the book's "melancholy roll-call of failure, the student of military history might well wonder how anybody wins".

Fight or Flight was described in its 1996 Air Power Journal review as "readable, well organized, and extremely accessible", and "with an increasing number of military books dealing with technology, [...], it is refreshing to find a book that emphasizes the one element found in all combat – people."

== Works ==
He published more than 40 books, including:

- Great Military Disasters: A Historical Survey of Military Incompetence 1988. ISBN 978-0871315373
- The Guinness Book of Military Blunders Guinness. 1991. ISBN 978-0851129617
- Fight or Flight 1996. ISBN 978-0380780198
- Lionhearts: Saladin, Richard I, and the Era of the Third Crusade 1999. ISBN 978-0802713544
- Backfire: A History of Friendly Fire 1999. ISBN 978-0788161216
- Great Military Blunders 2000, ISBN 978-0752218984. Regan was the Series Consultant for the Channel Four television series Great Military Blunders
- Naval Blunders 2000. ISBN 978-1574882537
- Royal Blunders 2004. ISBN 978-0233050447
- Battles That Changed History 2006. ISBN 978-1844421787
- First Crusader: Byzantium's Holy Wars 2003. ISBN 978-1403961518
