= Isidore Konti =

American sculptor

Konti, circa 1905

Isidore Konti (July 9, 1862 – January 11, 1938) was a Vienna-born (of Hungarian parents) sculptor. He began formal art studies at the age of 16 when he entered the Imperial Academy in Vienna, where he studied under Edmund von Hellmer. In 1886, he won a scholarship that allowed him to study in Rome for two years. While there he developed a love of Renaissance art that was to affect the nature of his mature sculpture. Upon returning to Austria, Konti worked as an architectural modeler.

In 1890, 1891 or 1892 (depending on the source) Konti moved, permanently as it turned out, to America, there going straight to Chicago, where he began working on sculptural decorations for the 1893 World's Columbian Exposition. When the work there was completed, he moved to New York City and commenced working as an assistant for fellow Austrian expatriate Karl Bitter. Konti's skills as a modeler kept him in much demand—for the 1900 Pan-American Exposition in Buffalo, New York; for the 1904 Louisiana Purchase Exposition in St. Louis; and for the 1915 Panama Pacific Exposition in San Francisco. In 1906 he was elected into the National Academy of Design as an Associate member and became a full Academician in 1909.

Konti died in Yonkers, New York on January 11, 1938.

== Architectural sculpture ==
Like many sculptor of that epoch Konti created architectural sculpture. His works in this arena include:

- Tympanum, Grace Chapel, New York City, 1894. (Note: Presumably the sculpture in tympanum above front door in this photo and in closer view, although this is another tympanum sculpture at the church.)
- Spandrel figures, the Elbridge Gerry Mansion, New York City, 1895.
- Three Graces (for which Audrey Munson served as the model) Hotel Astor, New York City, 1907.
- Frieze: “A Festival Procession of the Arts,” Gainsborough Studios, 222 Central Park South, New York City, 1908.
- Statues of Justinian and Alfred the Great, Cuyahoga County Courthouse, Cleveland, Ohio, 1910.
  - Twelve statues: Herbert Adams, Daniel Chester French, and Herman Matzen each modeled two of the others. Karl Bitter modeled four of them.
- Capitals, panels and allegorical figures for the Pan-American Building, Washington D.C. 1910.

== Public monuments and fountains ==
- McKinley Memorial, Yonkers, New York 1906
- Mother and Child: the Bath, fountain in Katonah, New York, c. 1910
- San Pasqual Battlefield Monument, in San Diego, California
- Recumbent figure of Morgan Dix, Trinity Church, New York, 1915
- The Meeting of Air and Water, Gumbel Memorial Fountain, Audubon Park, New Orleans, Louisiana, 1919.
- A bequest from Sarah Lavinia Hyams funded two identical fountains, with sculpture groups and wading pools:
  - Hyams Memorial Fountain, Audubon Park, New Orleans, Louisiana, 1921.
  - Hyams Memorial Fountain, City Park, New Orleans, Louisiana, 1921.
- Sarcophagus for Bishop Horatio Potter, Cathedral of St. John the Divine, New York City, 1921.
- Yonkers World War I Memorial, Yonkers, NY, 1922.
- Edgar John Lownes Memorial, Swan Point Cemetery, Rhode Island, 1924
- Hudson - Fulton Monument, Yonkers, New York, 1924
- Spanish - American War Memorial, Yonkers, New York, 1928
- Lincoln Monument, Lincoln Park, Yonkers, New York, 1929
- Father Kelehan Memorial, St. Joseph's Cemetery, Yonkers, New York, 1929
- Governor Francis T. Nicholls, State Capitol Building, Baton Rouge, Louisiana 1931

Besides these works Isidore Konti produced numerous medals, plaques, figures and figurines that are today highly sought after by museums and collectors.

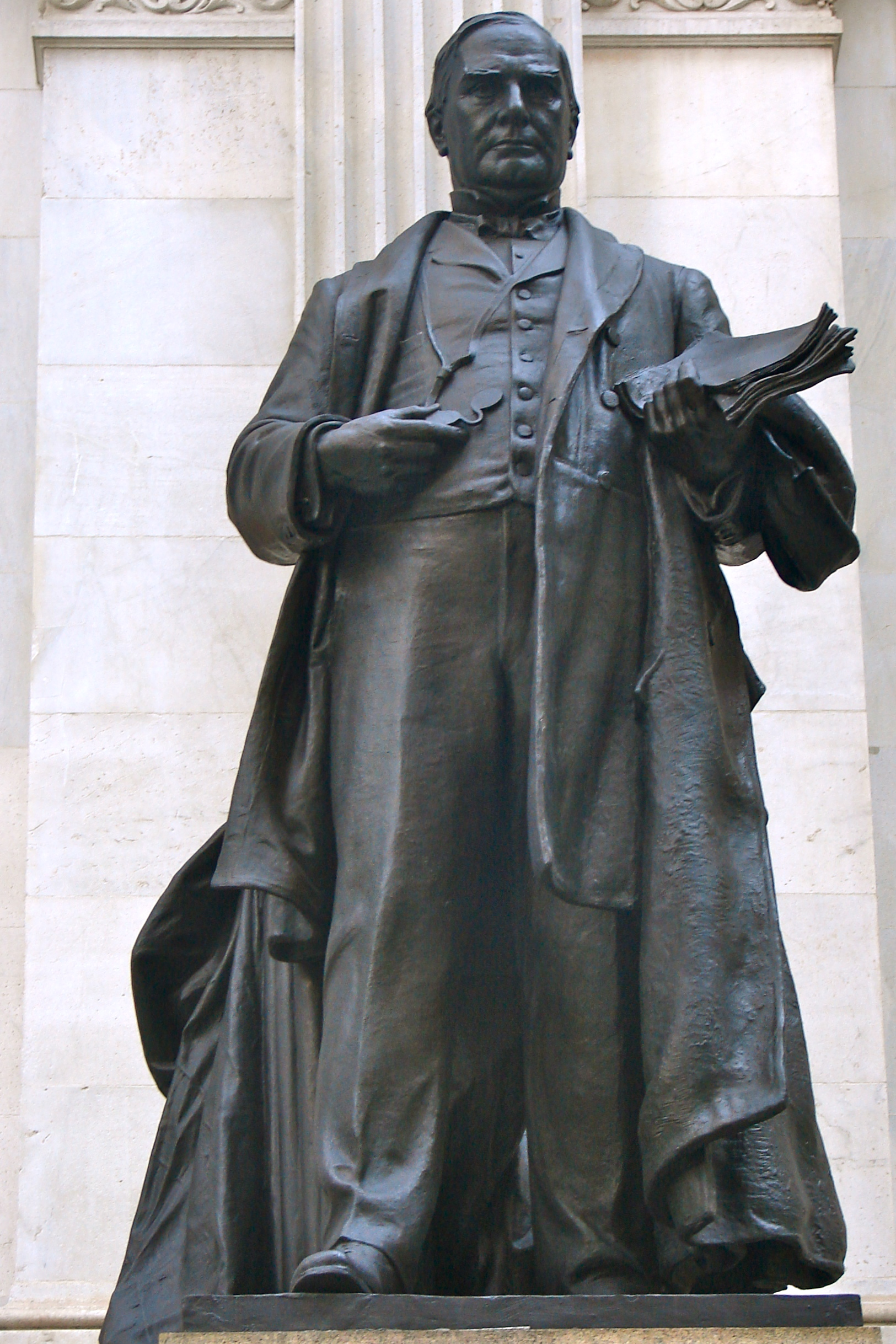
William McKinley (1908), City Hall, Philadelphia, Pennsylvania.

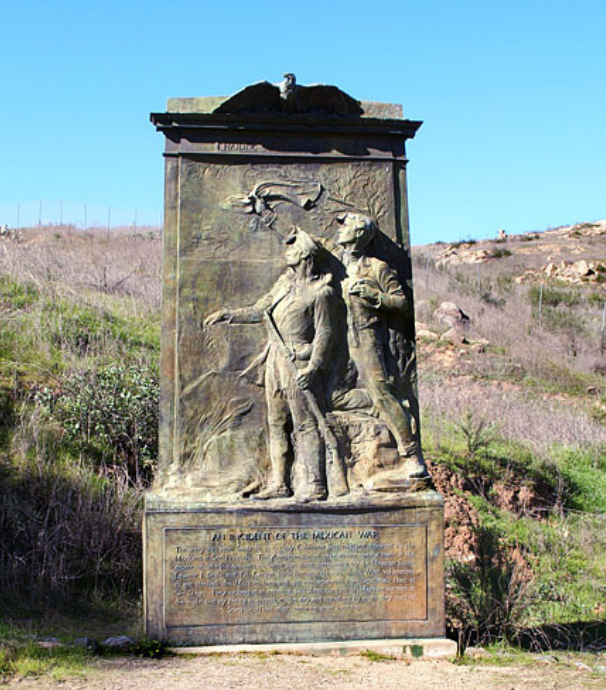
San Pasqual Battlefield Monument (1910), San Diego, California

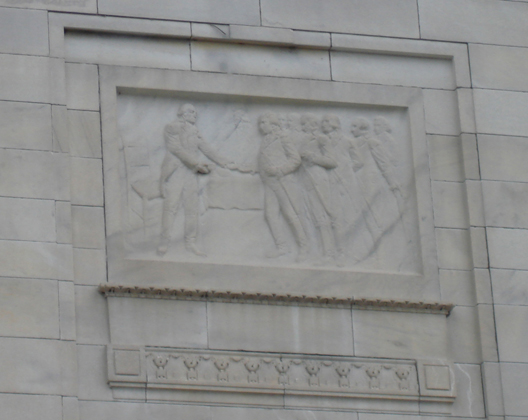
Meeting of Bolivar and San Martin (1910), Pan-American Building, Washington, D.C

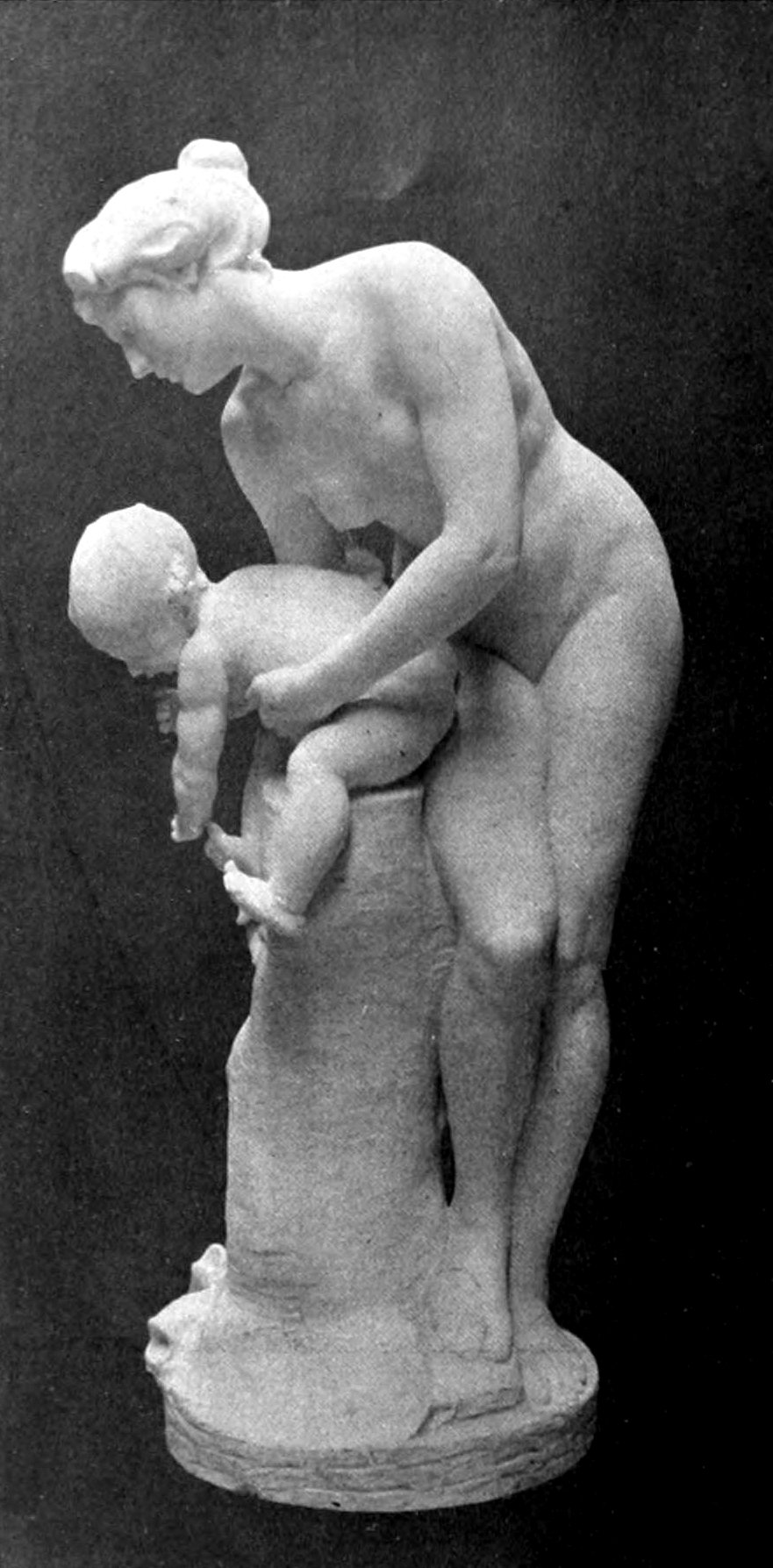
Mother and Child: the Bath (c. 1910), Katonah, New York.

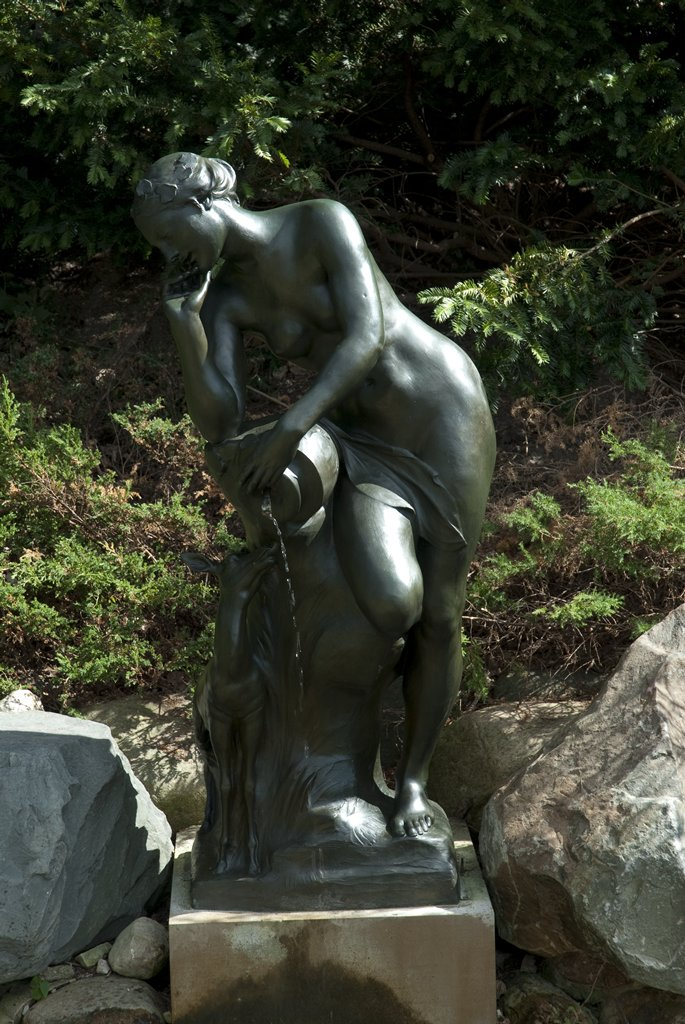
Nymph and Fawn (1917), Indianapolis Museum of Art.

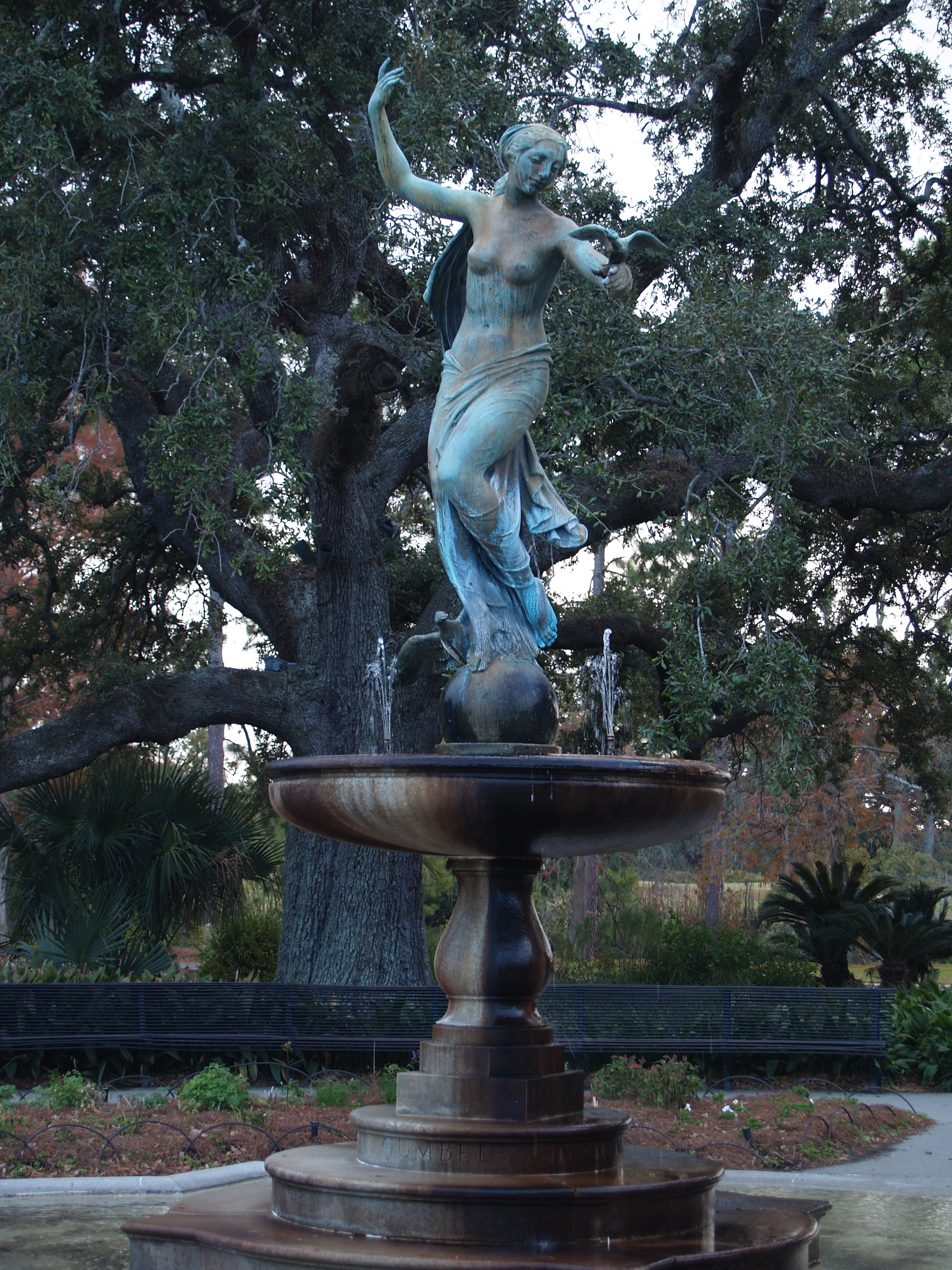
Gumbel Memorial Fountain (1919), Audubon Park, New Orleans, Louisiana.

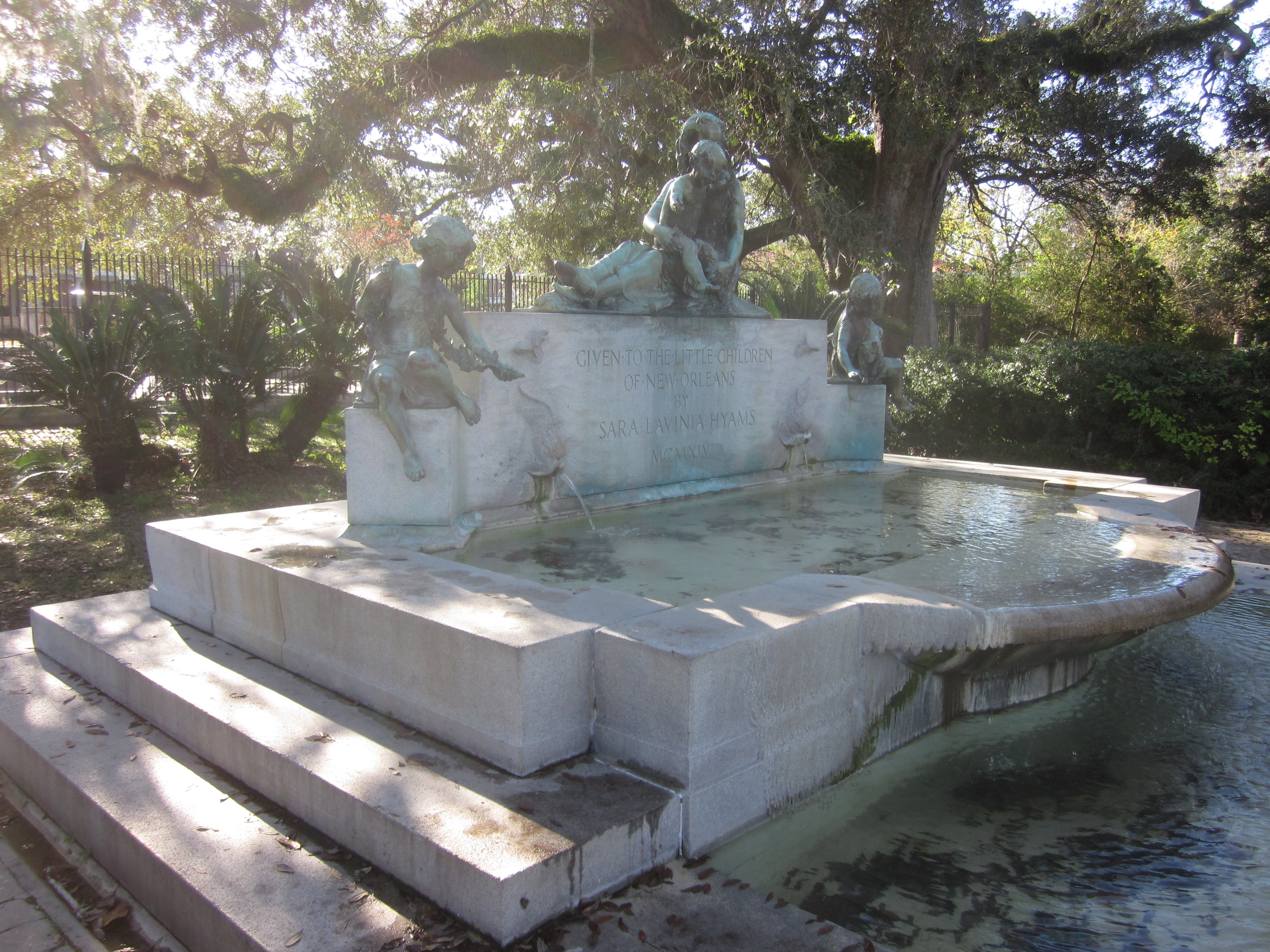
Hyams Memorial Fountain (1921), Audubon Park, New Orleans, Louisiana.

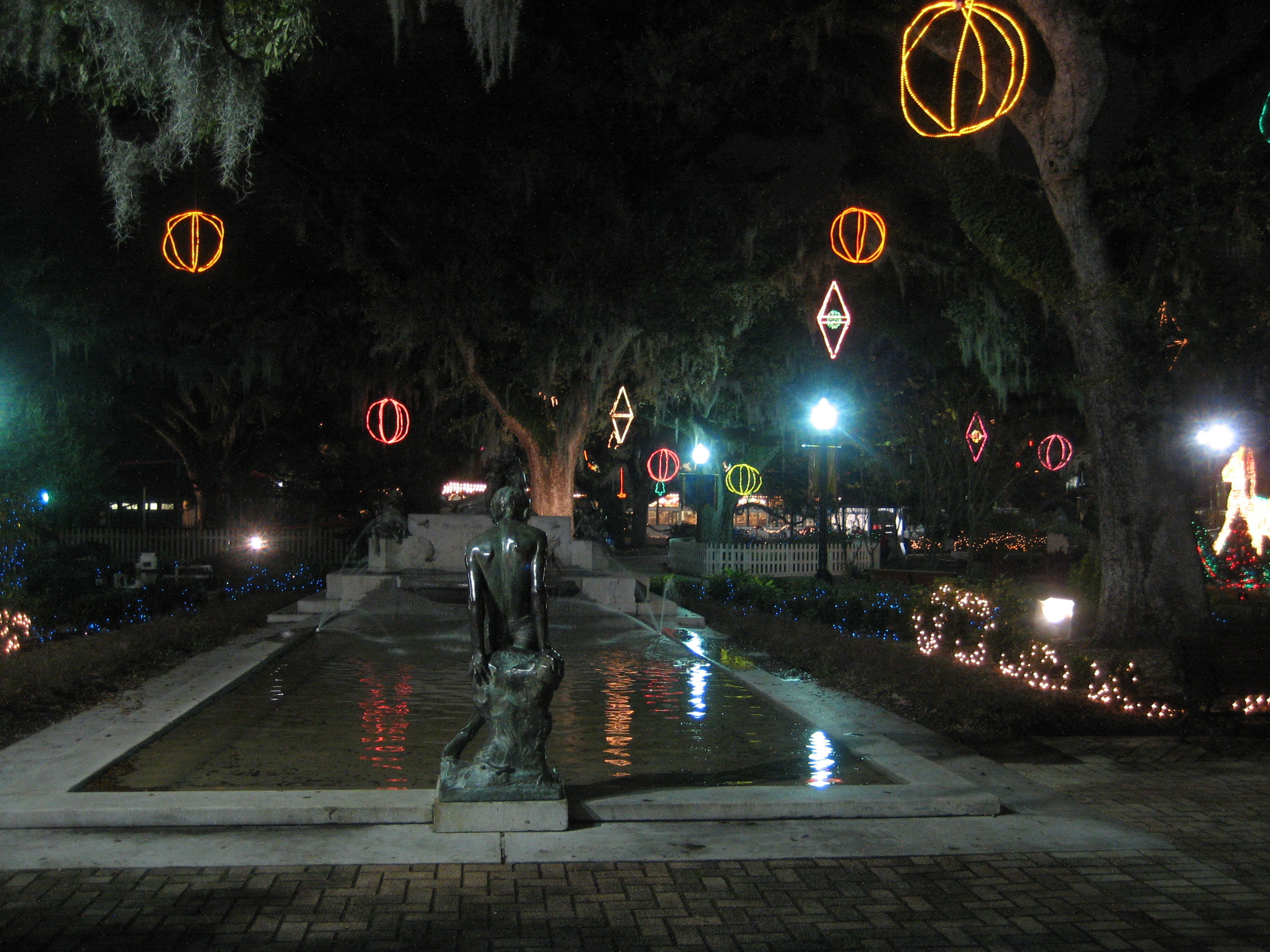
Hyams Memorial Fountain (1921), City Park, New Orleans, Louisiana

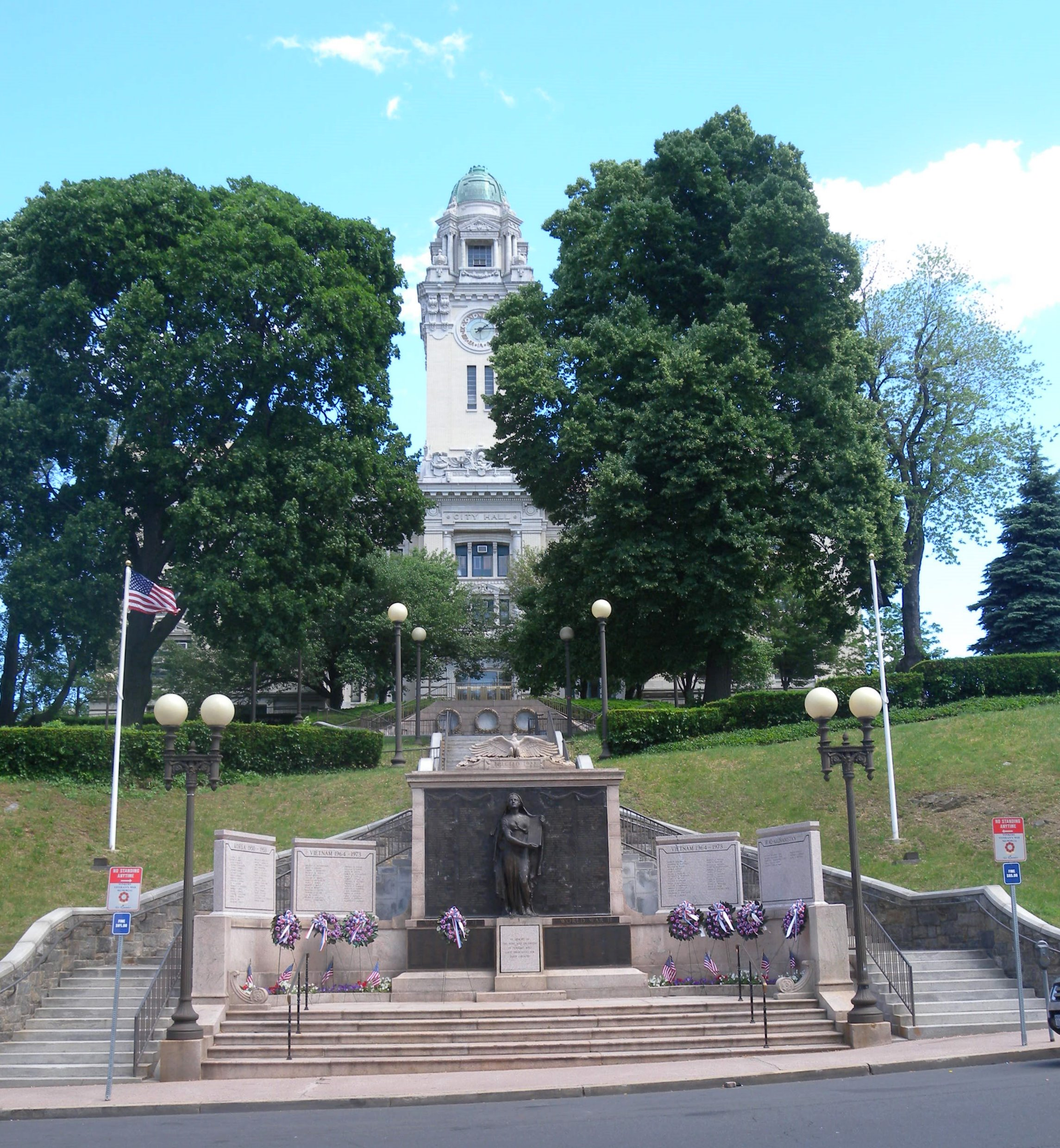
World War I Memorial (1922), City Hall, Yonkers, New York.

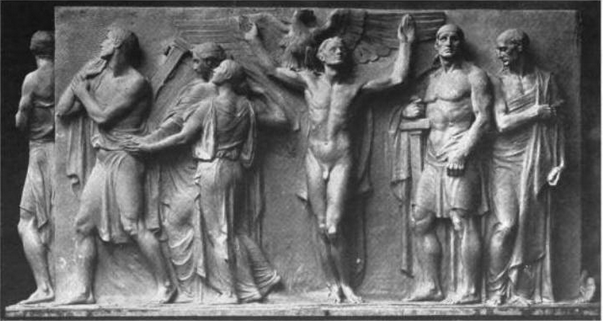
Detail of the columns of progress at the Panama Exposition (1915), San Francisco, California
