= Alexis Godey =

Scout and Mountain Man

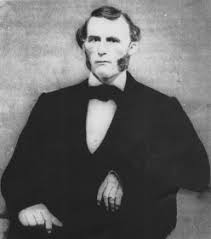
- Alexis Godey in 1870
- Born: Alexander Godey c. 1818; St. Louis, Missouri, US
- Died: January 19, 1889 (aged 70–71); Los Angeles, California, US
- Other names: Alec Godey and Alejandro Godey
- Occupations: Scout, frontiersman, explorer, rancher, miner, guide and an Indian agent
- Known for: Battle of San Pasqual, California Battalion and Expeditions with Frémont
- Spouse(s): Altagracia, Apolonia Calzadia, 3rd Soledad Cota (m.1849), 4th Maria Antonia Coronel (m.1863), 5th Maria Jimenez
- Children: 3

Alexis Godey Home
- Interactive map of Alexis Godey Home
- Location: 1414 19th Street Union Ave, Bakersfield, California
- Coordinates: 35.376319444°N 119.00820277°W

California Historical Landmark
- Official name: Alexis Godey Home
- Designated: July 31, 1959
- Reference no.: 690

Alexander "Alexis" Godey, also called Alec Godey and Alejandro Godey, was a trapper, scout, and mountain man. He was an associate of Jim Bridger and was lead scout for John C. Frémont.

== Biography ==
Godey was born in about 1818 in St. Louis, Missouri Territory. Although little is known about his early life, it is suspected that he was born to a French immigrant family from Canada. Godey's home at 414 19th Street West in Bakersfield, California is California Historical Landmark number 690. He sustained a long friendship with Jim Bridger, a fellow scout and mountain man.

== Career ==
Godey's reputation as a scout led him to be hired by explorer and military officer John C. Frémont. Godey was the lead scout for Frémont's second (1843–1844), third (1845), and fourth (1848–1849) California expeditions. Frémont wrote that Godey had been key for the success of his expeditions. Godey was instrumental in navigating the Kings River and San Joaquin Valley. This was especially important during the Conquest of California and the Bear Flag Rebellion.

== Bravery ==
On Frémont's second expedition in 1843, Godey had another opportunity to show his skill and bravery. On the Mojave Desert Spanish Trail, Godey and Kit Carson fought off a group of Native Americans, preventing an attack on the expedition and recovering stolen horses. He worked with Old Bill Williams on Frémont's fourth expedition. Working with Frémont, he attained the rank of Lieutenant in the California Battalion. For a short time, Frémont put him in charge of Mission San Luis Rey. Godey spoke French, English, Spanish, and a few Native American languages.

During the Battle of San Pasqual on December 6, 1846, when the US Army was surrounded and outnumbered, Godey led a small group out of the battle and past enemy lines.

== Personal life ==
In 1848, Godey built a home in Bakersfield and became a miner, rancher, local guide, and Indian agent. When gold was discovered for the first time in the Kern River by a group of Native Americans, they gave this to Godey.

In 1852, Robert S. Williamson hired Godey to help the Pacific Rail Road Survey survey the land for the future Southern Pacific Railroad line that followed the 32nd parallel from Texas to California. The route followed the Gila River to the Pima villages and the Rio Grande river. He also ran a ferry in Firebaugh, California.

In 1854, Godey was the scout for Kit Carson on his last visit to Kern County.

Godey partnered briefly with Edward Fitzgerald Beale to raise sheep on his Tejon Ranch in 1855 and became the overseer of the ranch for a few years.

As an Indian agent, he was the overseer of the Sebastian Indian Reservation in 1864. Godey was also the overseer for Rancho San Emidio on behalf of Frémont in 1868.

In 1870, Godey's divorce from Maria Antonia Coronel was litigated up to the California Supreme Court. Maria was the sister of Antonio F. Coronel, the fourth mayor of Los Angeles.

When the US Land Grant Commission turned down ownership of Rancho Cuyama to the Lataillade family, Godey started a cattle ranch on the land. The US Congress returned the land to the Lataillade family in 1872, so Godey moved off the land and returned to Kern.

== Death ==
Godey died on January 19, 1889, at the age of 70 or 71, at the Sister's Hospital Of Los Angeles, Sisters of Charity. He had been scratched by a circus lion, which he had tried to pet, and the scratch became infected. He was buried in the Union Cemetery in Bakersfield.

The California State Historical Landmark reads:

NO. 690 SITE OF THE LAST HOME OF ALEXIS GODEY - Near this site stood the home of Alexis Godey, frontiersman, and scout, who lived here from 1883 until his death on January 19, 1889. Born in St. Louis, Missouri in 1818, he acted as a guide for John C. Frémont's expedition through the Kern area in 1843-44 and was honored for his services at the Battle of San Pasqual in 1846.

== See also ==
- California Historical Landmarks in Kern County
- California Historical Landmark
