= California Battalion =

- Battalion Flag
- Active: June 1846 – May 1847
- Disbanded: May 31, 1847
- Country: California Republic
- Allegiance: California Republic (until July 1846); United States (after July 1846)
- Type: Mounted Infantry
- Size: Battalion
- Garrison/HQ: Sonoma, California
- Nickname: Fremont's Battalion
- Engagements: Bear Flag Revolt; Battle of Olómpali (1846); Mexican-American War; Siege of Los Angeles (1846); Battle of San Pasqual (1846); Battle of Natividad (1846); Battle of Rio San Gabriel (1847); Battle of La Mesa (1847); Capitulation of Cahuenga (1847)

Commanders
- Notable commanders: William B. Ide; John C. Frémont

The California Battalion (also called the first California Volunteer Militia and U.S. Mounted Rifles) was formed during the Mexican–American War (1846–1848) in present-day California, United States. It was led by U.S. Army Brevet Lieutenant Colonel John C. Frémont and composed of his cartographers, scouts and hunters and the Rebel Californian volunteer militia formed during the Bear Flag Revolt. The battalion's formation was officially authorized by Commodore Robert F. Stockton, commanding officer of the U.S. Navy Pacific Squadron.

== Formation ==
Hostilities between U.S. and Mexican forces had been under way in Texas since April 1846 resulting in a formal declaration of war on 13 May 1846, by the U.S. Congress. On 17 May 1846, unofficial word reached the U.S. Navy fleet of four vessels at anchor in the harbor of Mazatlán, Mexico, and that hostilities had begun between Mexico and the United States. Commodore John D. Sloat, commander of the U.S. Navy's Pacific Squadron, dispatched his flagship, the frigate USS Savannah, and the sloop USS Levant to Monterey harbor where they arrived on 2 July 1846. The Pacific Squadron captured Monterey, California on 7 July 1846 and shortly after took over settlements in the surrounding area.

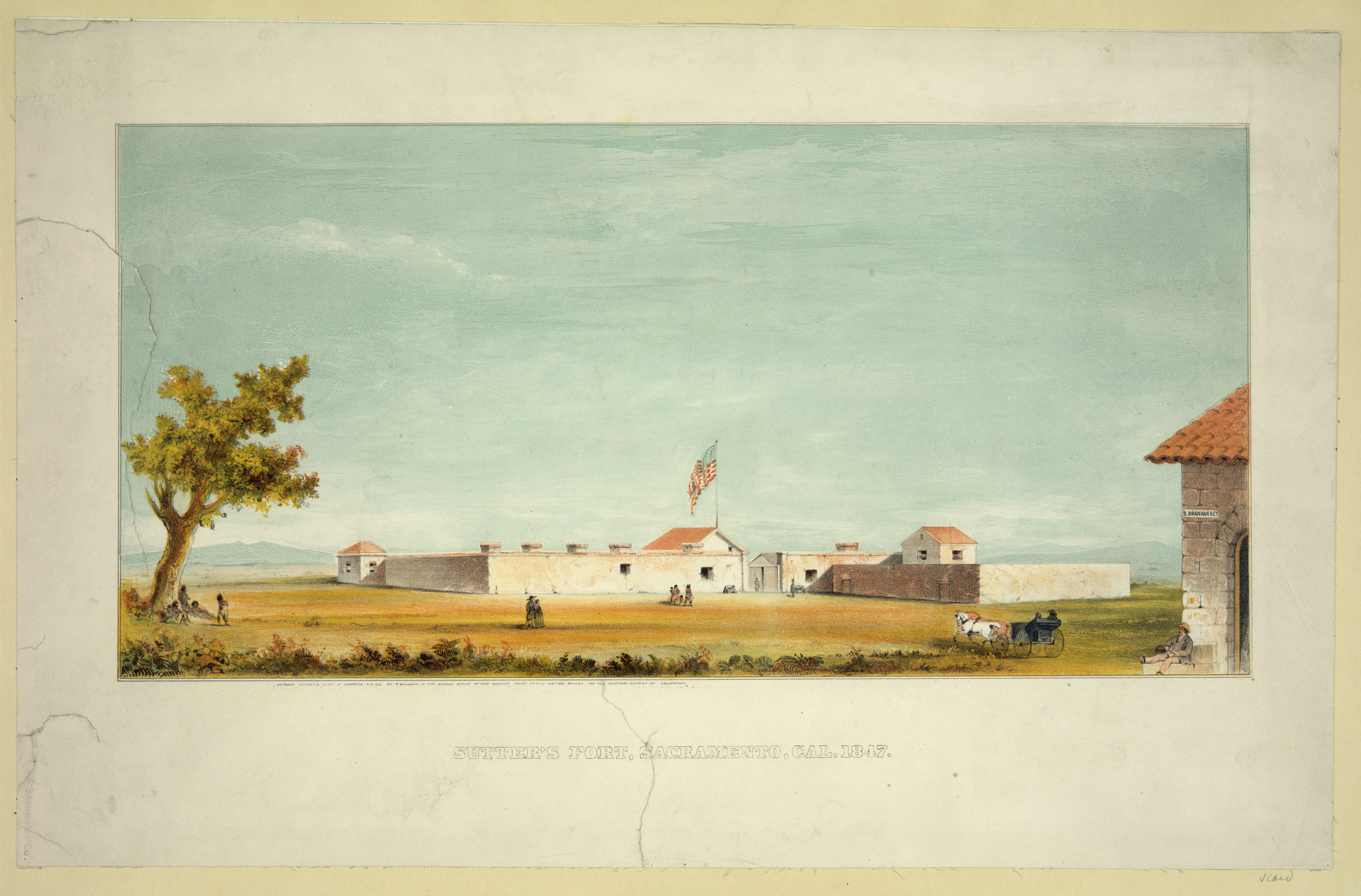
Sutter's fort, the American flag raised July 1846

In 1846, U.S. Marine Lieutenant Archibald H. Gillespie was sent by President James K. Polk with secret verbal messages to the U.S. Consul Thomas O. Larkin in Alta California's Capital in Monterey, Commodore John D. Sloat commanding the Pacific Squadron and U.S. Army Captain John C. Frémont doing cartography work in California. Traveling secretly across Mexico, Lt. Gillespie caught a ship from Mexico to Monterey, California, where he delivered his messages to Thomas Larkin and Sloat. Finding that Frémont was on his way to Oregon, he borrowed a horse and hurried north where he caught up with Frémont's party near the Oregon border. After delivering his messages, Gillespie and Frémont's exploration party turned around and headed back to California, where Frémont supported the nascent Bear Flag Revolt. William B. Ide, leader of the revolt, agreed to merge his rebels with Fremont's men. The California Republic came to an end on July 9 with the raising of the Stars and Stripes over Sonoma by Lt. Joseph Warren Revere.

Most of the Bear flaggers joined Fremont's battalion, even Ide himself, who enlisted as a private. A compact was drawn in early July 1846 for all volunteers to sign, which in part read, "Not to violate the chastity of Women; conduct their revolution honorably; and pledge obedience to their officers." With the signatures or marks of the men, the California Battalion was formed. Frémont accepted other American immigrants who were willing to fight for independence from Mexico at Sutter's Fort. On formation of the battalion, Frémont requested the battalion's volunteers to elect their officers from the ranks. Most were emigrants over the California Trail of 1845 and members of Frémont's own exploration party.

Since there was no U.S. Army present in Alta California except for Frémont's party (and wouldn't be until December 1846), Stockton needed additional men to garrison and help keep the peace in the various California towns that were soon to come under U.S. control. Stockton had three frigates with a crew of 480 each, three to four sloops with a crew of 200 men each plus three store ships at his disposal. The marines on his ships were trained mostly to board or repel boarders or engage in close in ship-to-ship fighting, as well as in infantry tactics. The marines and some sailors could be reassigned shore duties, while leaving the ships shorthanded but still functional. He looked to employ his reassigned 300-400 marines and blue-jacket sailors only where needed.

=== Battalion in Mexican American War ===
The California Battalion was officially authorized a few days later on 23 July 1846 under Commodore Robert F. Stockton (U.S. Navy), the senior military officer in California who replaced Sloat in July 1846. Frémont was given the (brevet) rank of Lieutenant Colonel with U. S. Marine Lieutenant Archibald Gillespie, second in command, promoted to major. Commodore Stockton was in charge of the Pacific Squadron of the U.S. Navy that occupied Monterey, California on 7 July 1846 and Yerba Buena (to be renamed San Francisco) on 9 July 1846.

Frémont's men were officially mustered into the armed forces on 23 July 1846 and authorized $25.00/month pay. The approximate 34 Mission Indians eventually part of the battalion's roster were paid with trade goods as was customary then. The men in the battalion were all volunteers formed from the 60 men of Captain Frémont's Corps of Topographical Engineers (roughly half were soldiers the rest Indians and mountain men) and initially from the Bear Flag Republic members from Sutter's Fort who had started the rebellion in California. There were volunteers from several nationalities including several Californios and a company of Indians from Sutter's Fort.

The first job given to the California Battalion and was to assist in the capture of San Diego and Pueblo de Los Angeles. On 26 July 1846 Lt. Col. J. C. Frémont's California Battalion of about 160 boarded the sloop USS Cyane, under the command of Captain Samuel Francis Du Pont, and sailed for San Diego. They landed 29 July 1846 and a detachment of Marines and blue-jackets, followed shortly by Frémont's California Battalion from Cyane, landed and took possession of the town without firing a shot. Leaving about 40 men to garrison San Diego, Frémont continued on to Los Angeles where on 13 August, with the Navy band playing and colors flying, the combined forces of Stockton and Frémont entered Pueblo de Los Angeles, without a man killed nor shot fired. Marine Lieutenant Archibald Gillespie, Frémont's second in command, was appointed military commander of Los Angeles with from 30 to 50 troops stationed there to keep the peace.

In Pueblo de Los Angeles, the largest city in California with about 3,000 residents, things might have remained peaceful, except that Major Gillespie placed the town under martial law, greatly angering some of the Californios. On 23 September 1846, about 200-300 Californios under Gen. José María Flores staged a revolt, the Siege of Los Angeles, and exchanged shots with the Americans in their quarters at the Government House. Gillespie and his men withdrew from their headquarters in town to Fort Hill which, unfortunately, had no water. Gillespie was caught in a trap, badly outnumbered by the besiegers. John Brown, an American, called by the Californios Juan Flaco, meaning "Lean John", succeeded in breaking through the Californio lines and riding to San Francisco Bay (a distance of almost 400 miles) in an amazing 52 hours where he delivered to Stockton a dispatch from Gillespie notifying him of the situation. Gillespie, on 30 September, finally accepted the terms of capitulation and departed for San Pedro with his forces, weapons and flags plus two cannon (the others were spiked and left behind), accompanied by the exchanged American prisoners and several American residents. It would take about four months of intermittent sparing before Gillespie could raise the same American flag again in Los Angeles.

After news of the Los Angeles revolt reached northern California, Frémont was asked to enlarge his battalion and head for Los Angeles to join with Stockton's men to retake the city. Volunteers rapidly enlarged his force to about 450 men plus more stationed in various northern California towns to keep the peace. The California Trail by this time was starting to deliver a new collection of American colonists and potential recruits—an estimated 1,500 would arrive in 1846.

San Juan Bautista was the marshaling area for Frémont's forces of about 450 men of the California Battalion en route to joining up with Commodore Robert Stockton's and General Stephen W. Kearny's forces (about 500 men) converging on Los Angeles to put down a sputtering revolt there. An American scouting party was attacked by a force of mounted Californios on the Rancho La Natividad in the Salinas Valley. The Californios were attempting to capture some horses being herded by the Americans. A battle ensued in which the Californio force killed four Americans and wounded more. The American volunteers were buried on the Rancho Los Vergeles. The Californios reported no dead and 5 wounded. The Americans reported several Californios killed and wounded. As the Californios retreated the Americans did not give chase. The Walla Walla and Delaware Indian detachment fighting with the Americans fought aggressively and bravely, displaying two scalps they had taken during the conflict.

Commodore Stockton and (brevet) Brigadier General Stephen W. Kearny met at San Diego in December 1846 after being rescued by Stockton's men. Kearny, wounded and with only about 60 unwounded men after the fiasco of the Battle of San Pasqual was ambiguous as to his status. The rank of Commodore and Brigadier General were roughly equivalent (both one star titles) so it was not clear who had superior rank.

In late 1846 Frémont, acting under orders from Commodore Robert F. Stockton to retake the California cities as he marched overland to Los Angeles, led the California Battalion, now expanded to about 400 men, to capture Santa Barbara, California. Frémont led his unit over the Santa Ynez Mountains at San Marcos Pass, in a rainstorm on the night of 24 December 1846. In spite of losing many of his horses, mules, and cannon, which slid down the muddy slopes during the rainy night, his men regrouped in the foothills the next morning, and recaptured the Presidio without bloodshed. Stockton and Kearny by ship went to San Diego and from there marched on Los Angeles with a combined force of about 500 sailors, marines and Army Dragoons. A few days later Fremont led his men southeast towards Los Angeles, accepting the surrender of Andrés Pico on the Cahuenga Plain on 13 January 1847.

Frémont specifically quoted his title as California Battalion commander in the Treaty of Cahuenga:

To All Who These Presents Shall Come, Greeting: Know Ye, that in consequence of propositions of peace, or cessation of hostilities, being submitted to me, as Commandant of the California Battalion of the United States forces, which have so far been acceded to by me as to cause me to appoint a board of commissioners to confer with a similar board appointed by the Californians, and it requiring a little time to close the negotiations; it is agreed upon and ordered by me that an entire cessation of hostilities shall take place until to-morrow afternoon (13 January), and that the said Californians be permitted to bring in their wounded to the mission of San Fernando, where, also, if they choose, they can move their camp to facilitate said negotiations.

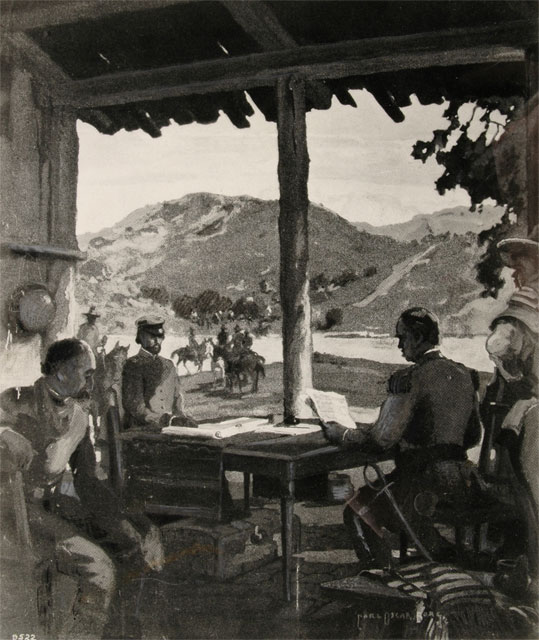
John C. Fremont Officially ending the Conquest of California

Both Kearny and Stockton though out-ranking Frémont wanted to avoid further hostilities and accepted the treaty negotiated by Frémont. On 16 January 1847, Commodore Stockton appointed Frémont military governor of California following the Treaty of Cahuenga signed by Frémont and Andrés Pico which ended the Mexican–American War in California. However, U.S. Army Brigadier General Stephen Watts Kearny, who outranked Frémont (and was nominally of the same rank as Commodore Stockton) said he had orders from the President and Secretary of War to serve as governor and demanded that Frémont give up the position of California governor. Frémont, with conflicting orders, stubbornly refused to do this. As Kearny's forces steadily built up with the arrival of Colonel Jonathan D. Stevenson and his about 600 men in the 1st Regiment of New York Volunteers in March 1847 along with the departure of Commodore Robert Stockton left Frémont with almost no supporters. On 31 May 1847 Col. Richard B. Mason was appointed military governor of California by Kearny as he prepared to go back east over the California Trail. Kearny ordered Frémont to order his men to either sign up in the regular army or disburse. Frémont said they would happily disburse as soon as they were paid—which was difficult since almost nobody had any cash money. Somehow money was secured and nearly all California Battalion members mustered out.

Kearny ordered Frémont to accompany him back east over the route of the California Trail. They were accompanied East by about 19 of Frémont's original scouting party who wanted to return home and a group of Mormon Battalion men who had re-enlisted to get back to their families and homes in Salt Lake City, Iowa and Nebraska. They went back East over the California Trail in reverse direction that most immigrants took. They buried some of the Donner Party who had died in 1846 in the Sierra Nevada (U.S.) mountains. When Kearny and Frémont arrived at Fort Leavenworth, Kansas in August 1847, Kearny told Frémont to consider himself under arrest and to report to Washington, D.C. for court martial. There after an almost three-month trial he was finally convicted of mutiny but recommended for remediation to President James K. Polk. Polk quickly commuted Frémont's sentence of dishonorable discharge in light of his service in the war and offered him reinstatement of his army commission. Frémont however, considered his conviction an injustice and resigned his commission and moved back to California with his family settling on Rancho Las Mariposas that Thomas O. Larkin had bought for him at his request. Reportedly there was $10,000,000 worth of gold found on this Mariposa ranch in later years although Frémont had to fight with the many squatters who mined much of the gold.

== Flags ==
The battalion flag was made by the men on board the Savannah. It was given to the battalion on November 16, 1846. The flag is based on the Great Seal of the United States. It has a blue background with a bald eagle in the center of its field, a large American shield in front of the eagle, at the bottom left of the shield an olive branch. The right side contains four silver arrows. Above the eagle is a silver scroll with the inscription, "California Battalion", in gold. Another silver scroll is below the eagle and bears no inscription.

Some companies, such as E and G, carried their own flags. The flag carried by Company E was based on the bear flag but with a swallow-tail at the end. Company G's flag was similar to the battalion flag. It contains a blue field with a bald eagle perched on top of an American shield with two American flags hanging on each side of it.

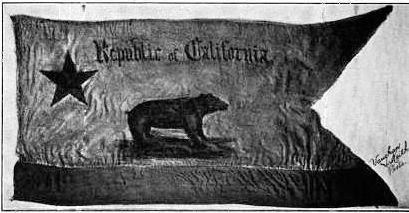
Company E's flag, also known as the Grigsby Guidon, or the Revere Guidon, made in the early days of the revolt

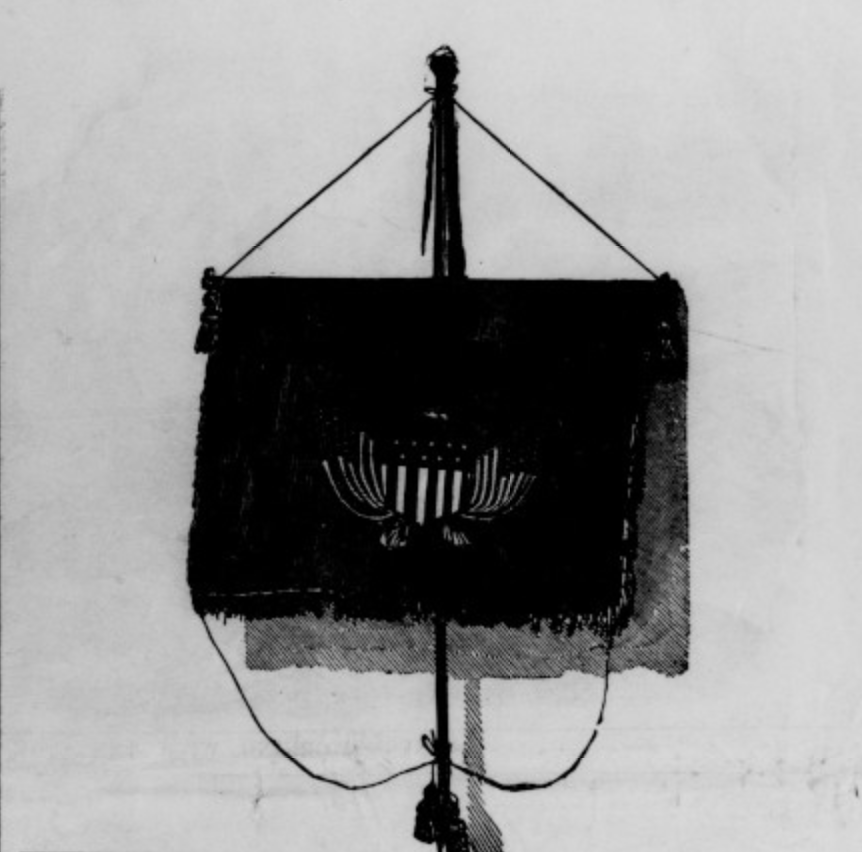
Company G's flag

== Battalion Organization ==
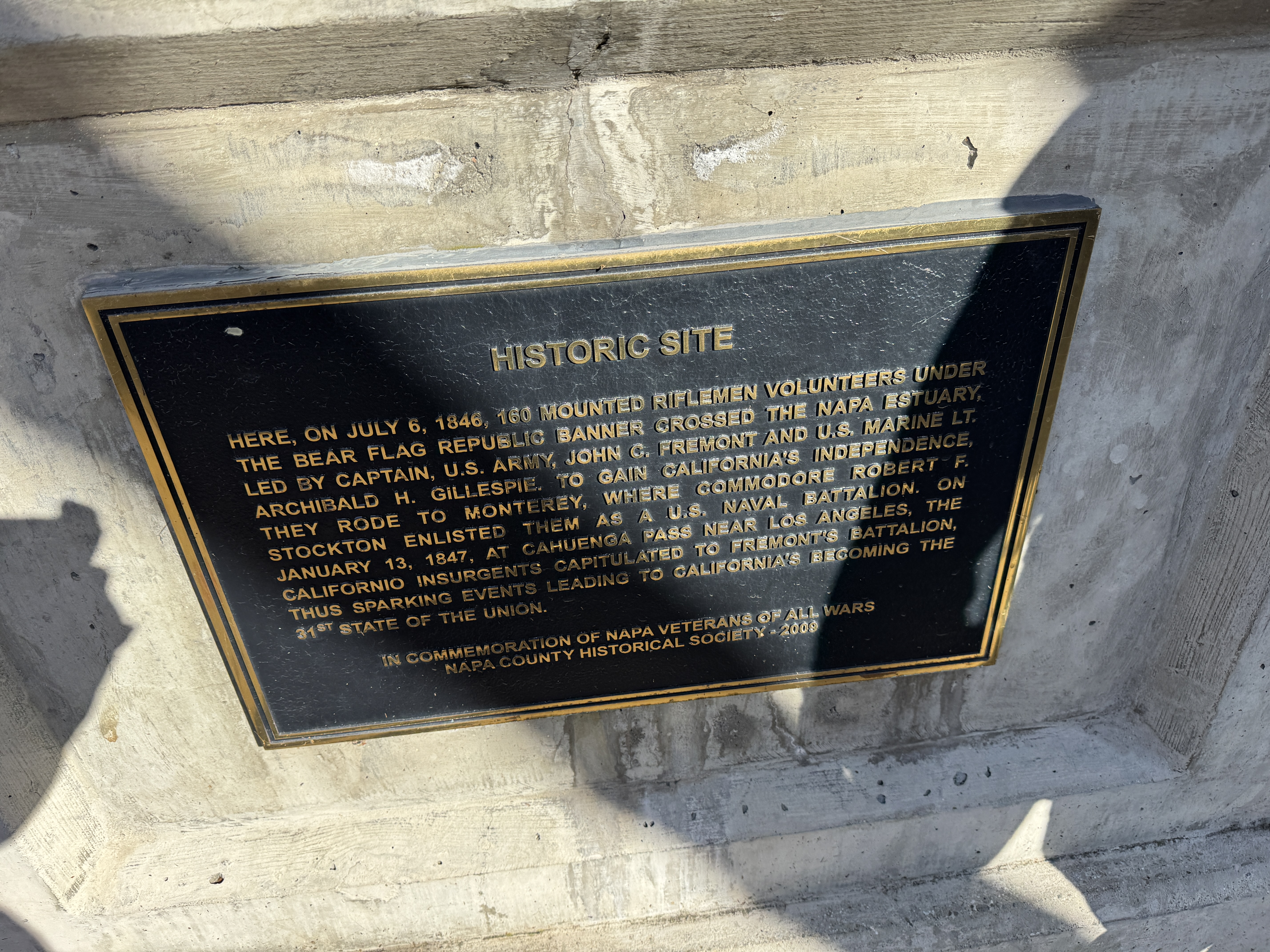
A historical marker noting Fremont's Crossing of the Napa River on July 6, 1846 in Napa, California.

- Commanding officer: Lt.-Colonel John C. Frémont US Army
- Second in command: Major Archibald Gillespie USMC

The battalion was organized into eight companies:

- Co. A. Capt. Richard "Dick" Owens (Owens Valley; Owens River) Wm. N. Loker, 1st lieutenant, appointed adjutant, 10 Feb. 1847; B.M. Hudspeth, 2d lieutenant, appointed captain, Feb. 1847, Wm. Findlay, 2nd lieutenant, appointed captain, Feb. 1847.
- Co. B. Capt. Henry L. Ford (nephew of Mary Todd Lincoln); Andrew Copeland, 1st lieutenant.
- Co. C. Capt. Granville P. Swift; Wm. Baldridge, 1st lieutenant; Wm. Hartgrove, 2nd lieutenant.
- Co. D. Capt. John Sears; Wm. Bradshaw, 1st lieutenant.
- Co. E. Capt. John Grigsby; Archibald Jesse, 1st lieutenant.
- Co. F. Capt. Lansford W. Hastings (Hastings Cut-Off fame); Wornbough, 1st lieutenant; J.M. Hudspeth, 2nd lieutenant.
- Co. G. Capt. Bluford K. "Hell Roaring" Thompson; Davis 1st lieutenant; Rock, 2nd lieutenant.
- Co. H. Capt. Richard T. Jacob; Edwin Bryant, 1st lieutenant (afterwards alcalde at San Francisco); Geo. M. Lippincott, 2nd lieutenant (of New York). About 34 Indians were in this company. The Indians typically were employed as scouts and guards in front and in back of the column while transiting.
- Co. Artillery. Capt. Louis McLane U.S. Navy, (in charge of their two small cannons) (promoted to major); John. K. Wilson, 1st lieutenant, (appointed captain in January, 1847); Wm. Blackburn, 2nd lieutenant. (later alcalde of Santa Cruz).

And outriders, hunters, couriers, and scouts, including Delaware, Cosumnes River, 10 Walla Walla and Chinook Indians, scouts Kit Carson (enrolled as a Lieutenant) and Scout Alexis Godey, captain (appointed by Stockton);.

- Officers on detached Service and doing Duty at the South.–Samuel J. Hensley, captain; S. Gibson, captain (lanced through the body at Battle of San Pasqual); Miguel Pedrorena, captain, Spaniard (appointed by Stockton); Santiago Argüello, captain, Californian (appointed by Stockton); Bell, captain (appointed by Stockton), old resident of California (Los Angeles); H. Rhenshaw, 1st lieutenant, (appointed by Stockton); Jas. Barton, captain (appointed by Stockton); L. Arguello, captain, Californian (appointed by Stockton).

The complete roster of the California Battalion is given by the following two references.
