= Battle of Natividad =

1847 Battle of the Mexican-American War

- Part of the Conquest of California; Mexican–American War
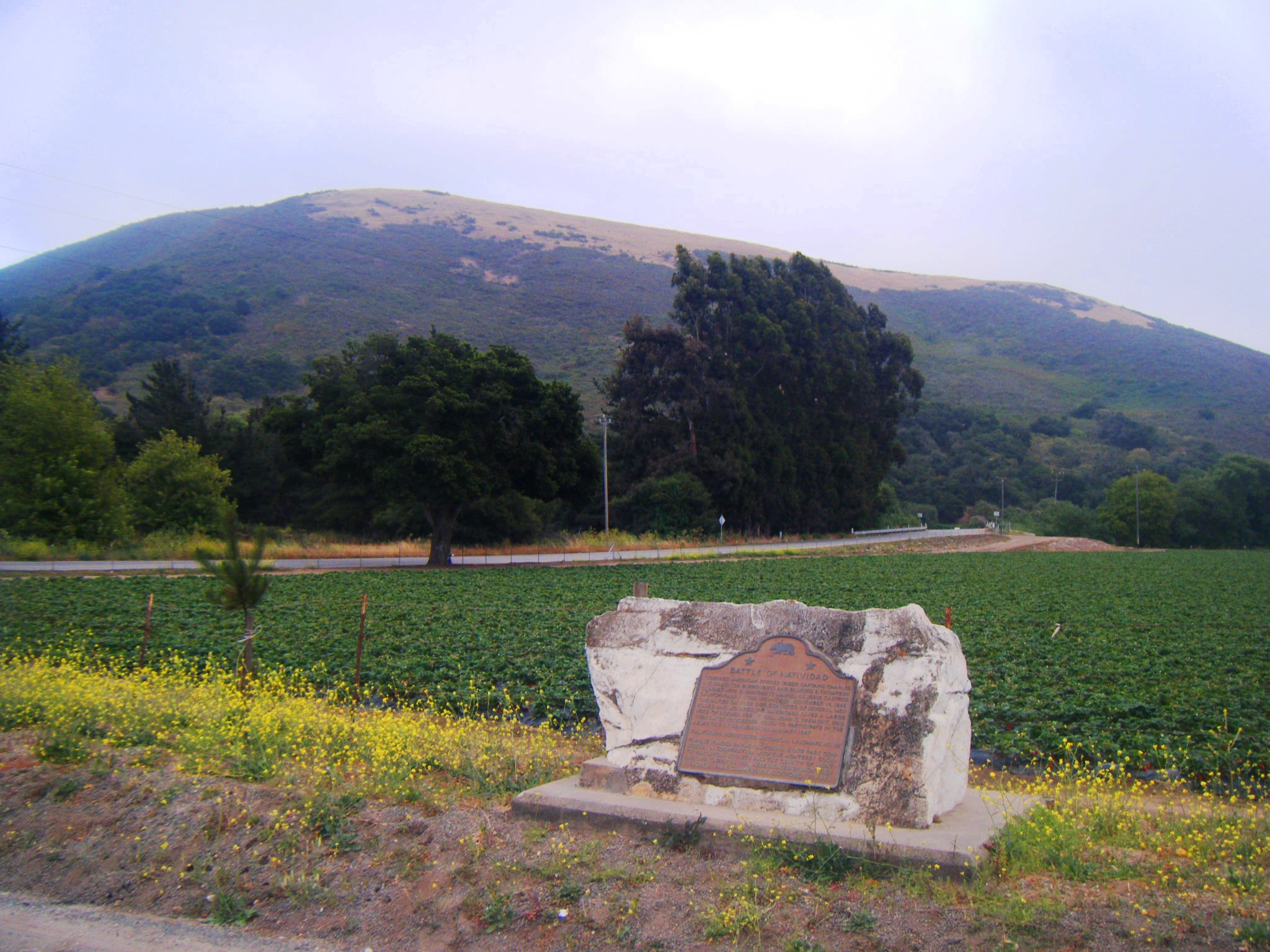
- Battle of Natividad historic marker
Date	November 16, 1846
Location	Rancho La Natividad (modern day Salinas Valley), California 36°46′22″N 121°36′13″W
Result	American Victory: Americans advance to Pueblo de Los Ángeles.

Belligerents
United States	Mexico

Commanders and leaders
(United States) Charles Burroughs; Bluford K. Thompson (California Republic) John C. Fremont	Manuel de Jesus Castro

Strength
Total: 60: 60 Militia; Pro U.S. Anglo-Californio Militiamen; 10 on Horseback; Walla Walla Scouts; Lenape Scouts	Total: 90: 30 Militia; Mexican Californio Militiamen; Mexican Militiamen; Nuevo Mexico Militiamen; 30 Veteran Cavalry; 30 Californio Lancers

Casualties and losses
Total: 13–25: 4–5 Deaths; 9–20 Wounded	Total: 8–10: 3 Deaths; 5–7 Wounded

California Historical Landmark
- Official name: Site of the Battle of Natividad
- Reference no.: 651

The Battle of the Natividad took place on November 16, 1846, in the Salinas Valley, in present-day Monterey County, California, United States, during the California Campaign of the Mexican–American War, between United States organized California militia (the California Battalion) and loyalist Mexican militia.

== Battle ==
San Juan Bautista was the marshaling area for Lieutenant Colonel John C. Frémont's forces of about 450 men of the California Battalion en route to joining up with Commodore Robert Stockton's and General Stephen W. Kearny's forces of about 500 men converging on Los Angeles to put down a sputtering revolt there.

Flag carried by Californios

An American scouting party was attacked by a force of mounted Mexican Californios on Rancho La Natividad in the Salinas Valley. The Californios were attempting to capture some horses being herded by the Americans to Fremont's base. A battle ensued in which the Californio force killed four Americans and wounded more. The American volunteers were buried on the Gomez Rancho. The Californios reported no deaths but 5 wounded. The Americans reported several Californios dead and several wounded. As the Californios retreated, the Americans did not give chase. The Walla Walla and Lenape detachment, fighting with the Americans, fought aggressively and bravely displaying two scalps they had taken during the conflict.

== Aftermath ==
The battle was important because although it was only a minor skirmish, the Americans were able to keep their horses and therefore deliver them in a timely manner to Frémont and his California Battalion on their march to Southern California. The Treaty of Cahuenga signed by Frémont and Andrés Pico in January 1847 ended all hostilities in California. The final clause of this treaty:

That the paroles of all officers, citizens and others of the United States, and of naturalized citizens of Mexico, are by this foregoing capitulation cancelled; and every condition of said paroles from and after this date are of no further force and effect; and all prisoners of both parties are hereby released.

was inserted to protect several members of the Californios fighting in this fight who were in clear violation of their paroles they had given to keep the peace and not undertake hostilities.

The site of the battle is now registered as California Historical Landmark #651.

== See also ==
- List of battles of the Mexican–American War
- List of conflicts in the United States
