= Natividad, California =

Unincorporated community in California, United States

Natividad
- Unincorporated community
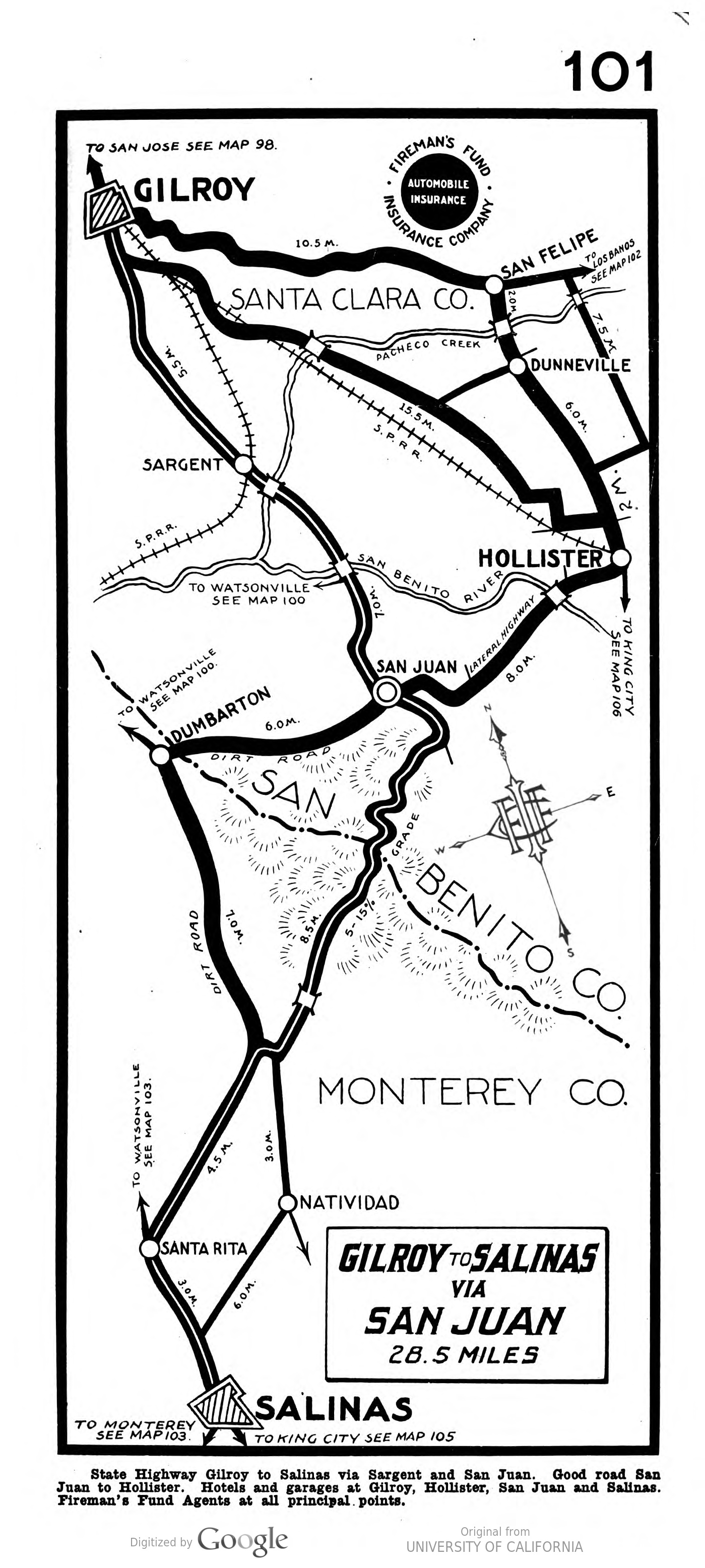
- Gilroy to Salinas via San Juan road map, 1916

- Location in California Natividad (the United States)
- Coordinates: 36°43′58″N 121°35′48″W
- Country: United States
- State: California
- County: Monterey
- Elevation: 160 ft (50 m)

Natividad (Spanish for "Nativity") is an unincorporated community and ghost town in Monterey County, California, United States. It is located 5 miles (8 km) northeast of Salinas, at an elevation of 164 feet (50 m).

== History ==
Natividad was named for the Rancho La Natividad Mexican land grant which included the community. It was the site of a significant battle of the Mexican-American War in 1846. A post office operated at Natividad from 1855 to 1908. Natividad was a bustling station for stage coaches in the 1850s until traffic was re-routed through Salinas. The town declined after the completion of the Southern Pacific Railroad through Salinas in 1872, and its last remaining building, a saloon, was demolished in 1964.

The Battle of Natividad of the Mexican-American War was fought just north of the townsite. A historical marker commemorates the battleground.
