= Rancho Capay =

Mexican land grant in California

Coordinates: 39.760°N 122.050°W

Rancho Capay was a 44,388-acre (179.63 km^{2}) Mexican land grant in present-day Tehama County and Glenn County, California given in 1844 by Governor Manuel Micheltorena to Maria Josefa Soto. The name comes from the Wintun word meaning stream, and refers to Stony Creek. The grant extended two leagues in width and five leagues along the west side of the Sacramento River from Thomes Creek and Rancho Saucos on the north to Stony Creek on the south, and encompassed present day Hamilton City and Monroeville.

== History ==
Maria Josefa Soto (1810–1855) was married to Gil Cano (1813–1844), a soldier in the Mexican Army. Cano died in 1844, and Josefa Soto was a widow with four children (Rafael Cano, Nicholas Cano, Luisa Cano, and Guadalupe Cano) when she received the ten square league Rancho Capay grant. She married James Stokes in 1844. Dr. James (Santiago) Stokes (1810–1864), an English sailor who came to Monterey in 1834, was a doctor, druggist, and mayor of Monterey. Maria Josefa Soto and James Stokes had eleven more children (James, Junior, Manuel, Domingo, Catherine, Josephine, William, Henry, Mary, Fanny and Luisa). Stokes bought Rancho Los Vergeles in 1848. The Stokes lived in Monterey.

With the cession of California to the United States following the Mexican-American War, the 1848 Treaty of Guadalupe Hidalgo provided that the land grants would be honored. As required by the Land Act of 1851, a claim was filed with the Public Land Commission in 1852, and the grant was patented to Josefa Soto in 1859.

A claim by Pierson B. Reading for five square leagues was filed with the Land Commission in 1852 but was rejected.

Maria Josefa Soto de Stokes died in Monterey in 1855 leaving as her heirs, her husband and children. In 1857, the California Legislature passed an Act authorizing Dr. Stokes to sell the real property of her estate. In 1858 Dr. Stokes, sold the rancho to Richard Walsh. Walsh immediately sold the entirety of the northern portion of the grant to J. W. Mclntosh.

In 1858, James Stokes married Arabella Clark (1838–). It was a disastrous second marriage, and Stokes took his own life in 1864. In his will, Stokes appointed Frederick Sherwood, who had married his daughter Catherine, and George H. Winterburn, who had married his daughter Josephine, executors of his estate.
