= Rancho La Natividad =

Mexican land grant in California

Coordinates: 36.740°N 121.600°W

Rancho La Natividad was a 8,642-acre (34.97 km^{2}) Mexican land grant in present-day Monterey County, California, United States, given in 1837 by Governor Juan B. Alvarado to Manuel Butrón and his son-in-law, Nicolás Alviso. Rancho La Natividad and Rancho Los Vergeles were adjoining ranchos along Gabilan Creek north of present-day Salinas. The headquarters of each rancho were close to the entrance to the pass through the Gabilan Range to San Juan Bautista. The Rancho La Natividad grant encompassed present-day Natividad.

== History ==
Manuel Butrón and Nicolás Alviso received the two square league Rancho La Natividad in 1837. Butrón had been occupying the land for a long time before the date of the grant. Manuel Josef Butrón (April 8, 1776 – 1842), born in Monterey, Monterey County, Alta California, New Spain, was the son of Manuel Butrón (1727 – January 4, 1793), and Margarita Maria (California Native). Manuel Butrón was buried in the floor of the chapel of Mission San Carlos Borromeo del Carmelo, Monterey County, Alta California, New Spain (often referred to as the Monterey Mission), a Spanish soldier who came to California in 1769, and later received the first California land grant in 1775.

Manuel Josef Butrón married María Ygnacia Rita Higuera (1778–1844), who was baptized February 13, 1778, at the Santa Clara Mission and was buried at Mission San Juan Baptista Cemetery, San Benito County, Alta California, Mexico. She was the daughter of Jose Manuel Higuera (1769–1803) and Maria Ygnacia Antonia Limon Redondo, married on January 30, 1794, at Mission Santa Clara, Santa Clara County (now Alameda County), Alta California, New Spain.

Their daughter Maria Isabel Butron (November 20, 1796 – February 1, 1848) married Angel Maria Dolores Castro on December 12, 1812.

Their daughter Rosa Maria Josefa Buitron (August 30, 1812 – December 13, 1890) married Vicente Canet of Rancho San Bernardo on October 14, 1828.

Their daughter Maria Ramona Sixta Butrón (March 1819–) married Jerimiah McMahon on March 10, 1848.

Their daughter Bárbara Gertrudis Butrón (December 3, 1794–) married Nicolás Alviso on February 12, 1813. Nicolás Alviso (1792–1844), the son of Francisco Javier Alviso, served as majordomo at Mission Soledad.

Their daughter Maria Ygnacia Vicenta Butron (April 5, 1801 – August 2, 1830) married Jose Quintin Ortega on November 9, 1817.

Their daughter Maria Juana Lorenza Butron (January 31, 1803 – ?) married Joaquin Soto on May 10, 1818.

Their son Juan de Dios Butron (January 12, 1805 – ?) married Ramona Gonzales on January 11, 1832, at the San Juan Baptista Mission.

Their daughter Maria Josefa Buitron (April 19, 1807 - ?) Misión Nuestra Señora de la Soledad bapt. #1301, unmarried

Their son Felipe de Jesus Casmiro Butron (March 2, 1810 – before 1853) married Casmira German on February 2, 1835.

Their son Manuel Salustriano Butron (June 9, 1823 – 1872) married Maria Antonia Buelna on October 27, 1845.

Their daughter Antonia Francisca Emigdia Butron married William Robert Garner (1803–1849; born in England) on November 25, 1831. William Robert Garner ran a Redwood lumber mill distributing redwood lumber for building the missions fixing earthquake damage and the other buildings of the area and time.

With the cession of California to the United States following the Mexican-American War, the 1848 Treaty of Guadalupe Hidalgo provided that the land grants would be honored. As required by the Land Act of 1851, a claim for Rancho La Natividad was filed with the Public Land Commission in 1853, and the grant was patented to Maria Ramona Butrón and Jerimah McMahon in 1874.

== Historic sites of the Rancho ==
- Battle of Natividad – the Mexican-American War battle took place on the rancho on November 16, 1846.

== See also ==
- Ranchos of California
- List of Ranchos of California
