= Treaty of Cahuenga =

1847 agreement that ended the Conquest of California

Treaty of Cahuenga Tratado de Cahuenga
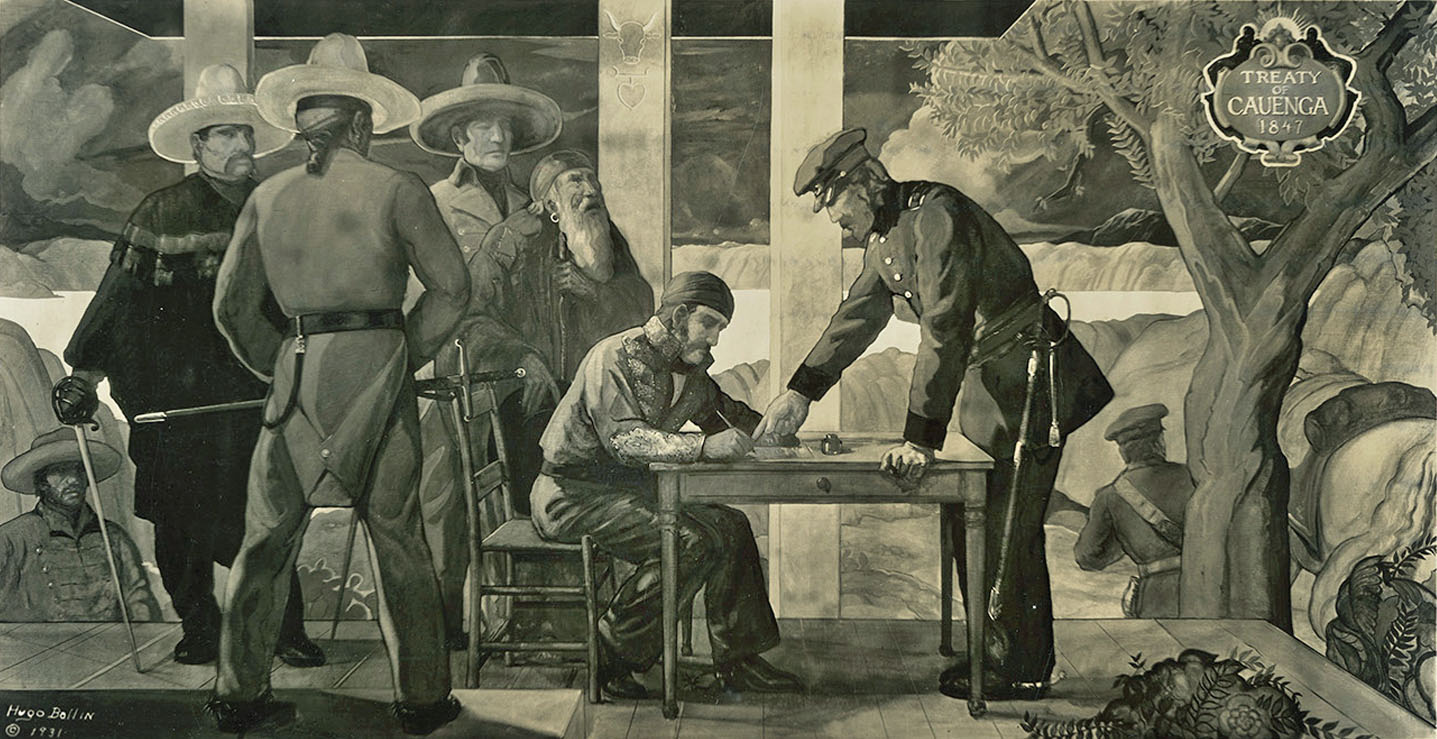
- Signing of the treaty at Campo de Cahuenga by Andrés Pico and John C. Frémont
- Type: Capitulation
- Signed: January 13, 1847
- Location: Campo de Cahuenga, Alta California, Mexico
- Condition: Ceasefire in Alta California between Californio and US Forces.
- Signatories: Andrés Pico; John C. Frémont
- Parties: United States; Mexico
- Languages: Spanish and English

The Treaty of Cahuenga (Spanish: Tratado de Cahuenga), also called the Capitulation of Cahuenga (Capitulación de Cahuenga), was an 1847 agreement that ended the Conquest of California, resulting in a ceasefire between Californios and Americans. The treaty was signed at the Campo de Cahuenga on 13 January 1847, ending the fighting of the Mexican–American War within Alta California (modern-day California). The treaty was drafted in both English and Spanish by José Antonio Carrillo and signed by John C. Frémont, representing the American forces, and Andrés Pico, representing the Mexican forces.

The treaty called for the Californios to give up their artillery, and provided that all prisoners from both sides be immediately freed. Those Californios who promised not to again take up arms during the war, and to obey the laws and regulations of the United States, were allowed to peaceably return to their homes and ranchos. They were to be allowed the same rights and privileges as were allowed to citizens of the United States, and were not to be compelled to take an oath of allegiance until a treaty of peace was signed between the United States and Mexico, and were given the privilege of leaving the country if they wished to do so.

Under the later Treaty of Guadalupe Hidalgo in 1848, Mexico formally ceded Alta California and other territories to the United States, and the disputed border of Texas was fixed at the Rio Grande. Pico, like nearly all the Californios, became an American citizen with full legal and voting rights. Pico later became a State Assemblyman and then a State Senator representing Los Angeles in the California State Legislature.

== Background ==
On December 27, 1846, Frémont and the California Battalion, in their march south to Los Angeles, reached a deserted Santa Barbara and raised the American flag. He occupied a hotel close to the adobe of Bernarda Ruiz de Rodriguez, a wealthy educated woman of influence and Santa Barbara town matriarch, who had four sons on the Mexican side. She asked for and was granted ten minutes of Frémont's time, which stretched to two hours; she advised him that a generous peace would be to his political advantage—one that included Pico's pardon, release of prisoners, equal rights for all Californians and respect of property rights.

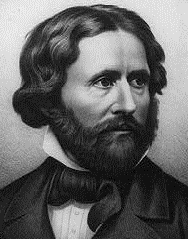
John C. Frémont

Frémont later wrote, "I found that her object was to use her influence to put an end to the war, and to do so upon such just and friendly terms of compromise as would make the peace acceptable and enduring. ... She wished me to take into my mind this plan of settlement, to which she would influence her people; meantime, she urged me to hold my hand, so far as possible. ... I assured her I would bear her wishes in mind when the occasion came."

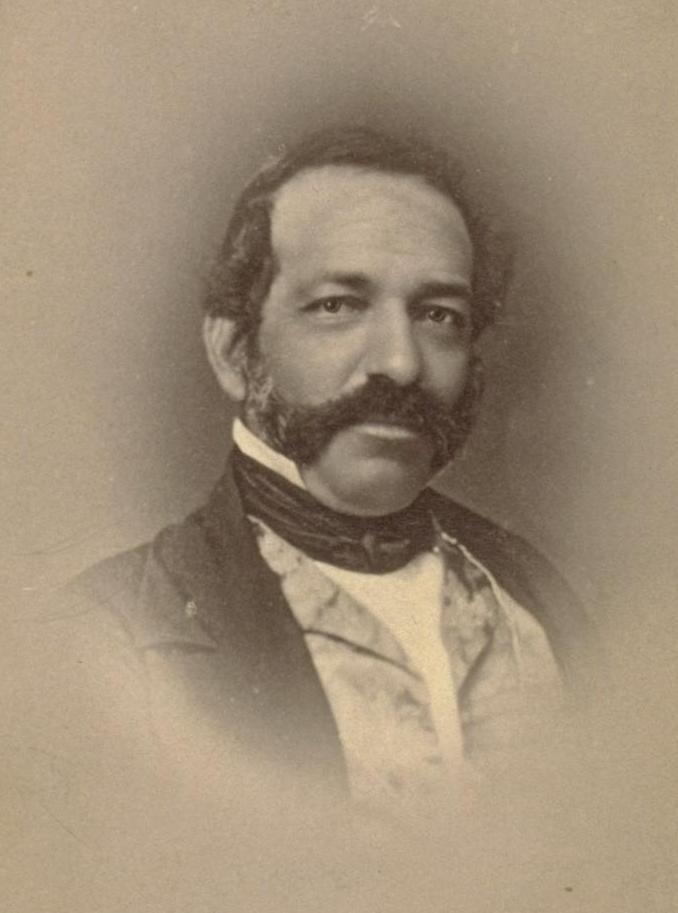
Andrés Pico

On January 8, 1847, Frémont arrived at San Fernando. On January 10, the combined army of Commodore Robert F. Stockton and Brigadier Stephen W. Kearny re-took Los Angeles following the Battle of the San Gabriel River and the Battle of La Mesa. Frémont learned of the reoccupation the next day. Frémont and two of Pico's officers agreed to the terms for a surrender, and Articles of Capitulation were penned by Jose Antonio Carrillo in both English and Spanish. The first seven articles in the treaty were nearly the verbatim suggestions offered by Bernarda Ruiz de Rodriguez.

On January 13, at a rancho at the north end of Cahuenga Pass, John Frémont, Andrés Pico and six others signed the Articles of Capitulation, which became known as the Treaty of Cahuenga. The treaty, signed by the Mexican military commander of the area and a U.S. army colonel, was made without the formal backing of either the American government in Washington or the Mexican government in Mexico City, and even the ranking U.S. officers in the area (General Kearny and Commodore Stockton) were unaware of it. Still, it was eventually honored by both national governments and was immediately and permanently observed by the local American and Californio populations. Fighting ceased, thus ending the war in California.

On January 14, the California Battalion entered Los Angeles in a rainstorm, and Frémont delivered the treaty to Commodore Robert Stockton. Kearny and Stockton decided to accept the liberal terms offered by Frémont to terminate hostilities although Andrés Pico had broken his earlier pledge that he would not fight U.S. forces. The next day, Stockton approved the Treaty of Cahuenga in a message that he sent to the Secretary of the Navy.

== Historical re-enactment ==
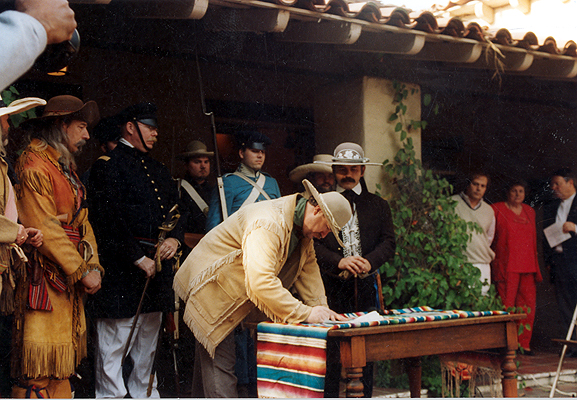
Reenactment of John C. Frémont and Andrés Pico signing the Treaty of Cahuenga at Campo de Cahuenga.

In celebration, on or around the date of the original signing, a historical ceremony is conducted at Campo de Cahuenga State Historic Park and site. From time to time, some of the descendants have appeared, along with actors to re-create this historical moment.

== See also ==
- Bibliography of the Mexican American War
- Timeline of the Mexican American War
- Outline of the Mexican American War
- Cahuenga, California; Tongva settlement.
- Treaties of Velasco, a similar treaty ending the Texas Revolution.
