= Rancho Los Vergeles =

Mexican land grant in California

Coordinates: 36.800°N 121.580°W

Rancho Los Vergeles was a 8,760-acre (35.5 km^{2}) Mexican land grant in present-day Monterey County and San Benito County, California given in 1835 by Governor José Castro to José Joaquín Gómez. The name means "flower garden". Rancho La Natividad and Rancho Los Vergeles were adjoining ranchos, north of present-day Salinas. The rancho headquarters of each were close to the entrance to the pass through the Gabilan Range to San Juan Bautista.

== History ==
José Joaquín Gómez came to California from Mexico in 1830. He was regidor at Monterey in 1834–1835. In 1835 he was commissioned to secularize Mission San Carlos Borromeo de Carmelo, and was the grantee of the two square league Rancho Los Vergeles. José Eusebio Boronda, grantee of Rancho Rincon de Sanjon, served as Mayordomo. It was at Gómez rancho in 1846, that American consul, Thomas O. Larkin, was taken prisoner by the Californios during the Mexican–American War. To clear debts, Gómez sold Rancho Los Vergeles to James Stokes in 1848.

James (Santiago) Stokes (–1864), an English seaman, came to California in 1840. He was a doctor, druggist, and mayor of Monterey. In 1844, he married the widow, Maria Josefa Soto De Cano (1810–1855), who was the grantee of Rancho Capay. The Stokes lived in Monterey.

With the cession of California to the United States following the Mexican–American War, the 1848 Treaty of Guadalupe Hidalgo provided that the land grants would be honored. As required by the Land Act of 1851, a claim for Rancho Los Vergeles was filed with the Public Land Commission in 1852, and the grant was patented to James Stokes in 1875.

Maria Josefa Soto de Stokes died in Monterey in 1855 leaving as her heirs, her husband and children. In 1858, James Stokes married Arabella Clark (1838–), and gave her title to Rancho Los Vergeles. It was a disastrous second marriage, and Stokes killed himself in 1864. In his will, Stokes appointed Frederick Sherwood, who had married his daughter Catherine, and George H. Winterburn, who had married his daughter Josephine, executors of his estate. The executors took possession of Rancho Los Vergeles, and ousted the widow Arabella.

== See also ==
- Ranchos of California
- List of Ranchos of California
