= William B. Ide =

American pioneer and politician (1796-1852)

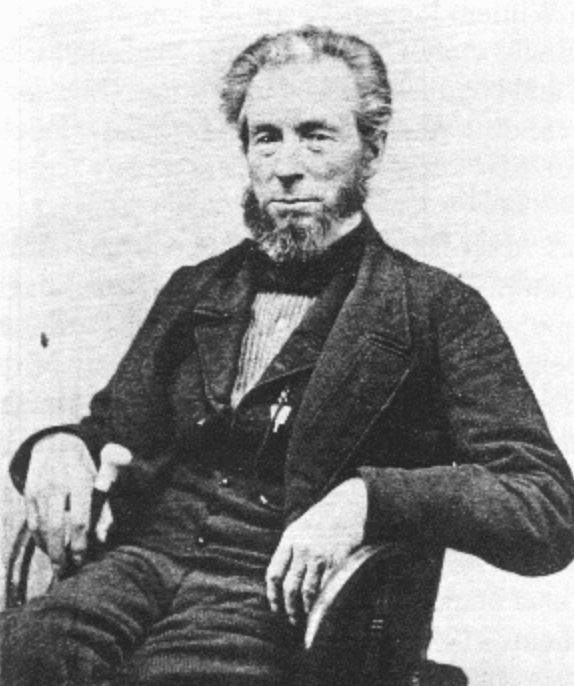
- Photo purported to be of Ide

Commander of the California Republic
- In office June 14, 1846 – July 9, 1846
- Preceded by: Andrés Pico as Governor of Mexican Alta California
- Succeeded by: John D. Sloat as U.S. Military Governor of California

Personal details
- Born: March 28, 1796 Rutland, Massachusetts, U.S.
- Died: December 1852 (aged 56) Red Bluff, California, U.S.
- Cause of death: Smallpox
- Resting place: Monroeville Cemetery, Monroeville, California, U.S.
- Spouse: Susan Ide
- Profession: Farmer; Politician; Soldier

William Brown Ide (March 28, 1796 – December 19 or 20, 1852) was an American pioneer who headed the short-lived California Republic in 1846.

== Life ==
William Ide was born in Rutland, Massachusetts to Lemuel Ide, a member of the Vermont State Legislature. His first ancestor Nicholas Ide arrived to the Americas from England in 1636. A carpenter by trade, Ide married Susan Grout Haskell (1799–1850) in 1820. He and his wife Susan lived at first in Massachusetts, but soon began moving westward—to Kentucky, then to Ohio and finally to Illinois. They farmed in Springfield, where Ide supplemented his income by teaching school.

Since at least as early as 1886 and as late as 1993, some historians have argued that Ide was never a member of The Church of Jesus Christ of Latter-day Saints. This argument was settled in 2014 in the affirmative, however, when researchers Roger Robin Ekins, Michael N. Landon and Richard K. Behrens—building on the work of David Freeman and Ronald L. "Smokey" Bassett—positively identified an unsigned letter in the archives of the LDS Church as being penned by Ide. Ekins has laid out all of the arguments on both sides of this controversy, positively concluding that Ide was baptized a Mormon in July 1837, was likely set apart as the President of the Springville Branch of the Church in July 1844 and was called on a mission to assist Joseph Smith's campaign for the Presidency of the United States on April 6, 1844. Accordingly, Ide and his family were the first known Mormons to enter California and Ide—as commander of the short-lived California Republic—was, arguably, the first LDS head of state.

In 1845, Ide sold his farm and joined a wagon train in Independence, Missouri headed for Oregon. On the advice of the mountain man Caleb Greenwood, Ide and a group of settlers split off and headed to Alta California, then a province of Mexico. They arrived at Sutter's Fort on October 25, 1845. Ide traveled north to work for Peter Lassen on Rancho Bosquejo.

In 1846, on a report that the Mexican government was threatening to expel all settlers who were not Mexican citizens, about thirty settlers conducted what was to become known as the Bear Flag Revolt. On June 14, Ide and the others seized the pueblo of Sonoma and captured the Mexican Commandante of Northern California, Mariano Guadalupe Vallejo, who in fact supported American annexation. On June 15, Ide released the Proclamation he had written the night before. By noon of June 17, the rebels raised the new California Bear Flag, proclaiming the Mexican province to be the California Republic. Ide had been chosen to serve as commander.

=== Ide's proclamation ===
William B. Ide wrote a proclamation announcing and explaining the reasons for the revolt during the night of June 14–15, 1846 (below). There were additional copies and some more moderate versions (produced in both English and Spanish) distributed around northern California through June 18.

To all persons, citizens of Sonoma, requesting them to remain at peace, and to follow their rightful occupations without fear of molestation.

The Commander in Chief of the Troops assembled at the Fortress of Sonoma gives his inviolable pledge to all persons in California not found under arms that they shall not be disturbed in their persons, their property or social relations one to another by men under his command.

He also solemnly declares his object to be First, to defend himself and companions in arms who were invited to this country by a promise of Lands on which to settle themselves and families who were also promised a "republican government," who, when having arrived in California were denied even the privilege of buying or renting Lands of their friends, who instead of being allowed to participate in or being protected by a "Republican Government" were oppressed by a "Military Despotism," who were even threatened, by "Proclamation" from the Chief Officer of the aforesaid Despotism, with extermination if they would not depart out of the Country, leaving all of their property, their arms and beasts of burden, and thus deprived of the means of flight or defense. We were to be driven through deserts, inhabited by hostile Indians to certain destruction. To overthrow a Government which has seized upon the property of the Missions for its individual aggrandizement; which has ruined and shamefully oppressed the laboring people of California, by their enormous exactions on goods imported into this country; is the determined purpose of the brave men who are associated under his command.

He also solemnly declares his object in the Second place to be to invite all peaceable and good Citizens of California who are friendly to the maintenance of good order and equal rights (and I do hereby invite them to repair to my camp at Sonoma without delay) to assist us in establishing and perpetuating a "Republican Government" which shall secure to all: civil and religious liberty; which shall detect and punish crime; which shall encourage industry, virtue and literature; which shall leave unshackled by Fetters, Commerce, Agriculture, and Mechanism.

He further declares that he relies upon the rectitude of our intentions; the favor of Heaven and the bravery of those who are bound to and associated with him, by the principle of self preservation; by the love of truth; and by the hatred of tyranny for his hopes of success.

He further declares that he believes that a Government to be prosperous and happyfying [sic] in its tendency must originate with its people who are friendly to its existence. That its Citizens are its Guardians, its officers are its Servants, and its Glory their reward.

— William B. Ide, Head Quarters Sonoma, June 15, 1846

The Bear Flag Republic lasted until July 9, 1846, just 25 days, until the U.S. Flag was raised at Sonoma. Ide and other "Bear Flaggers" joined John C. Frémont and the U.S. armed forces in taking possession of California from Mexico.

After the Mexican–American War, Ide returned to his home near Red Bluff, California, where he resumed his partnership with Josiah Belden at his Rancho Barranca Colorado. He bought out Belden in 1849, and was successful in mining. Ide went on to a distinguished career as a public servant in Colusi County (the precursor to portions of today's Colusa, Glenn and Tehama Counties). There he served as Probate and County Judge, Presiding Judge of the Court of Sessions, County Recorder, County Auditor, County Clerk, County Treasurer, Deputy County Surveyor and Deputy Sheriff.

Ide died of smallpox in December 1852, probably during the night of the 19th–20th, at the age of 56. He is buried in a small cemetery on the east side of Highway 45, 5 miles south of Hamilton City at the former site of Monroeville where a monument is visible from the road. On June 7, 2014 new gravestones, created by William B. Ide Adobe State Historic Park docent David Freeman and assisted by members of the Chico California Stake of The Church of Jesus Christ of Latter-Day Saints, were dedicated by S. Dennis Holland, President of the California Pioneer Heritage Foundation & Director of Public Affairs of LDS Historic Sites in California.

== Legacy ==
William B. Ide Adobe State Historic Park, comprising a restored adobe house and other buildings near Red Bluff, commemorates his life.
