= Flag of California =

U.S. state flag

State of California
- Bear Flag
- Use: Civil and state flag, state ensign
- Proportion: 2:3
- Adopted: February 3, 1911; 115 years ago (original version); June 14, 1953; 73 years ago (standardized version)
- Design: On a white field, a red star in the upper-left, a red stripe along the bottom, the words 'California Republic' above the stripe, and in the center a dark brown California grizzly walking left on a green grass plat.
- Designed by: Donald Graeme Kelley, based on flag flown during the Bear Flag Revolt
- Flag of the governor of California
- Use: State flag
- Proportion: 2:3
- Design: The flag of the governor of California consists of the seal of California centered on a field of azure. Like many other U.S. governors' flags, there are four five-point stars at the corners of the field.

The flag of California, known as the Bear Flag, is the official flag of the U.S. state of California. The precursor of the flag was first flown during the 1846 Bear Flag Revolt and was also known as the Bear Flag, to which the flag draws most of its features. A predecessor, called the Lone Star Flag, was used in an 1836 independence movement; the red star element from that flag appears in the Bear Flag of today.

== Current flag ==
=== Law and protocol ===
The 1911 statute stated:

The bear flag is hereby selected and adopted as the state flag of California. ... The said bear flag shall consist of a flag of a length equal to one and one-half the width thereof; the upper five-sixths of the width thereof to be a white field, and the lower sixth of the width thereof to be a red stripe; there shall appear in the white field in the upper left-hand corner a single red star, and at the bottom of the white field the words 'California Republic,' and in the center of the white field a California grizzly bear upon a grass plat, in the position of walking toward the left of the said field; said bear shall be dark brown in color and in length, equal to one-third of the length of said flag.

In 1953, the design and specifications for the state flag were standardized in a bill signed by Governor Earl Warren and illustrated by Donald Graeme Kelley of Marin County, California. The Californian state flag is often called the "Bear Flag" and in fact, the present statute adopting the flag, California Government Code § 420, states: "The Bear Flag is the State Flag of California."

Pursuant to Section 439 of the California Government Code, the regulations and protocols for the proper display of the flag of California is controlled by the California Adjutant General:

The Adjutant General shall, by regulation, prescribe rules regarding the times, places, and the manner in which the State Flag may be displayed. He shall, periodically, compile the laws and regulations regarding the State Flag. Copies of the compilation shall be printed and made available to the public at cost by the Department of General Services.

When the flag is displayed vertically, it is rotated 90 degrees clockwise such that the bear and star face upward and red stripe is on the left.

The flag is also used as the state ensign.

=== Design ===
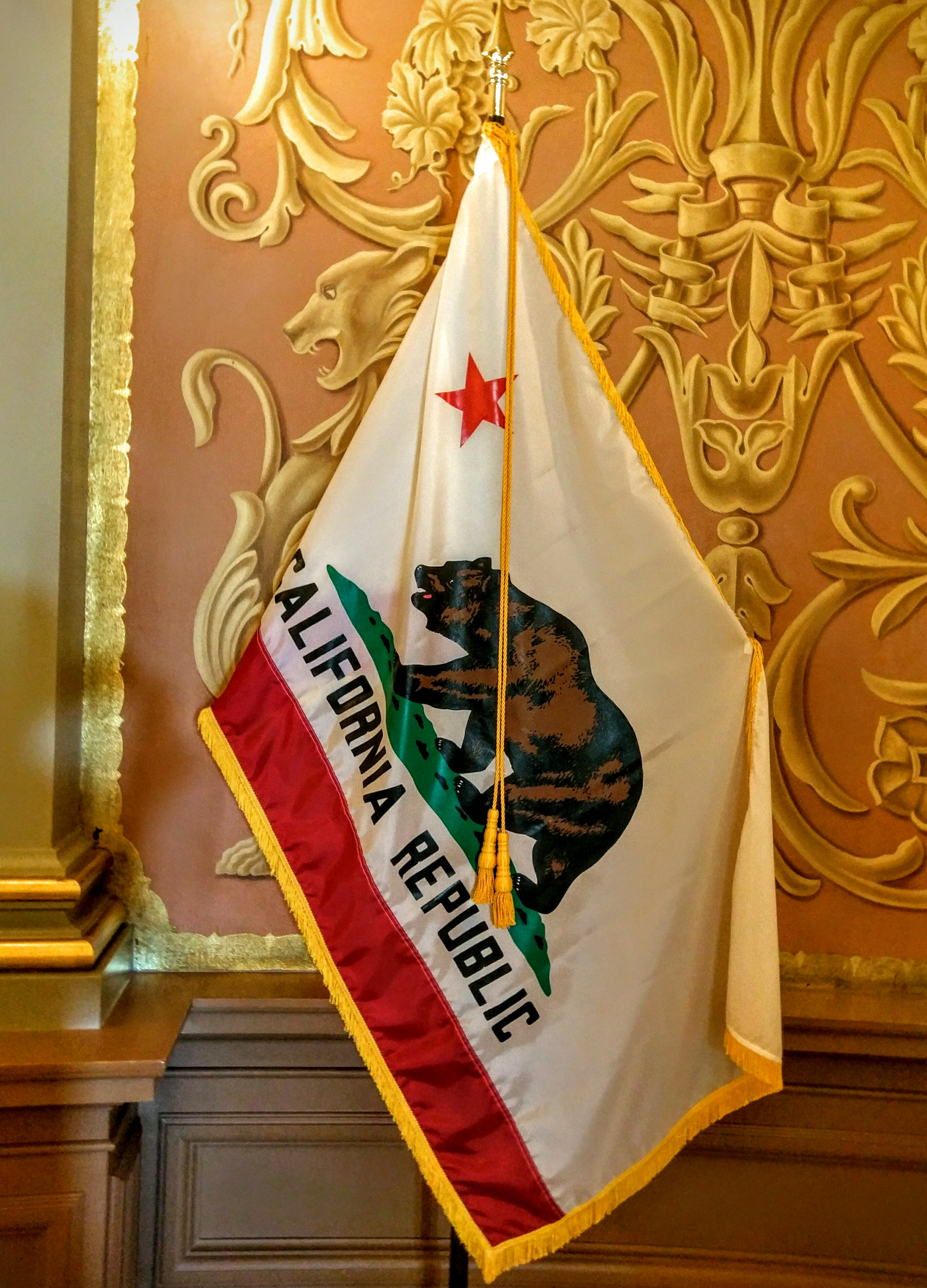
The flag on display at the California State Capitol.

The first official version of the Bear Flag was adopted by the California State Legislature and signed into law by Governor Hiram Johnson in 1911 as the official state flag.

The contemporary state flag is white with a wide red strip along the bottom. There is a red star in the upper left corner and a California grizzly bear facing left (toward the hoist) in the center, walking on a patch of green grass. The size of the bear is two-thirds the size of the hoist width and has a ratio of 2 by 1. The grass plot has a ratio of 11 to 1. The five-point star is taken from the California Lone Star Flag of 1836. The hoist of the flag is two-thirds the fly.

The bear on one 1911 version of the flag is claimed to have been modeled on the last California grizzly bear in captivity. The bear, named "Monarch", was captured in 1889 by newspaper reporter Allan Kelly, at the behest of William Randolph Hearst. The bear was subsequently moved to Woodwards Gardens in San Francisco, and then to the zoo at Golden Gate Park. After the bear's death in 1911, it was mounted and preserved at the Academy of Sciences at Golden Gate Park.

While the bear flag was adopted in 1911, until 1953 the image of the bear varied depending on the flag manufacturer. In 1953 the bear image was standardized by Donald Greame Kelley, he based it on the 1855 watercolor by Charles Christian Nahl. The 1953 law includes an official black and white rendering of the bear as well as the plot of grass and brown tufts. This drawing and other specifications that define the flag's colors and dimensions are identified as "54-J-03".

The Californian flag is one of two U.S. state flags to depict a bear, along with Missouri.

In 2001, the North American Vexillological Association surveyed its members on the designs of the 72 U.S. state, U.S. territorial, and Canadian provincial flags and ranked the flag of California 13th out of 50 U.S. states, and the best flag that contains words, specifically the state's name.

Metrics for the flag of California

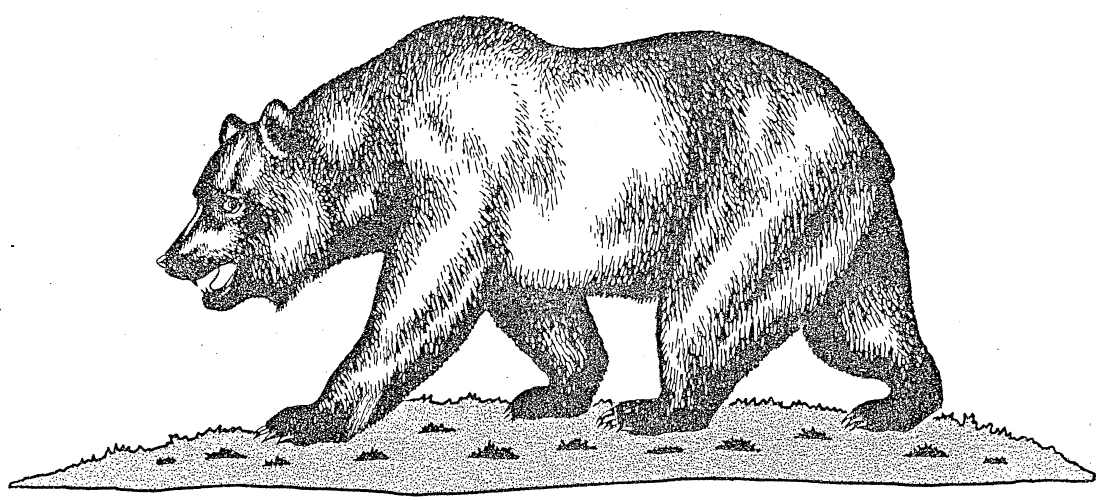
The accepted official rendering of the bear

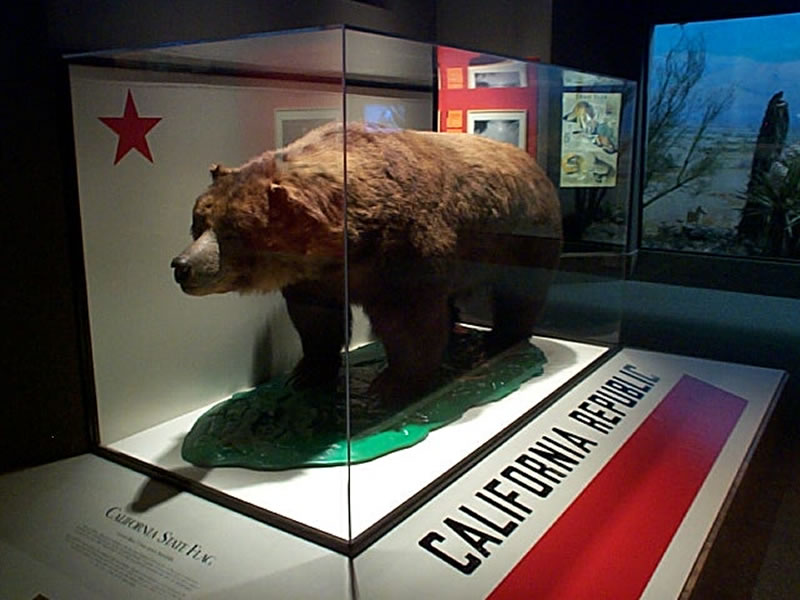
"Monarch" the bear

=== Colors ===
Vertical display

The 1953 legislation defined the exact shades of the California flag with a total of five colors (including the white field) relative to the 9th edition of the Standard Color Card of America (now called the Standard Color Reference of America). It is one of only four US state flags not to include the color blue, along with Alabama, Maryland, and New Mexico.

Color	Cable no.	Pantone	Web color	RGB values
White	70001	Safe	#FFFFFF	(255,255,255)
Old Glory Red	70180	200	#BA0C2F	(186,12,47)
Maple Sugar	70129	729C	#B58150	(181,129,80)
Seal	70108	462C	#5C462B	(92,70,43)
Irish Green	70168	348	#00843D	(0,132,61)

- Seal is used for the dark shading of the bear, the 12 darker tufts in the plot of grass, the border of the plot and the lettering "CALIFORNIA REPUBLIC".
- Maple Sugar is the base color for the bear.
- Old Glory Red is used for the star, the bear's tongue and the red stripe at the bottom of the flag.
- Irish Green is used for the grass plot.
- The bear's claws are also accented with white. The left front and rear paws have four white claws while the right rear claw displays three. The front right paw does not contain highlighting.

== History ==
=== Flag of Moctezuma ===
In 1823 the Spanish left California and all of the land was given to Mexico. Soon many of the locals felt neglected by the new government. In 1827 Governor José María de Echeandía proposed to change the name of the province from Alta California to Moctezuma, after the Aztec emperor Moctezuma I. He said that they should lower the Mexican flag and raised a new flag to show support for independence. The flag was described as: "...a white field with a blue oval in the center, with an Indian inside wearing a feathered headdress and carrying a bow and a quiver of arrows, stepping across the Bering Strait...The Oval would be supported by an olive tree...and a oak tree..." The moment ended when Mexico approved their Territorial Deputation.

=== Lone Star of California ===
The lone star of the 1836 California Lone Star Flag used by Juan Bautista Alvarado, which inspired the red star in the flag of the Bear Flag Revolt.

In 1836, a coup led by Juan Alvarado declared Alta California's independence from Mexico. Alvarado declared himself governor of the territory and raised a banner with the inscription: "FEDERATION OR DEATH." Alvarado soon recruited U.S. frontiersmen led by Isaac Graham, to support him. The rebels easily captured the capital Monterey, but were unable to convince southern leaders such as Juan Bandini and Carlos Antonio Carrillo to join the rebellion. Faced with a civil war, Alvarado and the other Californios negotiated a compromise with the central government wherein California's leaders accepted its status as a "department" under the "Siete Leyes" Mexican constitution of 1836, in return for more local control. Alvarado was appointed governor the next year.

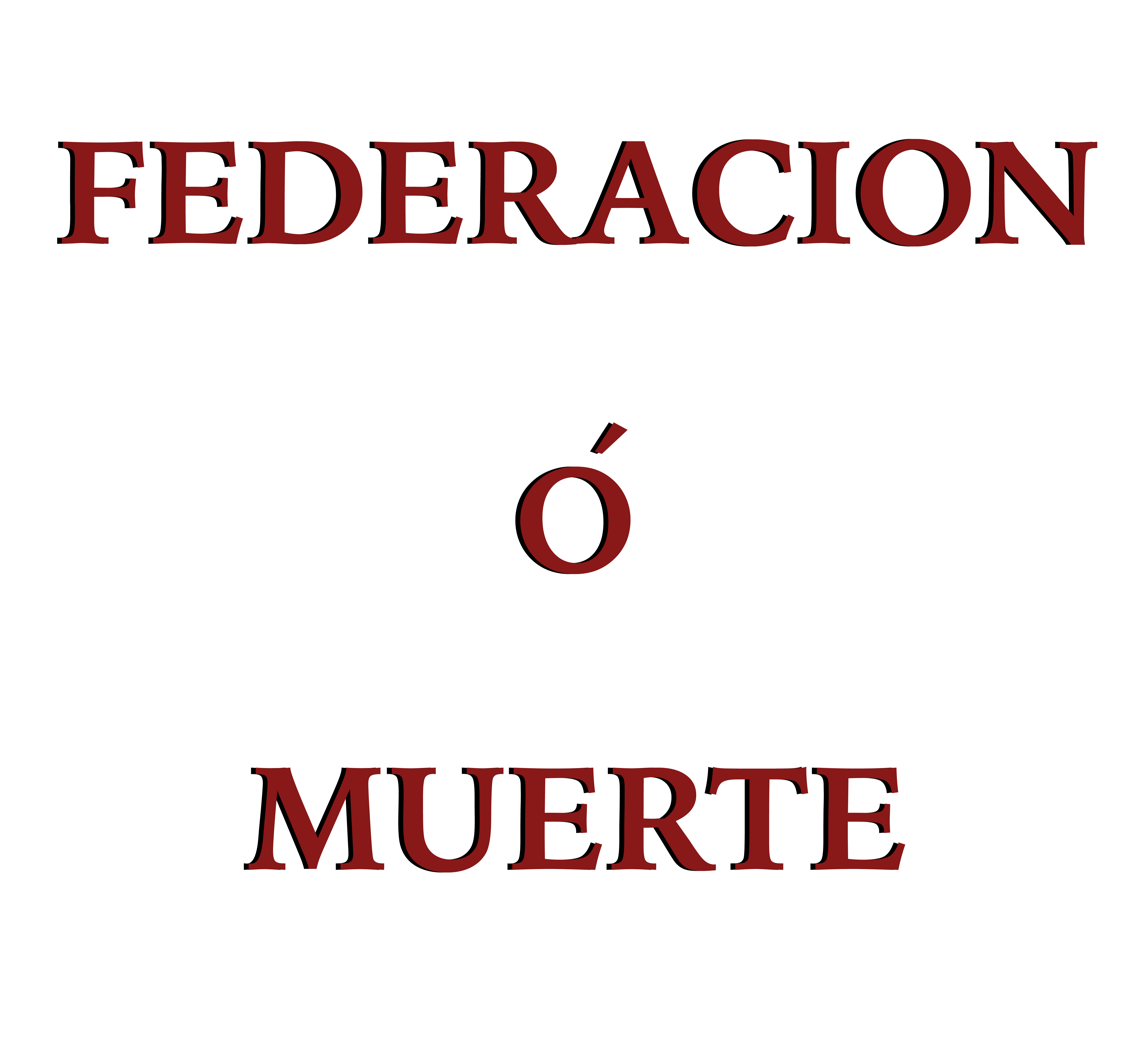
The banner carried by Alvarado after he declared himself governor

The Lone Star Flag of California, associated with Alvarado's rebellion, contained a single red star on a white background. It was raised on December 18, 1836. One last original flag is archived at the Autry National Center.

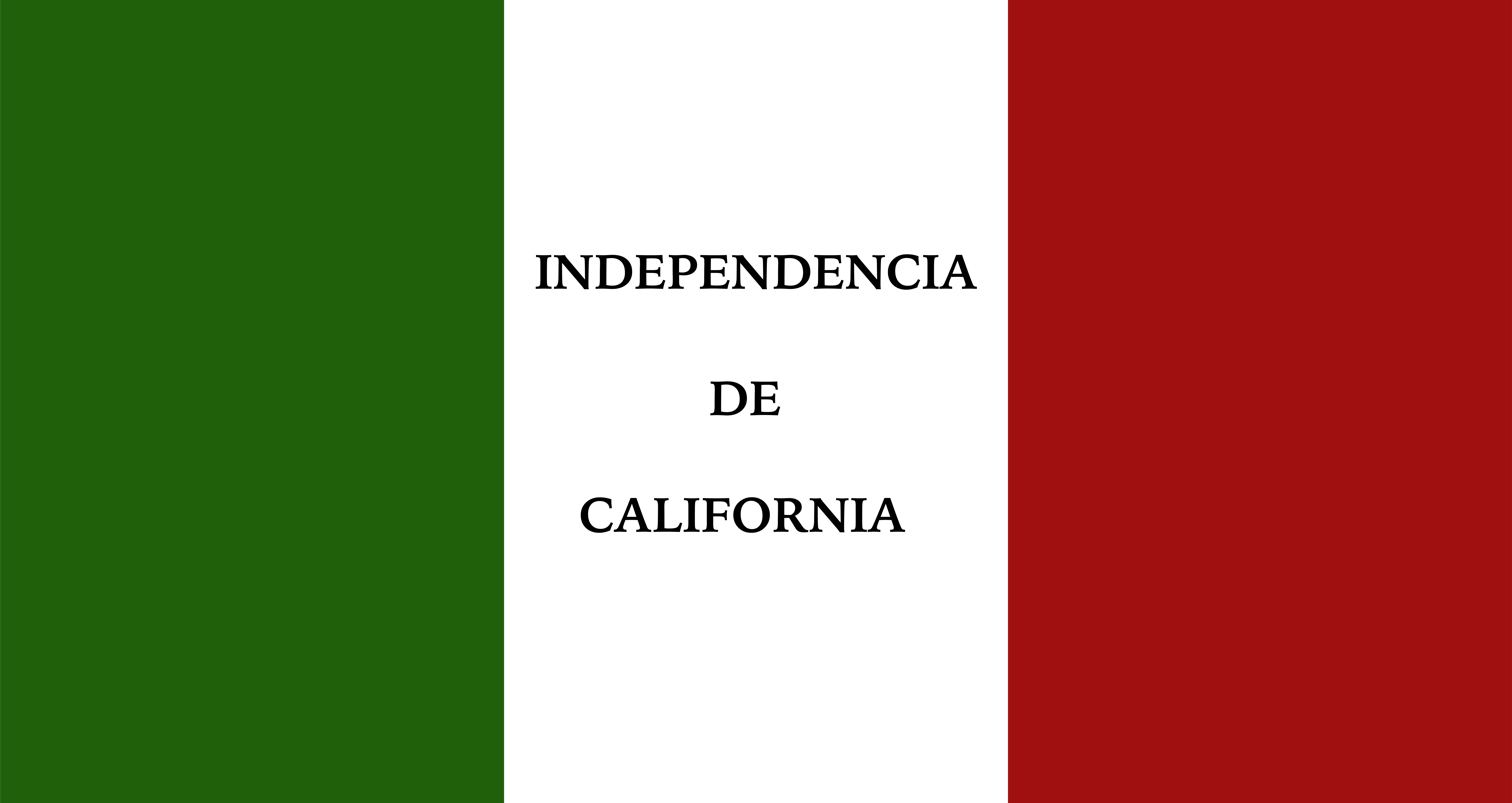
The Mission Independence flag, 1837

In January 1837 a small army led by Alvarado was heading through the town of Santa Barbara when he got the idea of making a flag. He ordered his men to bring him a Mexican flag and in the white stripe he wrote "Independence for California." The flag was given to Father Duran of the local Mission to be blessed. A year later it was carried by Alvarado's men in the Battle of San Buenaventura and raised over the Mission after the affair. During the battle of San Juan Capistrano, Captain Salvador Vallejo carried with him a massive white flag with a large red scroll with the inscription: "IF OUR ENEMIES DO NOT SURRENDER, I SHALL HAVE THEM BEHEADED!"

=== Original Bear Flag ===
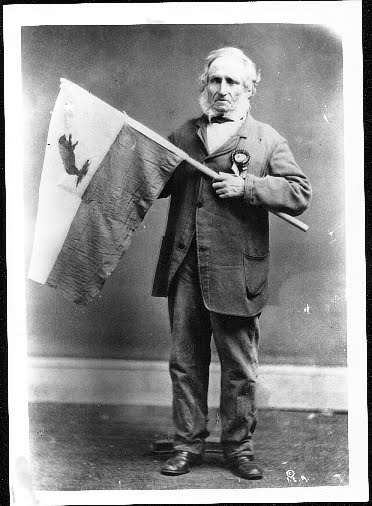
The original grizzly bear flag with its designer, Peter Storm, c. 1870

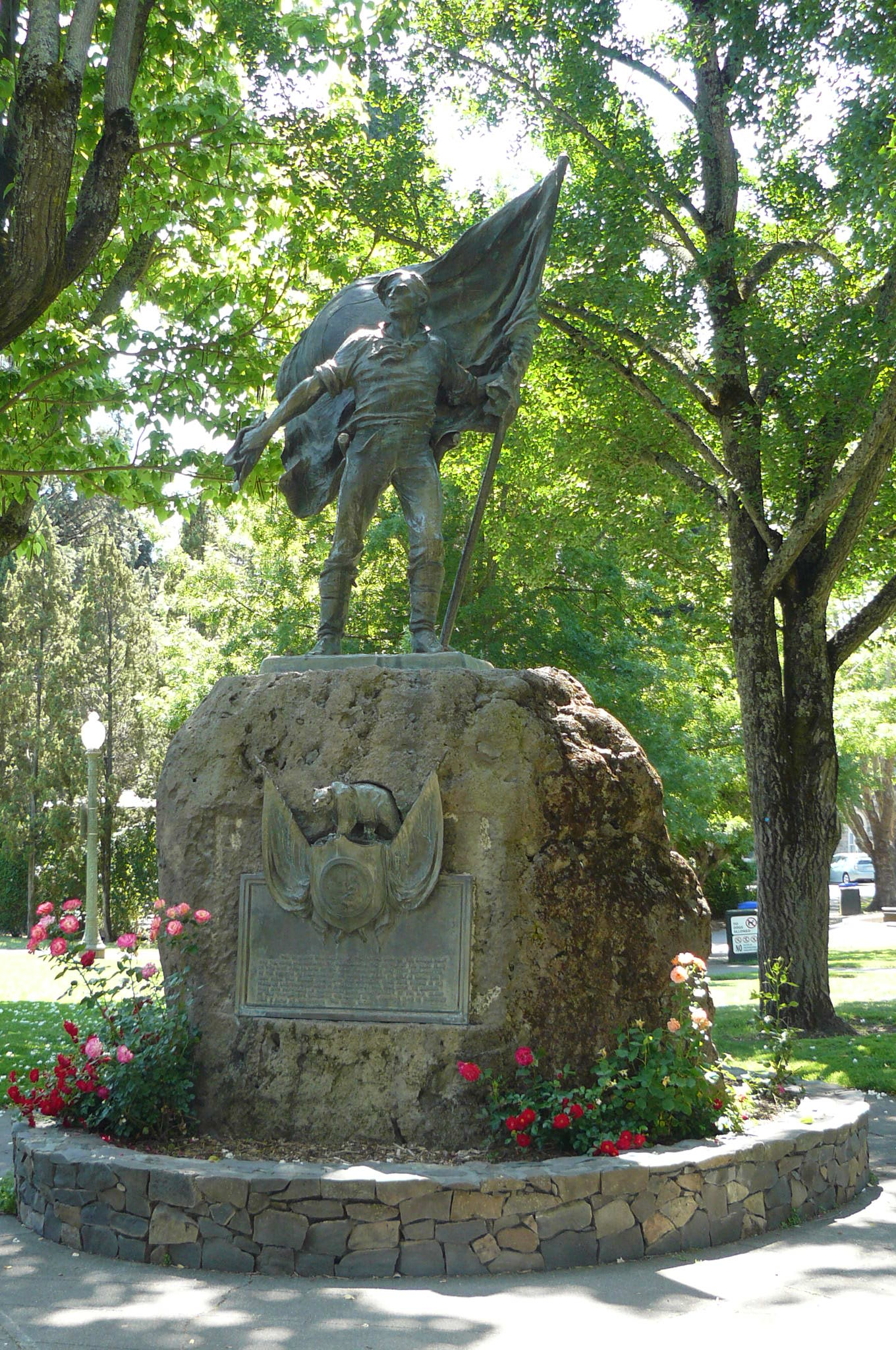
Bear Flag monument on the Sonoma Plaza

The original grizzly bear flag was created by Peter Storm. A version of this bear flag, designed by William L. Todd, a cousin of Mary Todd Lincoln, was raised in Sonoma, California, in June 1846 on a date between the 14th and the 17th, by the men who became known as the "Bear Flaggers", including William B. Ide. The exact creation date is at least somewhat unclear. However, U.S. Naval Lieutenant John Missroon reported the flag's existence as of June 17, 1846.

According to the book Flags Over California, published by the California Military Department, the star on the flag recalled the 1836 California Lone Star Flag. Todd, in an 1878 letter to the Los Angeles Express, states that the star was drawn using blackberry juice and in recognition of the California Lone Star Flag. The bear was designed to be a symbol of strength and unyielding resistance.

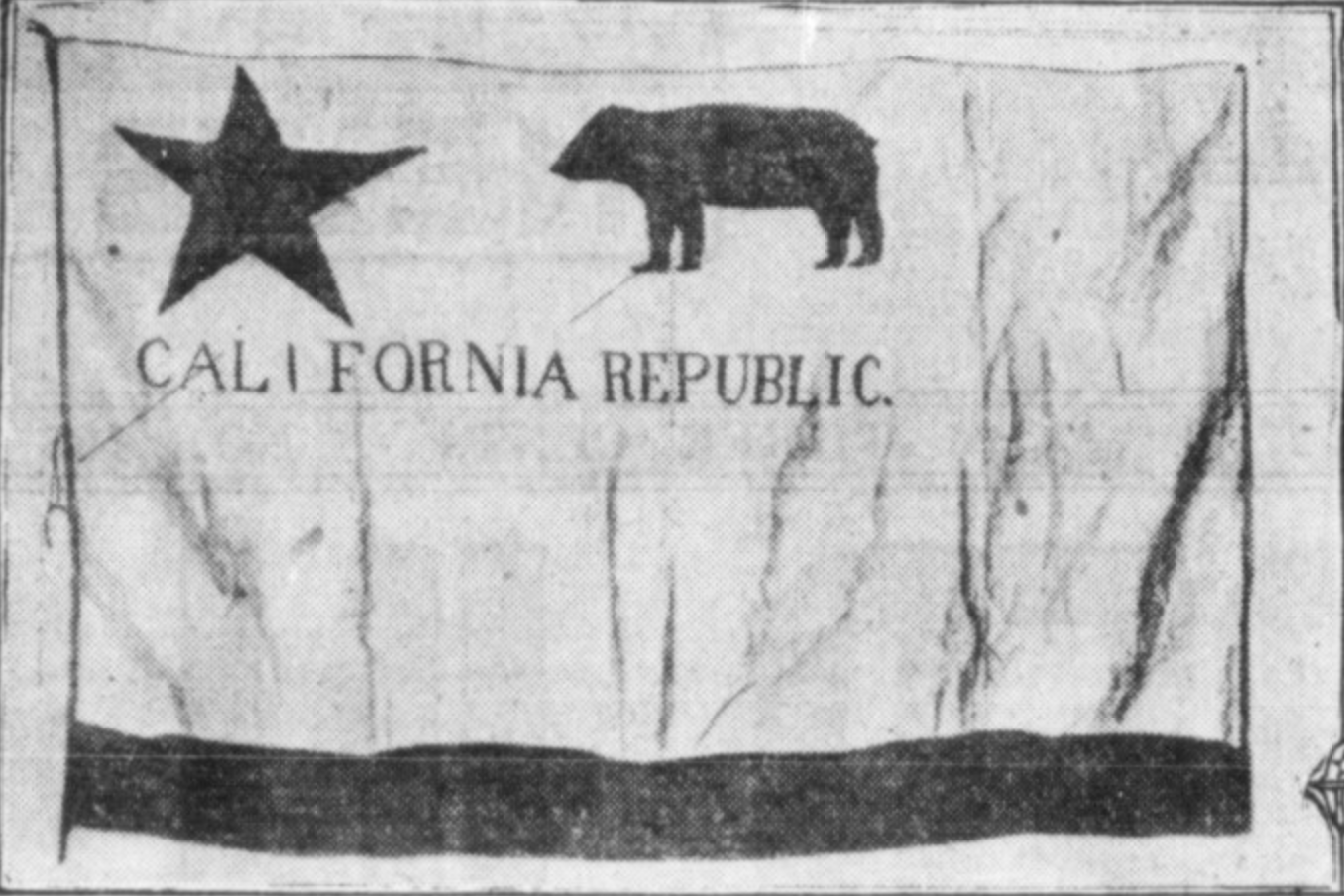
Original Bear Flag of the 1846 revolt, designed by William L. Todd

According to the Sonoma State Historic Park, the construction of the flag was described as such:

At a company meeting it was determined that we should raise a flag and that it should be a bear en passant [a heraldry term signifying that the bear is walking toward the viewer's left], with one star. One of the ladies at the garrison gave us a piece of brown domestic, and Mrs. Captain John Sears gave us some strips of red flannel about 4 inches (100 mm) wide. The domestic was new, but the flannel was said to have been part of a petticoat worn by Mrs. Sears across the mountains...I took a pen, and with ink drew the outline of the bear and star upon the white cloth. Linseed oil and Venetian red were found in the garrison, and I painted the bear and star...Underneath the bear and star were printed with a pen the words 'California Republic' in Roman letters. In painting the words I first lined out the letters with a pen, leaving out the letter 'i' and putting 'c' where 'i' should have been, and afterwards the 'i' over the 'c'. It was made with ink, and we had nothing to remove the marks.

The original Bear Flag and the republic it symbolized had a brief career, from about June 14 until July 9. On July 7, 1846, Commodore John Drake Sloat of the United States Navy's Pacific Squadron first raised the 28-star American flag at Monterey, the capital of Alta California, and claimed the territory for the United States.

Two days later, on July 9, 1846, Navy Lieutenant Joseph Warren Revere arrived in Sonoma and hauled down the Bear Flag, running up in its place the Stars and Stripes. The Bear Flag was given to young John E. Montgomery (son of Commander John B. Montgomery of USS Portsmouth), who would later write in a letter to his mother "Cuffy came down growling"—"Cuffy" being his nickname for the bear on the flag.

The Bear Flag given to young Montgomery returned with USS Portsmouth to the east coast of the U.S. in 1848, but in 1855 was returned to California. The flag was given to California's two senators, John B. Weller and William M. Gwin. This flag was donated to the Society of California Pioneers on September 8, 1855, and was preserved at the Society's Pioneer Halls in San Francisco until it was destroyed on April 18, 1906, in the fires that followed the great San Francisco earthquake. According to the New-York Daily Tribune, a facsimile likeness of the flag was sent to the Fremont Club of Northampton, Massachusetts in 1856 by the society to show support for John C. Fremont during the presidential election.

Today, a replica hangs on display in the Sonoma Barracks, or El Presidio de Sonoma. There is also a statue in the plaza at Sonoma, California, commemorating the raising of the flag, the Bear Flag Monument.

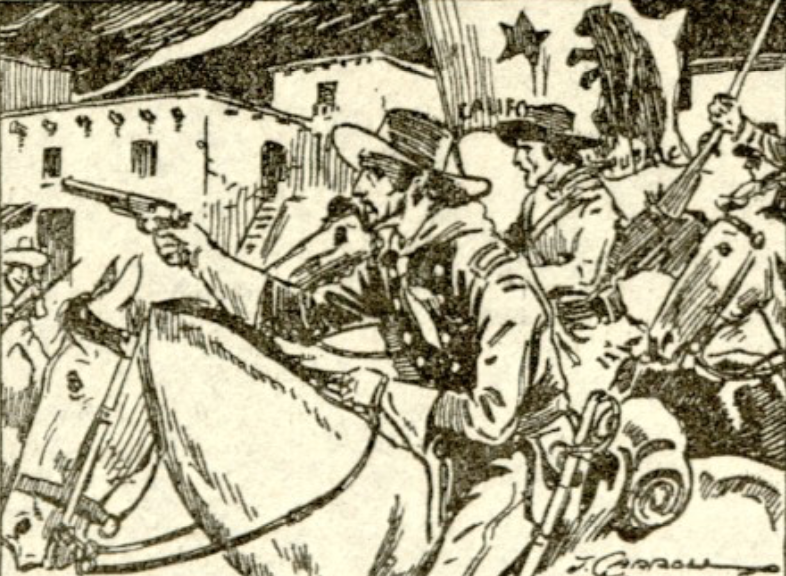
Depiction of a standing bear used during the revolt

=== Other Bear Flags ===
There are many accounts of other bear flags being made during the revolt. Each flag has a different design, most with a bear as the central figure either in brown or black. Some having a standing bear while others had it on all fours. Almost all having a star either in purple, red, brown or black. Most of the accounts were made years afters the revolt.

I have no doubt that within the next ten days [from June 14, 1846] there were a dozen Bear Flags made and floated. Every one who had a boat, store, or public place, desired them, and many of them made Bear Flags.

— George W. Williams

An early Republic flag, per description

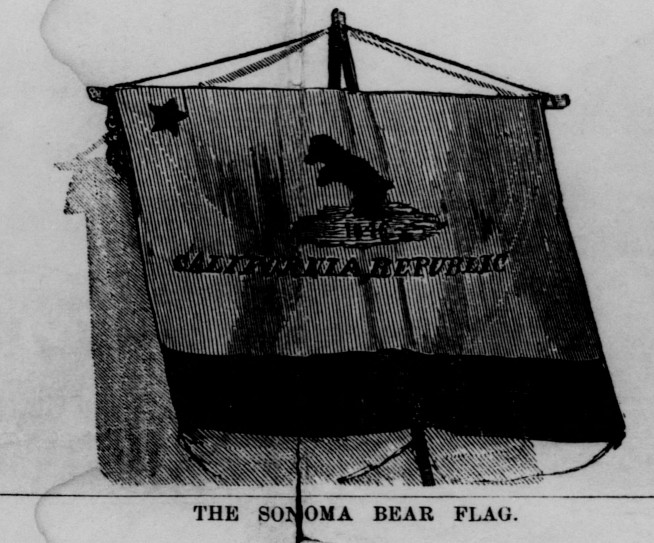
Etching of a Bear flag flown in Sonoma in 1846

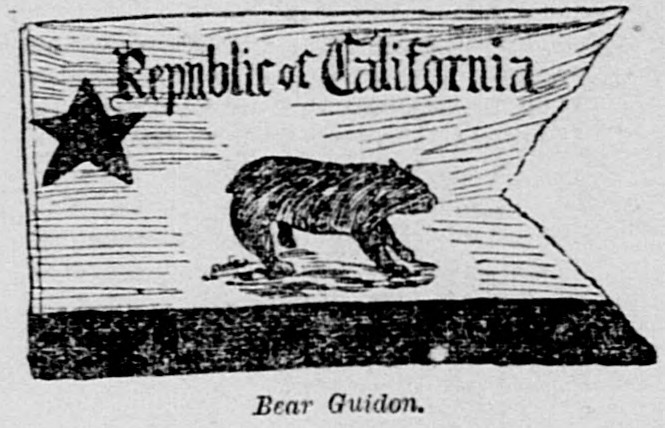
"The Bear Flag Guidon". Carried by the California Battalion

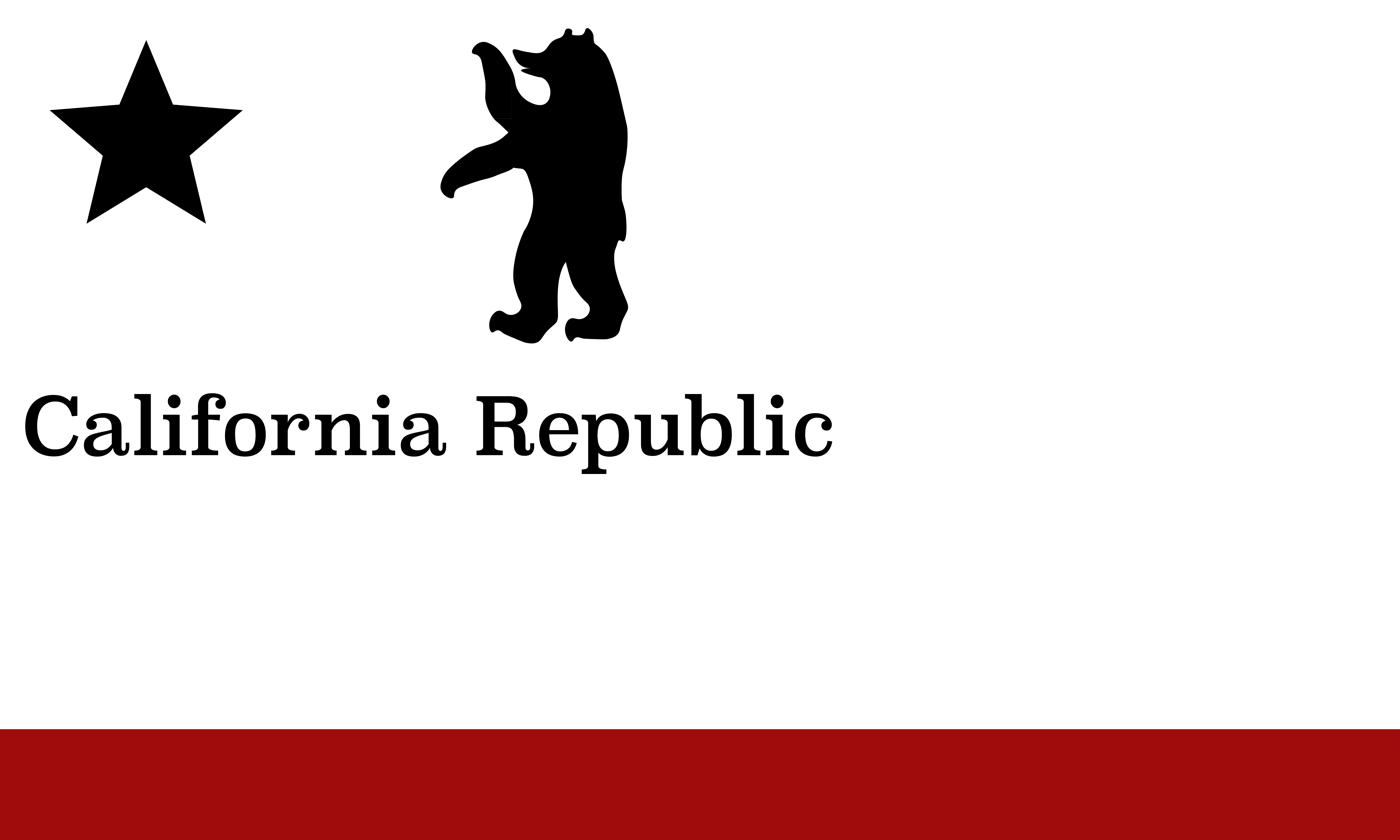
The Bear Flag as described by Hubert Howe Bancroft

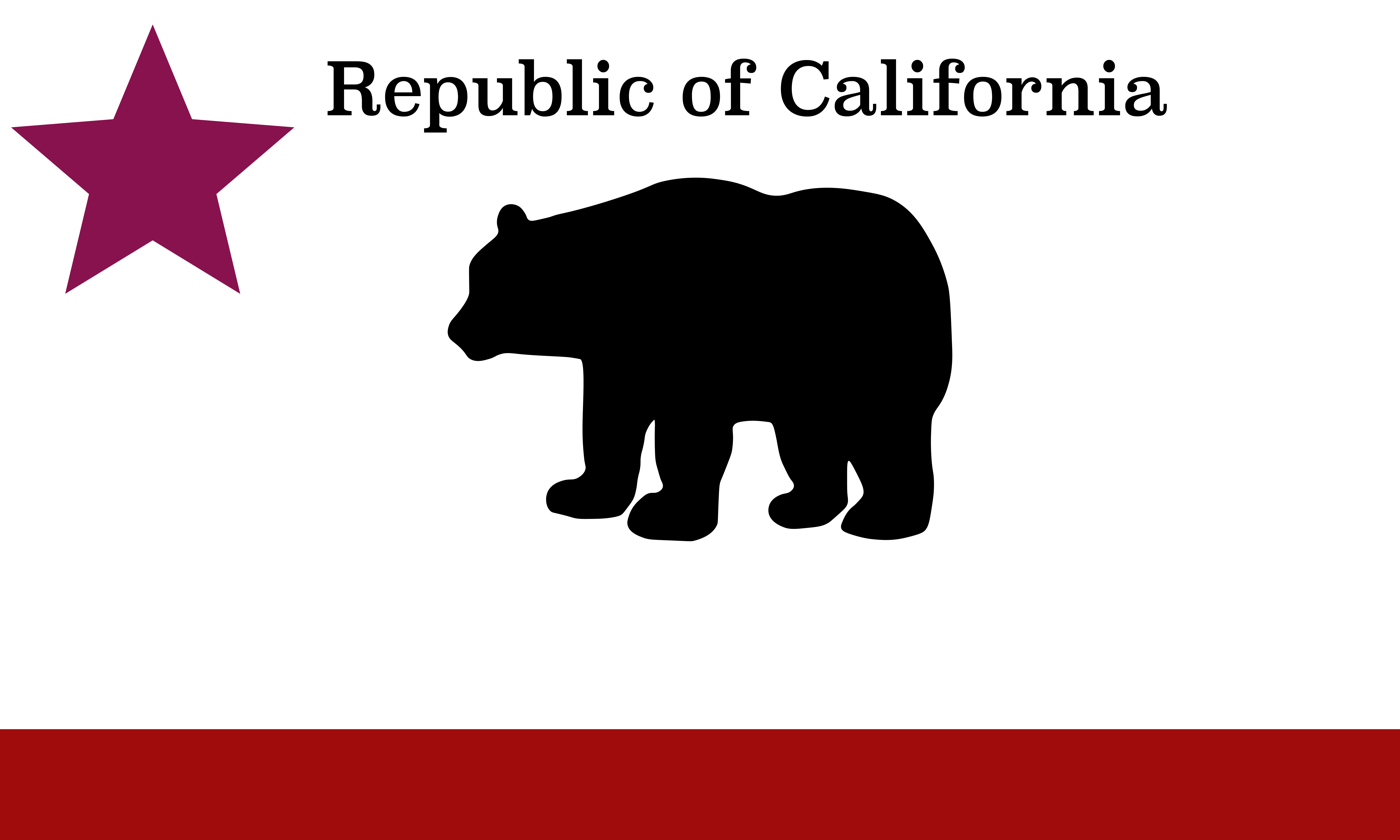
The Bear Flag as described by the Sacramento Daily Union

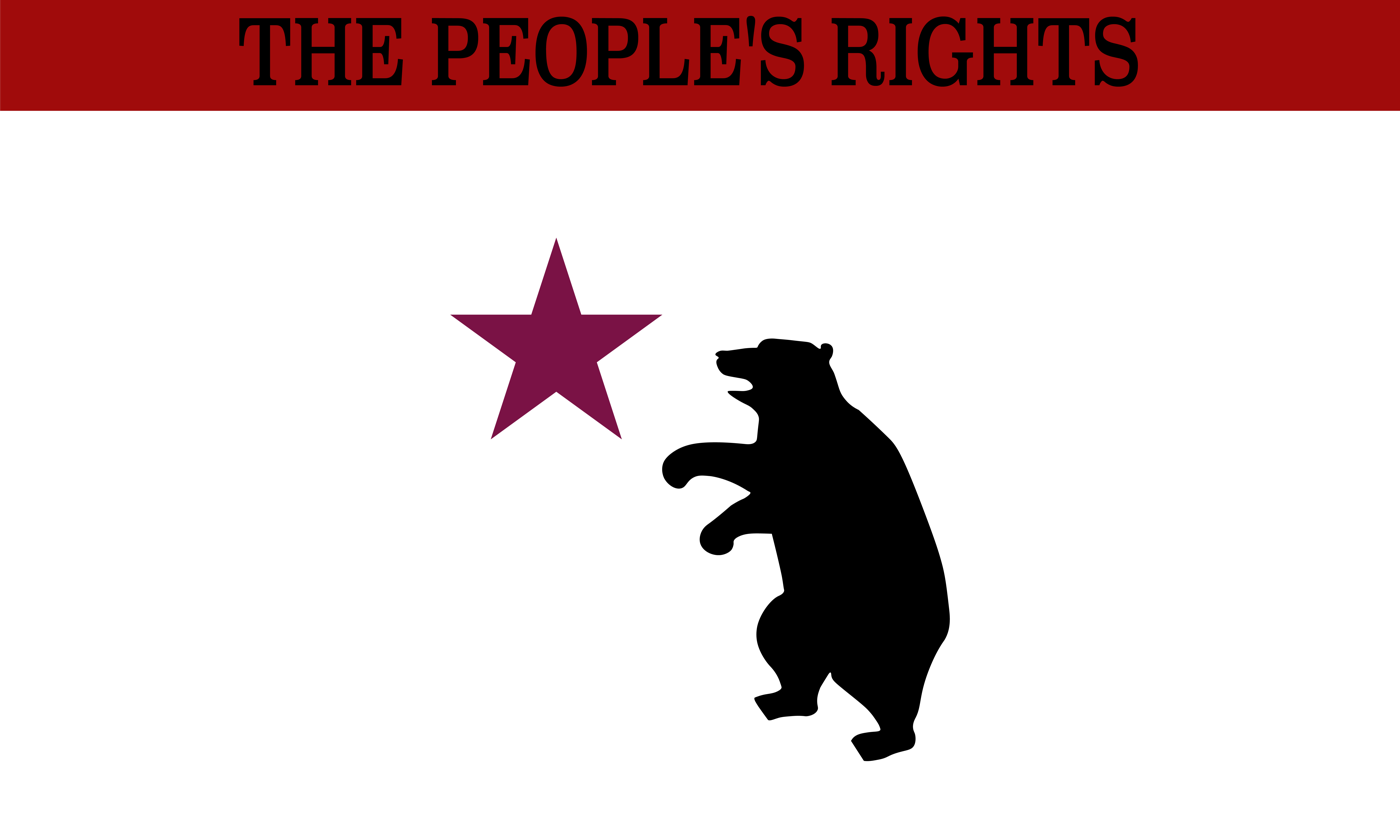
The Bear Flag as described by the Sacramento Transcript

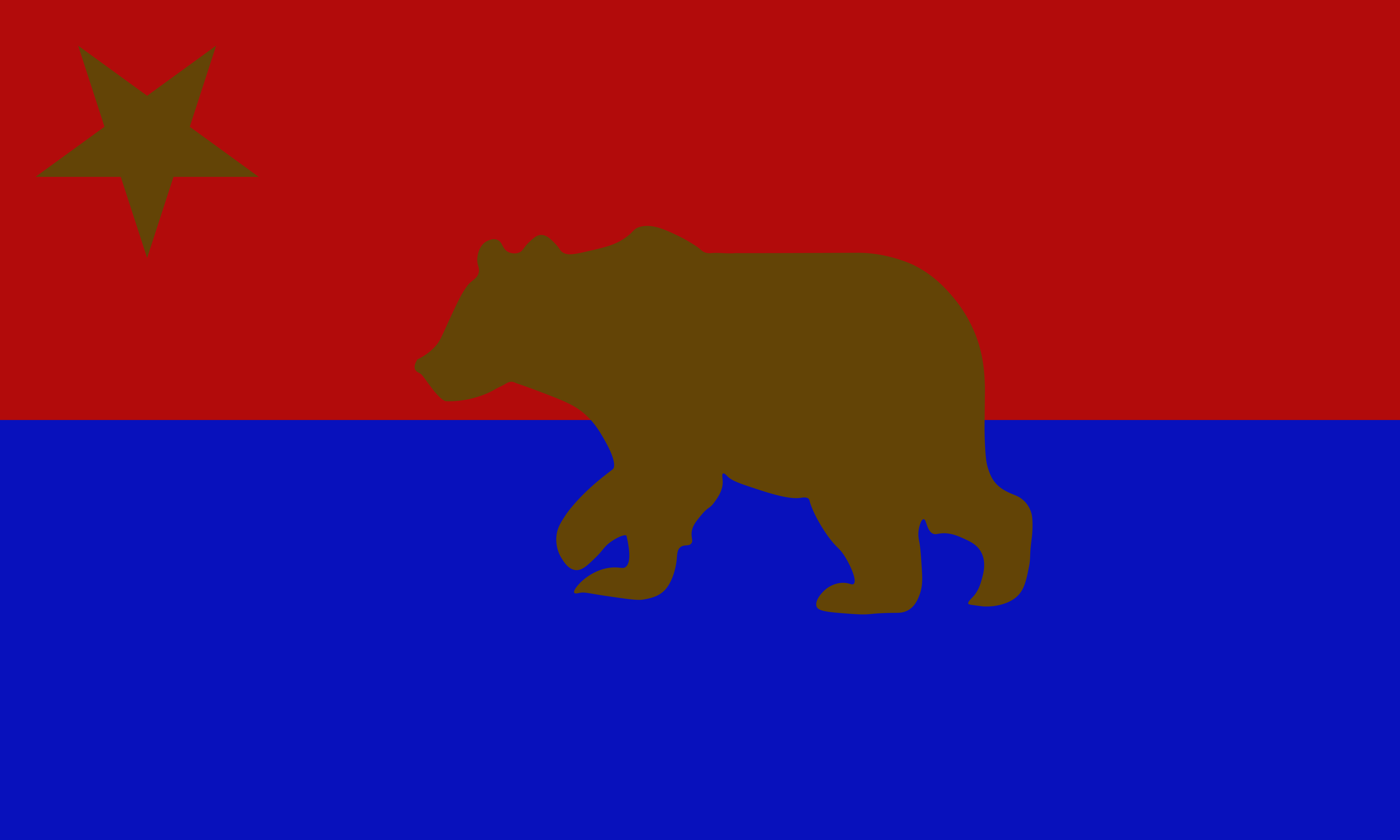
The Bear Flag according to Porterfield's account

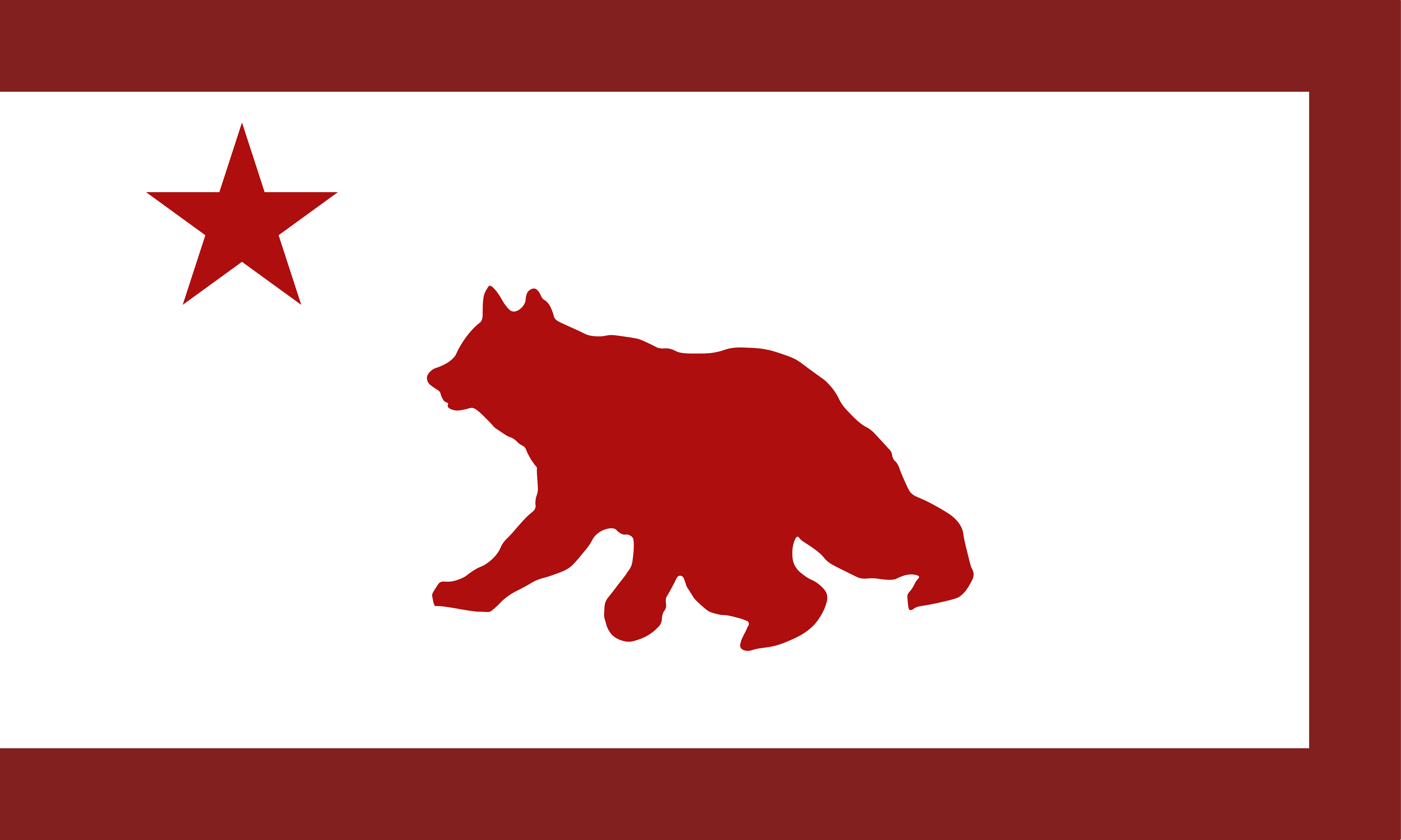
The Bear Flag according to Lindsay's account

The Bear Flag according to Alexander Todd's account

The Bear Flag according to Bradshaw's account (the biggest Bear Flag made during the revolt, measuring ca 6 feet (1.8 m) wide and 13 feet (4 m) long)

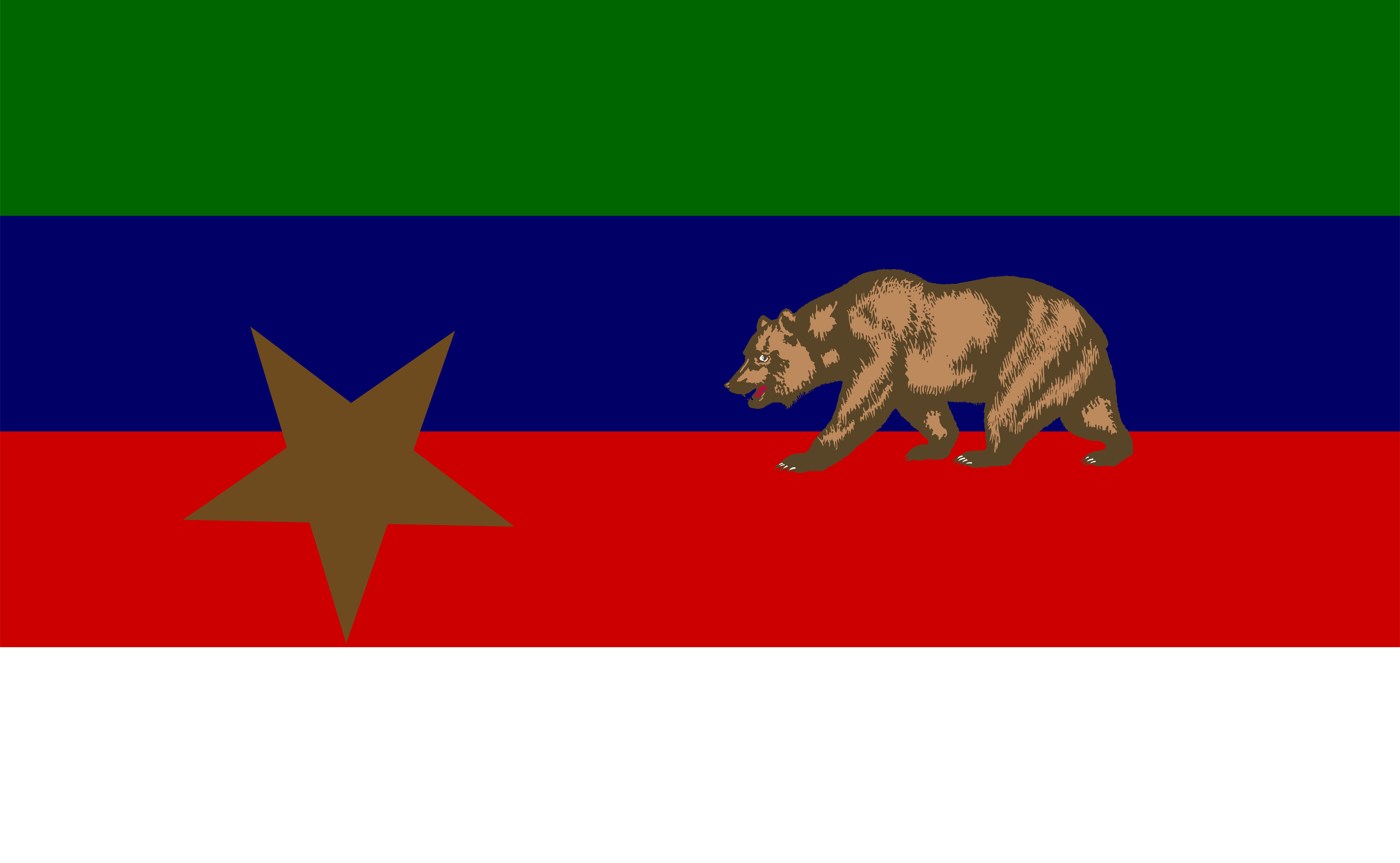
The Bear Flag as described in the Bettmann Archive

A year after the revolt American settlers in Sacramento Valley wanted to celebrate the 4th of July by raising a national flag. The party did not have one, so they started gathering material to make an improvised American flag. It was described as: "...small square of heavy cloth, light blue in color, upon which is pasted a white paper star of eight points, while a piece of paper is pasted along the top bar with the following motto written upon it: " California is ours as long as the stars remain."

=== 1850s ===
Digital reconstruction of California's first state flag, c. 1850 (based off description)

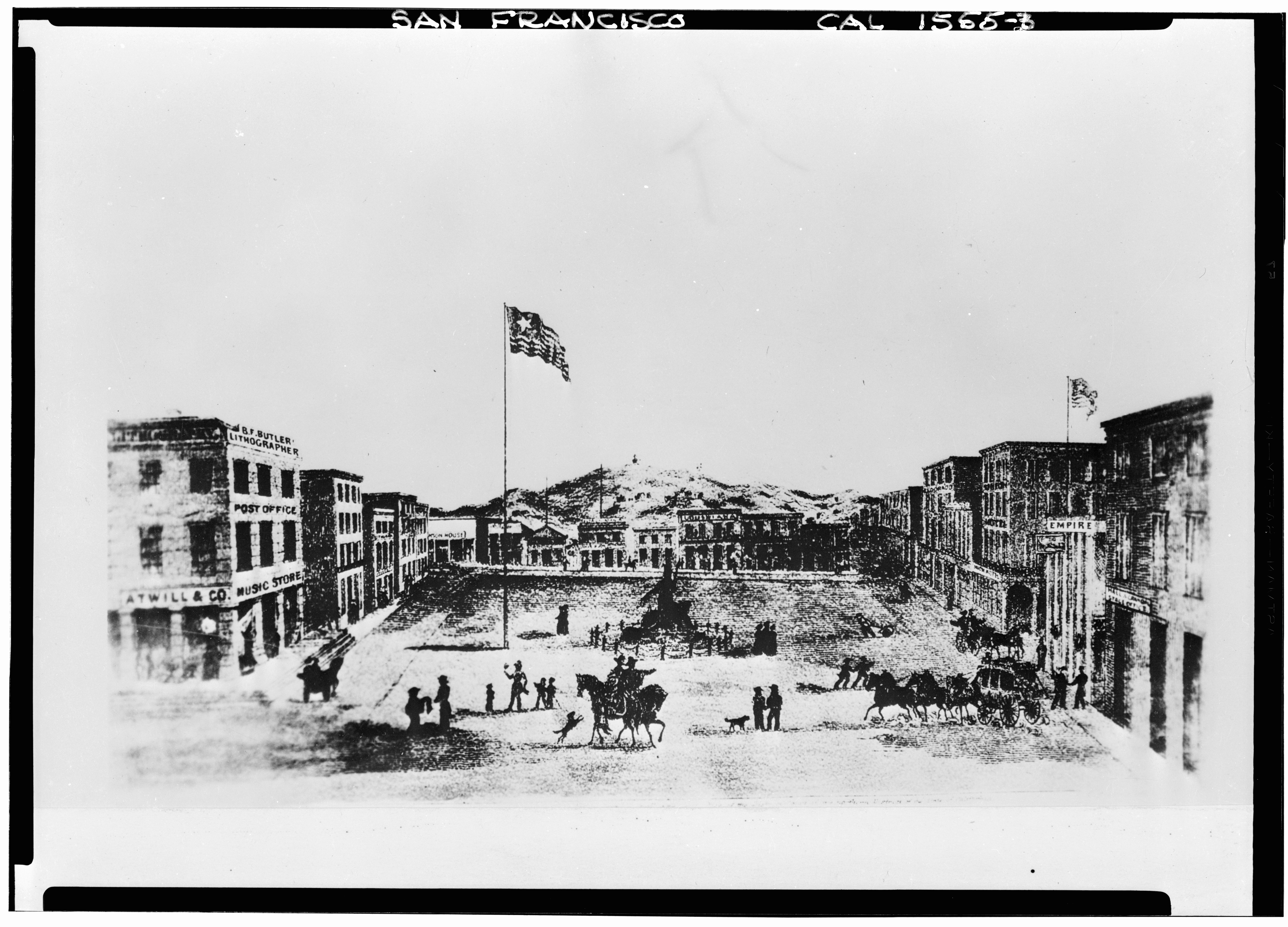
Portsmouth Square c. 1850

On October 18, 1850, the mail steamer Oregon entered the bay with a large streamer flown from her mast. It bore the inscription "CALIFORNIA IS A STATE" with a large 5 pointed star at the end. It also flew an American flag with 31 stars on it, the flag was made in New York.

On September 9, 1850, San Franciscans celebrated California's admission to the union with a parade. From the flagpole in Portsmouth Square they flew an American flag with one large star that represented the state. Another flag flown to celebrated California's statehood was the first state flag. The flag contained the state seal in the center of its field, with it being painted by William Henry Powell. The whole thing measuring at 8 feet (2.5 m) wide and 12 feet (3.7 m) long.

From 1850-1858 people across the country started flying the American flags with their 31 stars arranged in the "Grand Luminary" pattern. This is when the stars in the canton are arranged to make one big star.

During the 1856 presidential election supporters of Republican nominee Fremont raised a Bear Flag in San Francisco, also one raised in Marysville but with the names: "Fremont and Dayton," on it.

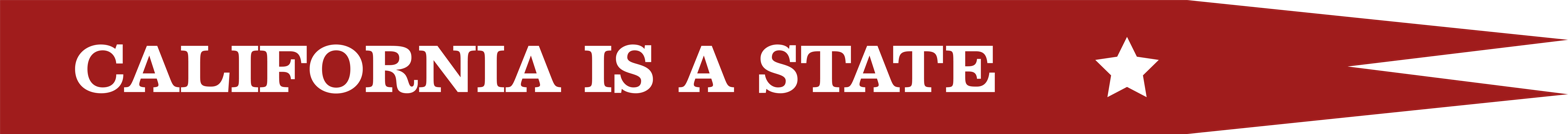
Streamer flown by the Oregon, 1850

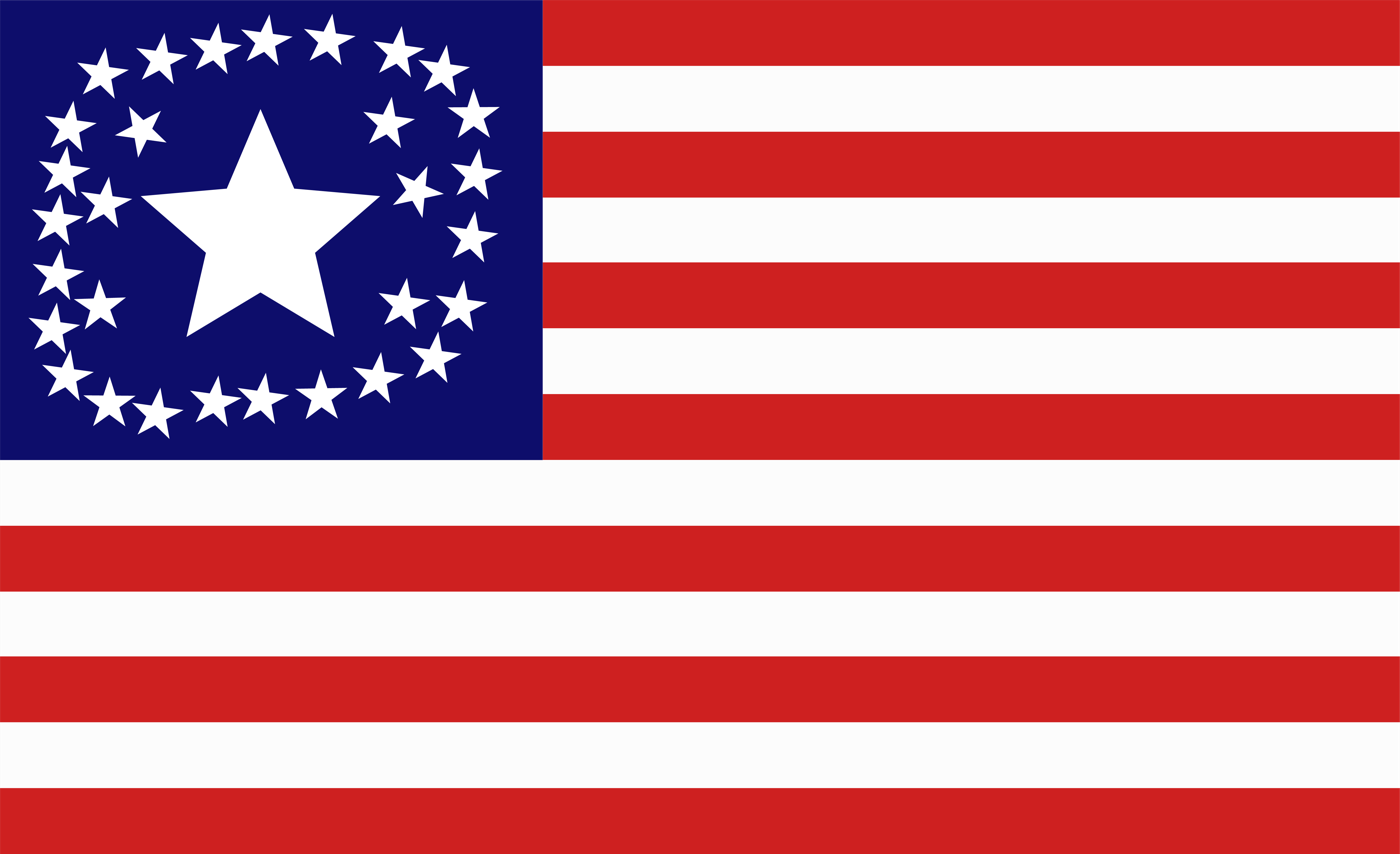
31 star American flag flown from the Oregon, 1850

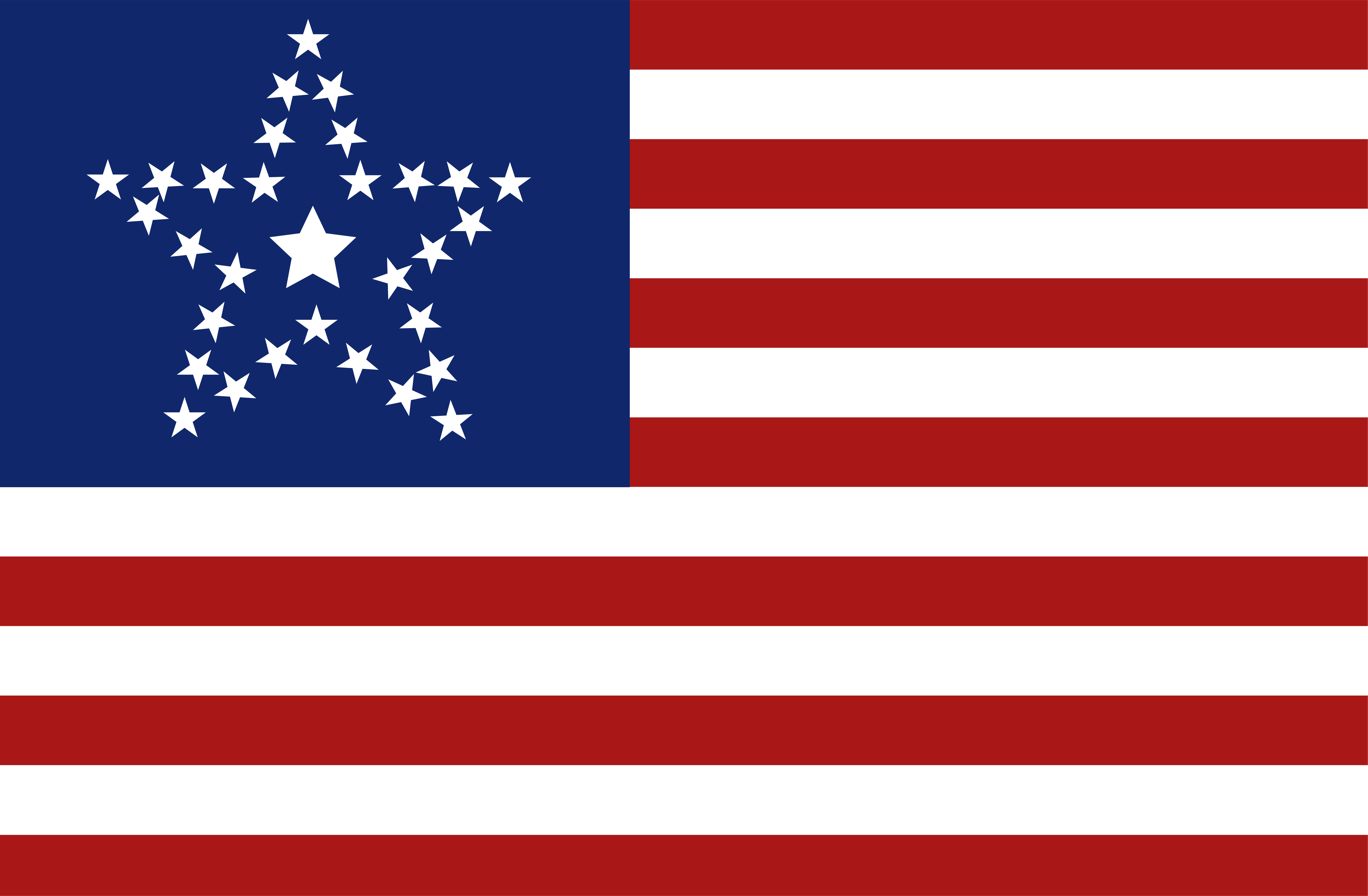
Digital remake of a 31 star American flag with a Grand Luminary star pattern

Digital remake of the "Lone Star" flag flown on admission day in San Francisco

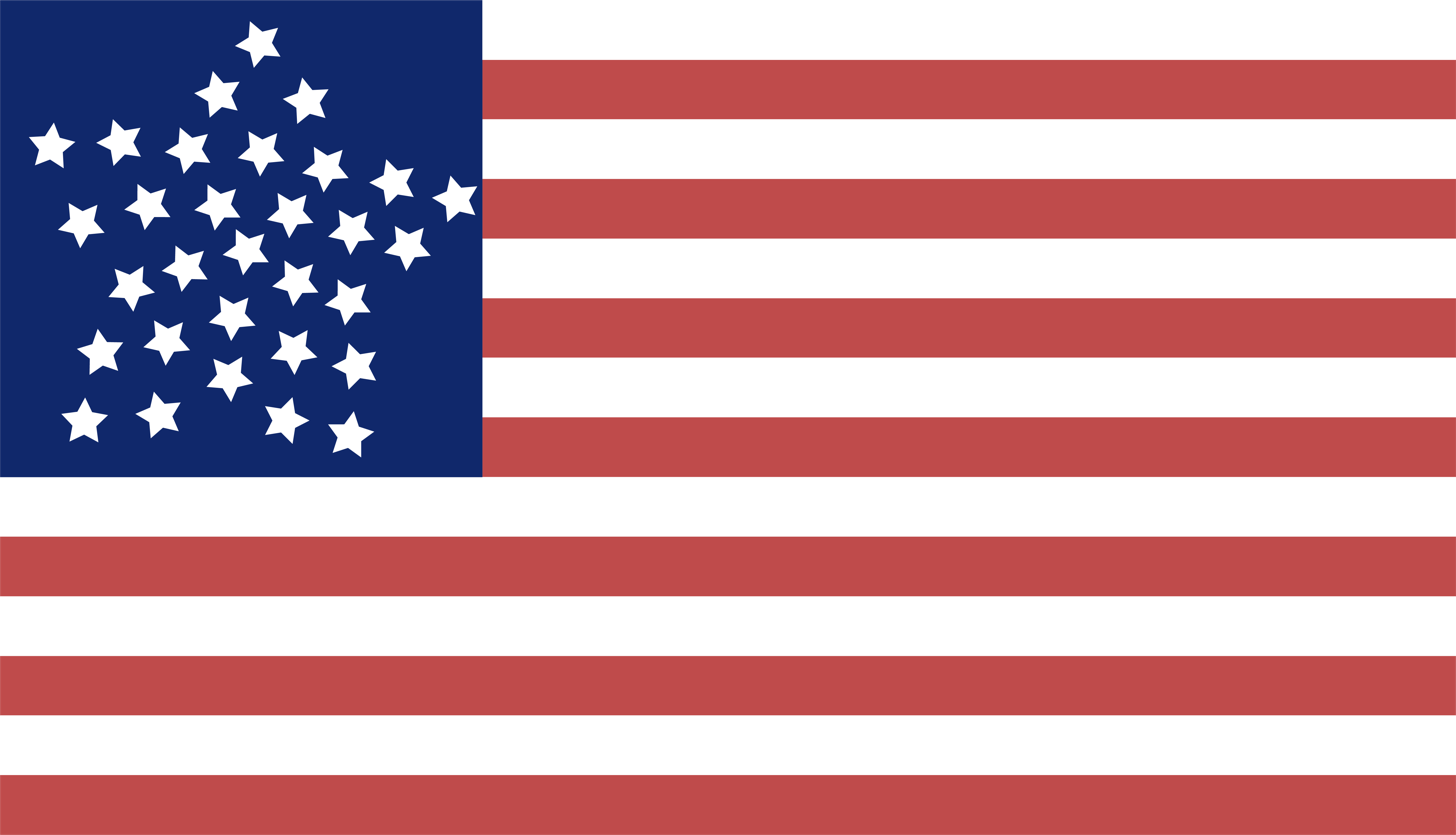
Digital remake of an American flag with a Grand Luminary star pattern and 14 stripes, it flew on admission day

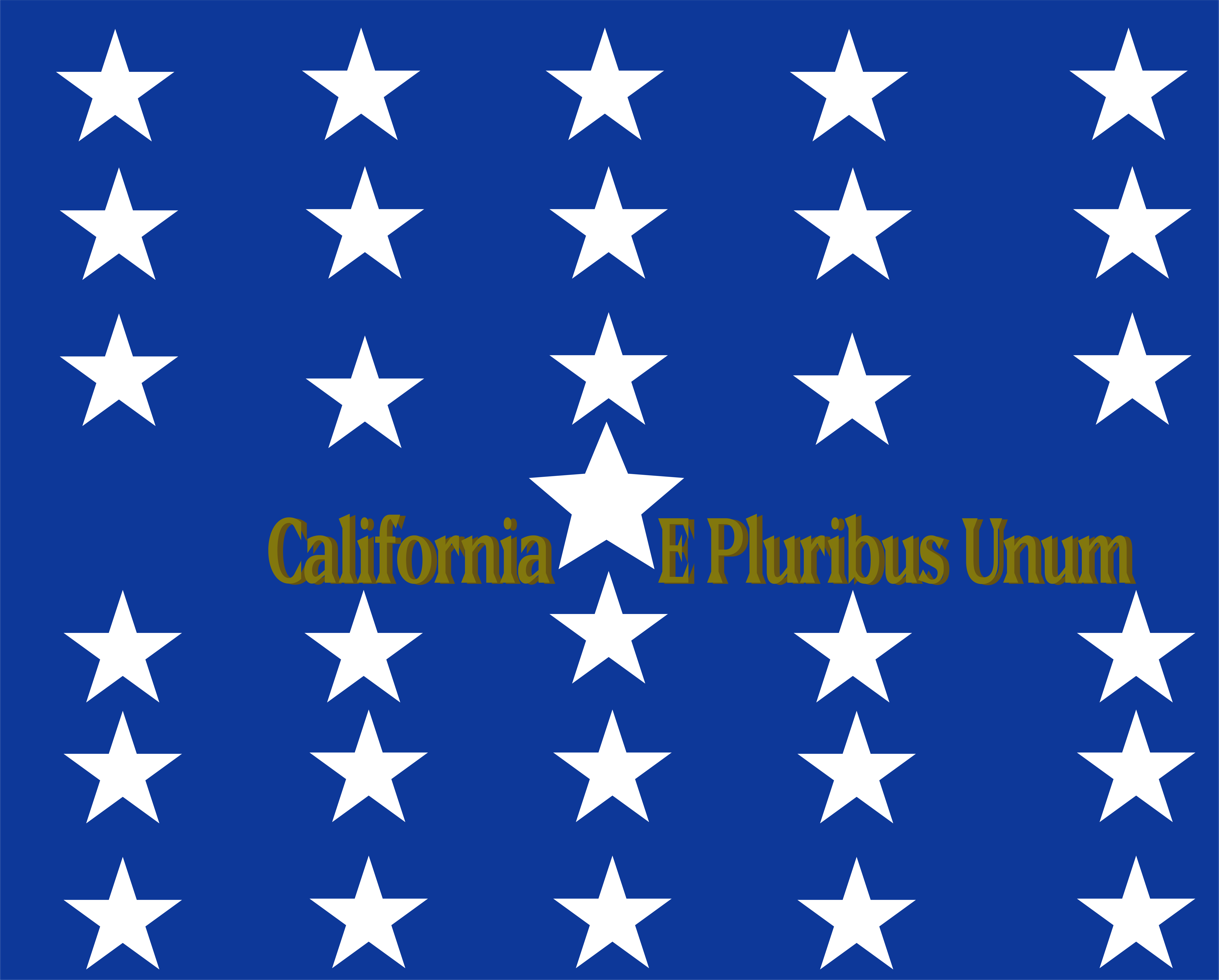
Digital reconstruction of the flag carried by Californios in San Francisco during the admission day parade. Based on a written description

Digital reconstruction of a unique 31 star American flag with red & yellow stripes, 1851

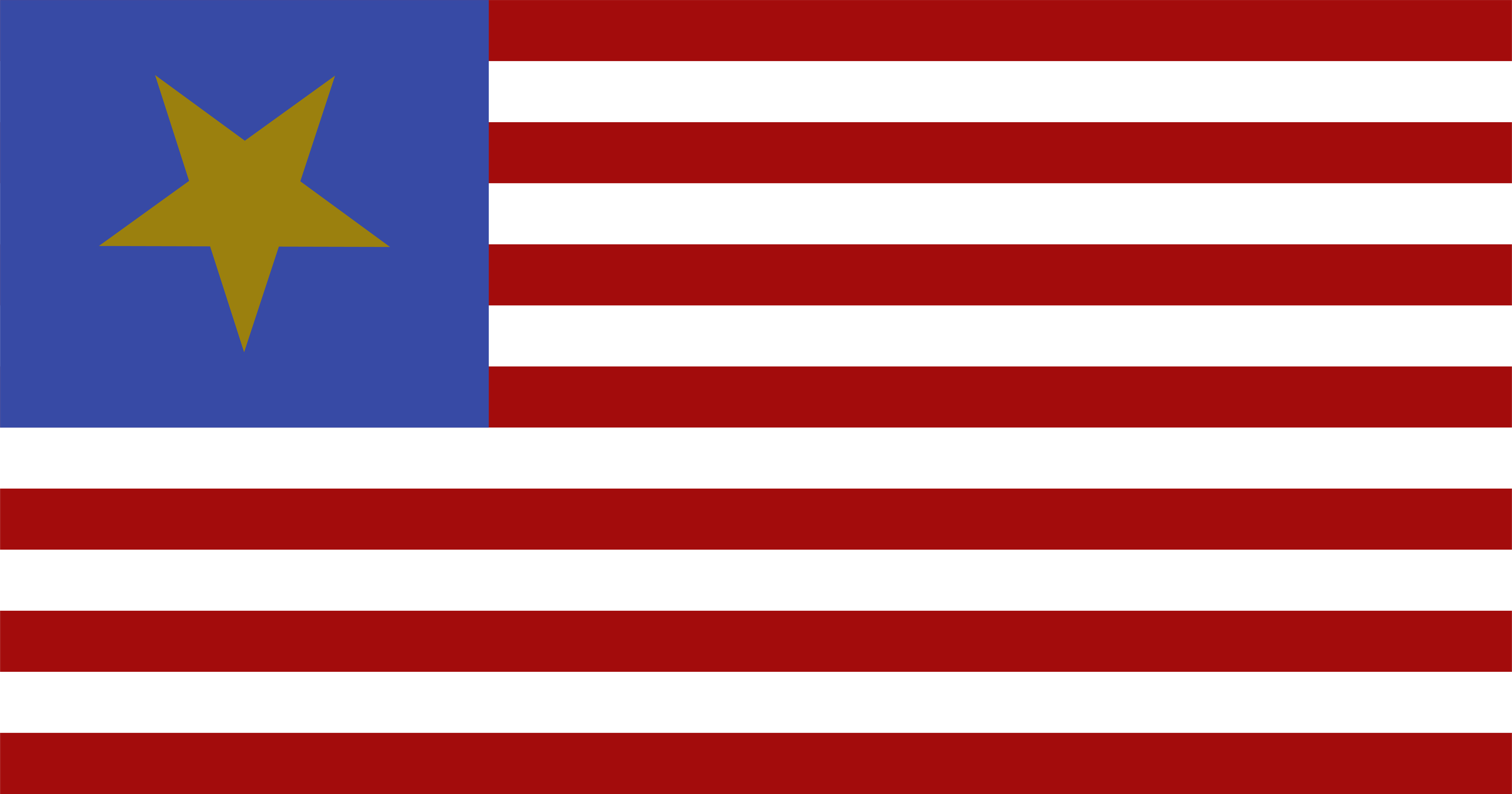
Digital reconstruction of the "Lone Star" flag flown in Plumas County on July 4, 1852. It was described by Louise Clappe

=== The Civil War period ===
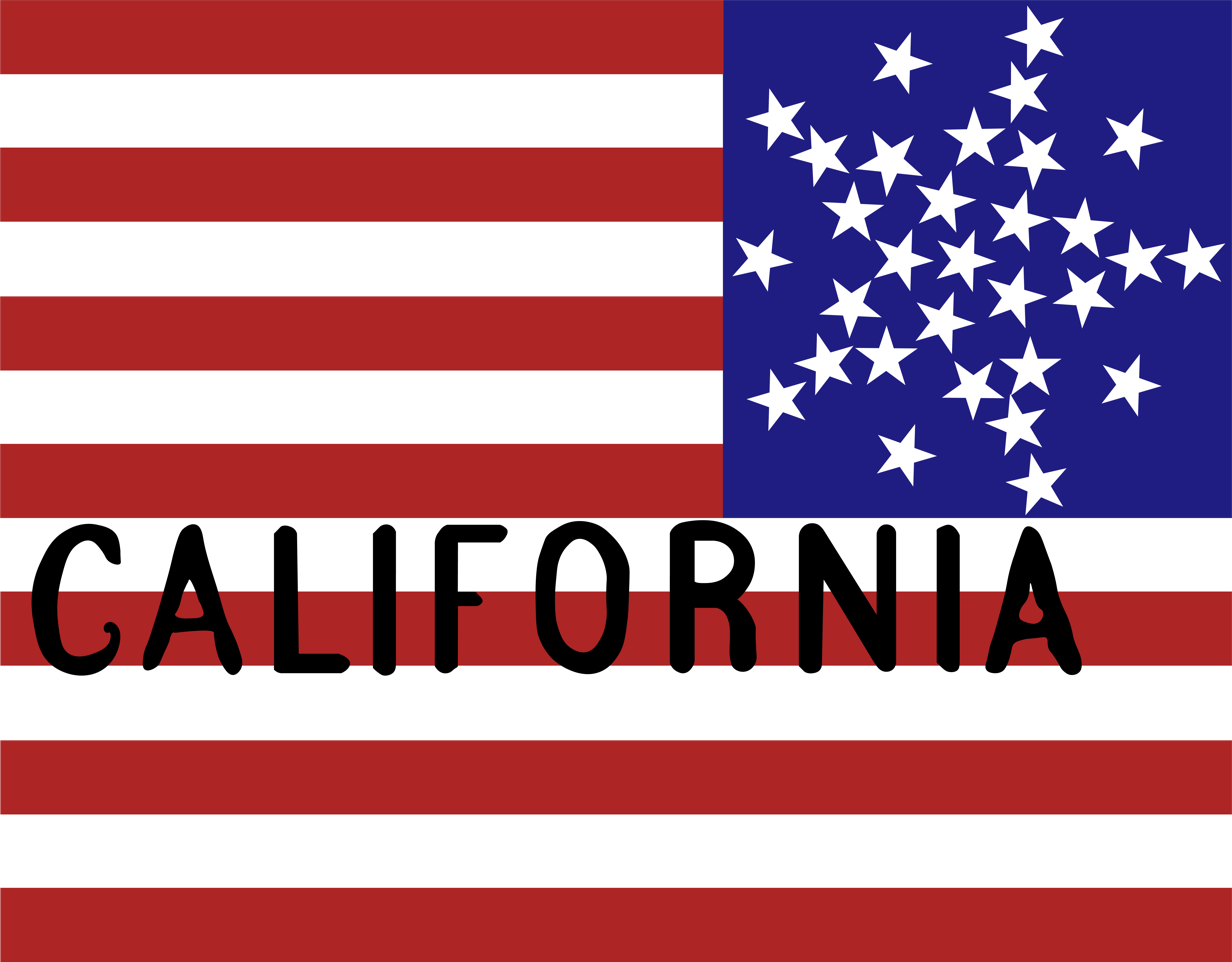
Flag used by California's delegates at the 1860 Republican National Convention

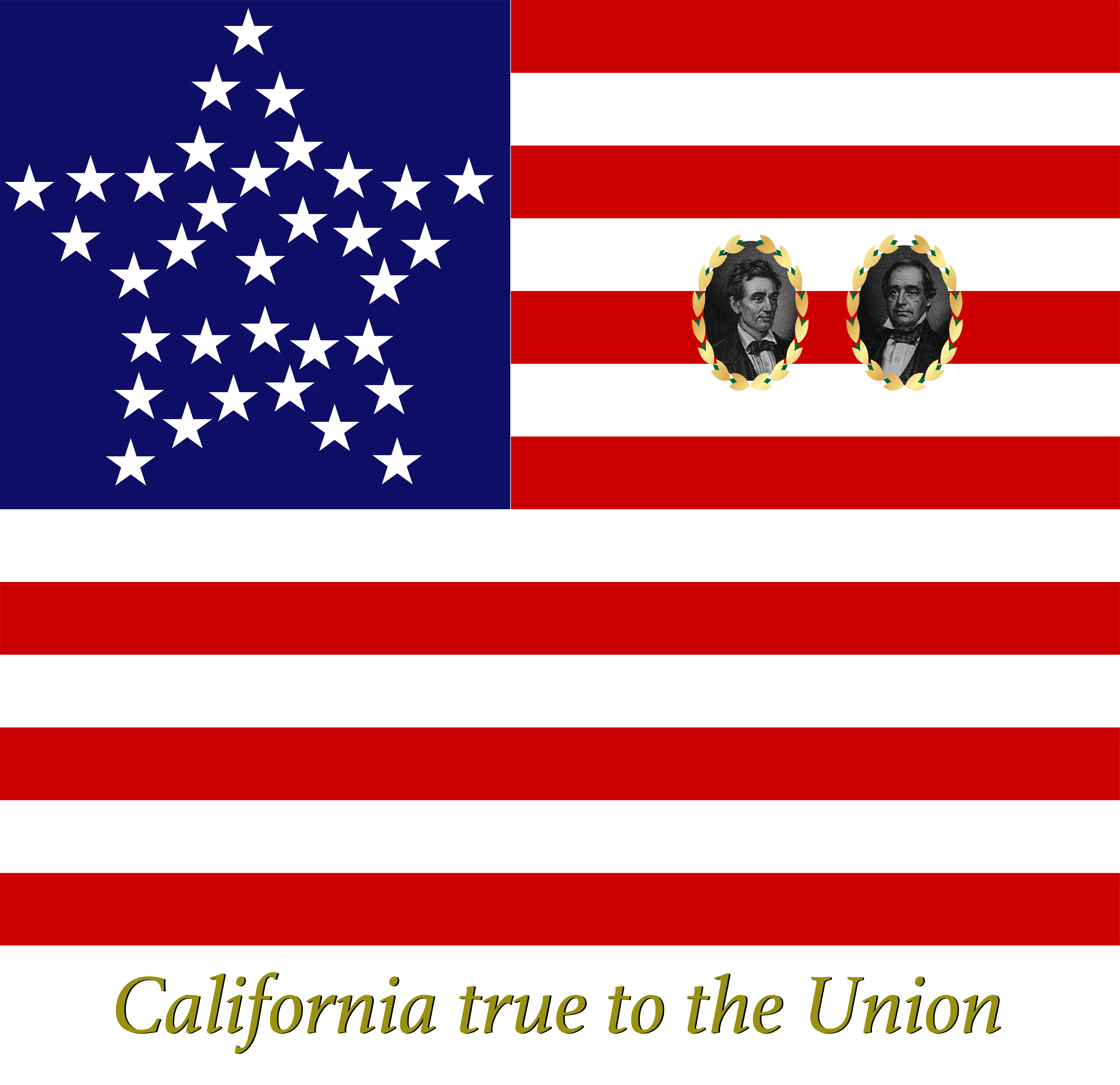
Digital reconstruction of the flag carried by California delegates during Lincoln’s inauguration, 1861 (based on description)

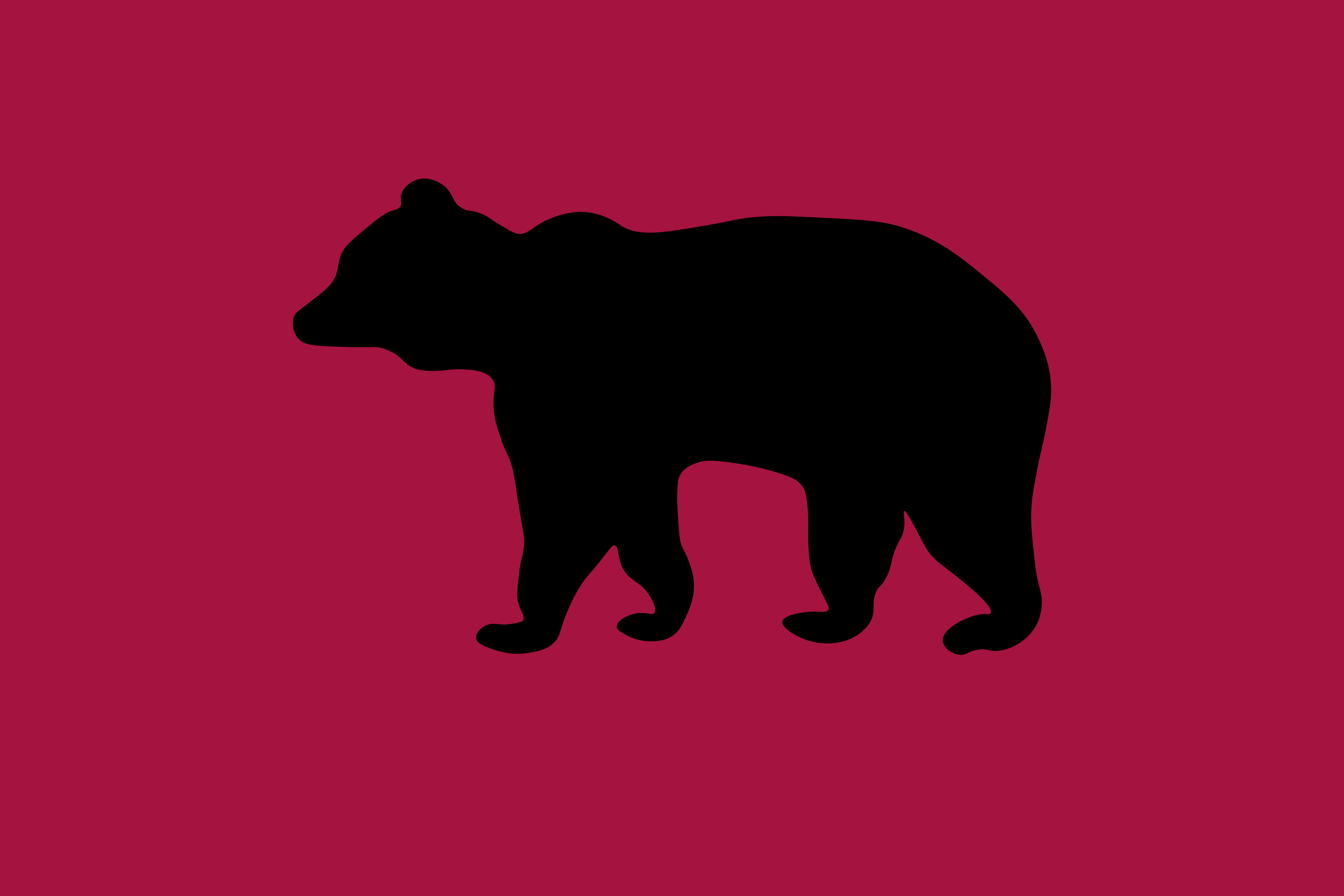
Digital reconstruction of bear flag flown by secessionists in Los Angeles, 1861 (based on description)

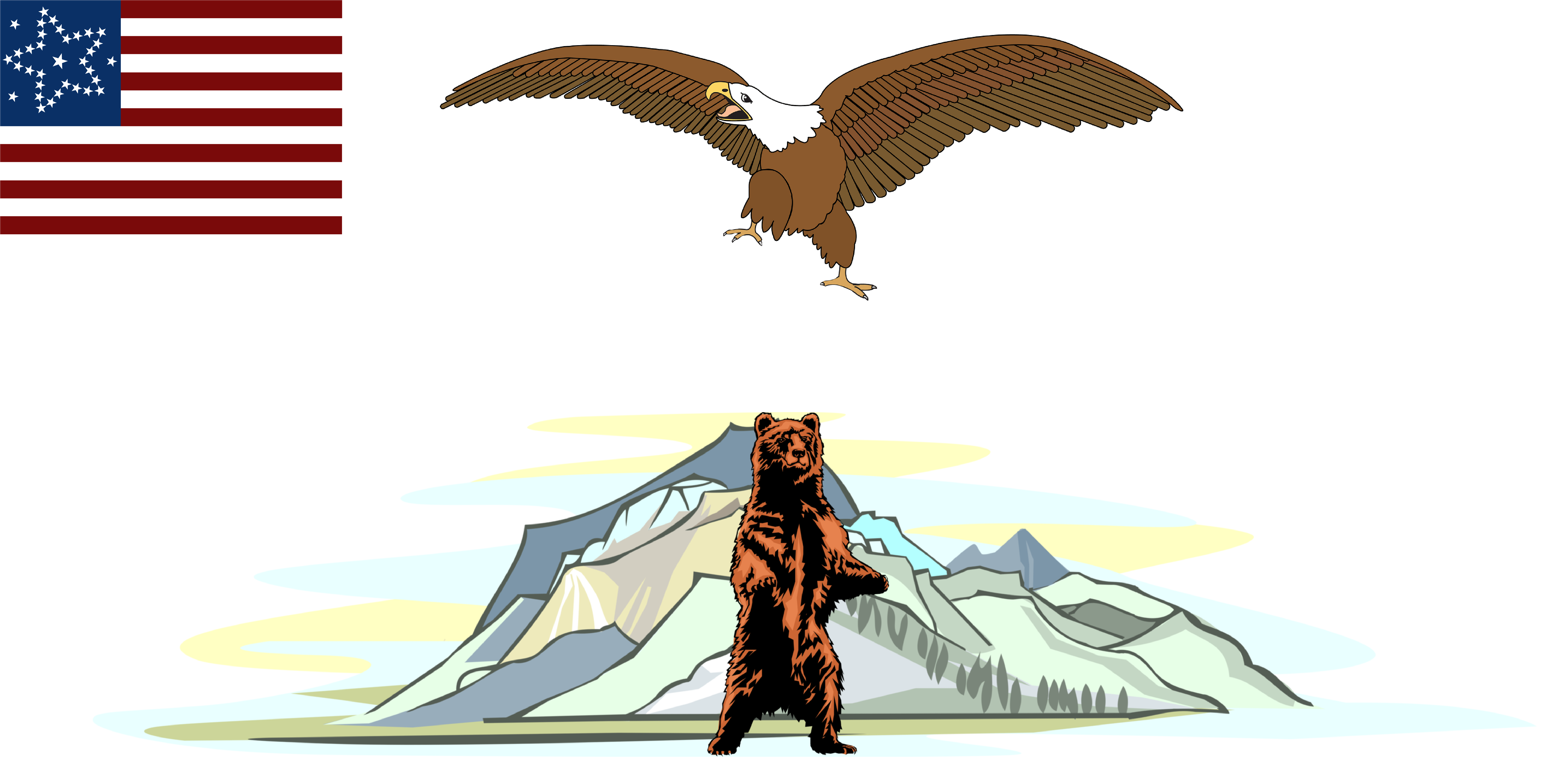
Digital reconstruction of the pro-union bear flag that flew in Stockton, 1861 (based on description)

Digital reconstruction of the 1861 state flag made for the San Francisco Board of Supervisors (based on description)

Digital reconstruction of 1862 state banner that hung in San Francisco (based on description)

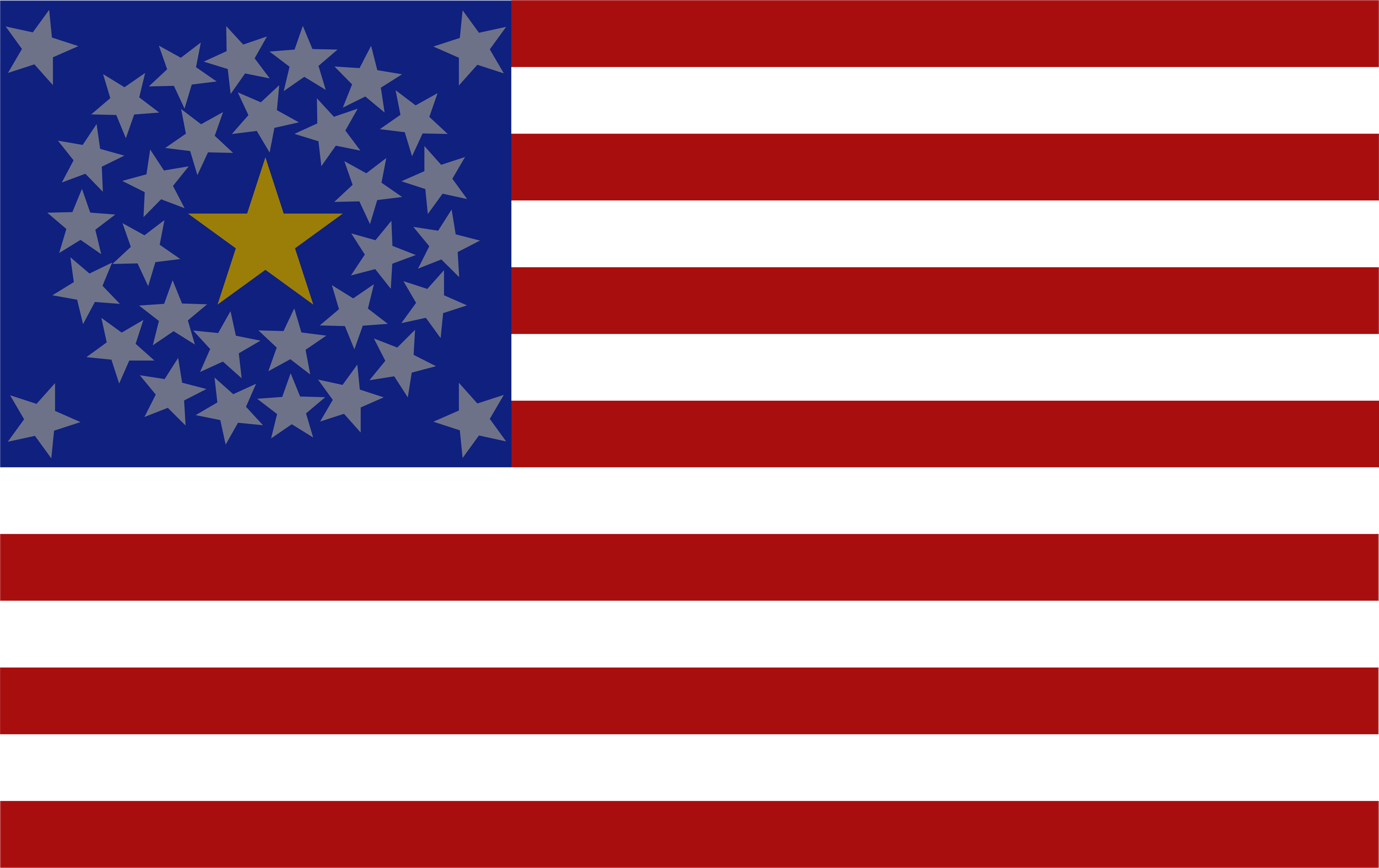
Digital reconstruction of and American flag with a unique star pattern. The gold star in the center stands for California, 1861 (based on description)

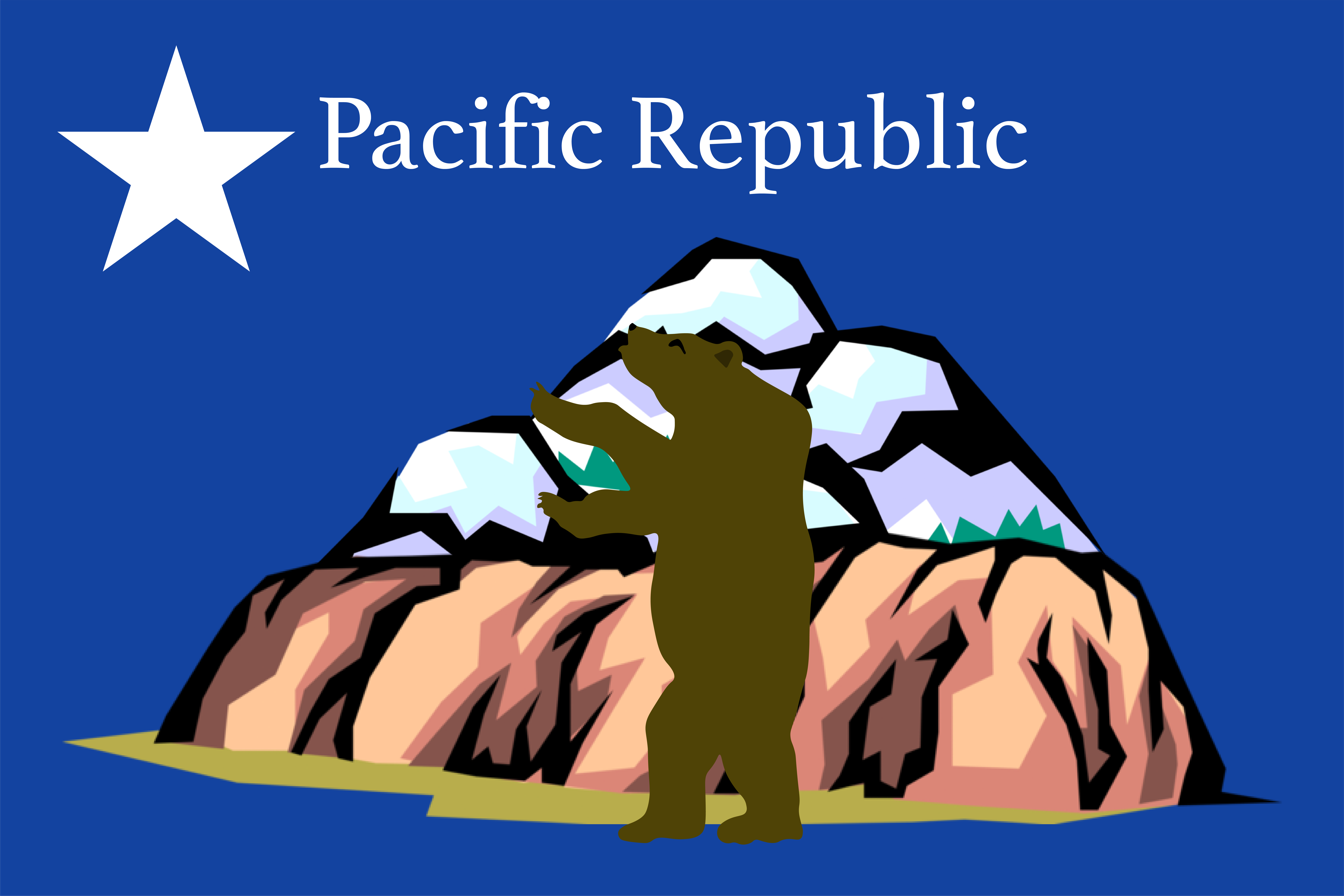
Digital reconstruction of the Pacific Republic flag, 1861 (based on description)

During the secession crisis and the early part of the American Civil War in 1861, California was divided between supporters of the union and supporters of southern secession. In the months leading up to the war, some opposed to the government in Los Angeles County and San Bernardino County showed support for secession by flying variants of the Bear Flag instead of the Stars and Stripes. One version of the Bear Flag that was flown on May 29 in Los Angeles was described as "...a deep red flag with a black bear painted on it." Duncan Beaumont raised a Pacific Republic flag from his boat in the Stockton to show his loyalty to secession. A party of men raised a banner containing a small American flag in the top corner and in the center a huge eagle with a grizzly bear below it. It was cut down by a different group of loyal unionists later in the day. The group thought it was a sign of disunion, but the day after they raised it in a different part of town to show their support for the Union. Soon secessionist across the state started raising other flags to express their sympathy for the Confederacy. These include: Palmetto flags, 7 stars flags, Stars and Bars, rattlesnake flags, and 15-24 star US flags. Not to be outdone, Unionists raised several flags to show support for the United States. The flags were the Stars and stripes (sometimes with patriotic mottos), Union club flags, Militia flags, German flags, and Irish flags.

During the war, Union soldiers routinely took action against secessionists who ran up Confederate flags in many places, including above the California statehouse in Sacramento, then disappeared before they could be caught. On July 4, 1861, during U.S. Independence Day celebrations in Sacramento, Democrat and veteran Maj. J. P. Gillis celebrated the independence of the United States from Great Britain and the secession of the Confederacy by unfurling a flag based on the first Confederate flag, the Stars and Bars, but containing seventeen stars rather than the Confederate banner's seven, and marching down the street to the cheers of pro-slavery individuals. Unionist Jack Biderman denounced Gillis, tore the flag from his hands, and taunted secessionists to try to take the flag back. No one tried. Because Gillis' flag was seized by Jack Biderman, it is referred to either as the "Biderman Flag" or the "Gillis Flag." The flag is preserved in the state capitol.

The state's regimental flags were outline by Adjutant General William Chauncey Kibbe in special order, No. 2:

The first or national color for Infantry shall be the same as that described for the garrison flag of the United States Army, with this exception: the name and number of the regiment shall be embroidered with silver on the centre strips.

The second regimental color for Infantry shall be the same as those for the Infantry in the United States Army, except that the arms of the United States shall be on one side and the arms of the state of California on the ether, with the number and description of the Regiment on a scroll beneath.

The regimental Standard for Cavalry shall be the same at that for Cavalry of the United States Army, with the exceptions noted in the descriptions of the color for Infantry.

The silk or the Guidons for Cavalry shall be of the fame colors and be cut to the same dimensions as those used in the Cavalry of the United States. On the red, the letter C. V. in white, with the number of the regiment in white above these letters; and on the white, the letter of the Company In red.

— Adjutant General William Chauncey Kibbe

Digital reconstruction of the state flag flown in the Bay area in 1864 from newspaper accounts

In June 1861, the San Francisco Board of Supervisors ordered three flags to be made by Norcross. One of them was based on the first state flag, with the "California Coat of arms" added to its field. It cost $50 ($1,840 adjusted for inflation) to make and was hung in the chamber of the board of supervisors with the other two flags. A year later a banner of similar design was hung in the city, but the seal was encircled by small American flags.

On July 14, 1864, a party under Gen. McDowell took a ship around the Bay Area to inspect the fortifications. The ship, called The Goliah, flew the flag of the United States and a state flag described as "...a body of red with a large circle in the centre, representing the great seal of the State."

=== 1870s–1890s ===
The flags and banners used to represent the state from the late 19th century either bore the state seal or a bear. The flags containing the state seal were mostly used by state officials, like delegates and the National Guard, while the Bear flag was popular with the public and fraternal organizations. With none of the flags ever being officially adopted, but there was a mention a state flag in a 1879 National guard law.

In February 1870, Joseph Neuman a pioneer of the American silk production, used his silk to make 2 unique American flags with 37 golden stars. The canton featured 36 smaller stars surrounding 1 larger star representing California. One was for the State Capitol and the other for the National Capitol. It took a couple of years for the flag to be sent to National Capitol. It was later displayed in the Smithsonian in 1888. They were describe as:

Digital reconstruction of the American flag made by Joseph Neuman for the state capitol

...The value, intrinsically, of these two Flags, manufactured thus with extra care, as emblems for our own State and for our National Capitol, is Five Thousand Dollars, and we, as a citizen of California, feel proud, with thousands of others, that California will thus have floating over the Dome of our National Congress such a proud emblem of California...

— California Farmer and Journal of Useful Sciences, 10 February 1870

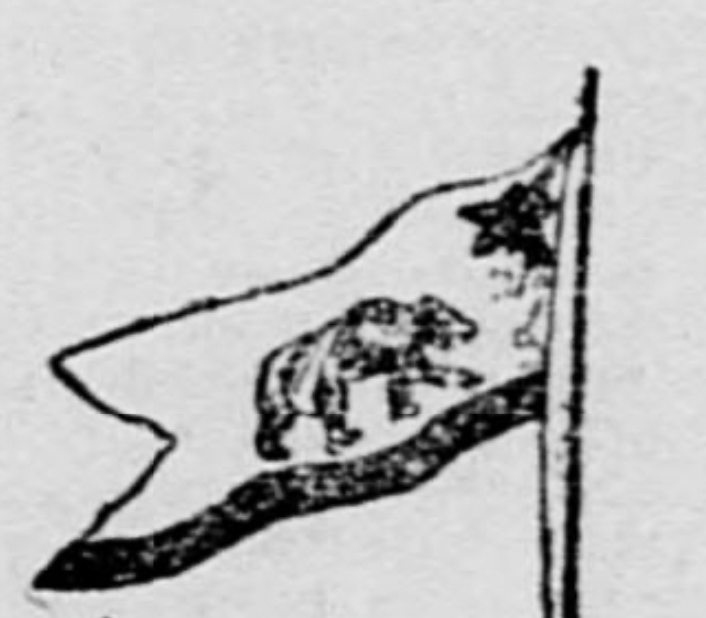
Swallowtail-Bear Flag flown in San Francisco, 1890

The Bear Flag flown throughout the 1870s was usually a brown bear on a plain white field with no star or stripe. The flag was used by the Native Sons of the Golden West and other pioneer organizations. Sometimes it was given as a trophy for boat races or used as a commodore flag. In 1885 the Bear Flag was first officially used to represent state during the Southern Exposition, it had the state's name in the center. Another Bear Flag was produced for the 1889 Paris Exposition and was later displayed in World WCTU Convention in 1891. It again flew during the 1893 World's Columbian Exposition. California's National Guard carried regimental flags with the state seal on a field of blue or purple, from 1879 until 1907. During the 1888 Democratic National Convention delegates from California flew a state banner. It was described as "...large white banner of silk, fringed with gold. The seal of the State occupies the central space, while in each corner is a typical California scene..." In 1889, the Grand Army of the Republic held a huge reunion for Union Civil War veterans in Milwaukee, Wisconsin. During a parade Veterans from the state carried with them a red flag with a golden bear in the center.

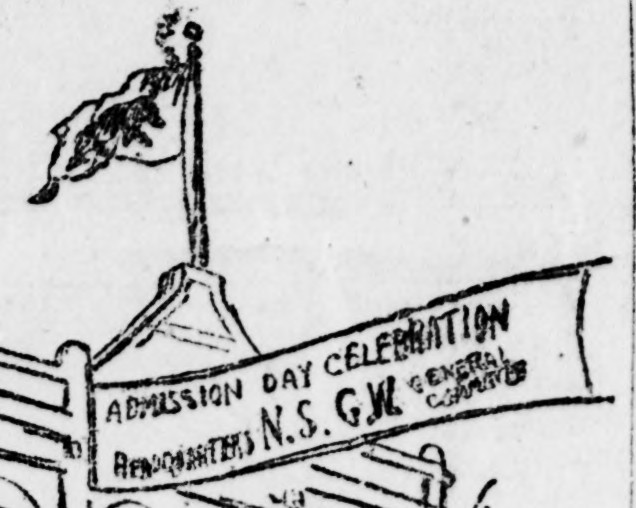
Etching of the Bear Flag flown in San Jose, 1894

In 1890 the Admission Day Celebration was being held in San Francisco, with 3 unique flags flown to represent the state. The designs were: "...Two vaqueros lassoing a grizzly bear, the peaks of Mount Shasta showing in the distance....Great seal of California...The north star, with grizzly bear In foreground..." Two years later a Bear Flag was hung in Los Angeles that was similar to the modern state flag. On June 14, 1896 Sonoma was celebrating 50th Anniversary of the Bear Flag Revolt. The town decided to raised a duplicate of the original Bear Flag, which is still in the Sonoma Barracks.

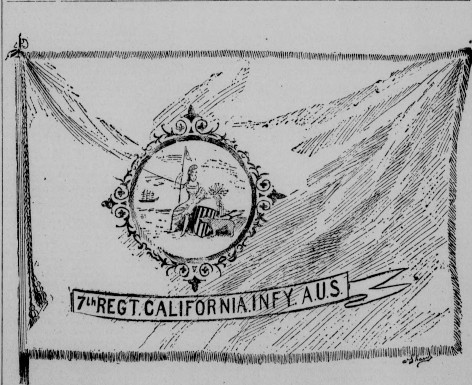
Flag carried during the Spanish-American War

When Spanish-American War started California troops carried two flags, one had a blue field with the state seal in the center and the name of the regiment below. The other was an American flag with name of the regiment in the stripes.

=== Hybrid flags ===
Between the years 1888-1900, people in the state started making hybrid flags combing the Stars and Stripes with the California grizzly bear. The flag was first used by the Pacific coast delegation when they went to the 1888 Republican National Convention. It was an American flag with a golden bear in the center. The design was also popular with European marksmen like Philo Jacoby. In 1890, he went on a trip to Germany and need a flag to show pride in the country and state he came from. Philo was given an American flag bearing 13 stars in a circle with a golden bear in the center, above the bear was the word "California." In 1900, Ruhstaller took his family on a five-month tour of Europe and carried with him the Sacramento marksmen club flag. It had 45 stars with a brown grizzly bear in the stripes and underneath the bear was the letters "S. H. R. C."

=== 1900-1911 ===
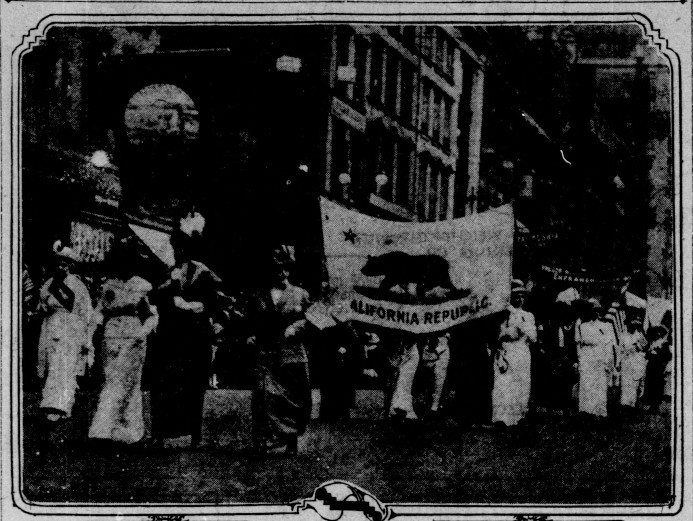
State flag on the right and a banner containing the state seal on the left, New York City 1912

In September of 1900, Santa Cruz was getting ready to hold the Republican State Convention. The whole town was patriotically decorated and in the center of the city's armory was a purple banner with the states coat of arms in the center. During the 1904 Republican National Convention, California delegates carried a banner bearing vertical stripes of purple, white and gold. On top was a white space with the inscription "CALIFORNIA." In the center was a representation of "...industrial California..." and a bear eating grapes. While the backside had a painting of the Sierra Nevada with a river cutting though it. In 1908, the State Republican Convention was being held in Oakland, during the introductory speeches a group of Suffragist in stormed in demanding the right to vote. They carried with them a large blue flag with the state seal embroidered in gold.

In 1909 the USS California was given two flags, one was a Bear Flag and other had the state seal on it. Three years later the last state flag to contain the state seal was carried in a women suffrage parade in New York City.

The Grizzly Bear, January 1912

The state flag was first officially adopted by the state legislature on February 3, 1911. Nine day later Senator J. B. Holohan of Watsonville proposed a different design. It had a plain white field with a red star in the corner and a bear on a plain of grass no text or stripe. Holohan's design was never adopted by the senate. Although the state flag was adopted the design of the bear and color of the text were not outlined in the original bill. This caused state flags made between years 1911-1853 to have varied designs, based on the manufacturer. It wasn't until 1953 when new bill change the bear to Donald Greame Kelley's design.

=== Variants ===
In October of 1911, President Willian Howard Taff was giving a speech in Golden Gate Park in San Francisco about the Panama-Pacific International Exposition. On the stage was the President's stand decorated with flags. Above the stand was large flag containing a golden field with a bear in the middle of it.

In 1933, the city of Santa Rosa held a parade celebrating the 83rd anniversary of California being admitted to the union. During the party unique Bear Flag was flown, it had plain red field with a golden bear in the center.

== In popular culture ==
The flag of California serves as a basis for the flag of the fictional New California Republic in the popular post-apocalyptic Fallout video-gaming franchise.

Flag of the New California Republic

== Gallery ==
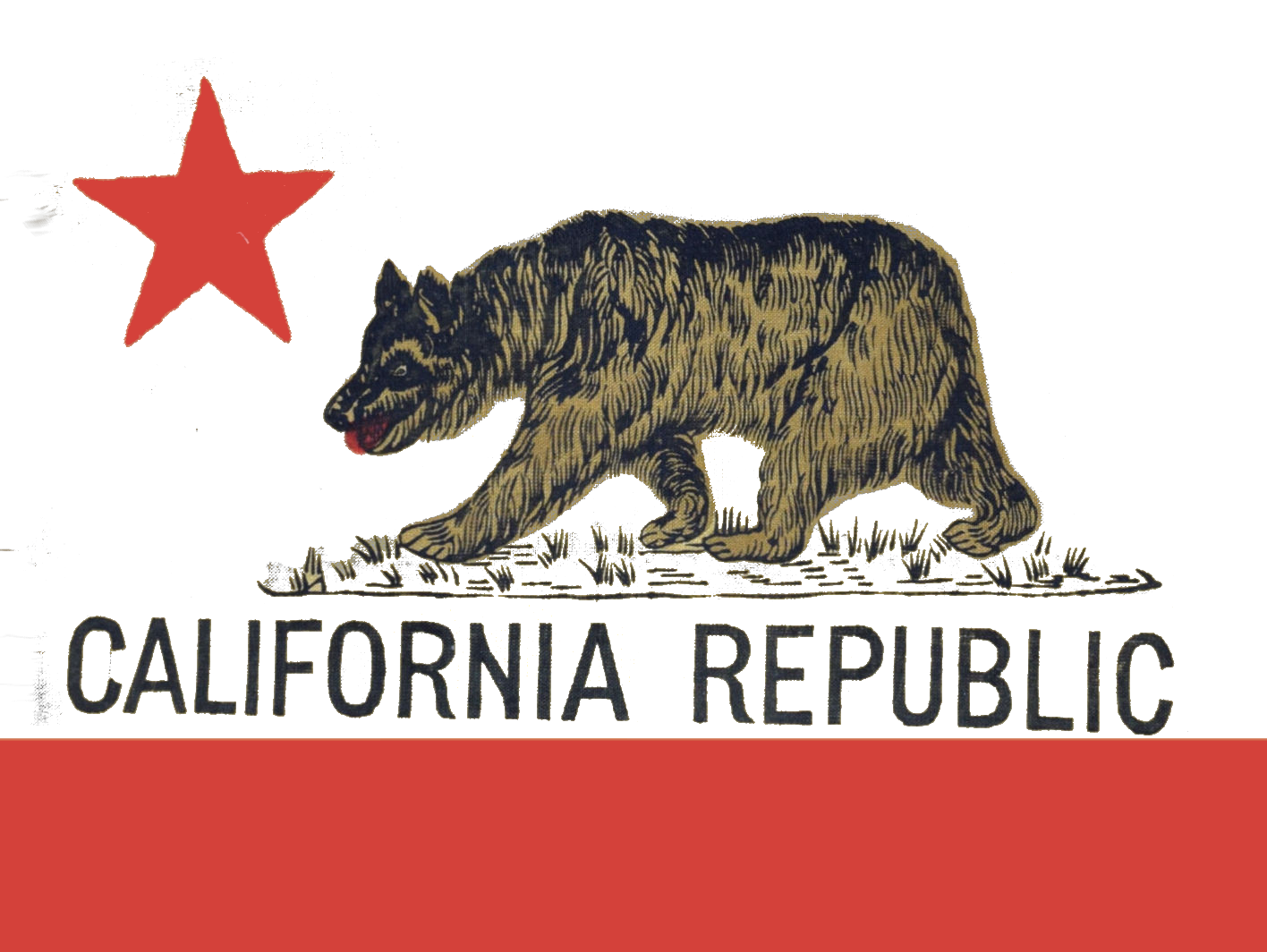
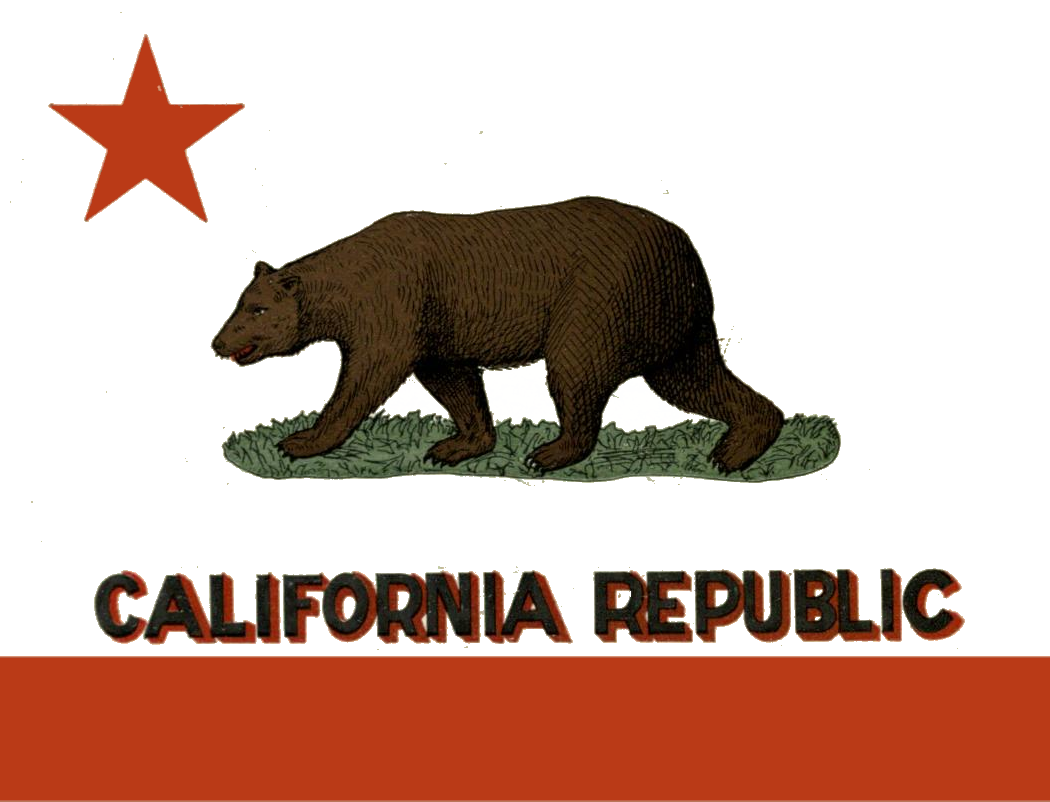
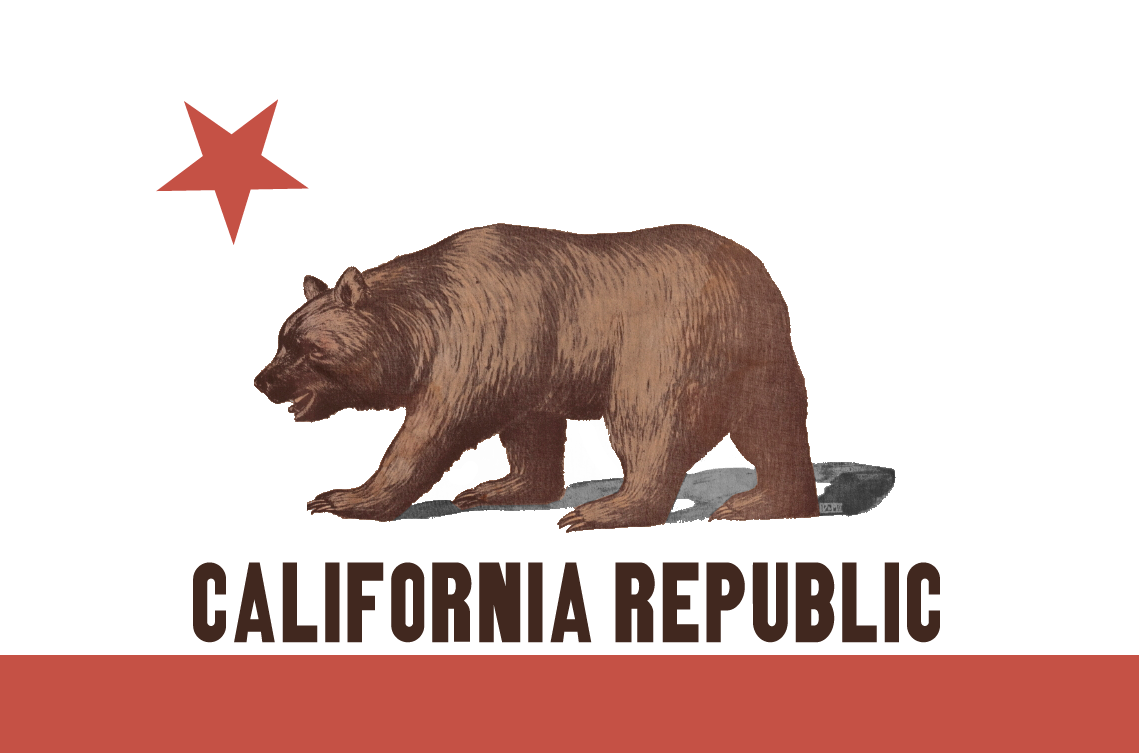
Some examples of Californian state flags from the early 20th century (before the design was officially standardized in 1953) display multiple if minor degrees of variation

Digital reproduction of the first Bear Flag

Digital reproduction of Todd's Bear Flag

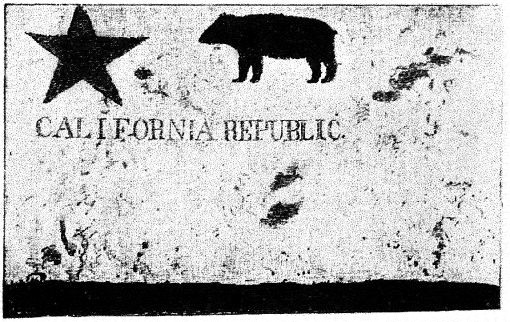
Todd's original Bear Flag, fabricated and flown at the Sonoma revolt, photographed in 1890

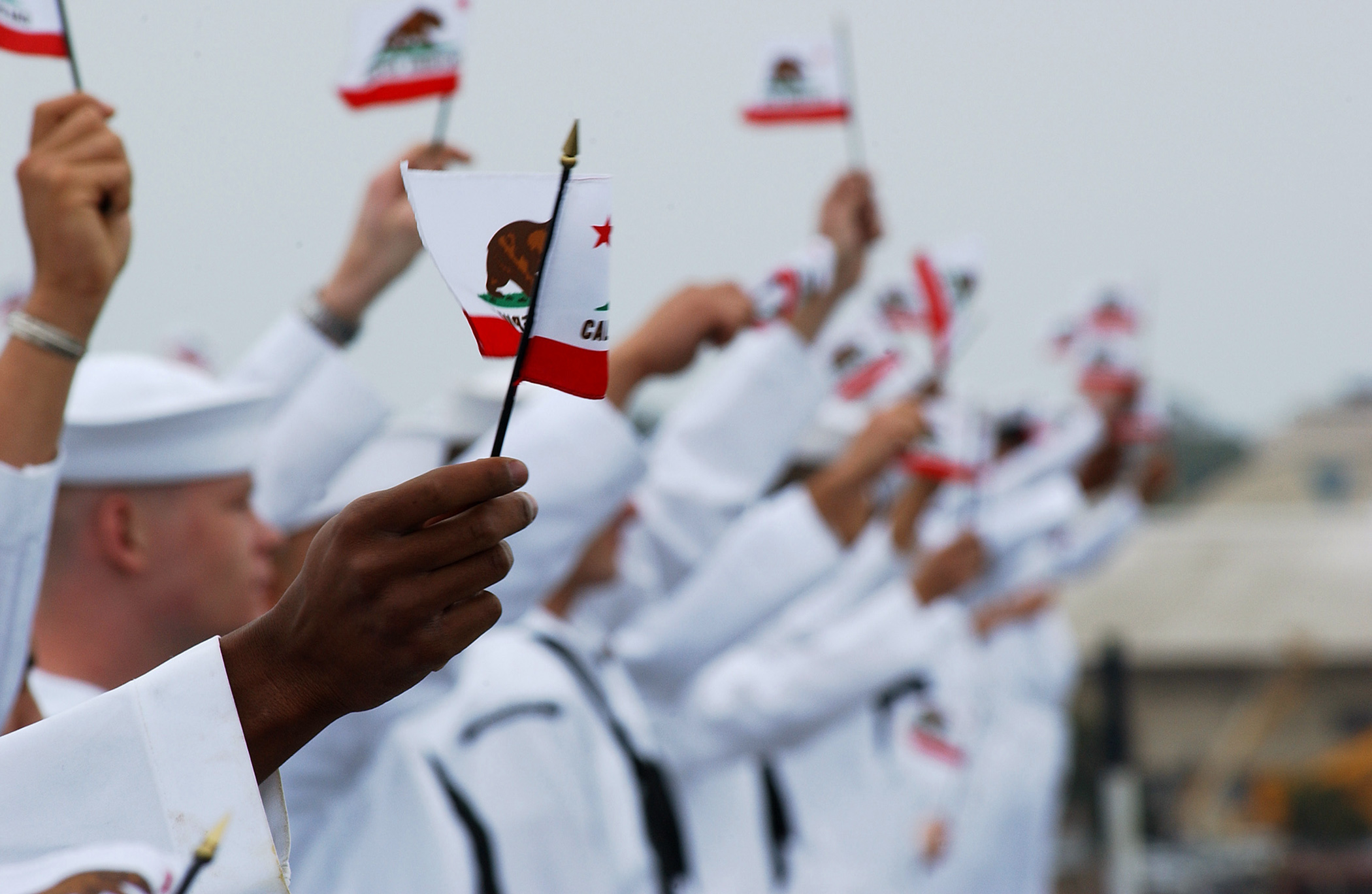
Sailors waving the flag in San Diego

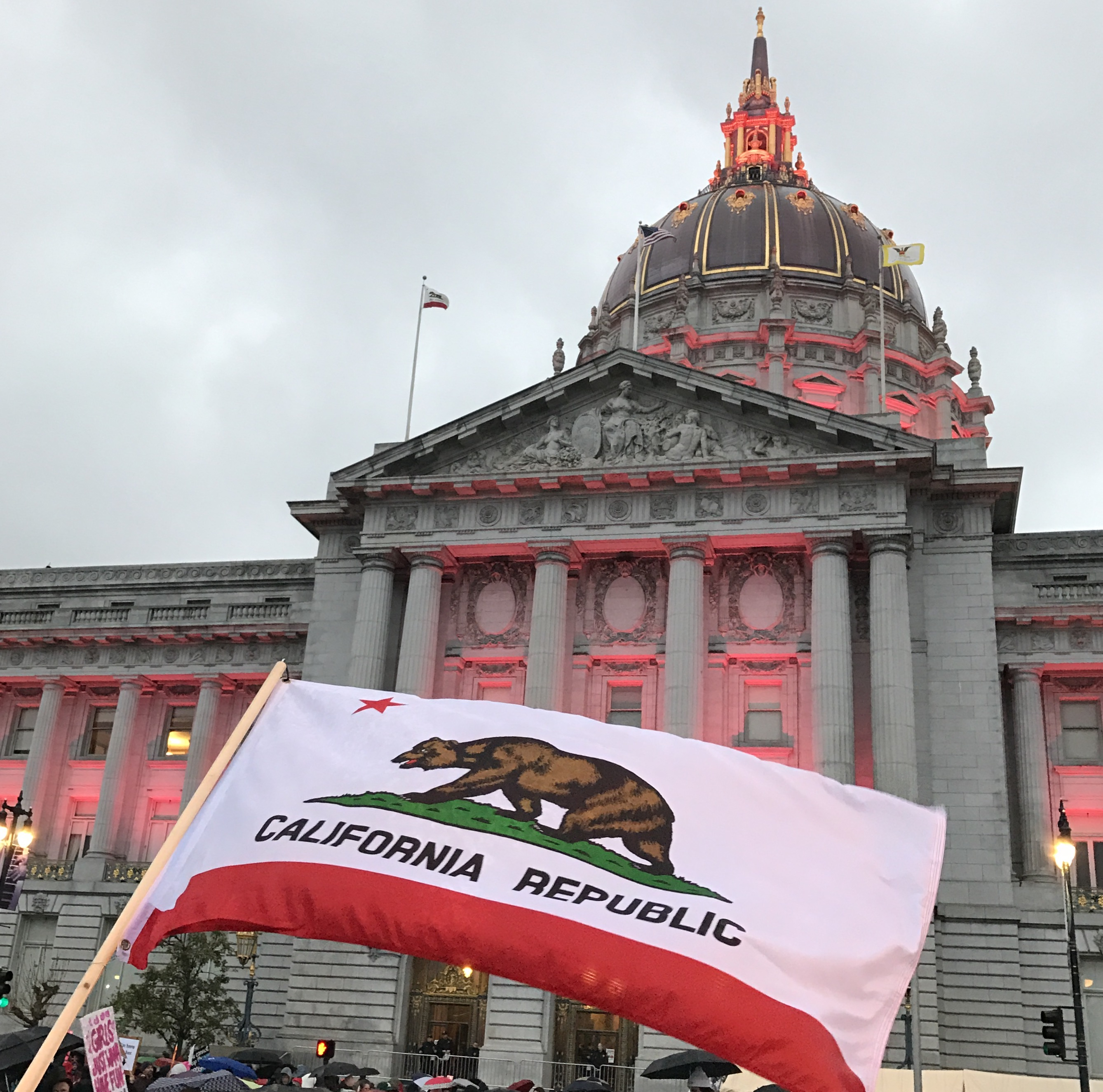
The flag flying in front of San Francisco City Hall

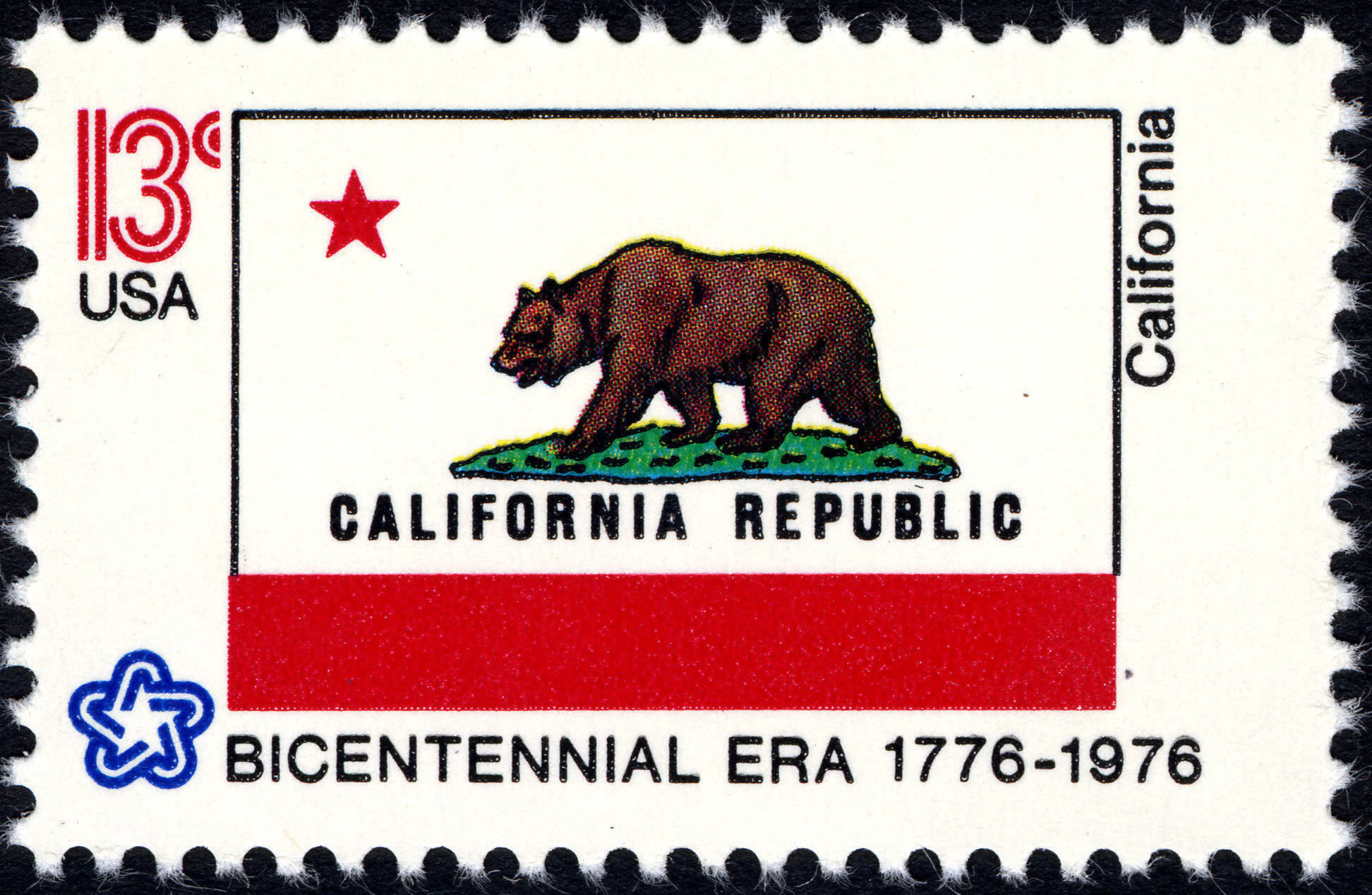
The California state flag as depicted in the 1976 bicentennial postage stamp series

== See also ==
- List of California state symbols
- List of flags by design
- List of U.S. state, district, and territorial insignia
