= Monroeville, California =

Monroeville
- Former settlement
- Location in California Monroeville (the United States)
- Coordinates: 39°40′40″N 121°58′39″W
- Country: United States
- State: California
- County: Glenn
- Elevation: 128 ft (39 m)

Monroeville (also, Munroeville), named for its founder U. P. Monroe, was a town located near the Sacramento River in Glenn County, California, United States. It was located 15 miles (24 km) north of Butte City, near the mouth of Stony Creek, at an elevation of 128 feet (39 m).

From 1851 until 1853, Monroeville was the county seat of Colusi County. The people of the community of Colusa fought for and eventually won the right to become the County Seat in 1853. 62 residents were recorded to have lived in the community as of 1852; records after 1853 are non-existent. Monroeville disappeared from maps by 1874, and the only remaining trace of the town is a cemetery.

Settler William B. Ide, leader of the Bear Flag Revolt of 1846, died in Monroeville in 1852. A post office operated at Monroeville from 1853 to 1862. The area containing Monroeville was eventually absorbed into Glenn County when that county was formed in 1891.
