= Pico family of California =

Prominent Californio family of Southern California

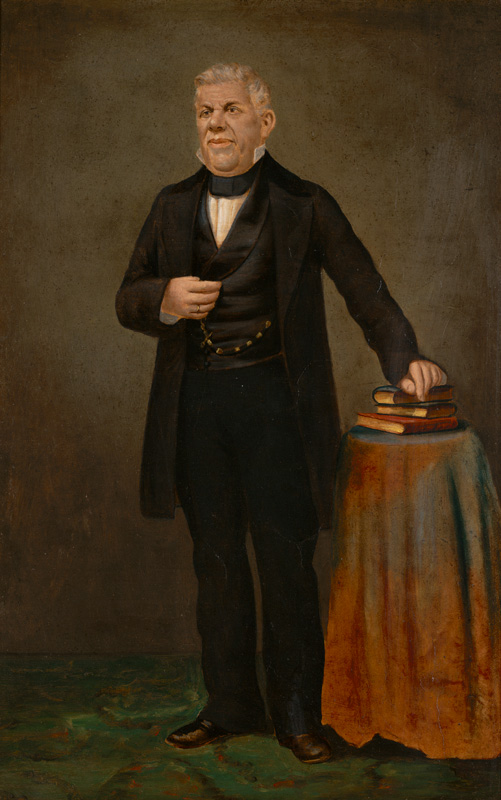
Pío Pico, the last Governor of Alta California prior to the Conquest of California.

The Pico family is a prominent Californio family of Southern California. Members of the family held extensive rancho grants and numerous important positions, including Governor of Alta California, signer of the Constitution of California, and California State Senator, among numerous others. Numerous locations are named after the family across California.

== Notable members ==
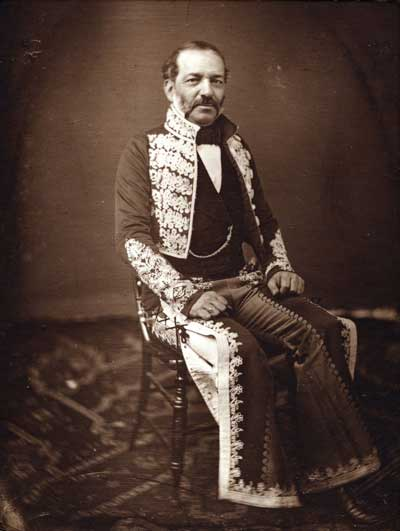
Andrés Pico, a California Senator and California State Assemblyman.

=== Pío Pico III ===
Pío de Jesús Pico III was born in Spain, and became the first member of the family believed to reside in the Americas. He likely came to what was then New Spain in the first or second decade of the 18th century. (Note: Pío Pico III's date of immigration to colonial Mexico came from a 1986 pamphlet for the Pio Pico State Historic Park by Howard Holter. However, Holter's source for this is unknown.)

=== Santiago Pico ===
The family was founded by Santiago Pico, who came to California in 1775 as a member of the de Anza expedition. He was born in 1733 in Sonora. He served at the Presidio of San Francisco until he was appointed to the Presidio of San Diego in 1777. He married María Jacinta Bastida and had seven children, from which members of the Pico family all descend. He was granted Rancho Simi in 1795. He died 1815 in San Buenaventura.

=== José María Pico ===
José María Pico was born in 1764, as son of Santiago Pico. He was one of the first settlers of San Diego. In 1782, he became a soldier, joining the company at the Presidio of San Diego. He later served as corporal and then sergeant of the guard at Mission San Luis Rey de Francia, until his retirement in 1818. In 1789, he married María Estaquia López. He died in San Gabriel in 1819.

=== Pío Pico ===
Pío de Jesús Pico IV was born in 1801 in San Gabriel, and died in Los Angeles in 1894. He served as the last Governor of Alta California prior to the Conquest of California. He was one of the wealthiest men in California during his lifetime, acquiring numerous important ranchos, including Rancho Paso de Bartolo, Rancho Santa Margarita y Las Flores, and Rancho Jamul, among numerous others. He also served as a member of the Los Angeles Common Council.

=== Andrés Pico ===
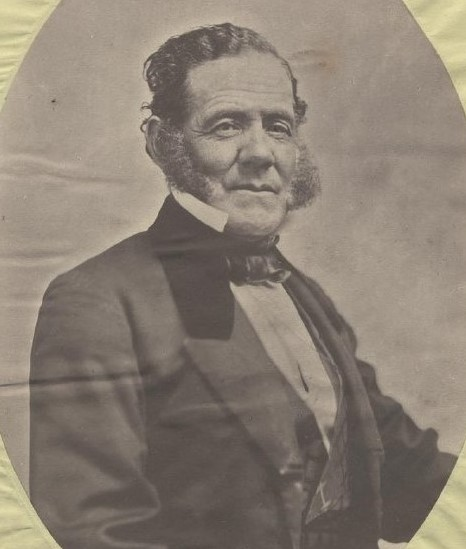
Antonio María Pico, Mayor of San Jose and a signer of the Constitution of California.

Andrés Pico was born in 1810 in San Diego. He served as a member of the California Senate (1860 to 1876) and the California State Assembly (1851 to 1860). During the Conquest of California, he led Californio forces in the Battle of San Pasqual in 1846. He was one of the two principal signers of the Treaty of Cahuenga in 1847, which ended the Mexican–American War in California. He was the owner of Rancho Ex-Mission San Fernando. He was also commissioned as Brigadier General of the California National Guard.

=== Antonio María Pico ===
Antonio María Pico was born in 1808 in Monterey. He was elected as a delegate for Santa Clara County to the Monterey Constitutional Convention of 1849 and was a signer of the Californian Constitution. He also served as Alcalde of San José (mayor) in 1835.

=== Salomón Pico ===
Salomón Pico was born in 1821 in Salinas. He participated in the California Gold Rush, but his property rights to land where gold was discovered were disregarded by American squatters. Salomon subsequently vowed revenge against the eastern settlers coming to California and became a notorious outlaw. He was hailed as a hero and vigilante by Californios and decried as a bandit by government authorities. He is considered to be one of the inspirations for El Zorro, the fictional Californio hero. The Solomon Hills in Santa Barbara County are named after him.

=== Aaron Pico ===
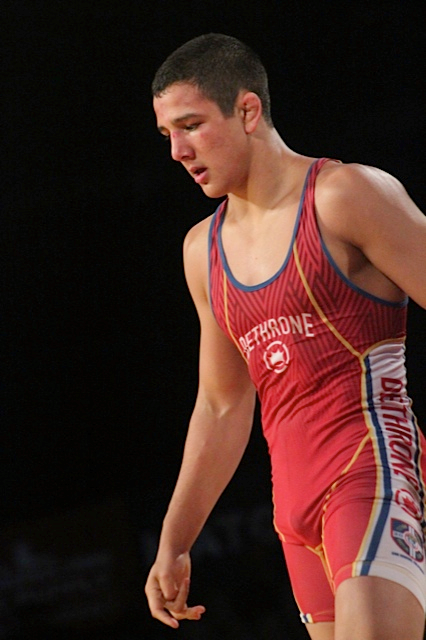
Aaron Pico, a champion mixed martial artist and professional wrestler.

Aaron Pico was born in 1996 in Whittier. He is the great-great-great-great-grandson of Pío Pico. He is a mixed martial artist and former freestyle wrestler, currently signed to UFC. As a wrestler, he was a Cadet World Champion and placed second at the 2016 US Olympic Team Trials. Pico made his professional MMA debut at Bellator NYC on June 24, 2017, at Madison Square Garden.

=== Other members ===
- José de Jesús Pico, a ranchero and soldier who served as Administrator of Mission San Miguel Arcángel
- Rómulo Pico, a prominent ranchero in the San Fernando Valley and builder of the Rómulo Pico Adobe, a National Historic Landmark
- José Antonio Pico, a noted ranchero who once owned Rancho Ex-Mission San Luis Rey de Francia

== Legacy ==
Numerous locations in California are named after members of the Pico family, including:

- City of Pico Rivera
- Pico Boulevard in Los Angeles
- Pio Pico State Historic Park in Whittier
- Pico-Union neighborhood in Los Angeles
- Pico-Robertson neighborhood in Los Angeles
- Pico/Rimpau neighborhood in Los Angeles
- Pío Pico Elementary School in Santa Ana
- Pío Pico Elementary School in Pico Rivera
- Pío Pico Elementary School in Los Angeles

== See also ==
- List of Californios people
- Media related to Pico family of California at Wikimedia Commons
