= Rómulo Pico Adobe =

Historic house in California, United States

- U.S. National Register of Historic Places
- California Historical Landmark No. 362
- Los Angeles Historic-Cultural Monument
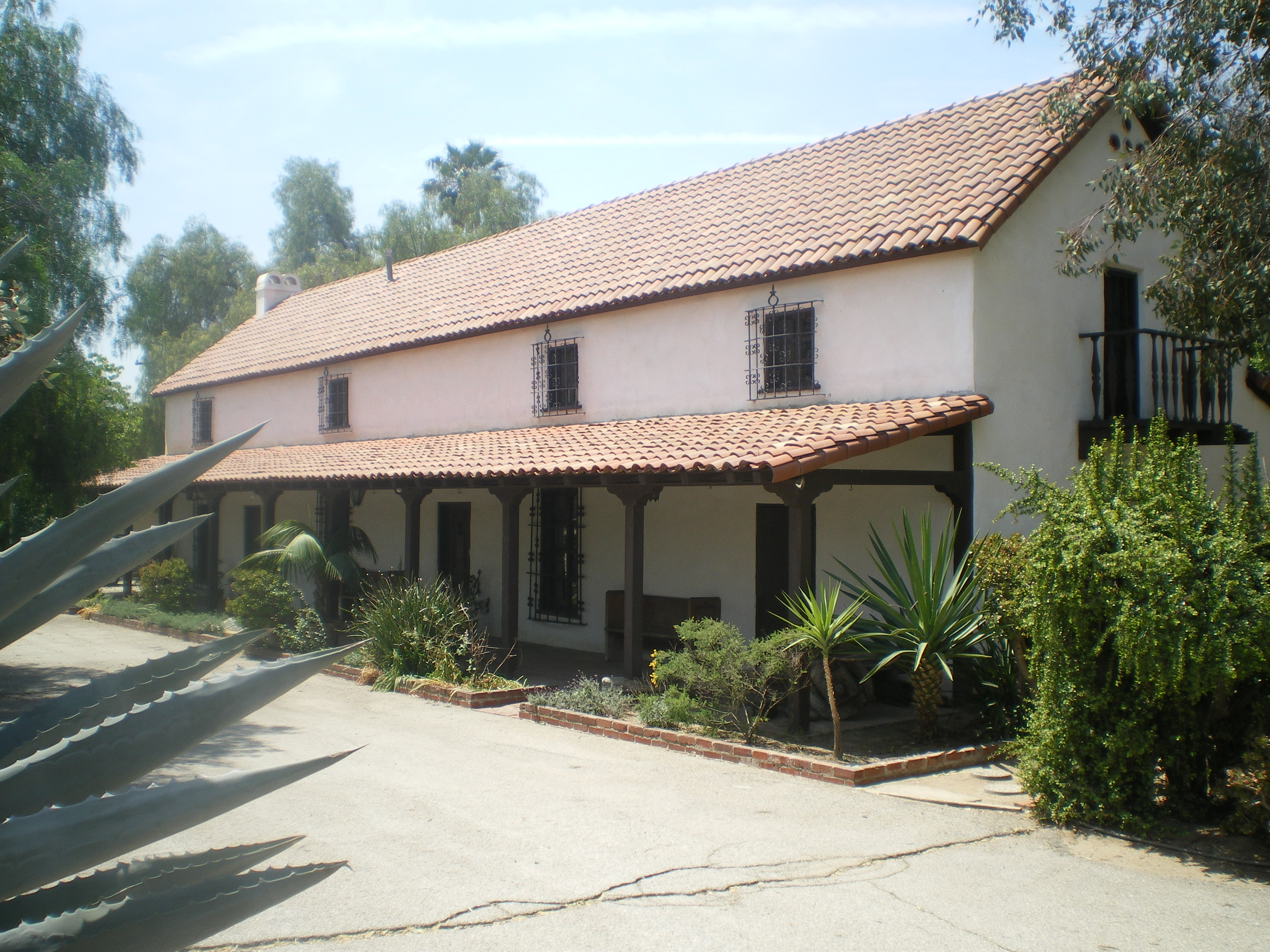
- Rómulo Pico Adobe, 2008

- Location within the Los Angeles metropolitan area Location within California Location within the United States
- Location: 10940 Sepulveda Boulevard, Mission Hills, Los Angeles, California
- Coordinates: 34°16′8″N 118°28′3″W
- Built: 1834
- NRHP reference No.: 66000211
- CHISL No.: 362
- LAHCM No.: 7

Significant dates
- Added to NRHP: 13 November 1966
- Designated LAHCM: September 21, 1962

Rómulo Pico Adobe, also known as Ranchito Rómulo and Andrés Pico Adobe, was built in 1834 and is the oldest residence in the San Fernando Valley, making it the second oldest residence in Los Angeles. Built and owned by the Pico family of California, a prominent Californio family, the adobe is located in the Mission Hills section of the city and is a short distance from the San Fernando Mission (Mission San Fernando Rey de España). It was listed on the National Register of Historic Places in 1966.

== Early history ==
Located on Sepulveda Boulevard in Mission Hills, the original part of the Romulo Pico Adobe was built in 1834 by Tongva-Fernandeño, Tataviam-Fernandeño, and Chumash-Ventuaño Native Americans (Indians) from the San Fernando Mission. The original purpose of the structure is unknown, though the adobe was located in the center of the Mission's orchards and surrounding vineyards.

Before 1846, the original adobe consisted of what is now the living room. In 1845, Juan Manso and Andrés Pico had been granted a nine-year lease by the latter's brother Governor Pío Pico for the Mission San Fernando Rey de España lands. In 1846 the Pío Pico government sold Eulogio de Celis the secularized Mission lands, nearly the entire San Fernando Valley, as the Rancho Ex-Mission San Fernando, which included the Pico Adobe. The dining room and library were added during the time of de Celis' ownership.

De Celis vacated the property in 1853 and sold Andrés Pico an undivided half interest in the Rancho, which included the southern half of the Valley, the San Fernando Mission compound, and the adobe. It is unknown if the adobe was used for any purpose for the next 20 years. In debt, Andrés Pico sold his southern half-interest in the Rancho ex-Mission San Fernando to his brother Pío Pico in 1862. In 1873, Rómulo Pico and his father Andres Pico found the house, on the northern half of the divided Rancho, to be in a dilapidated state as a result of abandonment. Rómulo is credited for restoring the adobe and adding a kitchen and two side wings. He also placed wooden flooring over the original tile floor. A second story was added in approximately 1873. Rómulo lived there with his wife Catarina Pico and family.

Pio Pico sold his southern half of the San Fernando Valley to Isaac Lankershim in 1869. In 1874, the heirs of Eulogio de Celis sold their northern half of Rancho Ex-Mission San Fernando lands to northern Californians: California State Senator Charles Maclay and his partners George K. Porter, a San Francisco shoe manufacturer, and his brother Benjamin F. Porter. The sale did not include the Mission ruins and immediate surroundings.

Rómulo and Catarina Pico continued to live at "Ranchito Rómulo" ('Rómulo's Little Ranch') for many years before moving to Los Angeles. They kept the adobe until the late 1890s, using it for overnight stays during return visits to the valley. In the following years they rented or sold the adobe several times, and it was eventually abandoned. The vacant structure deteriorated and was subjected to vandalism during the first two decades of the 20th century. Thieves and scavengers picked apart the adobe. Some invaders dug up the floors and knocked down walls in search of fabled buried gold and 'treasure.'

== Deterioration and restoration ==
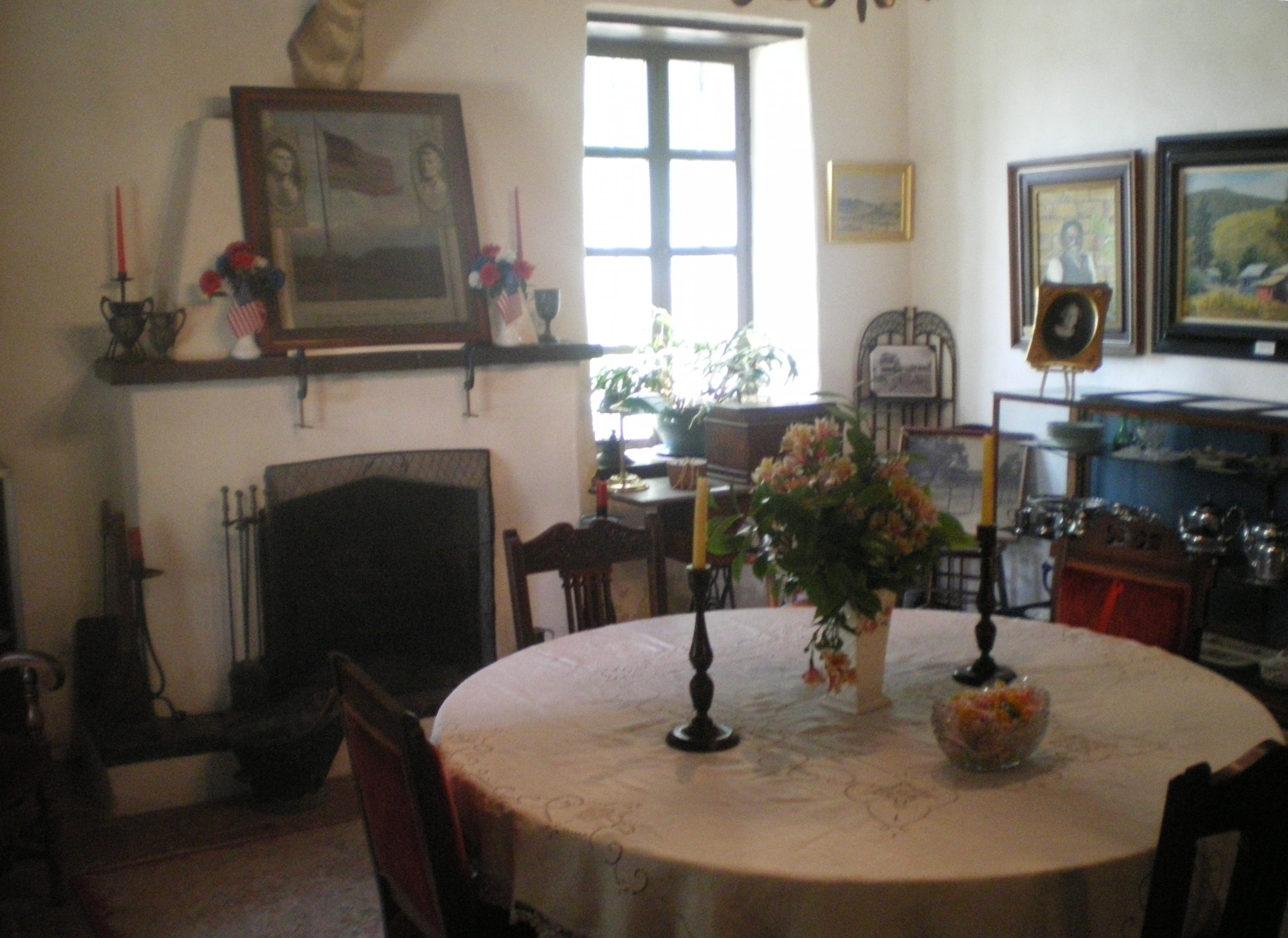
Dining room at Rómulo Pico Adobe with original fireplace

In 1930, Mark Raymond Harrington, curator of the Southwest Museum, purchased the abandoned property from the heirs of the Lopez family. He restored the adobe after acquiring it. He later wrote:

When I took over the Romulo Pico house about 1930 the walls were still standing, but the roof, stairway, doors, windows, and many of the window and door frames were missing; also most of the cross beams and most of the floor. I did not 'rebuild' the walls, but I did replace three or four layers of adobe blocks around the top of the walls, the originals having been damaged by the weather. I put in new timbers, new floors, and a new staircase. I regard the main building as having been built in the Mission period - probably early 1830s, the wings possibly added by the Picos. ... The only changes I made were to build an addition to the north wing of the house; put a fireplace in the living room (only the dining room had one originally), rebuild the patio walls and build a garage.

== Current use as a living museum ==
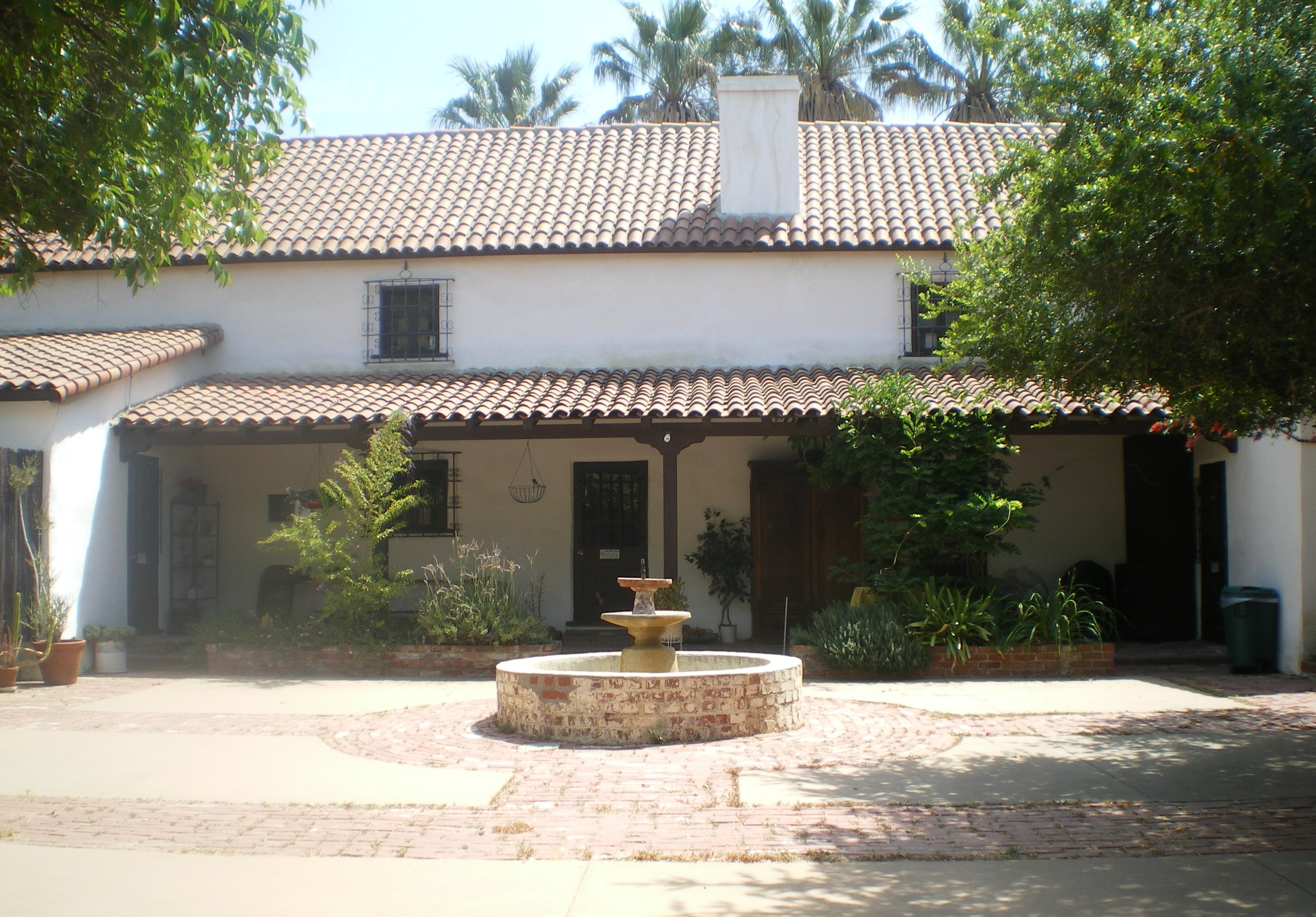
The Pico Adobe's courtyard

In 1965, the City of Los Angeles purchased the property. The adobe was damaged in 1971 during the Sylmar earthquake. The city removed the chimney, and a section of the office wall which separated had to be repaired. The exterior and grounds are administered by the city Department of Recreation and Parks.

The adobe itself is managed by the San Fernando Valley Historical Society. It restored the interior and operates a "living museum" at the adobe. The adobe is also used for the Historical Society's monthly meetings, weddings, receptions, breakfasts, dinners, and picnics. Two special affairs are "Rancho Days", depicting early California living, held on the third Sunday of September; and Las Posadas, the enactment of the Mexican Christmas procession on the Saturday before Christmas.

Also in the city park is the Lankershim Reading Room, a small octagonal building that is the only remaining structure of the Lankershim Ranch. The ranch territory once took in a large part of the southern San Fernando Valley. The reading room was moved to the park in 2001, and was restored to a working condition in 2009–2010.

== Designation as historic site ==
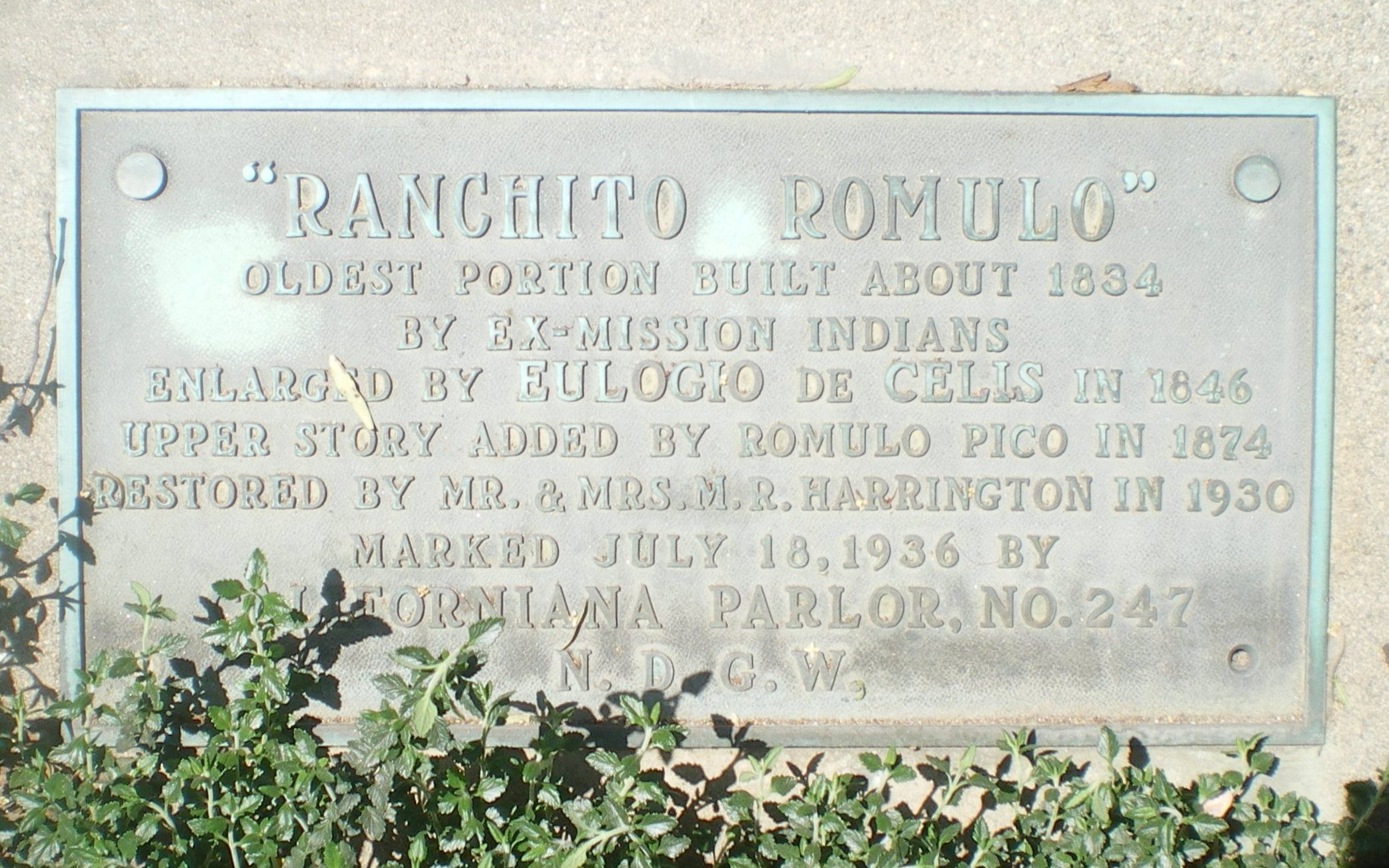
Historical marker at the Pico Adobe, placed by the Native Daughters of the Golden West in 1936.

The Pico Adobe has been listed as a historic building at the city, state, and national level as follows:

- In 1939, the adobe was registered as California Historical Landmark #362.
- In 1962, the City of Los Angeles included the Pico Adobe and the Leonis Adobe in its first group of Cultural-Historic Monuments. As of 2007, there were over 850 such monuments, and the Pico Adobe is designated as Los Angeles Historic-Cultural Monument #7.
- In 1966, the adobe was listed on the National Register of Historic Places.
- In 2010, the Lankershim Reading Room was also designated a Los Angeles Historic-Cultural Monument.

== See also ==
- List of Registered Historic Places in Los Angeles
- List of Los Angeles Historic-Cultural Monuments in the San Fernando Valley
- History of the San Fernando Valley to 1915
- Louis R. Nowell (1915–2000), Los Angeles City Council member, 1963–77, led fight to save Adobe
