= José María Pico =

- Born: José Darío María Pico; 1764; San Xavier de Cavazan (Sonora, New Spain)
- Died: 1819 (aged 54–55); San Gabriel, Alta California, New Spain
- Occupation: military

José Darío María Pico (1764 – 1819) was member of the Pico family of California, an important Californio family to Southern California. He was a soldier in the Company of San Diego since 1782, corporal at Mission San Luis Rey (1798) and sergeant (1805–1818).

== Biography ==
José María Pico was born in 1764 in San Xavier Cavazos, Sonora, New Spain. His mother, María Jacinta de la Bastida, was of mixed European and African descent. His father, Santiago Pico, was Mestizo (Europe and Native Mexican descent) and a member of the prominent Pico family of California. His brothers were José Dolores, José María, José Miguel, Francisco Javier, Patricio, and his sisters María Antonia Tomasa and Josefa María. His family moved to California when he was a child.

=== Military career ===
He served as a soldier and in 1782 joined the company at the Presidio of San Diego. Later, in 1798, he became a corporal of guard at Mission San Luis Rey. Between 1805 and 1818 he reached the position of sergeant, also in San Luis Rey, retiring in 1818. José María Pico died in 1819, in San Gabriel, California.

== Personal life ==
In 1789, he married María Estaquia López (o Gutiérrez), originally from Sonora. His three sons were Andrés, José Antonio Bernardo and Pío. He also had six daughters: Concepción, Estefanía, Jacinta, Ysadora, Tomasa, and Feliciana. José María, was the father of Pio Pico, who was the last Mexican governor of California.

=== Descendants ===
- Andrés (1810 – 1876), the most prominent son of José María was in command of the Californians at the Battle of San Pascual and fought in battles in the San Gabriel y La Mesa. On January 13, 1847, occupying the office of national forces in California, signed the capitulation of Cahuenga, ending the war. In 1851, he was a member of the assembly. The following year, he was presidential elector. Later, in 1858, was receiver general of the militia brigade. Between 1860 and 1861 was a senator of the state. He and the other sons of Santiago Pico de la Cruz received significant lands: Agua Caliente, Arroyo Seco, Bolsa de San Cayetano, Piedra Blanca, El Pescadero, Jurmala, La Habra, Los Flores, Moquelamo, El Paso de Bartolo Viejo, Punto del Año Nuevo, San José del Gracia de Simi, Santa Margarita, Temecula, Valle de San José y Loma de Casos. He never married, but adopted several children.
- Pío Pico (1801 – 1894) had an important role in the Californian history, twice as acting Governor of Alta California (now the State of California) under Mexican rule. He was, in fact, the last Mexican Governor of this state. He married María Ignacia Alvarado.
