= Rancho Jamul =

Mexican land grant in California

Coordinates: 32.670°N 116.830°W

Rancho Jamul was a 8,926-acre (36.12 km^{2}) Mexican land grant in present-day San Diego County, California, given in 1829 by Mexican governor José María de Echeandía to Pío Pico. In 1831, Governor Manuel Victoria reconfirmed the grant to Pío Pico. The grant extended from present day Jamul southeast to Dulzura. It is currently the 5,600-acre Rancho Jamul Ecological Reserve, operated by the California Department of Fish and Wildlife.

== History ==
Pío Pico was given a provisional grant of one square league Governor Victoria in 1831. His brother, Andrés Pico, ran the rancho from 1836 to 1838. In 1837 the rancho was attacked by Indians, and the rancho abandoned.

In 1851, Pico's brother-in-law, John Forster, claiming to be acting as Pico's agent, sold Rancho Jamul to Bonifacio Lopez, Philip Crosthwaite (Lopez son-in-law), Richard Rust, and William E. Rust. However, it does not appear that anything was ever done in performance of the contract by anyone. But this was the cause latter of extensive litigation concerning ownership of Rancho Jamul.

With the cession of California to the United States following the Mexican-American War, the 1848 Treaty of Guadalupe Hidalgo provided that the land grants would be honored. As required by the Land Act of 1851, a claim for two square leagues by Pío Pico for Rancho Jamul was filed with the Public Land Commission in 1852, but was rejected in 1855 on the grounds of insufficient documentation of the grant. Pico claimed his papers were lost in an Indian attack on the Rancho.

While stationed in San Diego, Captain Henry Stanton Burton (–1869) of the First Regiment of New York Volunteers and his new wife, María Amparo Ruiz (1833 –1895), occupied Rancho Jamul in 1854. According to an affidavit made by María Burton and filed in the United States district court in 1880, Burton purchased the interests of Lopez and Crosthwaite in 1853; and the interests of Richard and William E. Rust in 1854.

In 1867, nearly twelve years after the claim had been rejected, an appearance was entered in the United States district court on behalf of General Burton. In 1870, María Burton arranged for Pío Pico to declare that he had sold all his interest to Burton. In 1875, Nellie Burton, a daughter of Henry Stanton Burton and María Burton, married Miguél de Pedrorena (1844–1882). In 1876, the grant for Rancho Jamul was patented to the heirs of Henry S. Burton (María A. Burton, and her son, Henry H. Burton and daughter, Nellie Burton Pedrorena).

The rancho was used as collateral for mortgages, and numerous claims were filed against the estate and the litigation continued for years. The estate of Henry S. Burton was not settled until 1891. The title changed hands repeatedly.

María Burton and her son, Henry Burton, founded the Jamul Portland Cement Manufacturing Company in 1889 but went bankrupt in 1892.

In 1915, John D. Spreckels sold to Rancho Jamul to Louis J. Wilde.

The ranch was later owned by San Diego's Daley family. Between 1998 and 2001, the ranch was purchased by the California Department of Fish and Wildlife. What remains of the rancho is currently Rancho Jamul Ecological Reserve

== See also ==
- Category:East County, San Diego
- Category:Ranchos of San Diego County, California
