= Andrés Pico =

American politician (1810-1876)

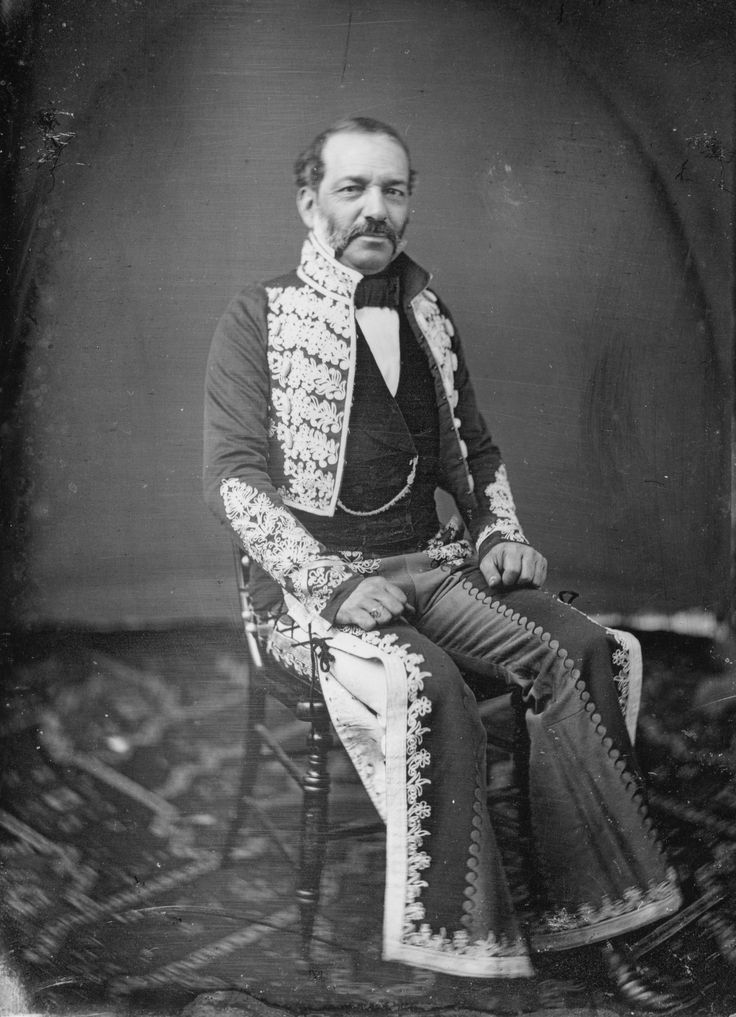
- Pico c. 1850

Governor of California
- Acting; January 10, 1847 – January 13, 1847
- Preceded by: José María Flores
- Succeeded by: Robert F. Stockton (as Military Governor of California)

Member of the California Senate from the 1st district
- In office January 2, 1860 – January 6, 1862
- Preceded by: Cameron E. Thom
- Succeeded by: Jacob C. Bogart

Member of the California State Assembly
- In office January 4, 1858 – January 2, 1860
- Preceded by: Multi-member district
- Succeeded by: Multi-member district
- Constituency: 1st district
- In office January 6, 1851 – January 3, 1853
- Preceded by: Multi-member district
- Succeeded by: Multi-member district
- Constituency: 2nd district

Personal details
- Born: November 18, 1810 San Diego, Alta California, New Spain
- Died: February 14, 1876 (aged 65) Los Angeles, California, U.S.
- Citizenship: United States
- Party: Whig (before 1853); Democratic (after 1853)
- Other political affiliations: Chivalry Democratic (1850s); Breckenridge Democratic (1860s)
- Spouse: Catalina Carmen Moreno
- Children: Rómulo; Catarina
- Relatives: José María Pico (father); Pío Pico (brother); José de la Guerra y Noriega (brother-in-law); José Antonio Carrillo (brother-in-law); Pico family
- Profession: Rancher, soldier, politician
- Awards: Rancho Ex-Mission San Fernando; Pico Canyon Oilfield named for him Rancho Pico Junior High School named after him

Military service
- Allegiance: Mexico; Alta California; United States
- Branch/service: Mexican cavalry California cavalry
- Rank: General (Mexico); Brigadier General (California militia)
- Commands: California Lancers
- Battles/wars: Mexican–American War; Battle of San Pascual

Andrés Pico (November 18, 1810 – February 14, 1876) was a Californio who became a successful rancher, fought in the contested Battle of San Pascual during the Mexican–American War, and negotiated promises of post-war protections for Californios in the 1847 Treaty of Cahuenga. After California became one of the United States, Pico was elected to the state assembly and senate. He championed the Pico Act of 1859, seeking to split California into two parts in the interest of fair tax representation of the Californios in the southern third of the state. He was appointed as the commanding brigadier general of the state militia during the American Civil War.

== Early life ==
Andrés Pico was born in San Diego in 1810 as a member of the Pico family of California, a prominent Californio family. He was one of several sons of José María Pico and María Eustaquia López. An older brother was Pío Pico, who twice served as governor of Alta California.

== Ranchero ==
In 1845, under the law for secularization of former Church properties, his older brother Governor Pío Pico granted Andrés Pico and his associate Juan Manso a nine-year lease for the Mission San Fernando Rey de España lands, which encompassed nearly the entire San Fernando Valley. At that time a 35-year-old rancher, Andrés Pico lived in Pueblo de Los Ángeles. He ran cattle on the ranch and used the mission complex as his hacienda. He gave Rómulo Pico Adobe to his son.

In 1846, to raise funds for the Mexican–American War, the Pío Pico government sold secularized mission lands. The Mission San Fernando was sold to Eulogio de Celis, who established Rancho Ex-Mission San Fernando. Celis returned to Spain, but his descendants stayed in California. Under the terms of secularization, the sale excluded the Mission compound and its immediate surroundings, which were reserved for Don Andrés.

== In the Mexican–American War ==
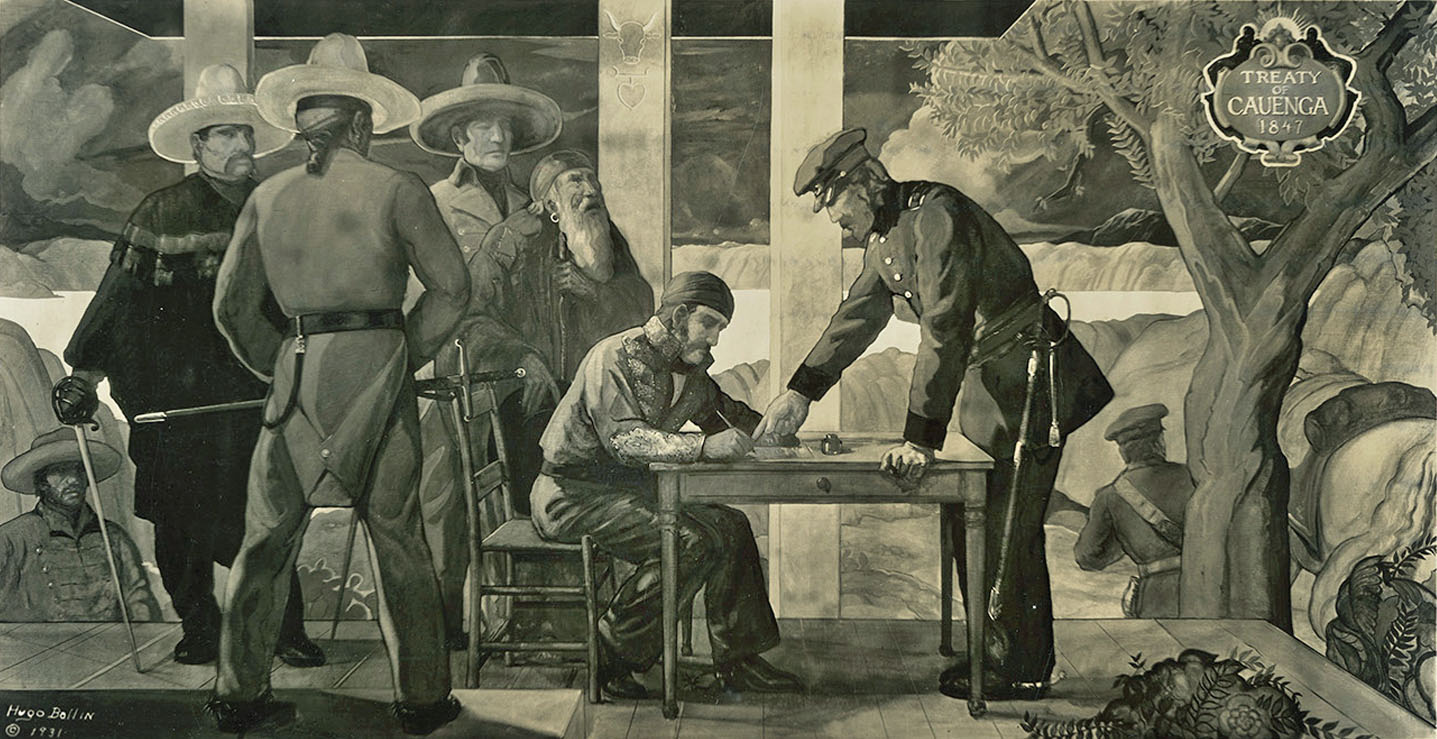
Signing of the treaty at Campo de Cahuenga by Andrés Pico and John C. Frémont

During the Mexican–American War, Andrés Pico commanded the native forces, the California Lancers, in Alta California. In 1846, Pico led an attack on forces commanded by U.S. Army general Stephen Watts Kearny at the fierce but inconclusive Battle of San Pasqual. He is sometimes confused with his older brother Pío Pico, who in 1847, was elected as the last governor of Alta California.

On January 13, 1847, as the acting governor of Mexican Alta California (while his brother was in Mexico raising additional money for the fight against the United States), Andrés Pico approached the U.S. Army commander Lieutenant Colonel John C. Frémont, man to man and alone. Without firing a shot, Don Andrés and Frémont agreed to the terms of the Ceasefire of Cahuenga, an informal agreement that ended the war in California, in exchange for promises of protection of California from abuses by Frémont's forces. Frémont agreed to stop burning Californio ranches and stop stealing horses and cattle; he and Andrés Pico became friends. The Ceasefire was confirmed by the Treaty of San Fernando, formalized at the mission.

== Post-statehood activity ==
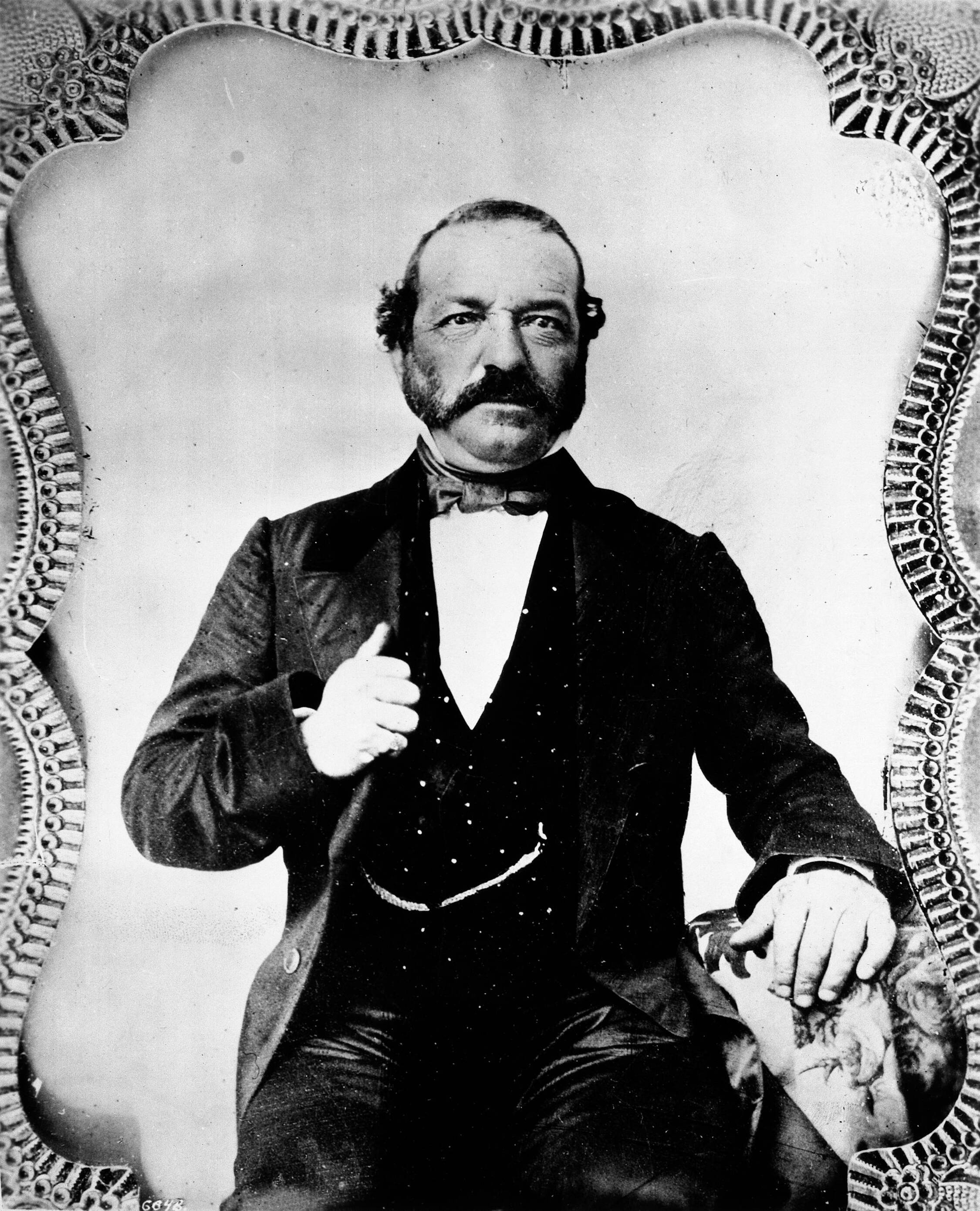
Pico in an undated photograph

Despite having previously fought against the Americans, Pico was elected a delegate to California's First Constitutional Convention in August 1849. In 1850, after statehood was achieved, Don Andrés was elected to the California State Assembly from Los Ángeles. Because of perceived anti-Californio sentiments in San Francisco, as well as his own pro-Southern sentiments, Pico introduced a bill in 1859 to divide California into two states (the lower counties becoming the Territory of Colorado). The bill passed the legislature, was signed by the governor, and was put to a vote of Southern California voters. The voters approved the split, but Congress failed to act on the matter.

In 1853, Don Andrés acquired a half interest in Rancho Ex-Mission San Fernando from Eulogio F. de Celis; it was split along present-day Roscoe Boulevard, with his brother Pio Pico's land being the southern half of the San Fernando Valley to the Santa Monica Mountains.

In 1858, Pico was commissioned as a brigadier general in the California Militia.

=== Pico Act of 1859 ===
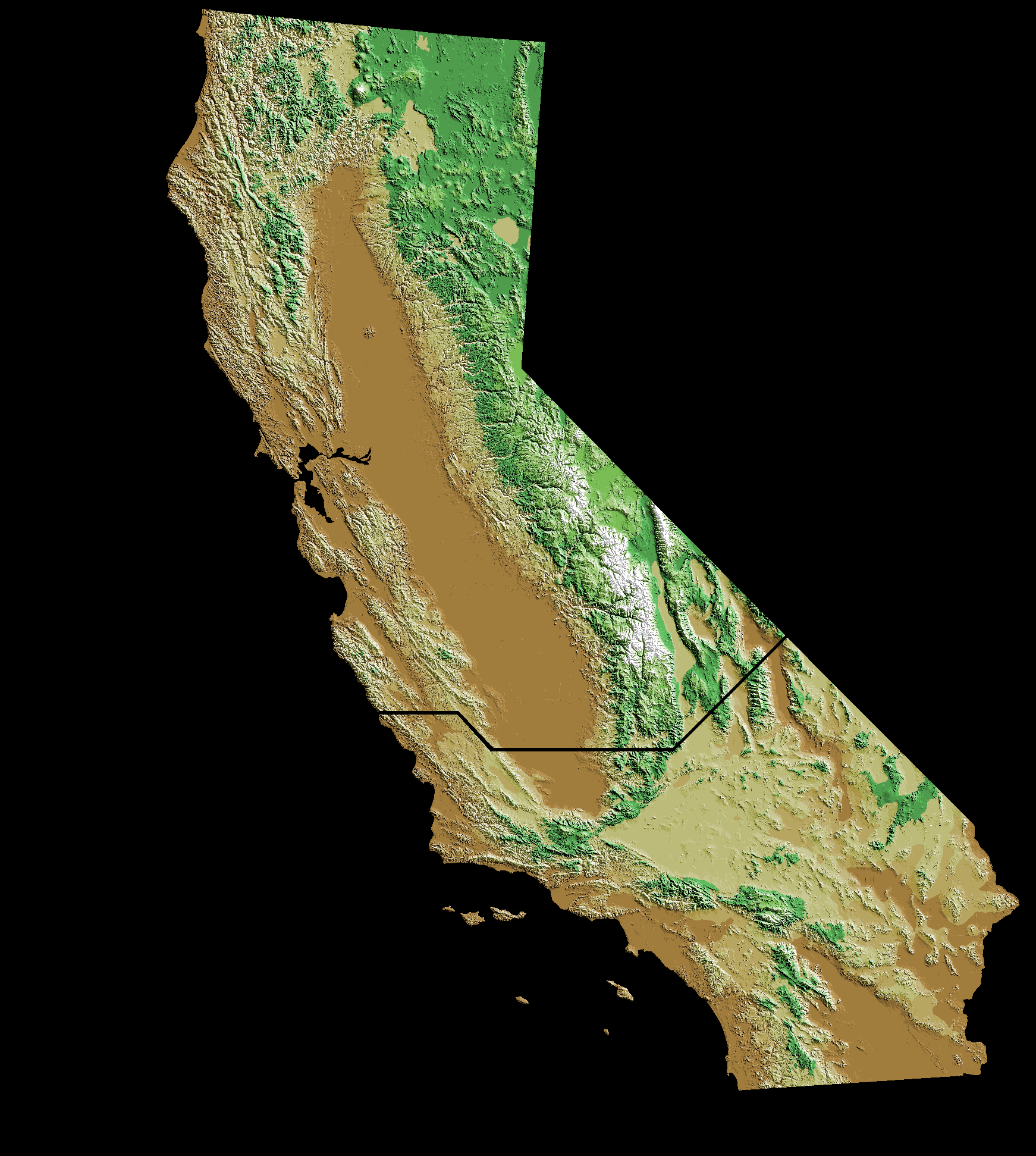
The 1859 Pico Act proposed to split off the southern third of California to create a new territory.

Pico authored what became known as the Pico Act in February 1859, to partition California into two states, splitting the north two-thirds off as "California", and the south one-third to be called the Territory of Colorado, or whatever name the local populace preferred. The reason for the split was anger at taxation without representation: the southern Spanish-speaking Californios had been paying state taxes, but no state programs had been brought to their lands. The bill passed both houses of the state legislature and was sent to a vote in the affected southern parts of the state. The southern voters overwhelmingly approved the plan, and it was signed by Governor John B. Weller on April 18, 1859. But the U.S. Congress never voted on the bill because of the tensions between the North and the South prior to the outbreak of the Civil War. California remained one state.

=== Senator and retirement ===
In 1860, he was elected by the state legislature as a California state senator from Los Ángeles.

On May 7, 1861, Pico, former assemblyman James R. Vineyard, and a partner won permission to make a deep slot-like road cut in the pass between the San Gabriel Mountains and the Santa Susana Mountains, making what would become known as the Beale's Cut Stagecoach Pass or San Fernando Pass. The state of California awarded them a 20-year contract to maintain the turnpike and collect tolls. Vineyard was elected to the California State Senate from Los Ángeles County (Pico's old seat) four months later, but would die in office. A landowner and surveyor named Edward Beale was appointed by newly elected President Abraham Lincoln as the federal Surveyor General of California and Nevada. Beale challenged the general's loyalty to the new president and in 1863, Beale was awarded the right to collect the toll in the pass.

Andrés Pico's Rancho ex-Mission San Fernando was confiscated by a federal decree in 1864, which said that he "did not own and never did own" it. Reduced to a pauper, he retired in Los Ángeles. Ex-Mission San Fernando fell into ruins until the mid-20th century, when the Roman Catholic Church conserved about one fourth of the old mission quadrangle.

Since Pico's death, the bulk of the old mission has never been restored. The site of the main mission buildings are now occupied by a parochial high school, including the old, monumental front facing east toward the former Fort Tejon Road. The sites of the Butterfield stagecoach stables, and the outbuildings and storage buildings of Don Andrés's ranch and hacienda, have been lost under development of the modern urban community of Mission Hills.

== Personal life ==
Pico married Catarina Moreno, granddaughter of Los Ángeles poblador Jose Cesario Moreno, in San Diego. They had one son, Rómulo, and adopted a daughter, also named Catarina.

== Legacy ==
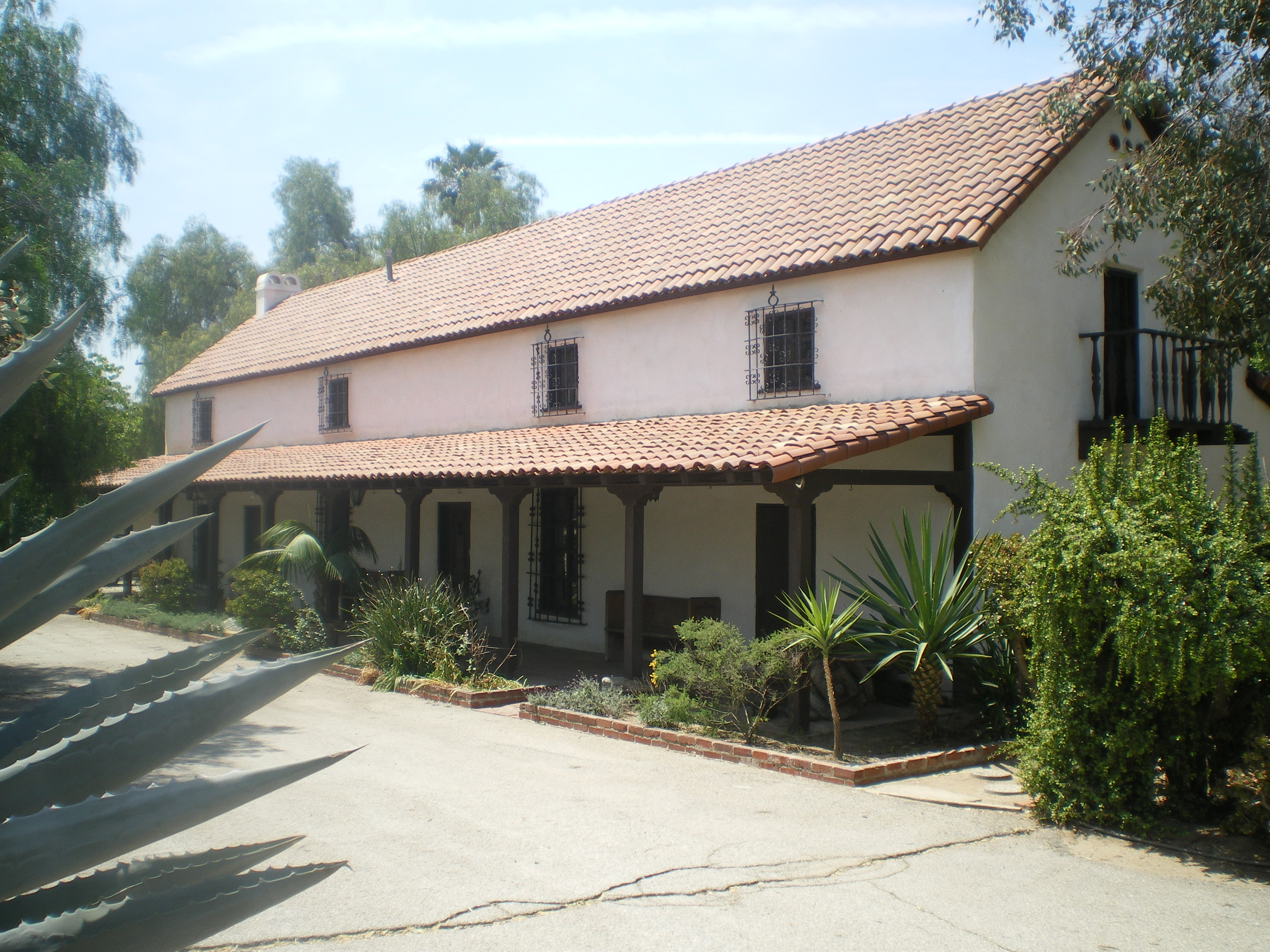
Rómulo Pico Adobe, 2008

- His son's home, the Andrés Pico Adobe, is the oldest residence in the San Fernando Valley. Having deteriorated when empty, it was restored by new owners in the early 1930s, who also extended it with an addition. Now operated as a house museum, it holds the archives of the San Fernando Valley Historical Society. Identified as a significant property in the 1935 Historic American Buildings Survey, Andrés Pico Adobe is listed on the National Register of Historic Places and as a Los Ángeles Historic-Cultural Monument.
- Pico Boulevard, running from Santa Monica to downtown Los Ángeles, is named for Pío Pico, the former governor, but also honors the entire Pico family.

== Gallery ==
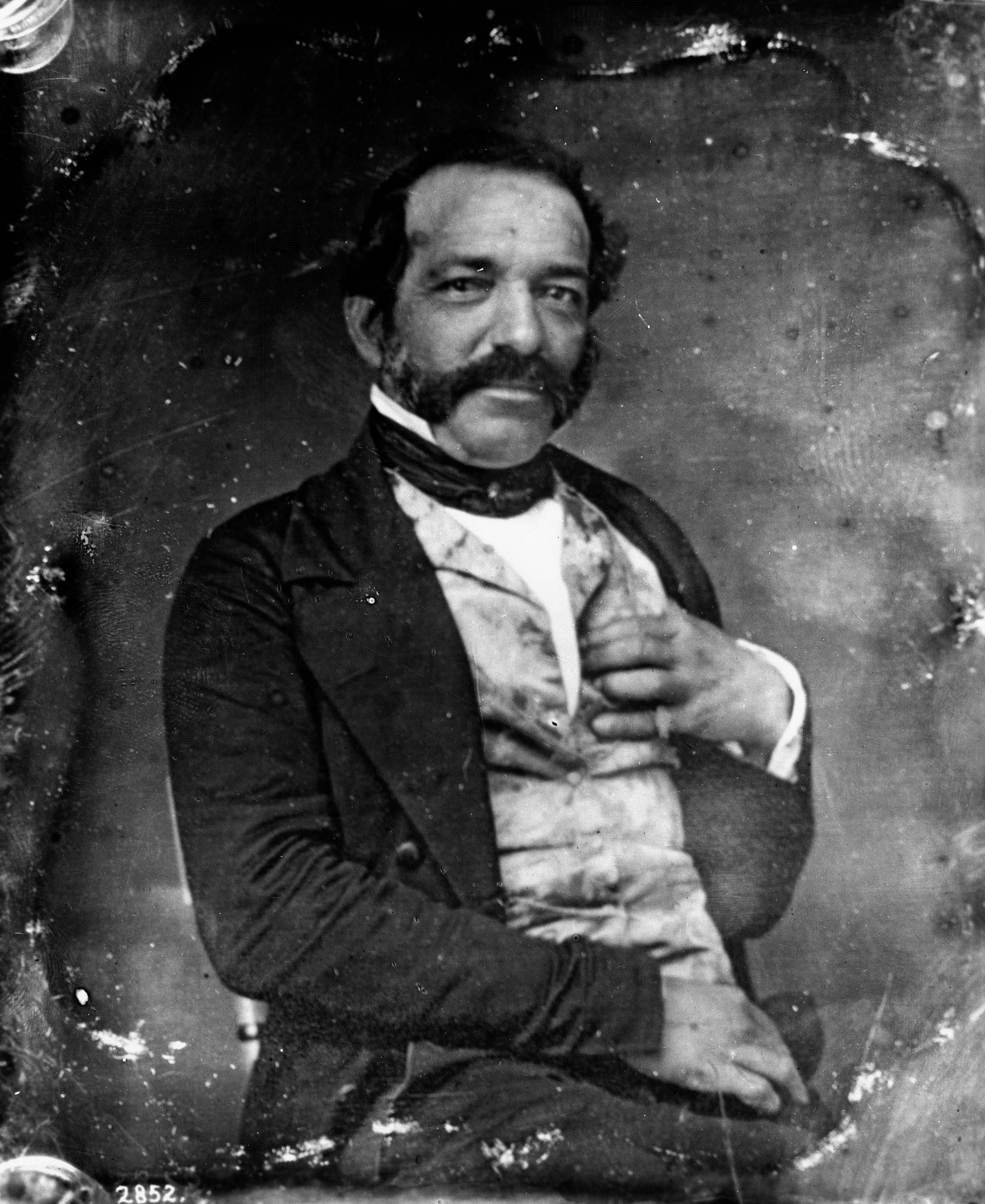
Pico in an undated photograph

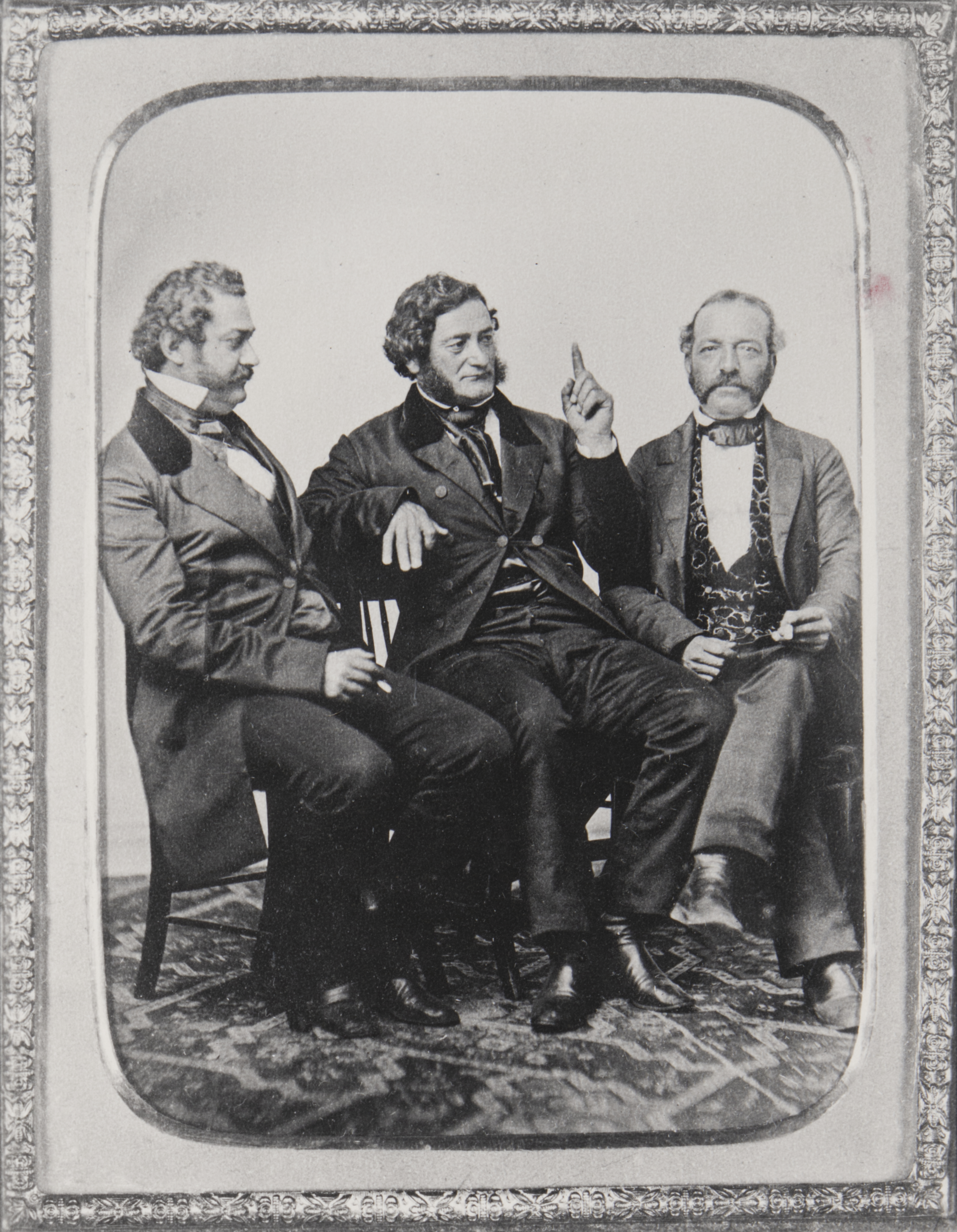
Portrait of Pablo de la Guerra, Salvador Vallejo and Andrés Pico

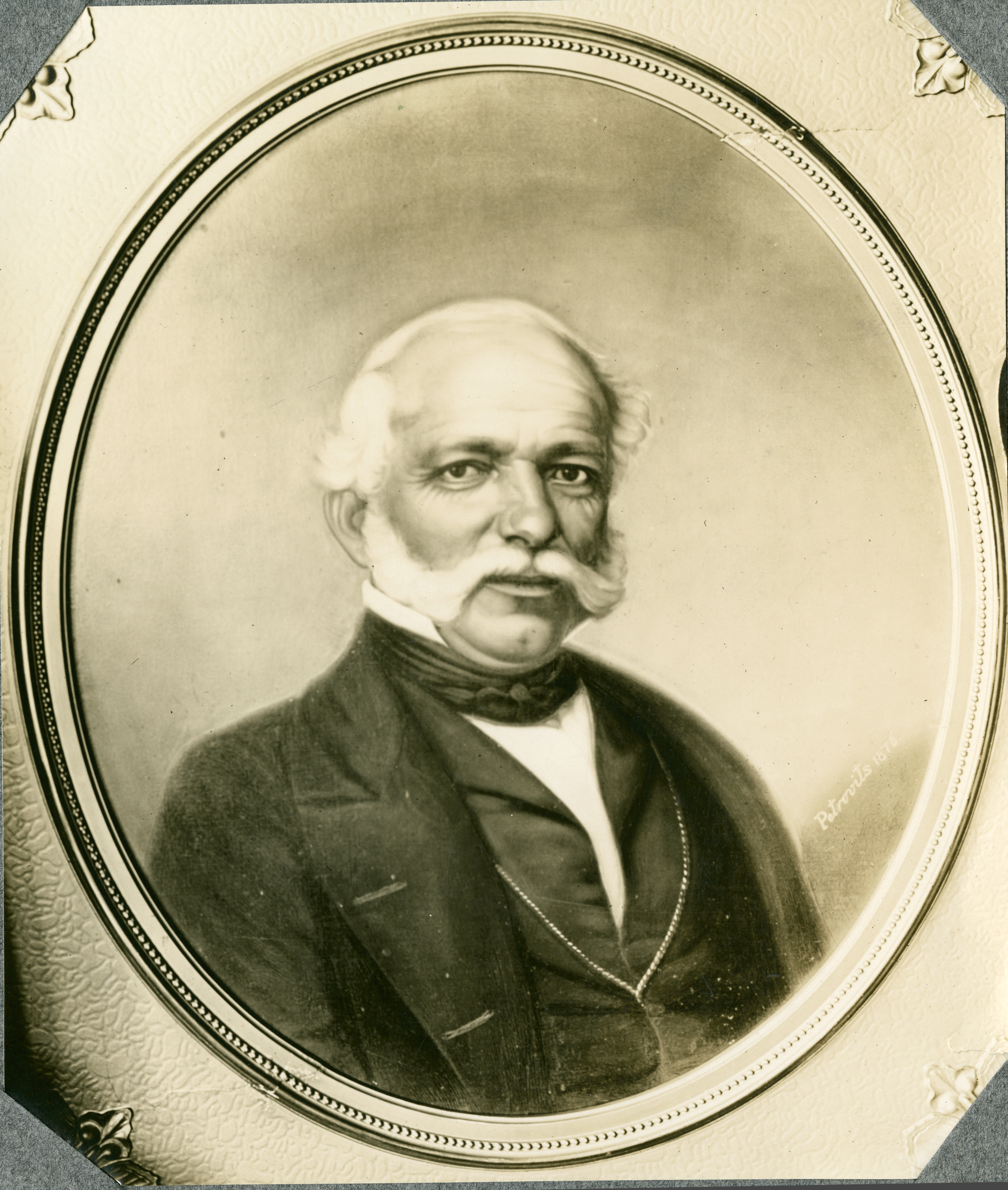
Oil painting of Pico by N. Paul Petrovits

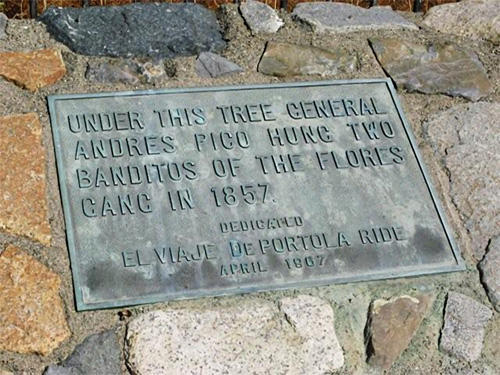
Plaque commemorating the lynching of the Flores Daniel Gang
