= Pío Pico =

Last governor of Alta California (1801–1894)

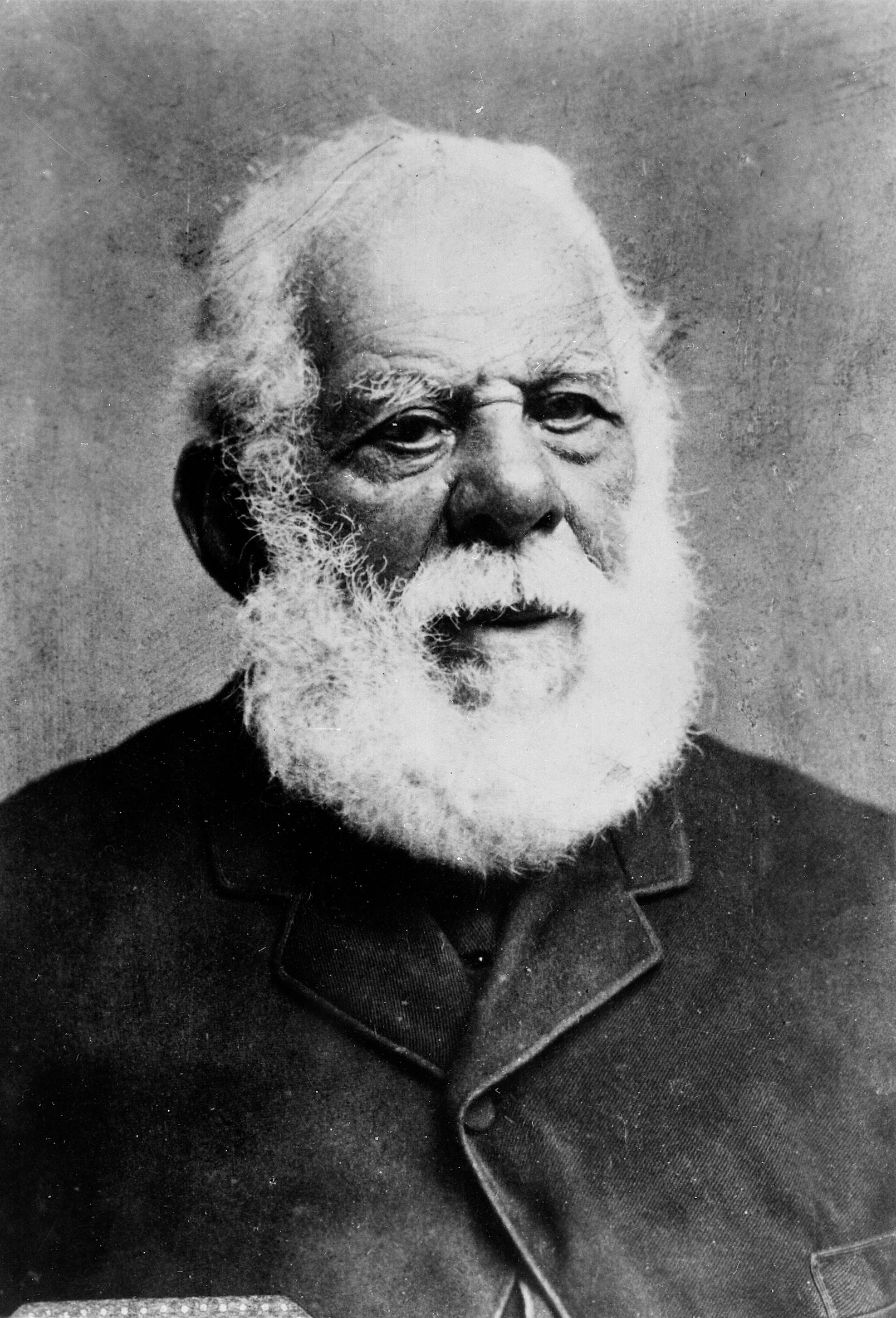
- Pico c. 1891–1892

10th Governor of the Californias
- In office February 22, 1845 – August 10, 1846
- Preceded by: Manuel Micheltorena
- Succeeded by: José María Flores (Self-appointed Governor of California); John Drake Sloat (As the U.S. Military Governor of California) (Note: Sloat's term as the state's U.S.-appointed military governor began on July 7, 1846, while Pico was still the state's Mexico-appointed governor. In October of 1846, Flores self-stylized himself as the governor and continued to fight U.S. forces into 1847. Flores is sometimes excluded from lists of California governors from that period, although other sources list him and Pico's brother Andrés Pico as governors as well. However, even sources that do list them still refer to Pío Pico as the last governor of Alta California.)

Interim Governor of Alta California
- In office January 27, 1832 – February 18, 1832; Disputed
- Preceded by: Manuel Victoria
- Succeeded by: Agustín V. Zamorano (North); José María de Echeandía (South)

Member of the Diputación de Alta California for Los Angeles
- In office 1828-1832, 1844-1845
- Constituency: Pueblo de Los Ángeles

Comisionado of Mission San Luis Rey de Francia
- In office 1835–1840

Member of the Los Angeles Common Council
- In office Not seated

Personal details
- Born: Pío de Jesús Pico IV; May 5, 1801 Mission San Gabriel Arcángel; San Gabriel, Alta California, New Spain
- Died: September 11, 1894 (aged 93) Los Angeles, California, U.S.
- Party: California Republican Party
- Spouse: María Ignacia Alvarado
- Children: Disputed (see Personal life for more details)
- Relatives: Andrés Pico (brother); Pico family
- Profession: Entrepreneur, politician

Pío de Jesús Pico IV (May 5, 1801 – September 11, 1894) was a Californio politician, ranchero, and entrepreneur, famous for serving as the last governor of Alta California under Mexican rule from 1845 to 1846. He briefly held the governorship during a disputed period in 1832. A member of the prominent Pico family of California, he was one of the wealthiest men in California at the time and a hugely influential figure in Californian society, continuing as a citizen of the nascent U.S. state of California.

His legacy can be seen in the numerous places named after him, such as the city of Pico Rivera, Pico Boulevard in Los Angeles, Pio Pico State Historic Park, and numerous schools that bear his name.

== Early years ==
=== Ancestry ===
Pío Pico was of Native American, Spanish, Italian, and African ancestry. His earliest known ancestor is the Count Mazzi, who lived during the early 1600s in the town of Pico in Central Italy. Pico's great grandfather, the Spanish-born Pío de Jesús Pico III, likely came to Mexico during the first or second decade of the 18th century. (Note: Pío Pico III's date of immigration to colonial Mexico came from a 1986 pamphlet for the Pío Pico State Historic Park by Howard Holter. However, Holter's source for this is unknown.)

Pico's paternal grandmother, María Jacinta Vastida, (Note: Pico's grandmother's name is usually spelled Vastida, but has occasionally been spelled Bastida) was listed in the 1790 census as a mulata (Spanish-African). His paternal grandfather, Santiago de la Cruz Pico, was described as a mestizo (Native American-Spanish) in the same census. Santiago was one of the soldiers who accompanied Juan Bautista de Anza on the expedition that left Tubac, Arizona for California in 1775 to explore the region and colonize it. Santiago and María Jacinta were from the provinces of what are now Sinaloa and Sonora.

=== Birth and childhood ===
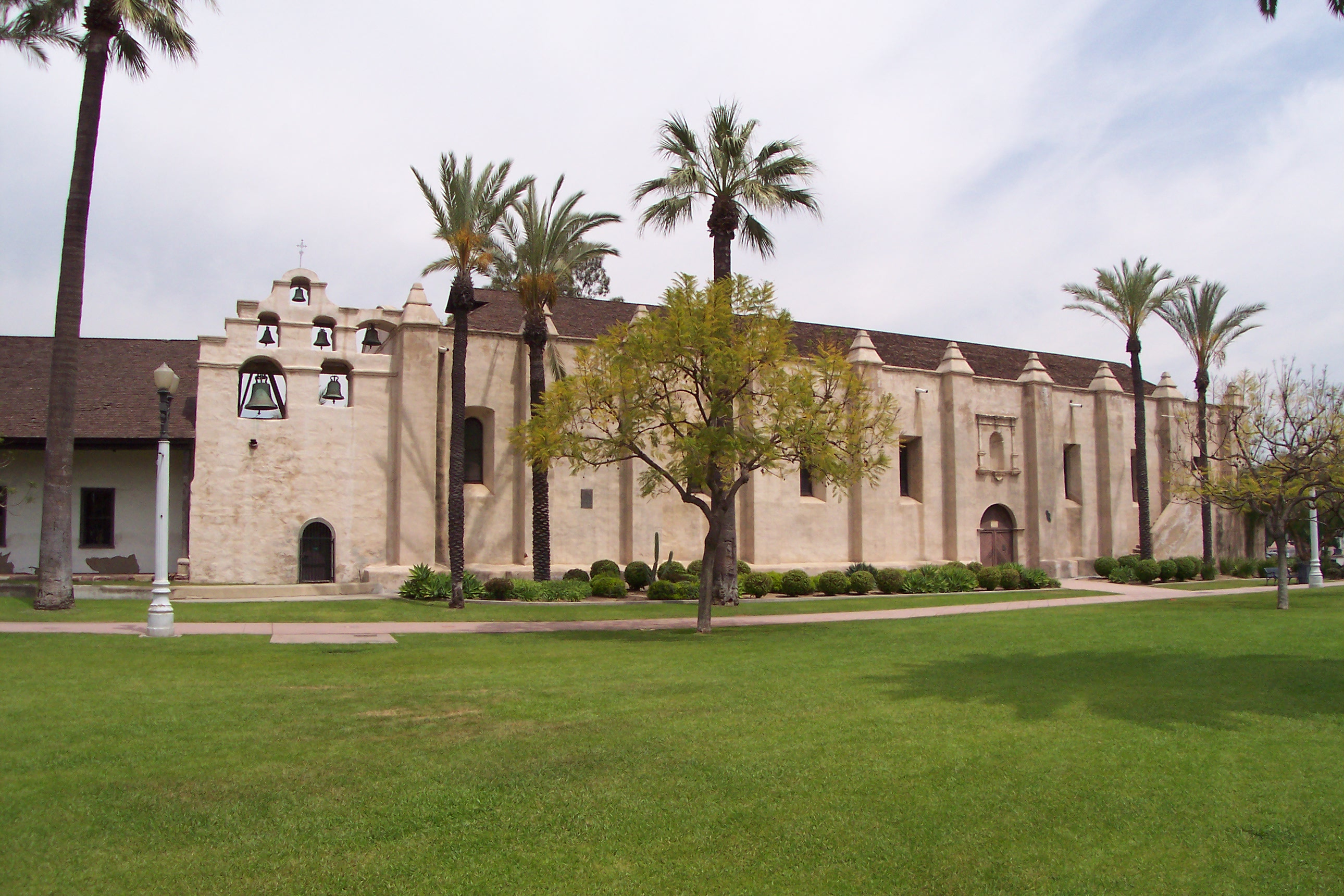
Mission San Gabriel Arcángel, where Pico was born

Pío de Jesús Pico IV was born at Mission San Gabriel Arcángel on May 5, 1801, to José María Pico and his wife María Eustaquia Gutiérrez, with the aid of midwife Eulalia Pérez de Guillén Mariné. He was the fourth of his parents' ten children, and their second son. Among his siblings was his younger brother General Andrés Pico, born in 1810.

In 1805, the family moved to San Diego. José María Pico worked as a guard for mission communities, and would move to different missions as his work required. Pío Pico spent much of his childhood outside the tiny settlement of Mission San Diego. There, he received a modest education. He often read from the Bible at Mass, and felt the immense presence of the church, as it dominated the economy, although he was not profoundly religious. At the Presidio of San Diego, José Antonio Carrillo, who later married Pico's sister Estéfana, taught Pico how to read. This would be important to his career, as California law required literacy among elected officials. Carrillo would have a great influence on Pico's youth and political rise.

He took an interest in his father's work, and in 1815, he was temporarily placed in charge of the mission guards by local officials while his father was away. His father and other guards defended the missions from rebellions by Native Californians, who resented being forced to convert to Christianity as part of attempts to "civilize" them.

The Spanish government gave plots of land for housing and agriculture to some of the settlers in the area, and used them as incentives to recruit soldiers. José María Pico was never given any plots. José María eventually began to support the Mexican War of Independence from Spain. In 1811, he and sixty other soldiers were arrested by Spanish authorities on charges of conspiracy and imprisoned. He was eventually released, and the family moved back to San Gabriel. However, José María died in September 1819 in the same mission in which his son had been born. After this, Pío Pico was left in charge of his large family, and would have to continue without owning any land, which would remain a necessary component for entering California politics.

=== Mexican independence ===
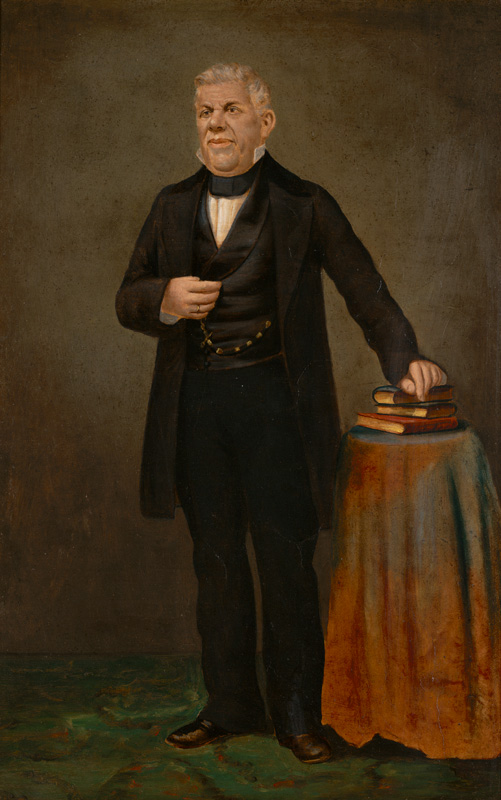
Portrait of Pico held by the California State Library, c. 1847

Following his father's death, Pico moved back to San Diego around the year 1820. He became a merchant, selling liquor, groceries, and dry goods. He would open a general store where he also sold furniture and mules. His occupation also allowed him to travel the state and meet notable Californios. Pico's sisters married into prominent California families, which would be important to Pico's political rise. He kept close connections with these families. These marriages also gave the Pico family their first sense of financial security. Concepción Pico married Domingo Carrillo in 1810, María Casimira Pico married José Joaquín Ortega in 1821, and Estéfana married José Antonio Carrillo in 1823. In 1824, Pío and Andrés Pico built their mother a home by Presidio Hill in San Diego.

After Mexico's successful independence in 1821, the First Mexican Empire was created. However, Mexico's emperor, Agustín de Iturbide, clashed with liberal revolutionary generals such as Guadalupe Victoria, Vicente Guerrero, and Antonio López de Santa Anna, who resisted Iturbide's conservative policies. In 1823, Iturbide was forced to abdicate amid revolts, and soon after, the First Mexican Republic was created. Two rival factions developed: Liberals and Centralists. Centralists believed that Mexico's states should be controlled by an elitist government, as well as the continued heavy influence of the Catholic Church. Liberals wanted Mexico to become a federal republic, where the federal government shared power with the states, and supported secular education. California leaned more towards liberalism, as their political culture had developed largely separately from the federal government seated in Mexico City.

Pico was eventually appointed as the secretary to a captain named Pablo de la Portillà. In 1827, Portillà charged merchant Luis Brigas with misappropriation of funds, and brought the matter to a military tribunal. Brigas defended himself by stating that, "the civilians were the sacred core of the nation and that the military were nothing more than servants". The response affected Pico so much that he broke the line of command and sided with Brigas, which resulted in Pico temporarily being placed in jail. The incident was the beginning of Pico's support for liberalism and the first major political event of his life. Pico also became a supporter of California's liberal governor, José María de Echeandía, who became California's governor in 1825. Echeandía was a supporter of secularization, which would involve releasing natives from Church control and redistributing excess land to them.

== Early political career ==
=== Diputado ===
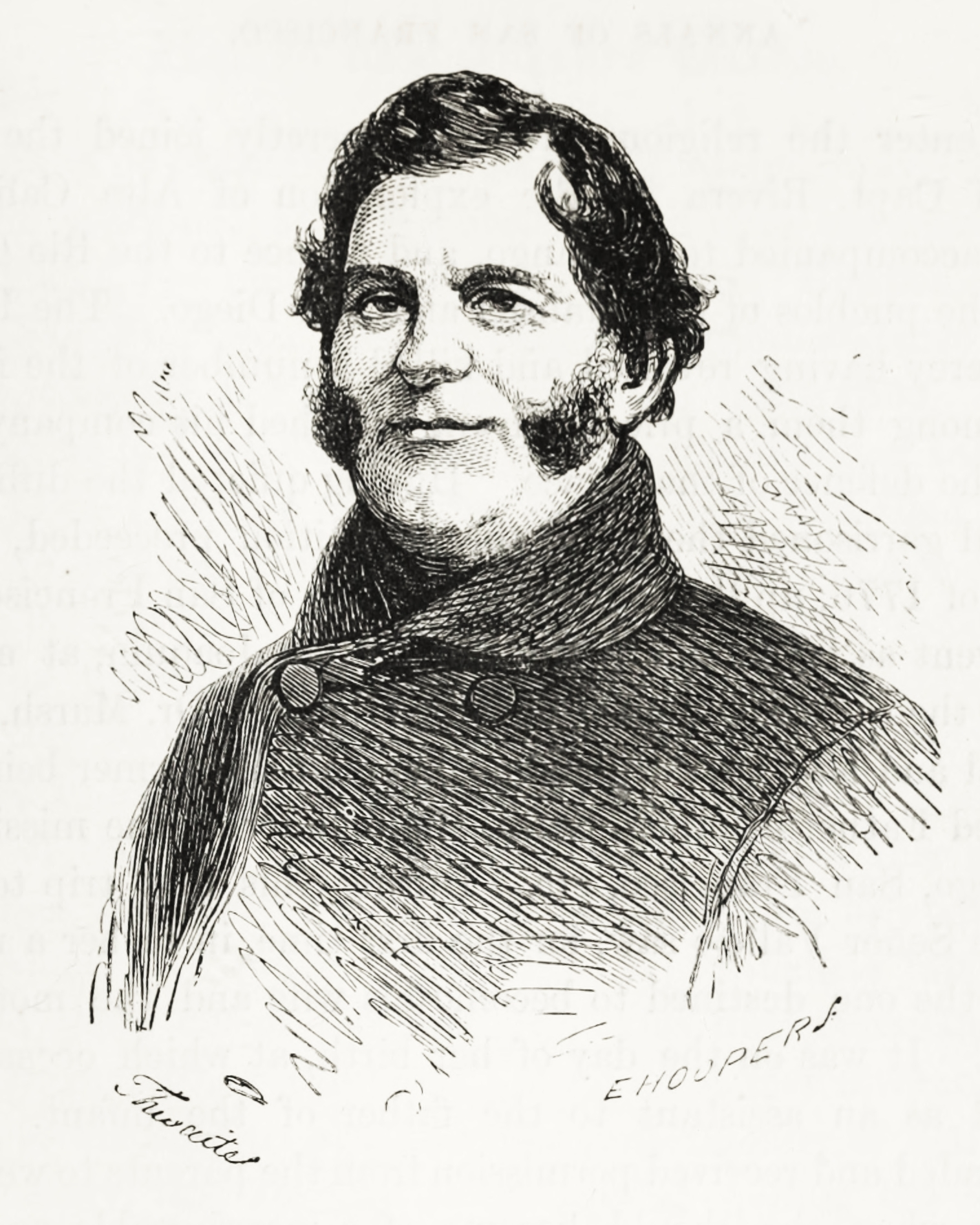
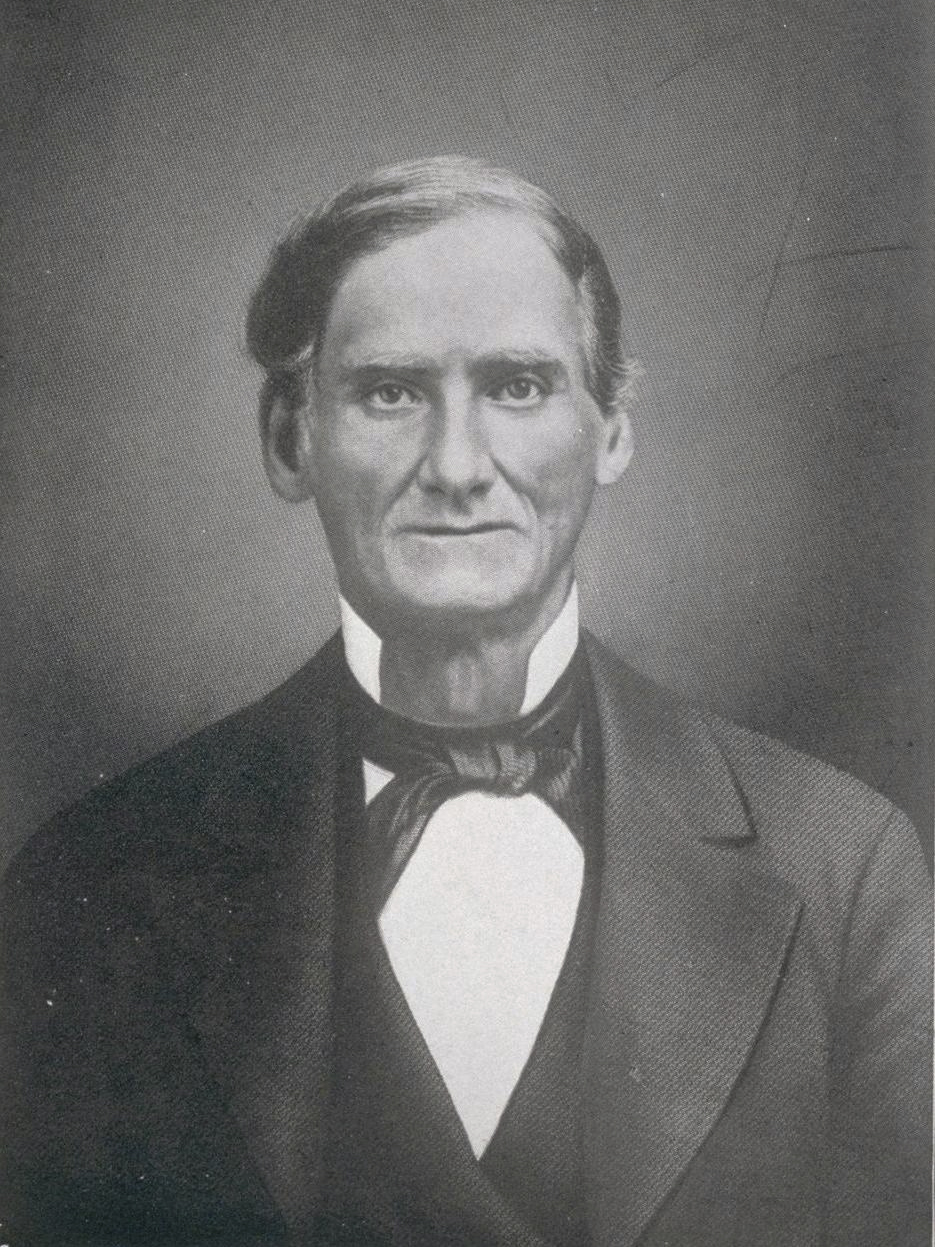
Mariano Guadalupe Vallejo and Juan Bandini, members of the Diputación de Alta California and allies of Pico

With the help of his family connections, Pico was able to enter politics. By 1826, he had been elected to San Diego's town council and in 1828 he was elected to California's legislative body, the Diputación de Alta California. In 1829, Echeandía gave Pico Rancho Jamul, which was the first major piece of land he owned. After receiving the ranch, Pico began stocking it with cattle and hiring workers to cultivate a cattle empire and become part of the landowning elite. By 1831, California's diputación consisted of Pico, Ortega, Juan Bautista Alvarado, Mariano Guadalupe Vallejo, Antonio María Osio, Santiago Argüello, Juan Bandini, and Tomás Yorba, all of whom were interrelated, which allowed them to take complete control of territorial politics.

After the presidency of Guadalupe Victoria, the liberal Vicente Guerrero became president, but after he was given emergency powers to repel a Spanish invasion, conservatives accused him of despotism. Led by Vice President Anastasio Bustamante, the conservatives launched a rebellion in late 1829. Upon becoming president, Bustamante designated the conservative centralist Lucas Alamán to head his cabinet, who sought to remove liberal opposition from federal and state governments. Alamán removed Echeandía as governor, and sent Manuel Victoria to replace him in 1830. Prior to Victoria's arrival, Echeandía issued decrees authorizing secularization, which he knew Victoria would oppose. Pico and other liberals in California supported Echeandía's decrees.

By 1831, Pico was the primer vocal of the diputación, being its most senior member. Victoria began ignoring the diputación's demands, such as one instance when Pico demanded Victoria meet with him, which Victoria considered a person attack, and stated that he would decide when the diputación would meet. In a government circular on September 31 that year, Victoria stated his intention to end Echeandía's secularization policies, and accused the diputados (diputación members) of being illegally elected. He then suspended it entirely. He then began replacing the civilian government with a military one, and banished prominent critics who spoke out against these policies, such as José Antonio Carrillo and Abel Stearns. This alienated several key Californio families. In late September, Pico wrote a contestación (a response) to Victoria's circular, stating that the diputación had the right to rebel against the governor, and argued against the expulsions and the nullification of local elections and diputados. He portrayed himself as a patriot defending Mexican law, and in bandos (pronouncements that posted on public buildings), he instilled the image of himself as a fighter for the liberty of common citizens. His prominent position gave his manifesto public weight.

Pico received word from Carrillo that Victoria planned to kill him and Bandini. Victoria also dismissed Bandini from his political position around that time. Pico responded by building an opposition including many of the most influential Southern Californians, such as Carrillo, Bandini, and Stearns. They met at Pico's Rancho Jamul to gather information on Victoria's forces and plan an armed revolt. At the same time, Victoria informed the federal government of his suspension of the diputación and his plans for military rule. With the diputación no longer recognized federally, the group chose to send Pico to Los Angeles to recruit influential men in the city to their cause. He found many of them imprisoned, but was still able to speak with them, and although he didn't get all the support he hoped for, he did find a significant amount.

=== 1831 revolt ===
After less than two months of planning, on November 29, 1831, Pico, Carrillo, and Bandini issued the Plan de San Diego, which placed them in open rebellion against Victoria. It accused Victoria of violating the law by issuing banishments without trial and of "promoting illegal arrests" in Los Angeles. It announced the suspension of Victoria as governor and military commandant and called for a legally elected interim official to run the government and military. On November 30, a group of 15 armed men, including Pico, Carrillo, Bandini, and Stearns marched into San Diego and surprised its garrison. Pico placed his friend Argüello under arrest, as well as Ygnacio del Valle. Pico took them to the home of Portillà, who had been arrested by Bandini, and the rebels attempted to convince the captured officers to join their rebellion. They refused, but promised to take no action against Pico's group for the remainder of the rebellion. The group released the officers, who allowed the rebels to take artillery pieces from the barracks, and soldiers from the garrison began joining them. They then went to Los Angeles, where they stormed the prison, released all prisoners, and then arrested the alcalde Vicente Sánchez.

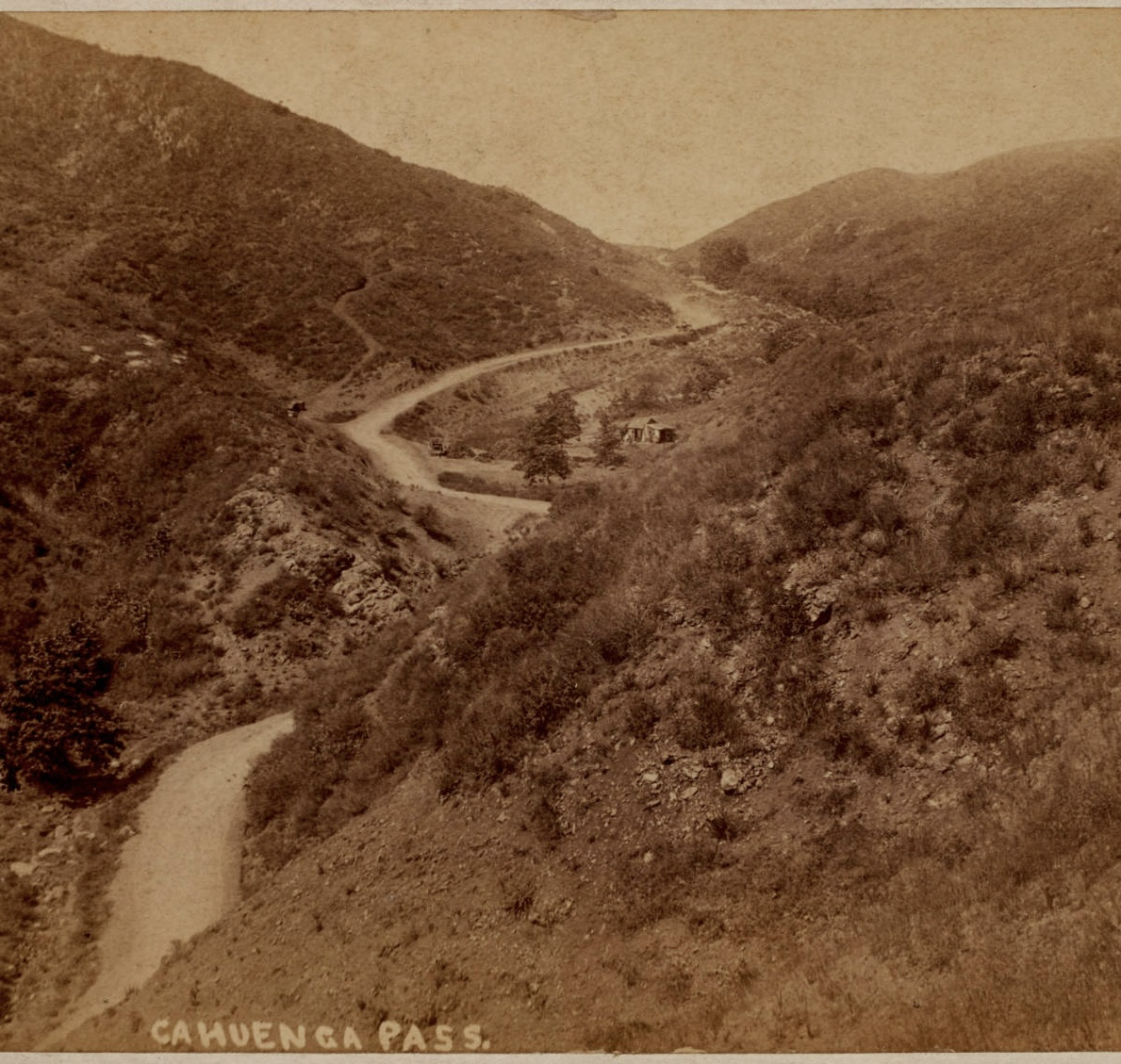
Pico's 1831 rebellion ended with a battle located at Cahuenga Pass, which is pictured above in 1888.

The rebellion was gaining public support, and its success convinced Portillà and Argüello to join on the condition that Echeandía lead it. Although he had little involvement prior, Echeandía agreed. This gave further legitimacy to the rebels, and more officers and soldiers joined them. In early December, Echeandía led his force of about 50 men into Los Angeles. The two groups met in Cahuenga Pass, with Victoria's force of about 30 against Pico and Echeandía's 150. The following battle was short. Pico's side gained the upper hand, with Victoria being critically wounded while retreating. The following day he formally surrendered. On December 9, he met with Echeandía to make plans abdicate and leave to another part of Mexico. The rebels celebrated their victory without fear of retaliation from the federal government, as they lacked the resources to send a force to the state and keep resupplying them.

== First governorship ==
=== Echeandía dispute ===
Vallejo signed the Plan de San Diego soon after, which united the North and South of California under it. On January 10, 1832, the restored diputación met in Los Angeles. This time, it consisted of Pico, Vallejo, Alvarado, Ortega, Osio, Argüello, and Yorba. With Victoria gone, they were free to continue secularization and governance of the state. They set aside any political differences they had to select a new head of government. An 1822 law stated that the primer vocal would assume the governorship, which was still Pico. The church resisted giving the group religious objects needed for the swearing-in, so Alvarado broke in to get them. Afterwards, Vallejo inaugurated Pico as the governor on January 27. Pico's governance had the support of San Diego.

On February 1, Echeandía wrote to Pico about his concerns that Pico's election was illegitimate. Pico didn't reply, and then in a letter to Los Angeles alcalde Manuel Dominguez, Echeandía admitted the legality of Pico's selection as governor. However, he also clarified his opposition to Pico's governance based on the illegality of the rebellion. Dominguez then refused to accept Pico as governor. Echeandía believed that since Victoria passed the office to him before he left, that he, not Pico, gave him the governorship. On February 16, Echeandía issued an ultimatum to Pico: If he didn't step down, Echeandía would hold him and the diputación responsible for the rebellion to the nation, which ignored Echeandía's own role in it. The group placated Echeandía's desire, and Pico made no further claims to the office and issued to acts after this point. Echeandía was able to assume the governorship on February 18.

Some historians do not view Pico's first claim to the governorship as legitimate. Historian Hubert Howe Bancroft states that Pico's claim was illegitimate, historian Paul Gray describes the revolt as if Pico never held the office, while Pico's biographer Carlos Manuel Salomon describes Pico as the governor during this period. Bancroft notes that it is customary for historians to list Pico's first governorship between those of Victoria and Figueroa.

=== Aftermath ===
Shortly after Pico's resignation, Agustín V. Zamorano, Victoria's secretary, began a revolt in Northern Alta California. He and his allies rejected the authority of Echeandía and the diputación. By March 22, the diputación and Echeandía had reached an accord with Echeandía, and Pico issued a circular to the ayuntamientos requesting they maintain peace and avoid joining Zamorano's revolt. Pico did not challenge Echeandía or Zamorano for the governorship and sought to end public disruption. By early May, a truce placed Zamorano and Echeandía in military control of the north and south, respectively. Meanwhile, the federal government sent brigadier general José Figueroa to assume the governorship, but he would not arrive until the following year, and until then the massive territory would not have a single leader. Figueroa arrived on January 14, 1833, reuniting the state.

== Interim career ==
=== Secularization and marriage ===
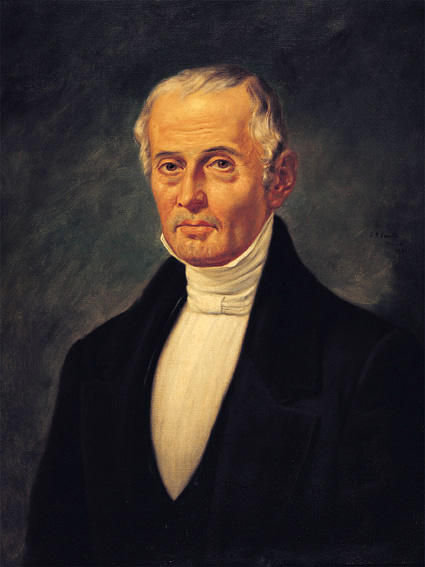
President Valentín Gómez Farías (pictured) ordered the full secularization of California's missions

As governor, Figueroa opposed full secularization, arguing that it would hurt California's economy and that natives required more "civilizing". He issued a law giving partial emancipation to those who had practiced Christianity for twelve years, but placed recalcitrant natives back under mission authority. By 1833, the Liberals, led by Antonio López de Santa Anna and Valentín Gómez Farías (Note: In this Mexican name, the surname is Gómez and the second or maternal family name is Farías.), removed the conservative government. Gómez Farías implemented many liberal reforms, including secularization in the Californias. This conflicted with Figueroa's gradual plan, but in 1834 he complied. He created the Reglamento provisional para la secularización de las Misiones (Spanish: Provisional regulation for the secularization of the missions), which secularized ten missions and created plans to secularize the rest. It created a comisionado (Spanish: administrator) to emancipate and redistribute property to the natives, and to take mission inventory and pay debts with the governor's approval. After redistribution, this would leave excess land that Figueroa believed could improve the economy. However, there was a lack of regulations on the comisionado and on native labor requirements.

Pico married María Ignacia Alvarado on February 24, 1834 at La Iglesia de Nuestra Señora la Reina de los Ángeles. She was the daughter of sergeant Francisco Javier Alvarado. His son, Francisco Javier II, was alcalde of Los Angeles and had married Pico's sister María Tomasa Pico in 1829. The reception was held across the street at the home of his brother-in-law José Antonio Carrillo. The reception lasted eight days. Pico's best man was then-governor Figueroa. By this point, the two had formed a strong friendship. That year, Pico ran to become alcalde of San Diego, but on December 21, he lost to Juan María Osuna.

In 1837, Pico was the godfather at the baptism of John "Juan" Forster, an English-born immigrant who converted to Catholicism and became a Mexican citizen to own land. The two men would later refer to this event when asking each other for political favors. Forster would soon after marry Pico's sister Isidora Ygnacia Pico, making Forster his son-in-law as well.

=== Mission San Luis Rey and Alvarado governorship ===
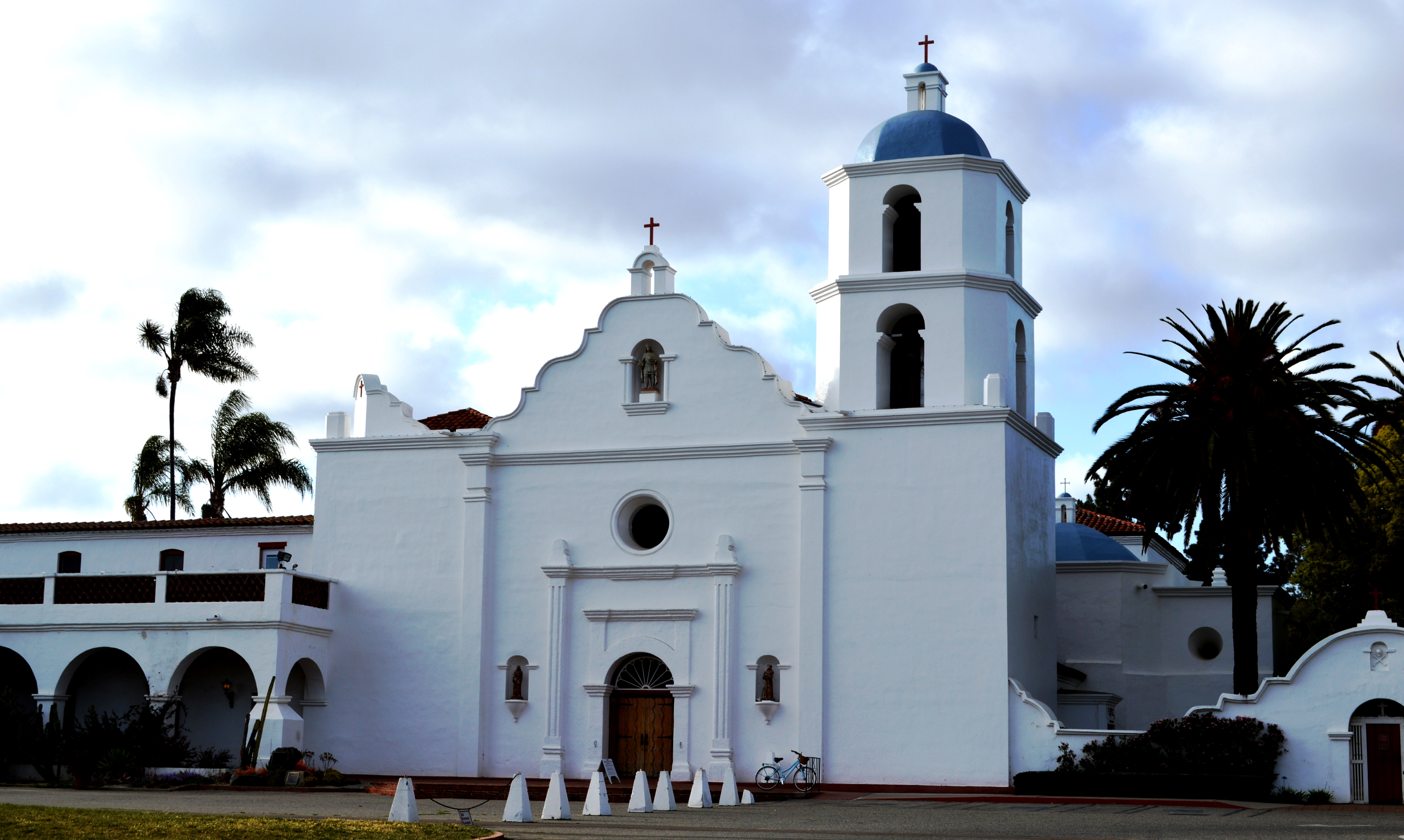
Mission San Luis Rey de Francia, which Pico became comisionado of in 1835. He sought to profit off of it, and became known for his cruel and authoritative treatment of the natives there.

In 1835, Pico became the comisionado of Mission San Luis Rey de Francia, which may have been influenced by his friendship with Figueroa. Pico succeeded Portillà in the role. As comisionado, Pico faced resistance from natives at San Luis Rey, as they had been skeptical of emancipation and continued to face mistreatment following secularization. Laws had given natives the ability to establish pueblos and elect their own alcaldes, who would interact with the Mexican government on behalf of their people. Two pueblos and alcaldes were established by the Luiseños (natives at San Luis Rey). To overcome this, Pico worked with the local encargado de justicia (Spanish: officer of justice). The encargado could arrest people at the mission for crimes, but the act creating this position was vague on what constituted a crime, and the encargado could arrest a native for simply refusing to work. Punishments involved imprisonment in chains for up to eight days and possibly an equal amount of time doing forced labor. According to Pico, he once had a Luiseño alcalde chained and lashed fifty times for attacking a Mexican mayordomo. In 1836, Pico also became the encargado de justicia, which gave him further control over the Luiseños.

The Luiseños soon came to despise Pico. According to the Luiseño Julio César, Pico was their most abusive administrator. Pico mandated that all Luiseños remove their hats when he walked by, and allowed his cattle to graze on native pueblos. He also sought to profit off of the mission, and by 1835, his inventory valued the mission at $194,436, which was far ahead of the others. A Luiseño coalition elected the educated Pablo Apis to represent them, and in June they petitioned the alcalde of San Diego to remove Pico. Pico learned of this and requested military assistance from the San Diego Presidio. Comandante Nicolás Gutiérrez gave Apis permission to travel to San Diego, but Pico had Apis arrested. Apis was placed in jail, but a thousand Luiseños protested outside his quarters, demanding his release. Fearing for his life, Pico unconditionally released Apis. However, Pico had requested the aid of troops from San Juan Capistrano, and after they arrived, he again arrested Apis. He forced Apis to join the military company in Monterey to eliminate him as a threat, and had the military arrest more natives. A month later, Luiseño protests continued, with them unsuccessfully petitioning governor Mariano Chico to remove Pico.

Pico made some concessions to the Luiseños. When Luiseños at the pueblo of Las Flores complained about their officials, Pico personally traveled there and replaced them. In November 1836, Pico prevented Portillà from acquiring native property rights in Agua Caliente, although he took some of them for himself.

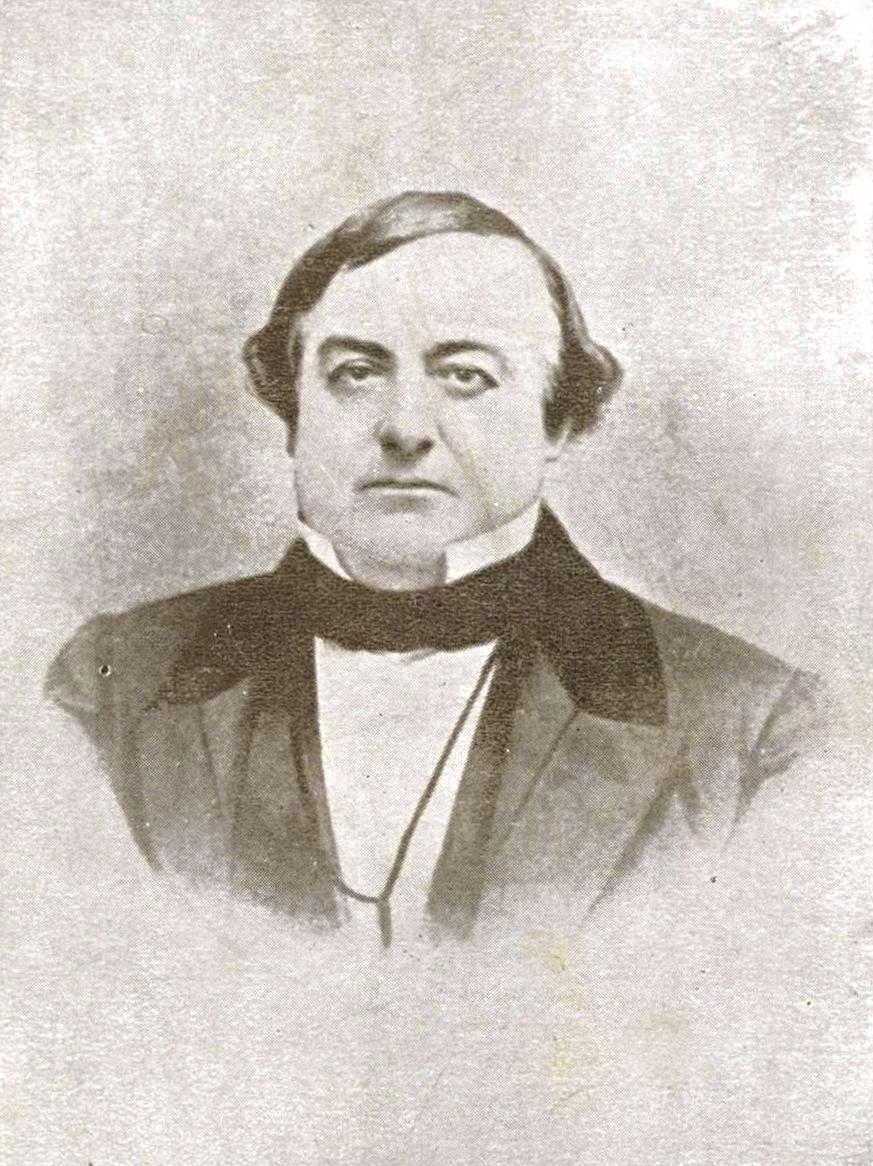
Pico opposed the governorship of his former ally Juan Bautista Alvarado (pictured), which led to Pico's brief imprisonment.

By 1836, a conservative government had regained control of the federal government, and it enacted the Siete Leyes (Spanish: Seven Laws), which diminished the power of the states and created the Centralist Republic of Mexico. That year, Northern California politician Juan Bautista Alvarado led a revolt against Governor Gutiérrez and declared California independent from Mexico. He elevated the diputación to a junta. However, Pico, Carlos Antonio Carrillo, and other Southern California politicians feared that Alvarado would favor the north. Pico and his allies challenged Alvarado's government, supporting Carrillo instead. In 1837 the conflict erupted into a revolt, which Pico joined. By March 1838, Alvarado's army had defeated the southern rebels. Carrillo surrendered, and Pico and several others were briefly imprisoned. Eventually, the federal government recognized Alvarado as governor, which ended the conflict on all sides.

While Pico was imprisoned, natives had attacked burned down Rancho Jamul. Pico's mother and sisters escaped due to a warning from a native servant, but multiple staff members and their relatives were killed or disappeared. The natives had also begun leaving Mission San Luis Rey in large numbers. After Pico's release, he sought to regain control of and rebuild his empire with the aid of his family. His brother José Antonio was placed in charge of the military in San Luis Rey, in 1839, which allowed him to defend his brother against native uprisings. Meanwhile, Andrés Pico left the military to take charge of Rancho Jamul.

Back at San Luis Rey, the Luiseños continued refusing to work, and he needed more funding. In June 1839, he moved his mother and sister Jacinta into the mission, and sent a letter to his brother José Antonio, asking him to use his influence with Alvarado and Vallejo to sell their family home in San Diego. He also requested ownership of the lands of Temecula, which Alvarado gave him temporary custody of. There, he gave provisions to the natives while announcing his custody of the land, but they threatened him with an armed revolt. He was soon replaced with his son-in-law José Antonio Estudillo.

Pico also threatened to resign from the mission unless mission inspector general William Hartnell helped him round up fugitive Luiseños. Hartnell interviewed them, and learned of their complaints against Pico, including that his wasteful spending left them without necessities such as clothing. Hartnell then recommended that Alvarado discharge Pico, which he did. Pico fought against his dismissal, but to no avail, then paid off his debt to the mission of $170.00, and left in 1840.

=== Move to Los Angeles ===
Pico then purchased a home in Los Angeles Plaza, which was a city where many other rancheros and southern elites lived. In late 1840, Pico made another attempt to gain Temecula, but instead Alvarado gave him Rancho Santa Margarita, on the condition that he relinquish his claims to Temecula. Pico's Ranchos Jamul and Santa Margarita were entering full production, although they were managed by staff and Pico had little need to reside at either.

Pico did not directly involve himself in politics for the next few years, but was still influential with the state assembly. He, along with fellow assembly members Alvarado and José Castro, was placed on a list of candidates the federal government could choose to be governor, but Alvarado was ultimately chosen. Pico did not fight this, but argued that Los Angeles, not Alvarado's home of Monterey, should be the state's capital.

In 1840, Pico served as the tithe collector of Los Angeles, where he received five percent per commission. This position allowed him to meet residents of the city. Due to his wealth and the city's reliance on ranching professions, Pico became one of the most respected people in Los Angeles.

In 1842, Pico, still encargado de justicia, declared the land around Las Flores too arid for further settlement, which opened it for his ranching operations. He purchased Las Flores in 1844, and made his brother Andrés a co-recipient of the land. The two oversaw on the land the construction of a corral and an adobe house that they used to entertain guests and conduct business. Thanks to lands from Mission San Luis Rey, Pico's herds had grown, and his two ranches had made him wealthy.

=== Micheltorena governorship ===
In 1842, President López de Santa Anna replaced Alvarado as governor with the Brigadier General Manuel Micheltorena, due to the president's fear of another war with Americans after the Texas Revolution of the 1830s. Micheltorena brought with him to the state an army of three hundred criminal soldiers, who were viewed as a public nuisance by local Californios. Micheltorena was generous with land grants to foreign immigrants, which many locals, including Pico, viewed suspiciously. Pico suspected that Micheltorena may have been working with John Sutter to make California independent from Mexico.

== Second governorship ==
=== Return to power ===
In 1844, he was chosen as a leader of the California Assembly. In 1845, he was again appointed governor, succeeding the unpopular Manuel Micheltorena.

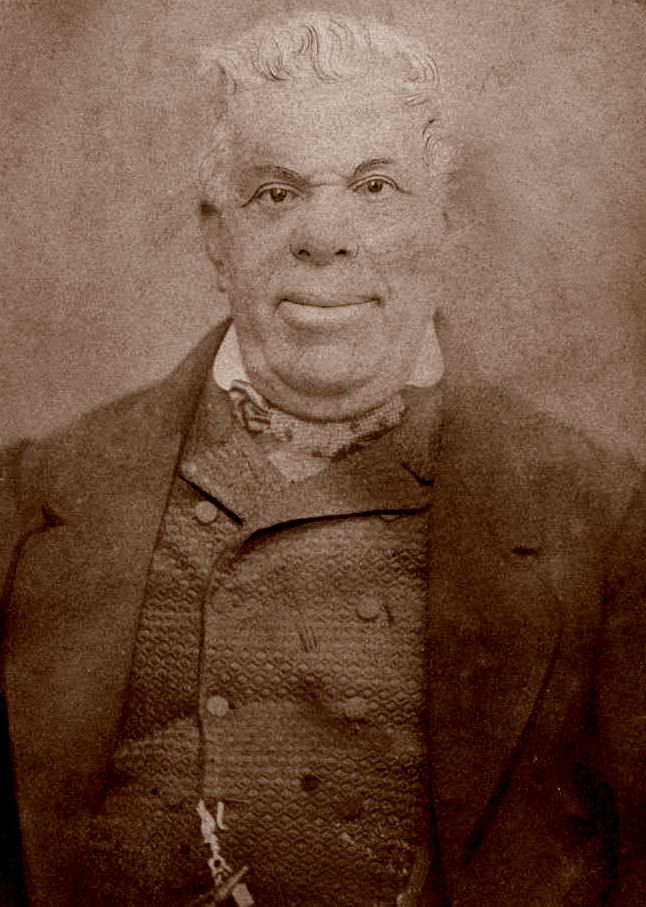
Pico, c. 1858

This occurred because, in late 1844, the Mexican province of California staged a revolt against the mother country. Micheltorena had been sent to California from Mexico, along with an army that had been recruited out of Mexico's worst jails. He had no money to feed his army, which then spread out to people's homes and farms "like a plague of locusts, stripping the countryside bare." This enraged the Californians and led to widespread hatred of Micheltorena. Women were not considered safe from the depredations of Micheltorena's army.

Juan Bautista Alvarado, the governor who had been forcibly replaced by Micheltorena, organized a rebellion against Micheltorena. Upon learning of the impending revolt, Micheltorena appointed John Sutter to lead troops in opposition. Sutter came to John Marsh, who had one of the largest ranchos in California, hoping he would join. Marsh wanted no part of it, but Sutter forced him to join his army against his will.

The two forces met in Cahuenga Pass, near Los Angeles, and fought the Battle of Providencia (also known as the Second Battle of Cahuenga Pass), which consisted primarily of an artillery duel. On the long march to the battle Marsh had taken every opportunity to dissuade the other soldiers from Micheltorena's cause. Ignoring Sutter, Marsh seized an opportunity in the battle to signal the other side for a parley. Many of the soldiers on each side were immigrants from the United States. Marsh convinced them that they had no reason to be fighting each other. At Marsh's urging, these soldiers on both sides united, abandoned Micheltorena's cause, and even captured Sutter. Micheltorena was defeated, and California-born Pio Pico was returned to the governorship.

=== Mexican–American War ===
Pico made Los Angeles the province's capital, although he left the treasury in the former capital, Monterey. In the year leading up to the Mexican–American War, Pico advocated that California achieve independence from Mexico and become a British protectorate.

When U.S. troops occupied Los Angeles and San Diego in 1846 during the Mexican–American War, Pico fled to Baja California, Mexico, to argue before the Mexican Congress for sending troops to defend Alta California. He was joined by his Secretary of State José Matías Moreno who traveled on Pico's behalf to request arms, munitions, men, and money. Pico did not return to Los Angeles until after the signing of the Treaty of Guadalupe Hidalgo, and he reluctantly accepted the transfer of sovereignty.

=== Return to California ===
Automatically granted United States citizenship, he was elected to the Los Angeles Common Council in 1853, but he did not assume office.

Pico helped establish the California Republican Party, allying with the larger Republican Party due to his anti-slavery stances.

== Business life ==
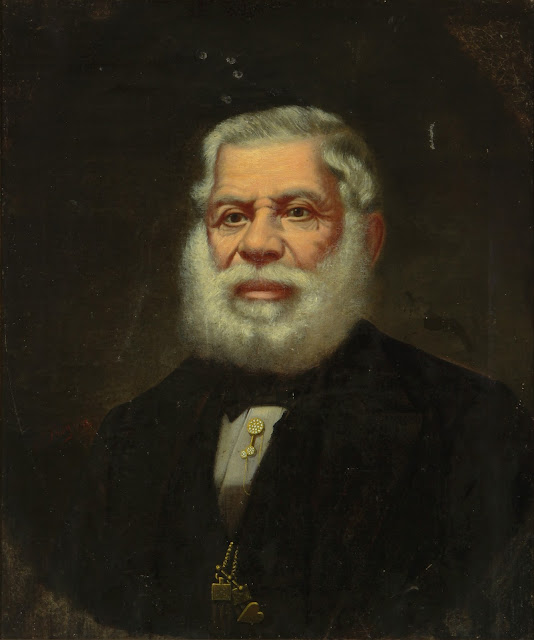
Pío Pico at the age of 67 in 1868.

John Bidwell, an early California settler, mentioned Pico among the people he knew:

Los Angeles I first saw in March 1845. It then had probably 250 people, of whom I recall Don Abel Stearns, John Temple, Captain Alexander Bell, William Wolfskill, Lemuel Carpenter, David W. Alexander; also of Mexicans, Pio Pico (governor), Don Juan Bandini, and others.

By the 1850s Pico was one of the richest men in Alta California. In 1850 he purchased the 8,894-acre (3,599 ha) Rancho Paso de Bartolo, which included half of present-day Whittier. Two years later, he built a home on the ranch and lived there until 1892. It is preserved today as Pio Pico State Historic Park. Pico also owned the former Mission San Fernando Rey de España, Rancho Santa Margarita y Las Flores (now part of Camp Pendleton), and several other ranchos for a total of over 500,000 acres (200,000 ha).

In 1868, he constructed the three-story, 33-room hotel, Pico House (Casa de Pico) on the old plaza of Los Angeles, opposite today's Olvera Street. At the time of its opening in 1869, it was the most lavish hotel in Southern California. Even before 1900, however, both the hotel and the surrounding neighborhood had begun to decline, as the business center moved farther south. After decades as a shabby flophouse, the hotel was deeded to the State of California in 1953. It is now a part of El Pueblo de Los Angeles State Historic Monument. It is used on occasion for exhibits and special events.

== Later life ==
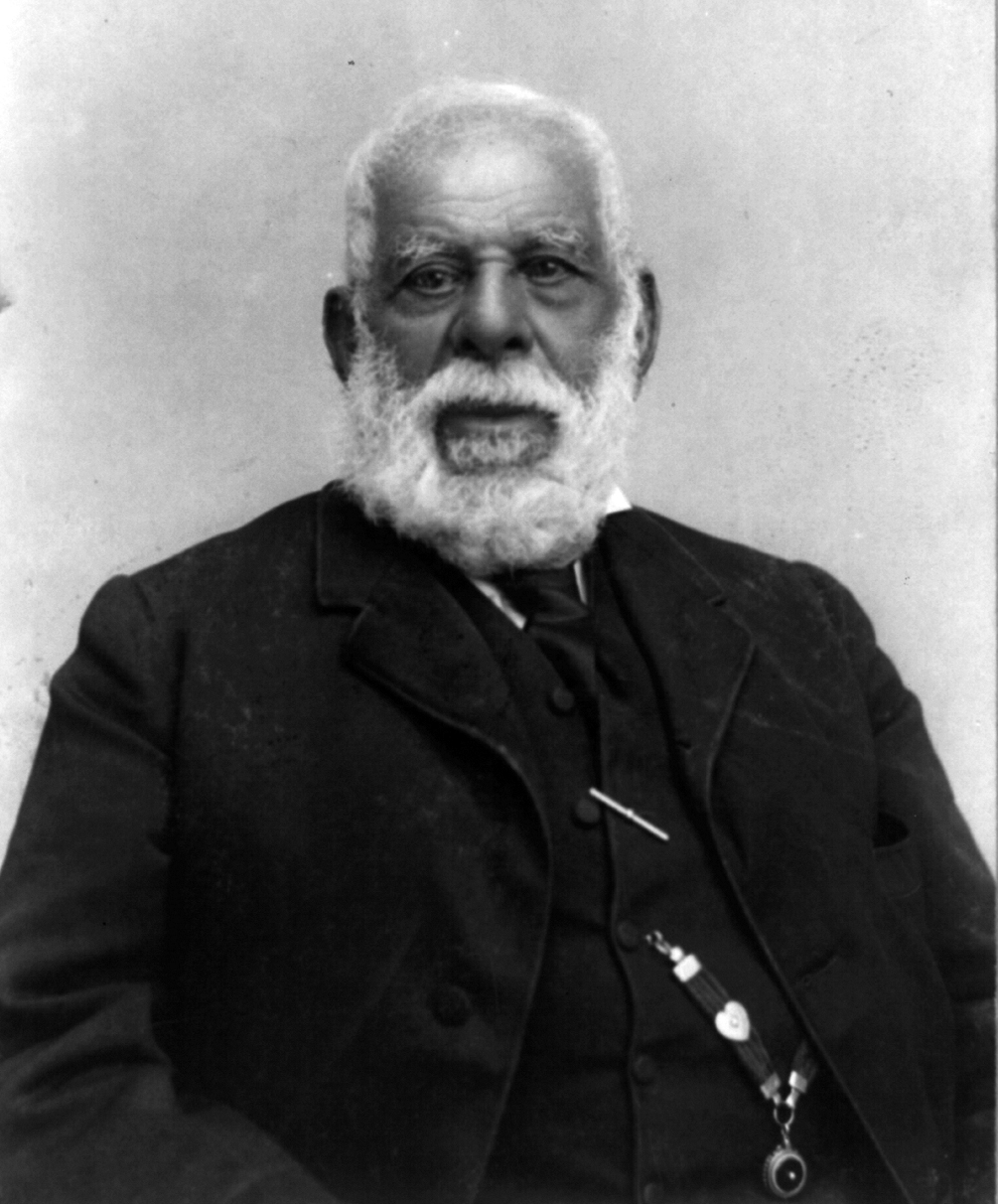
Pío de Jesús Pico later in life

Following the American annexation of California, Pico dedicated himself to his businesses.

He survived the American conquest of California, becoming one of the wealthiest California cattlemen, controlling more than 250,000 acres (100,000 ha). He defended his position and fortune in over 100 legal cases, including 20 that were argued before the California Supreme Court.

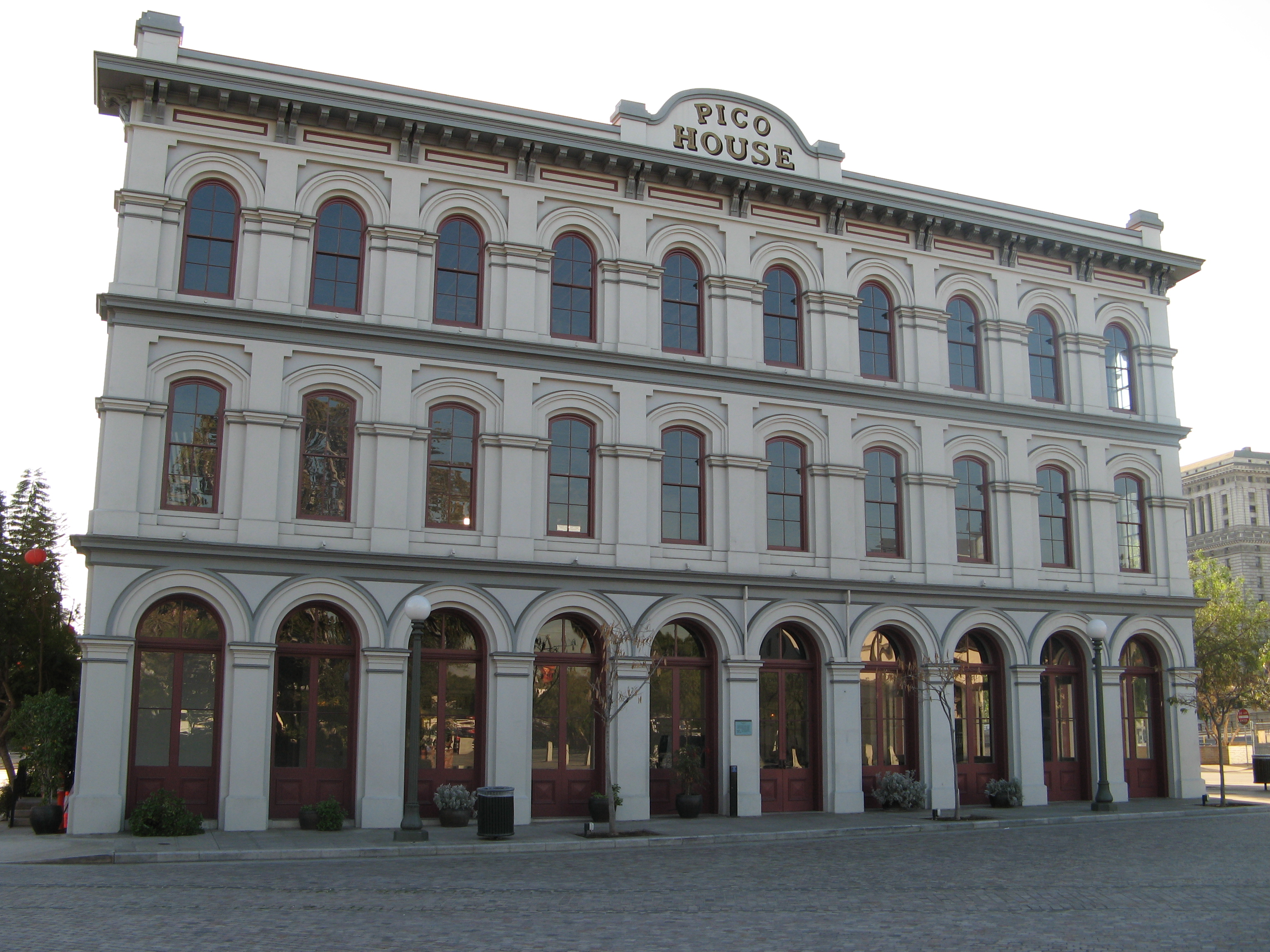
Pico House, located on the Plaza de Los Ángeles.

However, gambling, losses to loan sharks, bad business practices, being a victim of fraud, and the flood of 1883 ruined him financially. For example, in 1893, Pico made an arrangement with Bernard Cohn in which Cohn paid Pico more than $60,000 in exchange for a deed to Pico's property in Los Angeles and elsewhere in the county. Pico sued Cohn, but lost on appeal. The decision, Pico v. Cohn (1891) 91 Cal. 129, 133-134, is classically cited by California appellate courts in cases having to do with the setting aside of a judgment in case of fraud.

Pico was forced to liquidate his real estate holdings and his final years were spent in near poverty. In 1893, a committee of local boosters and history enthusiasts asked him to appear at the Chicago World's Columbian Exposition as "the last of the California "dons". Pico refused, considering it an affront to his dignity. He died in 1894 at the home of his daughter, Joaquina Pico Moreno, in Los Angeles. He was buried in the old Calvary Cemetery on North Broadway in Downtown Los Angeles, but his remains, as well as those of his wife, were relocated in 1921 to a modest tomb in El Campo Santo Cemetery, now in the Homestead Museum in the City of Industry.

== Personal life ==
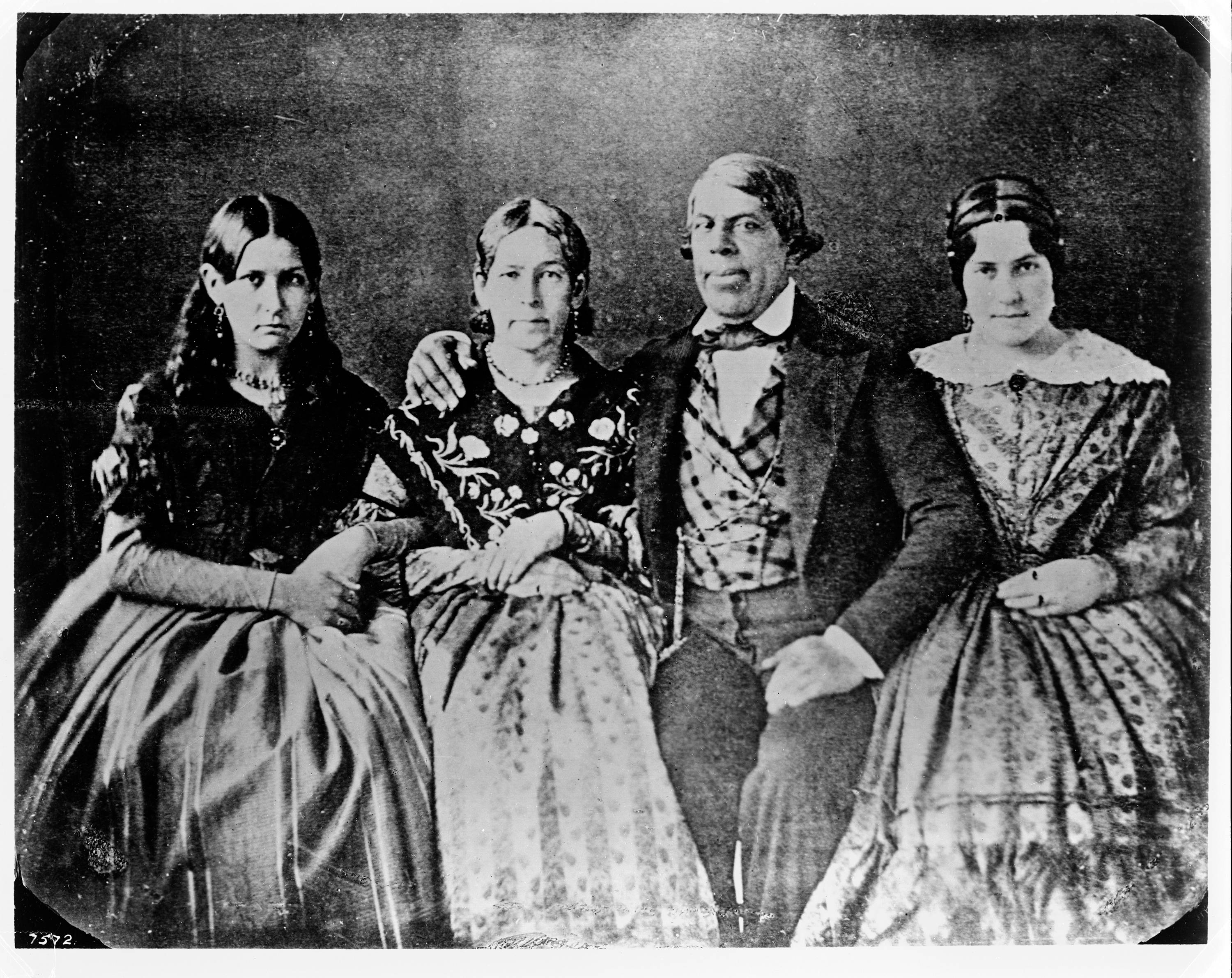
Don Pio Pico, his wife Maria Ignacia Alvarado, and two nieces, Maraneto Alvarado and Trinidad de la Guerra

Pico's wife María Ignacia Alvarado died on February 21, 1854, in Santa Barbara. Pico never acknowledged any children with her or anyone else, but multiple people claimed to have been his direct descendants. The mixed martial artist Aaron Pico is reportedly Pío Pico's great-great-great-great grandson.

Pico, a Spanish speaker, never learned English, which would become an important factor in his lawsuit against Juan Forster.

Pico held three different nationalities during his lifetime. He was born a Spaniard in New Spain, became a Mexican citizen as a young man, and finally a United States citizen. He was known for his extravagant lifestyle, with fine clothes, expensive furnishings, and heavy gambling.

In 2010, scientists published an article about Pio Pico asserting that he showed signs of acromegaly, a disease not characterized until later in the nineteenth century.

== Legacy ==
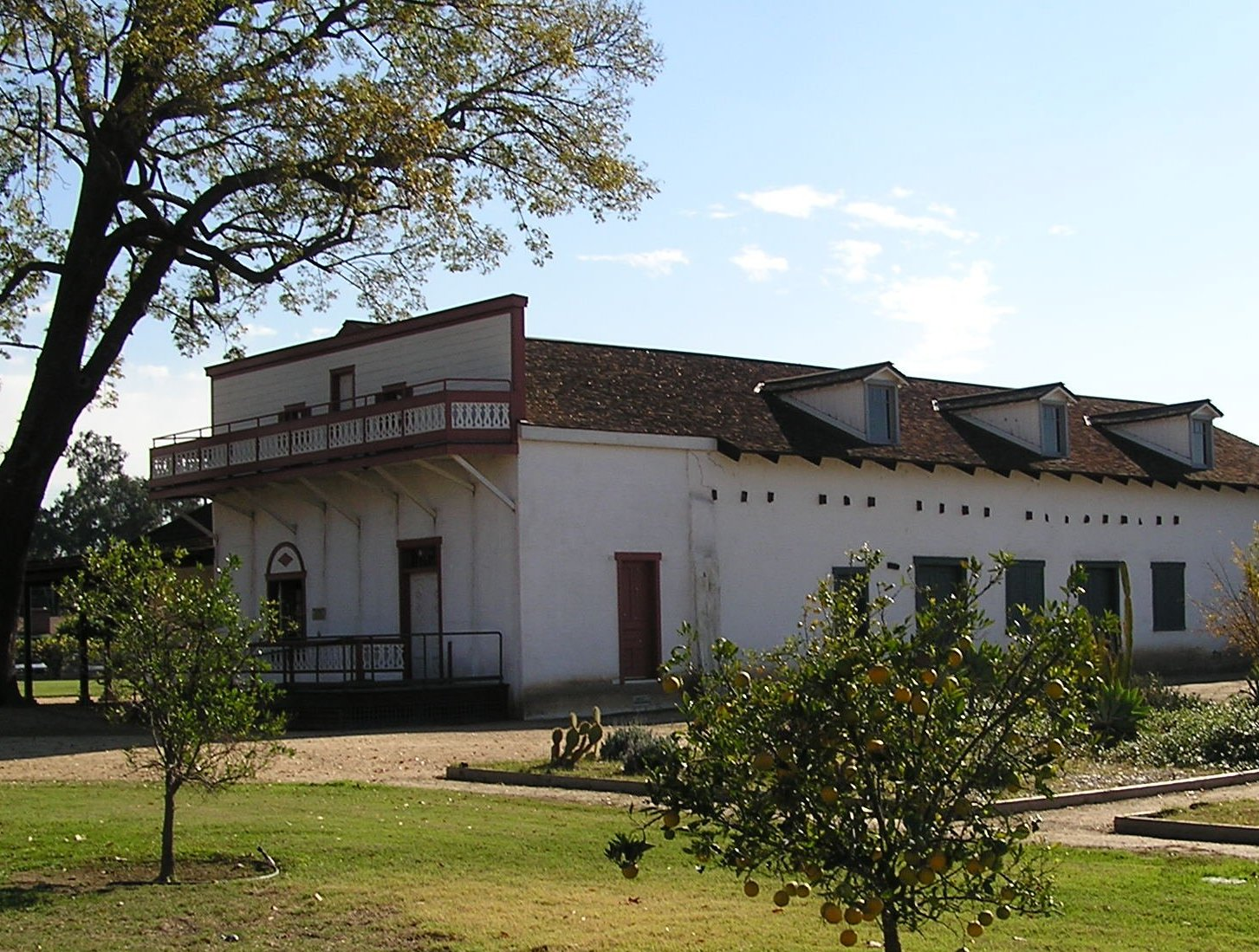
Pío Pico State Historic Park

Numerous landmarks, areas, and streets bear Pico's name, especially in Southern California and particularly Los Angeles County. Pico Boulevard, a major east–west thoroughfare in Los Angeles, is named for him. The L.A. neighborhoods of Pico Union, Pico-Roberston, Pico Park, Pico/Rimpau, and Pico/Aliso Gardens bear his name. The city of Pico Rivera is also named after him. Pico station and Pico/Aliso station are stops on the Los Angeles Metro Rail. The 300-megawatt Pio Pico Energy Center has natural gas-fired combustion turbine generators in Otay Mesa, San Diego, starting in 2016.

Pío Pico State Historic Park is the historic site of Governor Pico's Rancho Paso de Bartolo, made up of his adobe mansion and ranching estate. The site, located in Whittier, California, was opened to the public in 1927 and is operated by California State Parks.

Pico House, located on the Los Angeles Plaza, is a historic site in Downtown Los Angeles, now part of the El Pueblo de Los Ángeles Historical Monument.
