= California revolt of 1836 =

1836 political and military uprising in Mexican Alta California

California revolt (1836)
Date	November 3–29, 1836
Location	Monterey, Alta California, Mexico
Result	Revolutionary victory: Overthrow of Governor Nicolás Gutiérrez; Juan Bautista Alvarado became the dominant political leader; Alta California remained under Mexican sovereignty after a subsequent political settlement

Belligerents
Californio federalists	Mexico: Alta California

Commanders and leaders
Juan Alvarado; José Castro; Mariano Guadalupe; Isaac Graham	Nicolás Gutiérrez

Strength
Approximately 100 men at Monterey	Unknown

Casualties and losses
Unknown	Unknown
- The military confrontation was brief; the larger conflict was political and constitutional.

The California Revolution of 1836, also known as the California Revolt of 1836, the Alvarado Revolution, or the Monterey Revolt, was a political and military uprising in Alta California, then a Mexican territory, against the territorial government headed by Governor Nicolás Gutiérrez. The revolt took place primarily in November 1836 and was led by prominent Californios including Juan Bautista Alvarado, José Castro, and Mariano Guadalupe Vallejo.

== Background ==
=== Alta California under Mexico ===
Alta California became part of independent Mexico following the collapse of Spanish colonial rule in 1821. During the Mexican period, California remained geographically distant from Mexico City and possessed a relatively small population spread among settlements, ranchos, missions, presidios, and Indigenous communities.

The Mexican Constitution of 1824 established a federal political system. Alta California, however, was organized as a territory rather than a full state. This distinction was politically significant because territories were subject to greater federal control than Mexican states. The governor was appointed by the national government, while local Californians participated in municipal institutions and the territorial Diputación.

=== Federalism, centralism, and regional politics ===
Mexican politics during the 1830s were divided between federalists and centralists. Federalists supported the constitutional arrangement established in 1824 and favored greater political authority for regional and local institutions. Centralists sought to strengthen the national government and reduce regional political autonomy.

The political transformation eventually resulted in the adoption of the Seven Constitutional Laws and the establishment of a centralized political system. For many Californios, the movement toward centralism threatened the authority of local institutions. The great distance between California and Mexico City also made local political autonomy particularly important.

The revolution of 1836 was therefore part of a broader Mexican constitutional crisis rather than an isolated Californian event. Political resistance and regional revolts had already occurred in Mexican California, demonstrating that Californios possessed their own political institutions and traditions of resistance.

== The Revolt of 1836 ==
=== Political crisis and preparations ===
The immediate crisis developed during the administration of Governor Nicolás Gutiérrez. His government came into conflict with members of the Diputación and Californio political leaders. Disagreements concerning political authority, local administration, and the increasing influence of the central government contributed to growing opposition.

After the dissolution of the Diputación, opposition leaders gathered near the former mission at San Juan Bautista. Political discussions gradually developed into preparations for armed resistance. Antonio Buelna was among those associated with the movement and its defense of constitutional rights and federalism.

The revolutionary movement presented itself primarily as a defense of the Mexican constitutional order. The rebels argued that the Constitution of 1824 had established a federal system and that the centralist transformation of Mexico had violated that political arrangement.

=== Isaac Graham and foreign participation ===
Isaac Graham was an American adventurer and resident of California. Graham and a group of foreign volunteers and riflemen participated in the revolutionary campaign, providing additional manpower and military experience.

The participation of American residents later contributed to claims that the revolt had been an American-backed movement. The events also occurred during a period in which the Texas Revolution and American interest in California increased concerns about foreign influence in Mexican territory.

However, the political objectives of the revolt were formulated mainly by Californio leaders, including Juan Bautista Alvarado, José Castro, Antonio Buelna, and other members of the local political elite. Foreign participation was important to the military movement but did not represent the entire political purpose of the revolt.

=== The march on Monterey ===
In early November 1836, Alvarado and Castro began their movement toward Monterey, the political capital of Alta California and the center of the territorial government.

The revolutionary forces sought control of Monterey rather than a prolonged campaign throughout the entire territory. After reaching the capital, the rebels surrounded the government forces and pressured Governor Gutiérrez to surrender.

The fall of Gutiérrez represented the immediate military success of the revolution. It demonstrated the weakness of the territorial government and the ability of a relatively small political and military coalition to overthrow an administration that had lost significant local support.

== Political Reorganization and the Struggle for Control ==
=== The Monterey Plan ===
Following the capture of Monterey, the revolutionary leadership moved quickly from military action toward political organization. The Diputación became one of the central institutions of the new political order.

On November 7, 1836, members of the Diputación adopted a proclamation commonly known as the Monterey Plan or the Manifiesto de la Alta California. The document was associated with José Castro, Juan Bautista Alvarado, Antonio Buelna, and José Antonio Noriega and was adopted during the political crisis following the revolt in Monterey.

The proclamation declared that Alta California would separate from Mexico until the federal system established in 1824 was restored. It also described California as a free and sovereign political community and called for the reorganization of political authority.

The wording created a form of conditional independence. California was to exercise political autonomy while Mexico remained under a centralist system, but the possibility of reintegration into a restored federal Mexico remained open.

=== Sovereignty and federalism ===
The revolutionary movement created an important political contradiction. Alta California claimed the authority to organize its own government and described itself as free and sovereign, while many revolutionaries continued to connect their political cause with Mexican federalism rather than permanent separation from the Mexican nation.

This political language was connected to the wider Mexican tradition of the pronunciamiento, in which political and military groups challenged an existing government while claiming to defend constitutional or political principles.

The revolt was therefore different from movements whose principal objective was permanent national independence. Its political goals combined regional autonomy, constitutional federalism, and opposition to the centralist government.

=== Mariano Guadalupe Vallejo ===
Mariano Guadalupe Vallejo was one of the most important military and political figures associated with the new political order. He commanded military forces in northern California and possessed considerable influence among Californio communities.

Although Alvarado and Castro led the movement that captured Monterey, Vallejo's support was important to the consolidation of the revolution. His association with the new political order strengthened the military position of the revolutionary leadership.

=== Southern opposition ===
The Monterey revolution did not receive unanimous support throughout Alta California. Political leaders in southern communities, particularly around Los Angeles, Santa Barbara, and San Diego, expressed reservations about the new political order.

Southern opposition was influenced by regional, local, and political differences. Some leaders rejected the Monterey Plan because they had not participated in its adoption. Others opposed the idea of separation from Mexico even while supporting federalism and opposing centralism.

These disagreements demonstrated that the conflict was not simply between supporters and opponents of Mexican rule. Californios themselves had different interpretations of federalism, regional authority, political legitimacy, and the future relationship between California and Mexico.

=== The southern campaign and negotiations ===
After establishing control over Monterey, Alvarado sought recognition from southern communities. His movement south combined political negotiations with military pressure.

The conflict did not immediately become a large-scale civil war. Negotiations and political compromises played an important role in limiting violence and reducing the possibility of a prolonged conflict.

The southern campaign nevertheless demonstrated that the revolution had created a second political struggle within California concerning who had the authority to represent the territory. Regional divisions between northern and southern political groups remained an important issue after the fall of Gutiérrez.

== Mexico's Response and the Settlement ==
=== Mexico's political crisis ===
Alta California remained legally connected to Mexico, making a military or political response from the national government possible. However, Mexico was experiencing severe political instability during 1836.

The central government was dealing with the transition from federalism to centralism, regional rebellions, and the Texas Revolution. The capture of Antonio López de Santa Anna after the Battle of San Jacinto further complicated the national political situation.

Mexico's internal crisis and the great distance separating California from the political center limited the government's immediate ability to impose direct control over the territory. This situation gave Alvarado and his allies time to consolidate their political position.

=== Political settlement ===
The revolutionary leadership ultimately reached a political accommodation with the Mexican government. Rather than maintaining permanent independence, California remained within Mexico while Californio leaders gained greater influence over territorial political affairs.

Juan Bautista Alvarado became governor of Alta California in 1837. His rise represented a compromise between Californio demands for greater political influence and the Mexican government's continuing claim to sovereignty over the territory.

The settlement did not eliminate political conflict. Opposition continued in different parts of California, and Alvarado's administration faced additional challenges. Nevertheless, the revolution had changed the balance of political power by demonstrating the ability of Californio leaders to challenge and replace governments imposed from outside the territory.

== Consequences and Historical Significance ==
=== Political consequences ===
The revolution had several important political consequences:

- Nicolás Gutiérrez was removed from power.
- The Diputación became central to the new political order.
- Juan Bautista Alvarado emerged as the dominant political figure in Alta California.
- José Castro gained an important military and political role.
- Mariano Guadalupe Vallejo became a major military figure.
- Californio political autonomy increased.
- Northern and southern political divisions became more visible.
- Mexico's difficulty in directly controlling distant California became apparent.
- Foreign participation in Californian politics became increasingly controversial.

=== Historical significance ===
The California Revolution of 1836 is significant because it demonstrates that important political conflicts existed in Mexican California independently of the later American conquest. Californios possessed political institutions, regional interests, military networks, and competing ideas about the relationship between California and Mexico.

The revolt also demonstrates the importance of the Mexican struggle between federalism and centralism. Its leaders were not simply attempting to establish a foreign-backed republic. They were participating in a wider Mexican political crisis and defending a particular interpretation of constitutional government, regional autonomy, and political legitimacy.

=== Legacy ===
The political legacy of the revolt continued during the remaining Mexican period of California. Alvarado's governorship lasted from 1837 to 1842, and the revolution strengthened the political influence of Californio leaders.

At the same time, the movement exposed continuing divisions between northern and southern California. The political autonomy created by the revolt remained limited and temporary.

The Mexican–American War later transformed California's political status. Under the Treaty of Guadalupe Hidalgo in 1848, Alta California became part of the United States.
