= Revolts against the Centralist Republic of Mexico =

Federalist pronunciamientos and regional revolts in Mexico, 1835–1846

Date	1835–1846
Location	Mexico (including modern-day Texas, California and New Mexico in the United States)
Result	Most federalist risings suppressed or bargained down; de facto Texas independence in 1836; Yucatán intermittently separate; reincorporated 1848; restoration of the United Mexican States under the federalist Constitution of 1824

Belligerents
Mexican Republic	Federalist movement Zacatecas; Alta California; Tabasco; Frontera del Norte (Note: Contemporary Anglo-American sources called the northeastern movement the Republic of the Rio Grande and framed them as secessionist. The belligerents never used that name and did not speak of secession. Their own papers headed their leader Jesús Cárdenas as the president of the provisional government of the northern frontier of the Mexican Republic.)	Separatist polities Republic of Texas; Republic of Yucatán (intermittent)

Commanders and leaders
Antonio López de Santa Anna; Anastasio Bustamante; Miguel Barragán; Mariano Paredes y Arrillaga; Manuel Armijo; Mariano Arista; Gabriel Valencia	Valentín Gómez Farías; José de Urrea; José Mariano Salas; Francisco García Salinas; Juan Bautista Alvarado; Antonio Canales Rosillo	Sam Houston; Santiago Méndez; Miguel Barbachano

The revolts against the Centralist Republic of Mexico were a cycle of pronunciamientos, regional wars and, in a minority of cases, secessionist movements that followed the replacement of the federal Constitution of 1824 by a unitary regime in 1835–1836. Most of the movements demanded the restoration of the 1824 charter, local autonomy and an end to appointed departmental governors. A smaller number used the language of independence as leverage, and only Texas and, intermittently, Yucatán became separate polities in practice.

The regime created by the Siete Leyes and later recast in the Bases Orgánicas collapsed when a federalist pronunciamiento in the capital, the Plan de la Ciudadela of 4 August 1846, restored the Constitution of 1824 on 22 August, in the first year of the Mexican–American War.

== Constitutional crisis, 1835–1836 ==
The First Federal Republic left the national government weak, the states armed, and fiscal transfers in dispute. After the radical administration of Valentín Gómez Farías attacked ecclesiastical privilege and the regular army, a coalition of hombres de bien, the regular officer corps and much of Congress abandoned the 1824 settlement. On 23 October 1835 Congress approved the Bases para la Reorganización de la Nación Mexicana, which ended the federal system in principle. The Siete Leyes, promulgated on 30 December 1836, replaced sovereign states with departments whose governors were appointed from the centre, restricted suffrage, and created a fourth power, the Supremo Poder Conservador.

Historian Reynaldo Sordo Cedeño argues against the view that Antonio López de Santa Anna ochestrated the shift to centralism. A minority of legislators built the centralist majority, and neither the Church nor the army was a decisive author of the Siete Leyes, promulgated by José Justo Corro on 30 December 1836. Santa Anna's part in 1835 was the defeat of Zacatecas and the march on Texas.

== Zacatecas, 1835 ==
Zacatecas was the first state to fight the new order. Its civic militia and silver revenues had made it a pillar of the 1824 settlement and an ally of Santa Anna against Anastasio Bustamante in 1832. When the new government ordered the dissolution of state militias, Governor Francisco García Salinas raised about four thousand men. Santa Anna left the presidency with Miguel Barragán and defeated García Salinas at the Battle of Zacatecas. As punishment, Aguascalientes was detached from Zacatecas on 23 May 1835 and made a separate territory. The army sacked the city and hauled silver from the Fresnillo mines. Historian Will Fowler notes that Santa Anna expected former allies to follow him even when he changed sides after the Plan of Cuernavaca.

== Texas: from federalist revolt to a separate republic ==
The Texas Revolution began inside a Mexican constitutional quarrel and ended outside it. Coahuila and Texas were a single federal state. Anglo colonists, Tejano landowners and Mexican liberals all had grievances against the shift to departments, the Law of 6 April 1830 and the attack on the civic militia; slavery was a further and decisive wedge for many colonists from the southern United States.

The Consultation that met at San Felipe in November 1835 did not at first declare independence. Its Declaration of the People of Texas, stated that they had taken up arms "in defence of the republican principles of the federal constitution of Mexico, of eighteen and twenty-four," offered aid to other members of the "Mexican confederacy," and reserved the right to withdraw only while the federal system remained overthrown. Lorenzo de Zavala, a Mexican liberal and former cabinet minister, sat in that coalition. Tejano federalists such as Juan Seguín raised forces initially in favor of federalist governor Agustín Viesca. The slide from restoration of 1824 and separate statehood toward a standalone Anglo-dominated republic was complete only with the Convention of 1836 and the Declaration of Independence of 2 March.

Military events that followed were Gonzales, the siege of Béxar, the fall of the Alamo, José de Urrea's undefeated coastal campaign, San Jacinto and the Treaties of Velasco, which the government of José Justo Corro repudiated because Santa Anna, a prisoner, had no authority to alienate national territory. Texas remained a de facto republic until annexation by the United States in 1845.

== Alta California: plan of Monterey, 1836 ==
After Mariano Chico and Nicolás Gutiérrez tried to enforce the Siete Leyes, Juan Bautista Alvarado and José Castro deposed Gutiérrez at Monterey. On 7 November 1836 the diputación adopted the Plan of Monterey. Article 1 declared Alta California would be independent of Mexico if it did not restore the federal system of 1824. Article 2 erected it as an estado libre y soberano, the 1824 title of a federal state, and made the sitting diputación a constituent body.

Los Angeles and San Diego rejected a Monterey-run state. On 9 July 1837, at Santa Bárbara, Alvarado swore the Siete Leyes and issued as interim governor of the Department of Alta California. Mexico City, still unaware of that oath, had named Carlos Antonio Carrillo provisional governor on 6 June; the commission arrived in October, and Carrillo took the oath at Los Angeles on 6 December. The south and north clashed at San Buenaventura and Las Flores. A 20 July 1838 order left Alvarado, as senior vocal, acting governor; Carrillo relinquished. Alvarado held the department until 1842.

== New Mexico: the Río Arriba revolt, 1837 ==
The 1837 rising in Santa Fe de Nuevo México was a Hispano–Pueblo popular revolt against Governor Albino Pérez, departmental taxes and customs practice on the Santa Fe Trail. Pérez was killed on 8 August 1837 and his head displayed in Santa Fe. A junta in the north raised José María González of Chimayó. Talk that González might invite foreign help, including annexation by the United States, weakened him inside the movement.

Pablo Montoya displaced González. In the Río Abajo, former governor Manuel Armijo issued the Plan of Tomé, occupied Santa Fe and obtained recognition from Mexico City. After a negotiated pause the revolt flared again; with Veracruz dragoons under Lt. Col. Cayetano Justiniani, Armijo defeated González near Pojoaque in January 1838 and had him executed at Santa Cruz.

== Urrea, the northeast and the 1840 palace siege ==
The most serious interior federalist war of the late 1830s was led by José de Urrea, the same general who had won every engagement in Texas for Mexico. In December 1837 he rose in Sonora for the 1824 Constitution, crossed into Sinaloa, was checked, and later reappeared at Tampico. On 22 January 1839 he declared the centre's contracts void in the name of the federal government.

With José Antonio Mexía he tried to open a road toward the capital. On 3 May 1839 Gabriel Valencia defeated them at Acajete, near Puebla. Mexía was captured and shot; Urrea, wounded, reached Tampico, which fell to Mariano Arista following a siege in June.

On 15 July 1840 federalists broke him out of custody in Mexico City. Alongside Gómez Farías, he seized the National Palace and held President Bustamante for twelve days of street fighting, before an amnesty ended the episode.

== Tabasco, 1839–1842 and 1846 ==
Tabasco's federalist risings were followed by commercial retaliation. From 1839 Fernando Nicolás Maldonado, Juan Pablo Anaya and others fought the centralist governor José Ignacio Gutiérrez. Yucatán sent help; two Texas vessels appeared in the river war. Gutiérrez capitulated at Atasta on 17 November 1840.

Bustamante then closed the port of San Juan Bautista to foreign and coastal trade. On 13 February 1841 the VIII Legislature decreed Tabasco's separation, in protest at the centralist regime and at Bustamante's closure of San Juan Bautista. The congress took the faculties of the general congress and vested presidential faculties in Governor José Víctor Jiménez. It rejected a proposal to form a lasting independent republic with Yucatán, and Tabasco re-entered on 2 December 1842 after Santa Anna lifted the sanctions.

In November 1846, during the Mexican–American War, General Juan Bautista Traconis again declared separation after Mexico City failed to reinforce the Gulf coast. Santa Anna called him a traitor; local support collapsed; an acta of 8 December reversed the act, and reincorporation was formalised on 5 January 1847.

== Coahuila, Nuevo León and Tamaulipas: the "Río Grande Republic", 1838–1840 ==
Federalist opposition on the northeast began in 1838–39 among the villas del norte (Guerrero, Mier, Camargo, Reynosa, Laredo), tied to Urrea's Tampico revolt and to Antonio Canales Rosillo. After a brief submission, Canales called a meeting of town commissioners at Laredo in January 1840. The articles adopted at Casa Blanca on 23 January refused the Mexico City government, set up the "provisional government of the northern frontier" with a president and a council of five, and called a convention of all the states of the republic for 28 May. Jesús Cárdenas was named political chief. The Correo del Río Bravo del Norte of 16 February headed him President of the Northern Frontier of the Mexican Republic.

Mariano Arista broke the field force at Morales. Antonio Zapata, Canales' second was taken and shot. Cárdenas and the council crossed to Victoria, Texas; Canales recruited there and returned. Town after town on the Mexican bank submitted. Canales accepted amnesty in November, the government assumed the debts of the provisional government, and he later served under Arista.

The Houston Morning Star of 3 March 1840 reported a convention at Laredo that had "declared the independence from Mexico" and organized a "provisional government for the Republic of Rio Grande." Hubert Howe Bancroft accepted that report, and later Texas accounts repeat the name. The Casa Blanca articles, the Correo, and the November submission do not use it, and do not speak of secession; they use frontera del norte, villas del norte and gobierno provisional.

== Yucatán, 1839–1848 ==
Yucatán had entered the federation in 1823–1825 under a special pact and its own state constitution. When that pact was replaced by departments, Yucatecan elites argued that the bond with Mexico was dissolved. Revolt began at Tizimín on 29 May 1839. On 4 March 1840 the Congress of Yucatán decreed that the peninsula would remain separate until Mexico was again governed as a federation. A new Yucatecan constitution established freedom of worship, freedom of the press and an early form of amparo. The Act of Independence of the Peninsula followed on 1 October 1841.

Santa Anna sent Andrés Quintana Roo to negotiate. The resulting articles were favorable to Yucatán and were then rejected in Mexico City. A military expedition failed; a trade blockade succeeded in forcing new treaties under which Yucatán governed itself while returning to the national orbit. President José Joaquín de Herrera set those treaties aside in 1845. After federalism was restored in 1846, Yucatán voted to rejoin, then split again because of the Mexican–American War. The Caste War that opened on 30 July 1847 forced Mérida back to Mexico City; reincorporation was agreed on 17 August 1848.

== Interior crisis, 1841–1845 ==
Federalism was not confined to the periphery. The 1841 "triangular" revolt (Jalisco, and allied garrisons) overthrew Bustamante and produced the Bases de Tacubaya. The Congress elected in 1842 proved too federalist for Santa Anna, who dissolved it. A Junta of Notables then wrote the Bases Orgánicas, a second centralist constitution. Mariano Paredes y Arrillaga rose at Guadalajara in December 1844 against Santa Anna, and again at San Luis Potosí on 14 December 1845 against President José Joaquín de Herrera. He took the executive in January 1846. His government was read by federalists as a conservative-monarchist experiment on the eve of war with the United States.

== 1846: the revolt that ended the Centralist Republic ==
On 4 August 1846 General José Mariano Salas, in concert with Gómez Farías and the puro federalists, pronounced the Plan de la Ciudadela against the Paredes government, denounced rumors of a foreign throne, called Santa Anna back and demanded a popular congress on the 1824 electoral law. Paredes fell. On 22 August 1846 Salas decreed that, until a new constitution appeared, the Constitution of 1824 would again govern, departmental assemblies would cease, and governors would style themselves governors of states.

That decree is the terminal date of the Centralist Republic and the founding act of the Second Federal Republic of Mexico. The subsequent Revolt of the Polkos was a conservative-clerical rising against Gómez Farías's wartime anticlerical finance, not a centralist restoration.

== See also ==
- First Mexican Republic
- Centralist Republic of Mexico
- Second Federal Republic of Mexico
- Pronunciamiento
- Plans in Mexican history
- Revolt of the Polkos
- Mexican–American War
