= Battle of San Buenaventura =

1838 battle in Alta California, Mexico

Coordinates: 34.2809°N 119.2980°W

- Part of the revolts against the Centralist Republic of Mexico
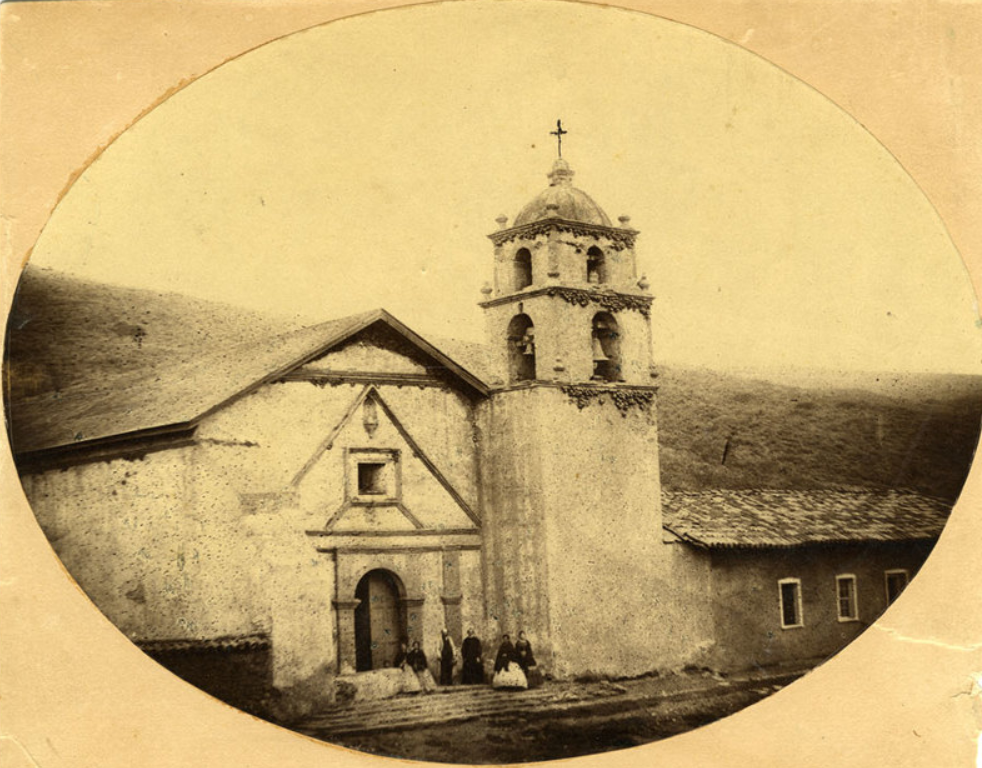
- Mission San Buenaventura, one location of the battle, as seen c. 1866
Date	March 27–28, 1838
Location	Modern-day Ventura County, California; then part of Alta California, Mexico
Result	Norteño victory

Belligerents
Norteños	Sureños

Commanders and leaders
Juan Bautista Alvarado; José Castro	Carlos Antonio Carrillo; Juan Castañeda (POW)

Strength
~100	~100

Casualties and losses
1 killed	70 captured

The Battle of San Buenaventura was fought on March 27 and 28, 1838 in modern-day Ventura County, California, between supporters of competing claimants to the governorship of Alta California, a Mexican territory. Supporters of Juan Bautista Alvarado based in Northern California fought those of Carlos Antonio Carrillo from Southern California.

The major action consisted of a cannon siege on the Carrillo loyalists who were encamped at the Mission San Buenaventura in Ventura. The Alvarado forces won the battle, as the Carrillo forces fled from the mission under cover of darkness following the first day of the battle. Most of the Carillo forces were captured the following day at Saticoy. One person was killed in the battle, an Alvarado loyalist who was shot by a rifleman stationed in the mission's bell tower.

== Prelude to battle ==
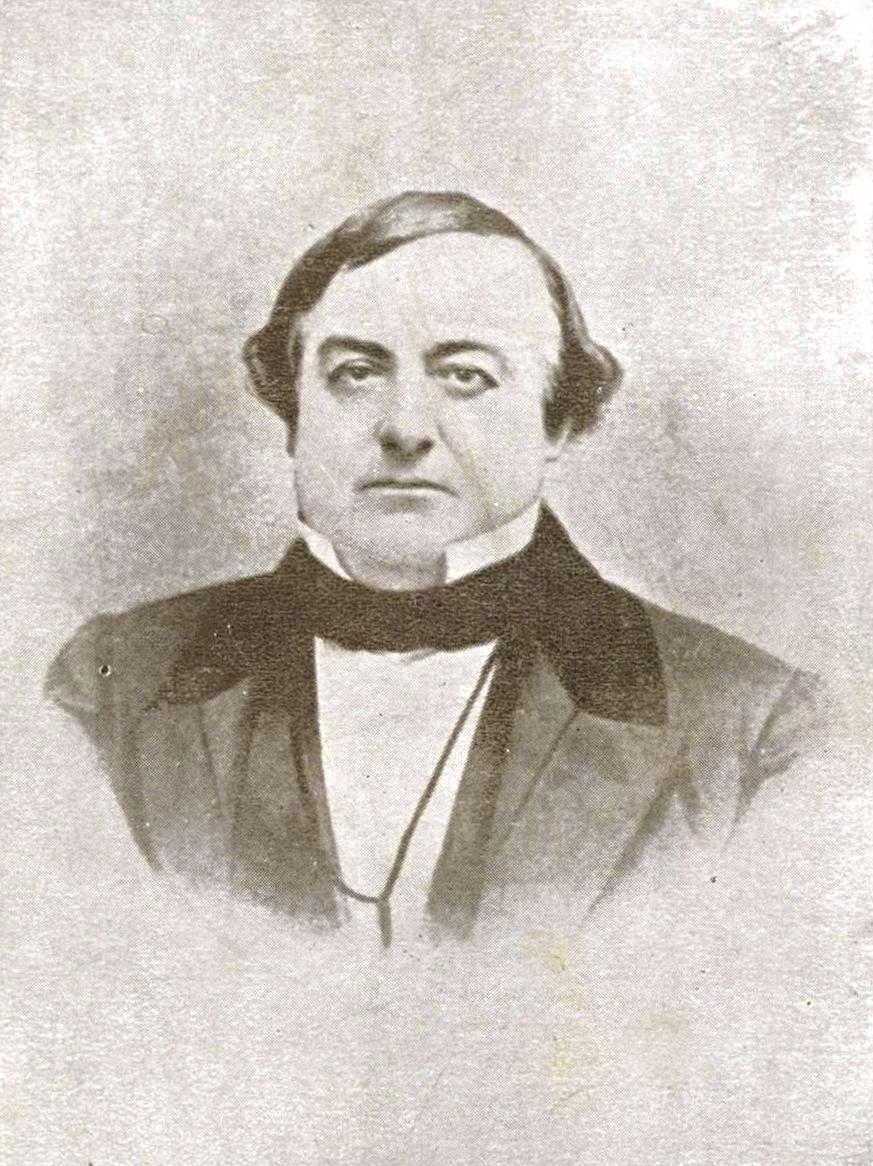
Juan Bautista Alvarado

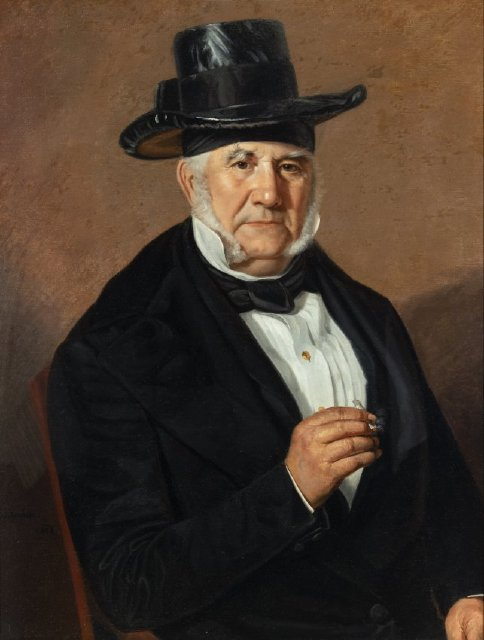
Carlos Antonio Carrillo

The battle was fought during the 25-year period (1821-1846) when the modern State of California was a Mexican territory.

Juan Bautista Alvarado was a native Californian who led a movement for the independence of California from 1836 to 1837. He negotiated an agreement with the Mexican government that provided for an end to the independence movement and his recognition as the Governor of Alta California. During the independence struggle led by Alvarado, the Mexican government appointed Carlos Antonio Carrillo, another native Californian and owner of the 8,881-acre Rancho Sespe in Ventura County, as the provisional governor. A schism developed over which of the men was the legitimate governor. The schism widened when Carrillo announced that he was moving the territorial capital to Los Angeles and also moving the custom house from Monterey to San Diego. The border line of the schism was between Santa Barbara and points north which aligned with Alvarado and Ventura and points south which aligned with Carrillo.

In December 1837, a formal ceremony was held in Los Angeles inaugurating Carrillo as governor. On January 3, 1838, Carrillo issued a proclamation declaring the ports of Monterey and San Francisco closed until such time as the north submitted to the new government in Los Angeles. Carrillo also sent his brother to Mexico seeking 200 soldiers to aid in establishing his authority. During January and February 1838, Alvarado and Carrillo exchanged letters seeking to avoid armed conflict.

In early March, Carrillo received an inaccurate report that Alvarado had sent an army south. To halt any invasion from the north, Carrillo sent an armed force to San Buenaventura under the command of Captain Juan Castañeda. Castañeda arrived in San Buenaventura on approximately March 12 and was then ordered to attack Santa Barbara before it could be reinforced from the north. Castañeda advanced with over 100 men to a location within sight of the Presidio of Santa Barbara. The commander of the Presidio refused to surrender, and Castañeda disobeyed the order to attack and instead retreated back to San Buenaventura.

On learning that Carrillo had sent an armed force to San Buenaventura, Alvarado decided to launch a surprise attack on Carrillo’s forces. Alvarado gathered soldiers from the north and placed them under the command of General José Castro. Castro and his soldiers then marched south where they united with the forces already stationed at the Santa Barbara Presidio.

== Battle ==
=== The unguarded Rincon ===
Castro’s force, totaling approximately 100 men and equipped with three cannons, advanced south from Santa Barbara. To reach San Buenaventura, Castro had to advance through the Rincon Pass, a narrow route between the mountains and the sea that became unpassable at high tide. In his account of the battle, local historian Richard Senate wrote that the Californians of that era believed that "whoever held the Rincon Pass could hold it successfully against any enemy." To Castro's surprise, the Rincon was "unguarded, not even a sentinel being stationed there." Accordingly, Castro was able to advance through the Rincon both unopposed and undetected.

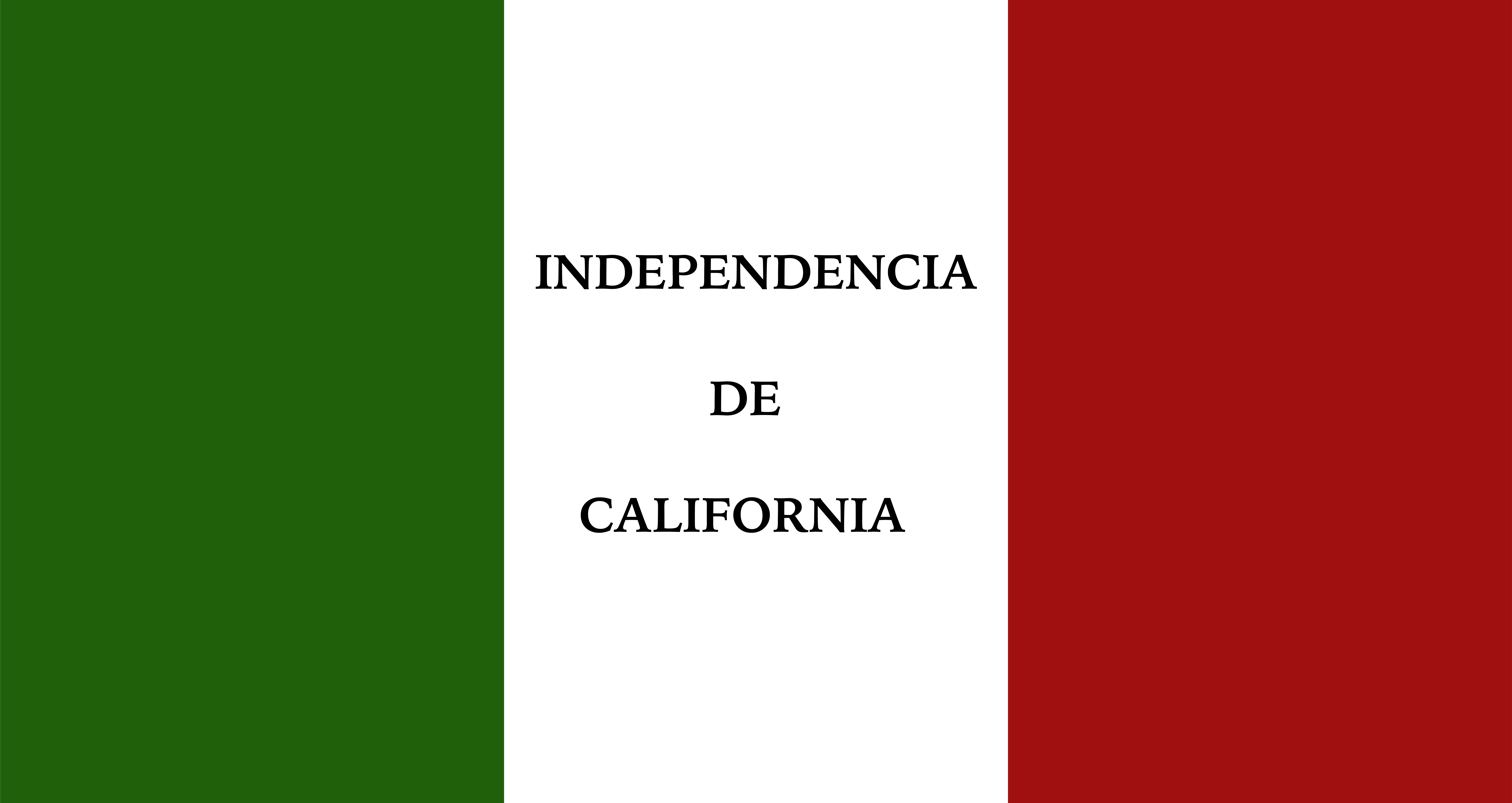
The flag carried by Alvarado's men

=== "Do as you please" ===
Castro's forces arrived in San Buenaventura and surrounded the Mission, catching Castañeda's forces by surprise. On the morning of March 27, Castro sent a note to Castañeda, giving him one hour to evacuate the Mission in exchange for a promise to safeguard life and property. Castañeda replied that he would only comply if the evacuation were made "with all the honors of war." Castro declined to make the concession, and Castañeda refused to surrender. Castro sent a final note threatening to open fire at once, and Castañeda sent his response: "Do as you please."

=== The siege ===
Upon receiving Castañeda's final note, Castro ordered his forces to fire their cannons at the Mission. Castro placed two cannons on the shore-side of the Mission, and a third cannon opened fire from an elevation to the back of the mission. According to a 1926 account written by historian Sol N. Sheridan, Castro's forces seized and held a "small fort at the site of the Hill schoolhouse." (Note: There was no "fort" at the site of the old Hill schoolhouse. Sheridan's reference likely refers to an old adobe structure overlooking the Mission known as the "House of the Angel".) Castro also cut off the supply of water from the San Buenaventura Mission Aqueduct, leaving Castañeda's men to drink the mission's wine.

During the siege, the Mission's thick stone and adobe walls protected Castañeda’s forces, and there is no record of any losses among Castañeda's men. Early in the battle, one of Castro’s men, Aquilino Ramirez, was killed by a shot from a rifleman stationed in the Mission's church tower. Ramirez was a father of seven from Santa Barbara, and his death led his comrades-in-arms to direct a furious cannonade at the church.

Castro wrote to Alvarado following the battle, describing "two days of continuous firing". Historian Hubert Howe Bancroft, in his "History of California" questioned the accuracy of Castro’s account, as Castañeda's forces had escaped during the night after the first day of the siege. Bancroft wrote:

The "continuous firing of two days" was perhaps continuous only with considerable intervals between the volleys, and it could not have continued into the second day for a longer time than was necessary to make known the flight of the garrison during the night."

Other historians have also questioned the ferocity of the battle. Sol N. Sheridan, in his "History of Ventura County", wrote: "The whole affair resembled rather a sham battle, than the real thing." The Los Angeles Times in 1998 described it as a "quirky skirmish . . . that emptied the mission of wine, and left its adobe walls pockmarked by cannon fire."

=== Castañeda's escape ===
On the night of March 27, Castañeda's forces escaped under cover of night from the Mission and, their horses having been seized by Castro's men, marched on foot toward Los Angeles. Castro sent two companies in pursuit – a company of mounted infantry commanded by Captain Villa and a cavalry company of lancers commanded by Captain Cota. Castro remained in San Buenaventura with the remaining forces, writing to Alvarado that he intended to safeguard their conquest of a place that would be "very advantageous for us."

=== Capture of Castañeda’s forces ===
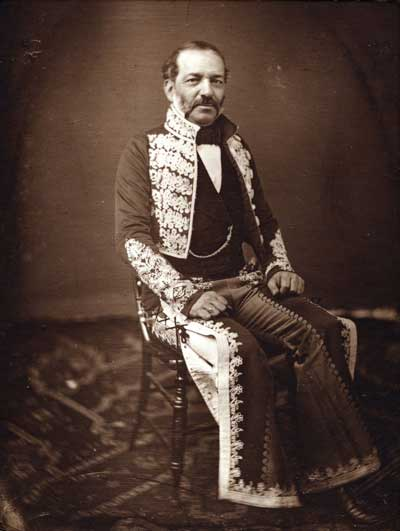
Andrés Pico, captured in the battle

On March 28, Castro's troops, riding on horseback, quickly caught up with Castañeda’s men near Saticoy, a short distance from Ventura. They captured 70 of Castañeda’s men along with "50 muskets and other arms." The soldiers were released, but Castañeda and his officers were arrested and taken to Santa Barbara.

Castro's forces also captured several prominent Carrillo supporters who were found hiding in the Mission. These men, including Andrés Pico (who later negotiated the Treaty of Cahuenga), Luis Arenas (mayor of Los Angeles from 1838 to 1839), and Ygnacio Palomares (owner of the lands encompassing the modern cities of Pomona, San Dimas, Azusa, Covina, Glendora, and Claremont), were taken prisoner and sent north with Castañeda and his officers.

== Aftermath ==
Several of Castañeda's soldiers were not captured and continued toward Los Angeles, meeting up with Pio Pico who was leading a small contingent that had intended to reinforce Castañeda. Pico carried news to Los Angeles of the defeat at San Buenaventura. Carrillo retreated from Los Angeles to San Diego. Castro’s forces continued southward to Los Angeles without opposition. Carrillo assembled a small force in San Diego, but Carrillo surrendered after what has been described as a "mock battle" at Las Flores, California.

Alvarado continued as Governor until 1842, and Carrillo "was paroled" by Alvarado.

For years after the battle, damage caused by Castro's cannonade was still visible on the Mission's exterior walls. During repairs conducted in 1874, a cannonball was extracted from an exterior wall.

In a 1975 archaeological dig at the Mission, six cannon balls were recovered. Their size, about two inches in diameter and weighing one pound, indicate that at least one of the cannons was a small ship gun. One of the cannonballs and two black pieces of grapeshot from the battle are displayed at the Albinger Archaeological Museum in Ventura. The Los Angeles Times in 1992 wrote that the pieces displayed at the Albinger were "are all that is left of the 1838 battle at the San Buenaventura Mission".
