= Saint Mary Cemetery (Oakland, California) =

Catholic cemetery in Alameda County, California

Coordinates: 37°50′06″N 122°14′35″W

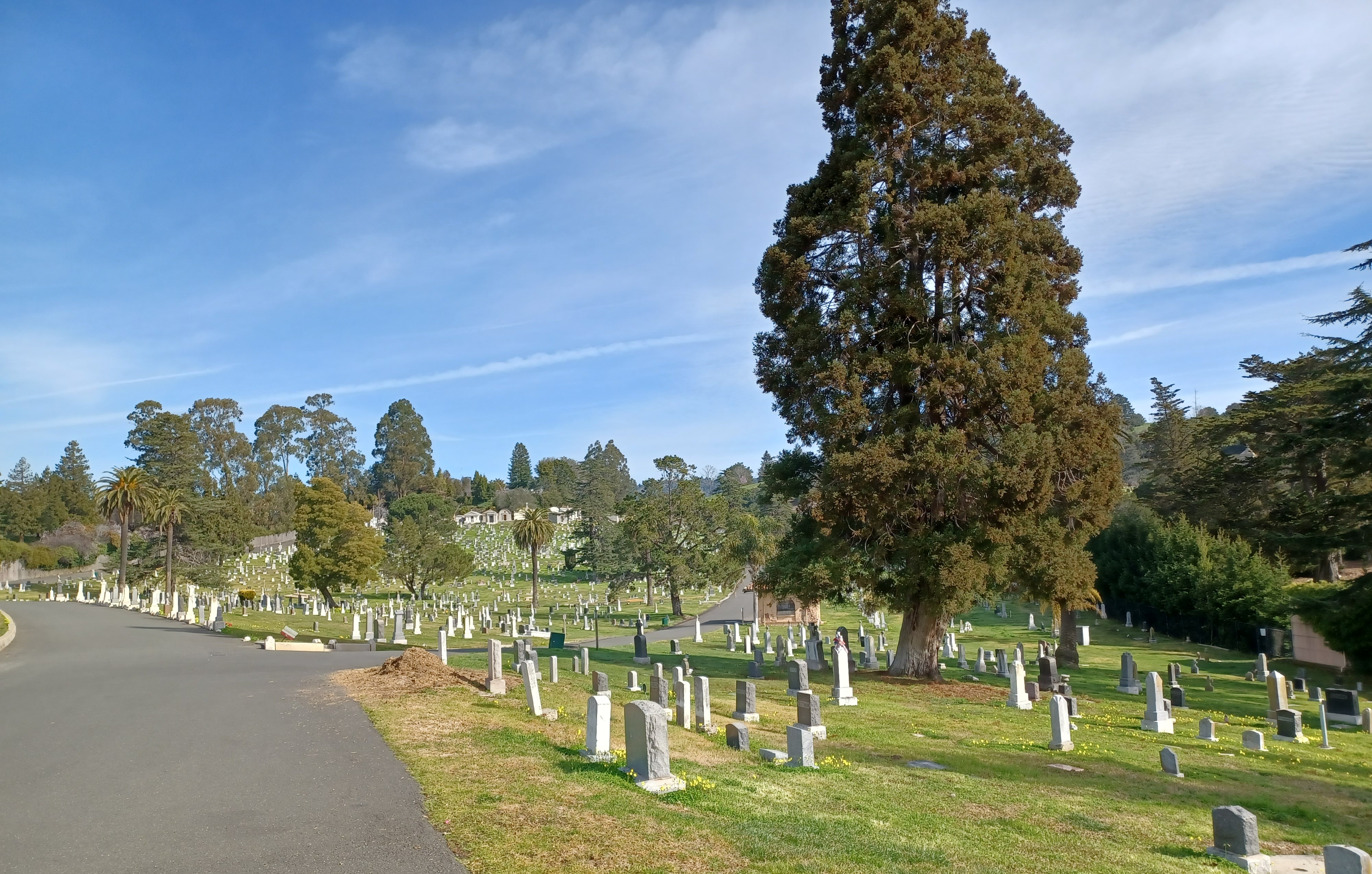
- Interactive map of Saint Mary Cemetery

Details
- Established: 1863
- Location: 4529 Howe St. Oakland, California, United States
- Type: Catholic
- No. of graves: >23,000
- Website: Saint Mary Cemetery

Saint Mary Cemetery (often called Saint Mary's Cemetery) is a Catholic cemetery in Oakland, California, United States. It is adjacent to Mountain View Cemetery.

== Notable burials ==
- Juan Bautista Alvarado (1809–1882), Mexican governor of California
- John A. Benson (1846–1910), figure in the General Land Office scandals 1890–1910.
- Delilah L. Beasley (1871–1934), historian and Oakland Tribune columnist
- John Walter Ehle (1873–1927), Spanish–American War veteran, Medal of Honor recipient
- George Hyde (1819–1890), Mayor (Alcalde) of San Francisco (as a U.S. city) prior to California statehood
- Slip Madigan (1896–1966), football coach
- Joseph A. Sheridan (1909–1962), putative inventor of Irish Coffee
- There is one British Commonwealth war grave, of Leading Aircraftsman James Leslie Kane, Royal Canadian Air Force
