= Isaac Graham =

American pioneer (1800–1863)

- Born: April 15, 1800
- Died: November 8, 1863 (aged 63); Santa Cruz County, California
- Occupations: Fur trader, mountain man, and land grant owner

Isaac Graham (April 15, 1800 – November 8, 1863) was a fur trader, mountain man, and land grant owner in 19th century California.

In 1830, he joined a hunting and trapping party at Fort Smith, Arkansas that included George Nidever. Graham attended the Rendezvous at Pierre's Hole and took part in the battle of Pierre's Hole, in present-day Idaho.

From there, Graham's path to California is unclear. He may have joined Joseph R. Walker's party, or joined one of the groups led by Ewing Young. His son later claimed that Graham came by way of Oregon, while his daughter said he took a southern route through Chihuahua.

The next positive evidence finds him at Natividad on the Rancho La Natividad, northeast of present-day Salinas, in Mexican Alta California. With partners Henry Naile and William Ware, Graham established a distillery to supplement declining incomes from fur trading, owing to dwindling numbers of sea otters from the Central Coast.

== The Graham Affair ==
In 1836 Graham led a group of American and European immigrants who supported Juan Bautista Alvarado and José Castro in the coup against Mexican Governor of Northern California Nicolás Gutiérrez. In 1840 Alvarado had Graham arrested, among a group of about 100 foreigners, and sent about 40 of them to Tepic, Mexico for trial and imprisonment. This action led to a diplomatic crisis (involving Mexico, the United States and the United Kingdom) that became known as the "Graham Affair". With the help of a recent arrival in Monterey, Thomas J. Farnham, Graham and the others were eventually released, having been imprisoned for about a year. Farnham later wrote a romanticized account of these events. Historian Robert Glass Cleland included the Alvarado coup and the Graham Affair with a number of other events promoting a view in Washington that it would be possible and desirable to make California part of the United States.

== Santa Cruz region ==
In 1841, upon his return from Mexico, Graham moved north to the Santa Cruz area, where he established another distillery at Rancho Zayante, near the present-day community of Felton. With help from Danish-immigrant Peter Lassen, Graham built one of the first water-powered sawmills in California. Part of Graham Hill Road, now a major route between Felton and Santa Cruz, was built by Graham to transport his timber to the coast for shipment.

Although not a Mexican citizen, Graham was able to purchase the Rancho Zayante land by proxy through his fellow frontiersman Joseph Majors, owner of the adjacent Rancho San Agustin. Other former mountain men and Graham associates were also at Zayante, including Job Francis Dye, who later dictated a memoir including some adventures he shared with Graham.

Early in 1846, a U.S. Army exploring mission led by John C. Fremont stopped at Graham's Zayante community. Mexican authorities feared that Fremont's hidden purpose was to stir up anti-government sentiments among the Americans there, and Fremont was soon forced to leave California for Oregon. He returned later in the year, after the Mexican–American War began, to recruit volunteers for the California Battalion. Graham himself, at age 46, did not volunteer.

In 1851, Graham purchased Rancho Punta del Año Nuevo, on the coast north of Santa Cruz.

Isaac Graham died in 1863, and is buried at Evergreen Cemetery in Santa Cruz. Part of Graham's former lands are now the community of Felton, California.
