= Diputación de Alta California =

- Alta California

Type
- Type: Unicameral

History
- Founded: 1822
- Disbanded: 1837
- Succeeded by: Diputación de las Californias

Structure
- Length of term: Two years

Meeting place
- Monterey, Alta California

The Excelentísima Diputación de Alta California (Spanish for "Most Excellent Deputation of Upper California) was the unicameral legislature of Alta California, during its period as a Mexican territory. It was the first legislature of what is now California.

== History ==
Alta California was supposed to have formed a provincial diputación while still part of the Spanish Empire, when the 1812 Constitution of Cádiz was officially received and enacted in Alta California in 1820. However, Governor Pablo Vicente de Solá believed that Alta California was not sufficiently developed or ready to govern itself, and thus a diputación was never formed during Spanish rule in California.

The Diputación de Alta California was finally created in the aftermath of the War of Mexican Independence and California's separation from the Spanish Empire in 1822.

In 1827, the diputación voted to change the name of Alta California to "Moctezuma", to honor the famed Aztec Emperor and the nascent Mexican independence, but this decision was overturned by the Mexican Congress of the Union. At the same time, vocal Juan Bandini proposed the renaming of the Los Ángeles to "Victoria de Los Ángeles", which similarly was approved by the diputación but rejected by the Mexican Congress.

=== Disbandment ===
Following the death of Governor José Figueroa in 1835, Carlos Antonio Carrillo, who served representing Alta California in the Congress of the Union in Mexico City, announced that the diputación would move its location from Monterey to Los Angeles. However, the diputación ignored Carrillo's announcement and did not move itself from Monterey and awaited the arrival of the newly-appointed governor, Mariano Chico.

Governor Chico's tenure was short lived, owing to the Californio resistance to Mexico City's appointed governor and the subsequent rebellion led by Juan Bautista Alvarado, a member of the diputación representing Monterey, who convinced the diputación to issue the Declaration of Independence of Alta California from Mexico on November 3, 1836.

With the reunification of Alta California and Baja California into a single territory known as the Department of the Californias on 10 December 1836, the diputación was dissolved with the creation of the Junta Departamental, more commonly known as the Diputación de las Californias.

== Composition ==
The diputación was made up of 7 members (vocales), as well as a secretary in charge of calling votes and recording legislative logs. Each member represented one of the 4 presidio military districts or the 3 civilian pueblos:

- Presidio of San Francisco (San Francisco)
- Presidio of Monterey (Monterey)
- Presidio of Santa Barbara (Santa Barbara)
- Presidio of San Diego (San Diego)
- Pueblo de la Reina de Los Ángeles (Los Angeles)
- Pueblo de Branciforte (Santa Cruz)
- Pueblo de San José de Guadalupe (San Jose)

Members of the diputación were elected by the local ayuntamiento (municipal government) of the civilian pueblos or appointed by the presiding Commandant of the presidios. Substitutes (suplentes) were chosen as alternate members, to serve in the diputación when a member was otherwise unable.

=== Members ===
Members (Vocales) of the Diputación de Alta California
Name	Constituency	Tenure	Notes	References
Pío Pico	Los Angeles	1828-1834; 1845	Senior Vocal of the diputación in 1831-1832.	
José Castro	Monterey	1824-1825; 1833-1836	Senior Vocal of the diputación in 1835. Suplente in 1822.	
Juan Bautista Alvarado		1834-1836	Senior Vocal of the diputación in 1836.	
Mariano Guadalupe Vallejo	San Francisco	1830-1832		
José Tiburcio Castro	Monterey	1828-1831		
Antonio María Osio		1830-1832		
José Joaquín Ortega	San Diego	1830-1834		
Juan Bandini	San Diego	1827-1828; 1845-1846		
Manuel Jimeno Casarín		1834-1835; 1839-1842		
José Ramón Estrada		1837		
Tiburcio Tapía		1827; 1833		
Francisco María Ortega		1822-1824		
Carlos Antonio Carrillo		1828; 1833-1835		
Juan Bautista Alvarado		1839	Cousin of similarly-named Juan Bautista Alvarado.	
Carlos Antonio Castro		1822-1825; 1830	Substituted by Ignacio López in 1822. Suplente in 1822 and 1839.	
Francisco María Castro		1822-1825		
José Aruz		1822		
Ignacio López		1822		
José Antonio Carrillo	Los Angeles	1822-1824; 1828; 1833-1834		
José Palomares	Los Angeles	1822		
José Mariano Estrada		1827		
Ygnacio Martínez		1827		
Antonio María Ortega		1827		
Antonio Buelna		1827-1830; 1834-1835		
Anastasio Carrillo		1827-1828		
Vicente Sánchez		1828		
Salvio Pacheco		1830	Suplente in 1834-1835.	
Santiago Argüello		1832		
Tomás Yorba		1832		
Francisco de Haro		1833-1834		
José Antonio Estudillo		1833-1835		
Rafael Gómez		1836		
David Spence		1836		
Manuel Crespo		1836		
Joaquín Gómez		1836		
José de la Guerra y Noriega		1836		

=== Secretaries ===
Secretaries of the Diputación de Alta California
Name	Tenure	Notes	References
Francisco de Haro	1822-1823		
José Joaquín de la Torre	1824-1825		
Juan Bautista Alvarado	1827-1834		
Agustín V. Zamorano	1834		
José M. Maldonado	1834-1835		
