= List of governors of California before 1850 =

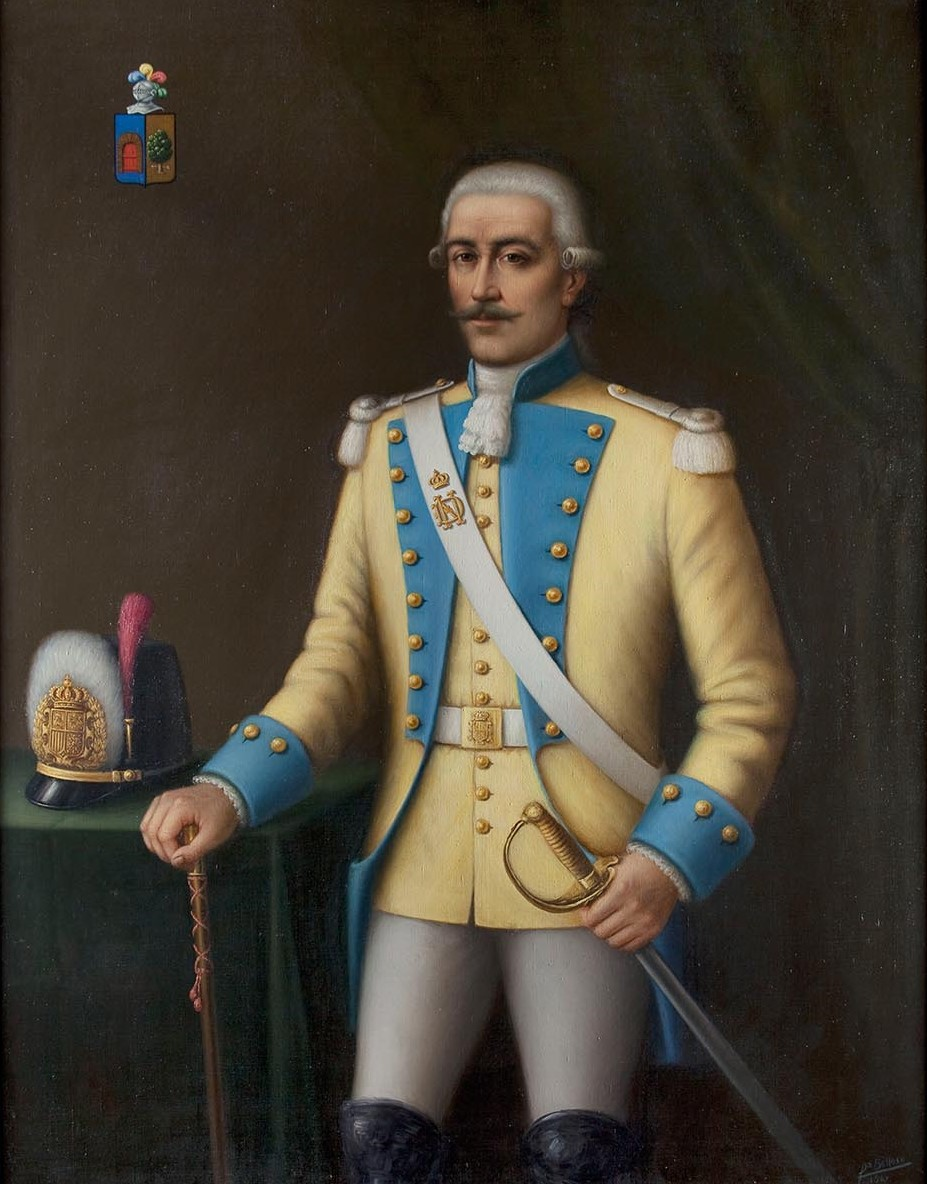
Gaspar de Portolá, 1st Governor of the Californias.

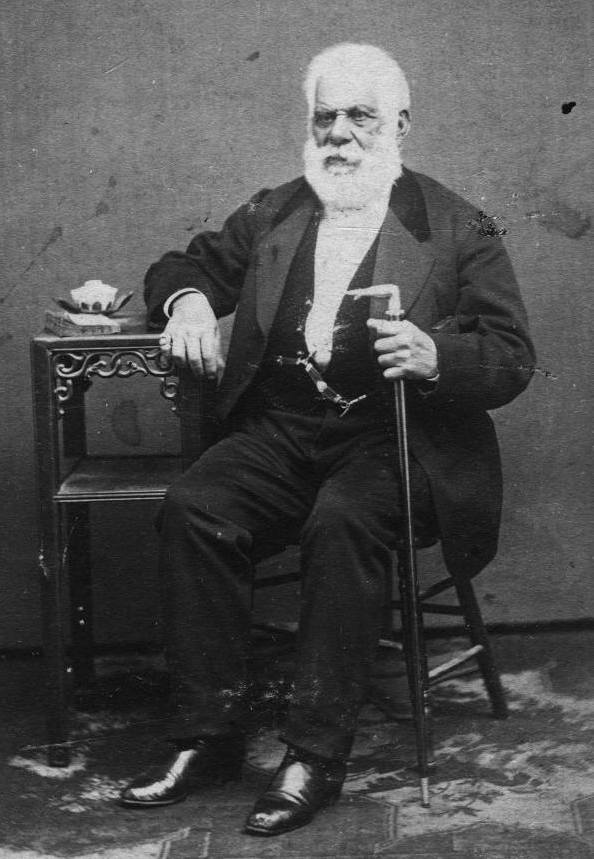
Don Pío Pico, last Governor of Alta California.

Below is a list of the governors of early California (1769–1850), before its admission as the 31st U.S. state. First explored by Gaspar de Portolá, with colonies established at San Diego and Monterey, Las Californias was a remote, sparsely settled Spanish province of the viceroyalty of New Spain. In 1822, following Mexican independence, California became part of Mexico.

In 1836, a coup led by Californios Juan Bautista Alvarado and José Castro eventually resulted in Alvarado becoming governor. That conflict ended in 1838, when the central government of Mexico recognized Alvarado as governor

Another disputed governorship occurred in 1844, settled when another Californio, Pio Pico, became the last Governor of Mexican California. In 1846, the "Bear Flag Revolt" in Sonoma declared California an independent republic—the "Bear Flag Republic". No government was formed, however, and the revolt did not have time to spread very far because California came under U.S. military occupation at the outset of the Mexican–American War less than a month later. California was ceded to the U.S. in 1848, and was admitted as the 31st U.S. state on September 9, 1850. Peter Burnett, the last governor of the post-war military territory, became its first state governor after admission.

== Spanish rule (1769–1822) ==
The Spanish Empire established its rule in the Californias in 1769. During this time, the province of Las Californias encompassed a massive territorial expanse, including both Alta California (present day U.S. state of California) and Baja California (present day Mexican states of Baja California and Baja California Sur), which were governed under a military administration led by the Governor of Las Californias. In 1804, Las Californias were officially divided into two administrations: Alta California, based in Monterey, and Baja California, based in Loreto.

=== Spanish governors of Las Californias (1769–1804) ===
From 1769 to 1804, Las Californias were governed as one administrative unit within the Spanish Empire, the province of Las Californias. Following 1804, Alta California and Baja California each had their own administration.

No.	Portrait	Governor	Took office	Left office	Notes
1st		Gaspar de Portolá (1716–1786)	1767	1770	Led the Portolá expedition; Founded Monterey
2nd		Felipe de Barri (1700s–1784)	1770	1774	While Barri officially served as Governor of Las Californias, Fages maintained effective military control over Alta California, taking advantage of Barri's government being based in Baja California.
Acting		Pedro Fages (1734–1794)	1770	1774	While Barri officially served as Governor of Las Californias, Fages maintained effective military control over Alta California. Fages effectively stepped down as acting governor in 1774, at the request of Junípero Serra
3rd		Fernando Rivera y Moncada (1725–1781)	1774	1777	Founded San Francisco
4th		Felipe de Neve (1724–1784)	1777	1782	Founded Los Angeles; Founded San Jose
5th		Pedro Fages (1734–1794)	1782	1791	Fages previously served as the acting military governor of Alta California from 1770 to 1774, during Barri's tenure, prior to officially serving as Governor of Las Californias
6th		José Antonio Roméu (1734–1792)	1791	1792	Roméu died soon after his appointment, prior to officially ending his tenure of office.
Interim		José Joaquín de Arrillaga (1750–1814)	1792	1794	Arrillaga was designated as interim governor following the death of Roméu in 1792, until the appointment of Borica in 1794.
7th		Diego de Borica (1742–1800)	1794	1800	Founded Branciforte
Interim		Pedro de Alberní y Teixidor (1742–1800)	1800	1800	Alberní served as interim governor following Borica's resignation and prior to Arrillaga's appointment.
8th		José Joaquín de Arrillaga (1750–1814)	1800	1804	Arrillaga was served as Governor of Las Californias until 1804, when Las Californias were administratively divided into Alta California and Baja California.; Arrillaga subsequently served as Governor of Alta California until his death in 1814.

=== Spanish governors of Alta California (1804–1822) ===
Following the division of the province of Las Californias in 1804, Alta California came to have its own administration. José Joaquín de Arrillaga, who had served as Governor of Las Californias until 1804 subsequently served as the first governor of Alta California.

No.	Portrait	Governor	Took office	Left office	Notes
1st		José Joaquín de Arrillaga (1750–1814)	1804	1814	Arrillaga was served as Governor of Las Californias until 1804, when Las Californias were administratively divided into Alta California and Baja California.; Arrillaga subsequently served as Governor of Alta California until his death in 1814.
Interim		José Darío Argüello (1753–1828)	1814	1815	Argüello was served as interim governor following the death of Arrillaga and prior to the appointment of Solá.
2nd		Pablo Vicente de Solá (1753–1828)	1815	1822	Solá successfully oversaw the transition of Alta California from Spanish rule to newly independent Mexico.

== Mexican rule (1822–1846) ==
Following the Mexican War of Independence, both of the Californias were again split by the newly independent Mexico. Direct rule from Mexico City over Alta California was briefly challenged from November 1836 to July 1837 by a regional revolt led by Juan Bautista Alvarado, who was acclaimed Governor of the Free and Sovereign State of Alta California. While the movement initially used federalist rhetoric to demand local autonomy for Californios, it collapsed due to intense internal opposition from loyalist southern California factions. To preserve his political standing, Alvarado abandoned the rebellion by formally swearing allegiance to Mexico’s new centralist constitution, the Siete Leyes. Recognizing his submission, the central Mexican government officially appointed Alvarado as the constitutional Governor of the newly organized department comprising both Californias in 1838, thereby maintaining Mexican sovereignty over the region until 1846.

=== Mexican governors of Alta California (1822–1836) ===
No.	Portrait	Governor	Took office	Left office	Notes
3rd		Luis Antonio Argüello (1784–1830)	1822	1825	First governor to be born in California
4th		José María de Echeandía (1800s–1871)	1825	1831	Echeandía issued the Prevenciónes de Emancipacion (Proclamation of Emancipation) declaring all Native Californians freed from Californian mission system in 1826.
5th		Manuel Victoria (1700s–1833)	1831	1832	Victoria's tenure as governor was unpopular and short-lived, owing to his anti-democratic reforms. His governorship ended following his defeat at the Battle of Cahuenga Pass in 1831, when Californios overthrew him.
Interim		José María de Echeandía (1800s–1871)	1832	1833	Echeandía served as interim governor following Victoria's defeat at the Battle of Cahuenga Pass, prior to the appointment of Figueroa in 1833.
6th		José Figueroa (1792–1835)	1833	1835	Figueroa oversaw the secularization of the California missions.
Interim		José Castro (1808–1860)	1835	1836	Castro was nominated as interim governor after Figuroa resigned due to his worsening health.
Interim		Nicolás Gutiérrez (1700s–1800s)	1836	1836	Gutiérrez served as interim governor until the arrival of Chico.
7th		Mariano Chico (1796–1850)	1836	1836	Chico was exiled after a popular uprising of Californios against his rule.
Interim		Nicolás Gutiérrez (1700s–1800s)	1836	1836	Gutiérrez resumed his role as interim governor after Chico's exile from California.; He was deposed at Monterey in early November 1836 by a pronunciamiento led by José Castro and Juan Bautista Alvarado.

=== Governor of the Free and Sovereign State Alta California (1836–1837) ===
After the unpopular Mexico-appointed governors Mariano Chico and Nicolás Gutiérrez tried to enforce the centralist Siete Leyes, Juan Bautista Alvarado and José Castro, senior members of the Diputación de Alta California, deposed Gutiérrez at Monterey in early November 1836. On 7 November the diputación adopted the Plan of Monterey. Article 1 declared that Alta California would secede from Mexico if the federal system of 1824 was not restored. Article 2 declare the sitting diputación a constituent congress and erected Alta California as an Estado Libre y Soberano, the ordinary title of a Mexican federal state under the Constitution of 1824. Castro, as president of the diputación, briefly acted as executive. On 7 December 1836 Alvarado was named interim governor, to serve until a constitutional appointment.

No.	Portrait	Governor	Took office	Left office	Notes
1st		Juan Bautista Alvarado (1809–1882)	1836	1837	Alvarado helped depose Gutiérrez in November 1836. The diputación’s Plan of Monterey made Alta California a Free and Sovereign State pending restoration of the Constitution of 1824. On 7 December 1836 Alvarado was named interim governor.; Alvarado never held uncontested control of the department. Los Angeles and San Diego treated Monterey's actions as an act of northern force and insisted on remaining under the national government; On 9 July 1837, at Santa Barbara, Alvarado swore the Siete Leyes, dropped the free and sovereign state title, and styled himself interim governor of the Deparment of Alta California. Captain Andrés Castillero, acting for the central government, obtained Alvarado’s oath.

=== Mexican governors of Las Californias (1837–47) ===
By July 1837 Alvarado had already sworn the Siete Leyes and claimed the department as interim governor. Independently, and before Mexico City knew of that oath, the ministry named Carlos Antonio Carrillo provisional governor on 6 June 1837, on the advice of his brother José Antonio that a native ruler would restore order without an expedition. The commission arrived in October. Carrillo took the oath at Los Angeles on 6 December 1837 and held the south. Norteños in support of Alvarado and Sureños in support of Carrillo clashed at San Buenaventura and at Las Flores. After Castillero reported the July submission, Mexico ordered Alvarado as the senior vocal of the reinstated diputación to act as governor, organize a junta and to send a terna to Mexico city for the regular appointment.

No.	Portrait	Governor	Took office	Left office	Notes
Interim		Juan Bautista Alvarado (1809–1882)	1837	1839	Swore the Siete Leyes at Santa Barbara. Held the office as senior vocal of the restored diputación. Mexico, still unaware of the oath, named Carrillo on 6 June 1837.
Iterim		Carlos Antonio Carrillo (1783–1852)	1837	1837	Appointed provisional governor on 6 June 1837, before Mexico knew Alvarado had sworn the Siete Leyes. The commission reached California in October. Carrillo took the oath at Los Angeles on 6 December 1837 and held the south. After Castillero’s report, the interior ministry directed on 20 July 1838 that the senior vocal of the diputación would exercise the governorship pending a regular appointment. The same dispatch that left Alvarado acting as senior vocal, authorized a preferential grant of one Channel Island to José Antonio and Carlos Carrillo “in consideration of their patriotic services"
8th		Juan Bautista Alvarado (1809–1882)	1839	1842	From 9 July 1837 Alvarado was interim governor as senior vocal of the restored diputación, Mexico confirmed him as such on 20 July 1838. The junta’s terna of 6 March 1839 listed Alvarado, José Castro, and Pío Pico. President Bustamante named him gobernador propietario on 7 August 1839; he took that oath on 24 November 1839 and served until 31 December 1842
9th		Manuel Micheltorena (1804–1853)	1842	1845	Micheltorena was deposed as governor after his defeat at the Battle of Providencia
10th		Pío Pico (1801–1894)	1845	1846	In the aftermath of the Battle of Providencia, Pico was acclaimed governor.; Following the American Conquest of California, the administration of Alta California came under control of the U.S. Military Governor of California.
Nominated		José María Flores (1818–1866)	1846	1847	Flores was nominated as governor following the outbreak of the Mexican–American War and tasked with reclaiming Alta California for Mexico.; Despite victories at the Battle of Chino and the Battle of Rancho Domínguez, Flores was unable to reestablish Mexican rule following his defeat at the Battle of Rio San Gabriel and the Battle of La Mesa.
Nominated		Andrés Pico (1810–1876)	1847	1847	Pico served as Acting Governor for three days before signing the Treaty of Cahuenga, ending the Conquest of California

== American military rule (1846–1849) ==
Following the American Conquest of California, forces part of the Pacific Squadron and California Battalion established U.S. military rule in California, beginning in 1846. Military governors ruled California until 1849, when efforts led by Bennet C. Riley led to the creation of the Constitution of California at the Constitutional Convention of Monterey and the establishment of civilian rule with the election of Peter Hardeman Burnett as the first governor of California. Soon after, California was admitted as a state.

=== U.S. military governors of California (1846–1849) ===
No.	Portrait	Governor	Took office	Left office	Notes
1st		John D. Sloat (1781–1867)	1846	1846	Sloat was commander of the Pacific Squadron, which led the Conquest of California. Following his capture of Monterey, capital of Alta California, Sloat served as the U.S. Military Governor of California for 22 days prior to the arrival of Stockton.
2nd		Robert F. Stockton (1795–1866)	1846	1847	Stockton successfully defeated the Mexican forces attempting to reclaim Alta California at the Battle of Rio San Gabriel and Battle of La Mesa.
3rd		John C. Frémont (1813–1890)	1847	1847	Frémont was appointed by Stockton as his successor in 1847.; Following Frémont's leadership in the mutiny of the California Battalion, he was court martialed and removed as military governor.
4th		Stephen W. Kearny (1794–1848)	1847	1847	Kearny succeeded Frémont as military governor, following Frémont's conviction for mutiny.
5th		Richard Barnes Mason (1797–1850)	1847	1849	Mason served as military governor during the outbreak of the California Gold Rush
6th		Persifor Frazer Smith (1798–1858)	February 28, 1849	April 12, 1849	Smith's brief tenure as military governor was marked by his efforts to support settlers travelling across the Sierra Nevada.
7th		Bennet C. Riley (1787–1853)	1849	1849	Riley's tenure as military governor was marked by his efforts to establish a civilian government and statehood in California. The 1849 Constitutional Convention of Monterey drafted the first Constitution of California during his term.; Riley successfully passed the administration of California to civilian control with the election of Peter Hardeman Burnett in 1849, who would serve as the 1st Governor of California

== See also ==
- Governor of California
- List of governors of California, since 1850
- List of Californios people
- The Californias
- Alta California
