= José Castro =

Californio politician (1808–1860)

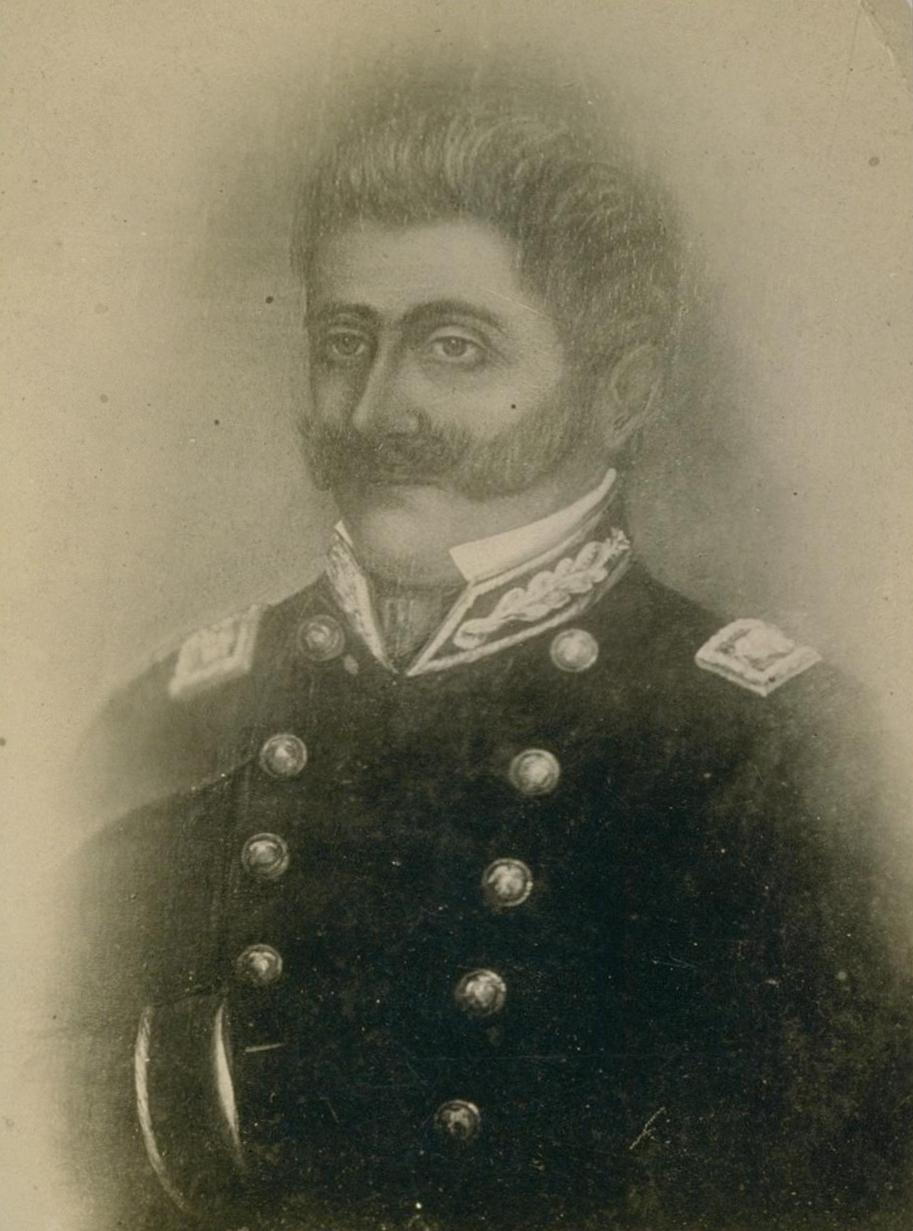

Chief Executive of the North District of the Federal Territory of Baja California
- In office 1853–1860
- Preceded by: José María Larroque
- Succeeded by: José Sáenz

Interim Governor of Alta California
- In office 29 September 1835 – 1 January 1836
- Appointed by: José Figueroa
- Preceded by: José Figueroa
- Succeeded by: Nicolás Gutiérrez

Personal details
- Born: 1808 Monterey, Alta California, Viceroyalty of New Spain (now California, U.S.)
- Died: February 1860 (aged 51–52) Baja California Territory, Mexico
- Resting place: Carmel Mission Cemetery, Carmel-by-the-Sea, California
- Occupation: Soldier; statesman

Military service
- Allegiance: Mexico; Alta California
- Branch/service: Cavalry
- Rank: Lieutenant Colonel
- Battles/wars: Mexican Federalist Wars; California revolt of 1836; Battle of Providencia; Mexican–American War

José Antonio Castro (1808 – February 1860) was a Californio politician, statesman, and general who served as interim Governor of Alta California and later Governor of Baja California. During the Bear Flag Revolt and the American Conquest of California, Castro led Mexican forces as the Commandante General of Northern California.

== Biography ==
José Antonio María de Jesús Castro was a Californio, born in Monterey, California, when it was under Spanish colonial rule. His father José Tiburcio Castro was a soldier, member of the Diputación (territorial legislature), mayordomo (administrator) of Mission San Juan Bautista after it was secularized, and grantee of Rancho Sausal.

As a young man, Castro was a vocal and active supporter of Californian self-rule and full independence from Mexico. His first public office was as secretary to the Monterey ayuntamiento (town council). In 1830, Castro was arrested for his opposition to the Mexican governor of Alta California. By 1835 he was Vocal Primero (First Member) of the legislature and acting governor. Along with his brother-in-law Juan Bautista Alvarado, he was a vocal proponent of California-born governors and sought a semi-independent status for Alta California.

=== Rebellions against Gutiérrez and Micheltorena ===
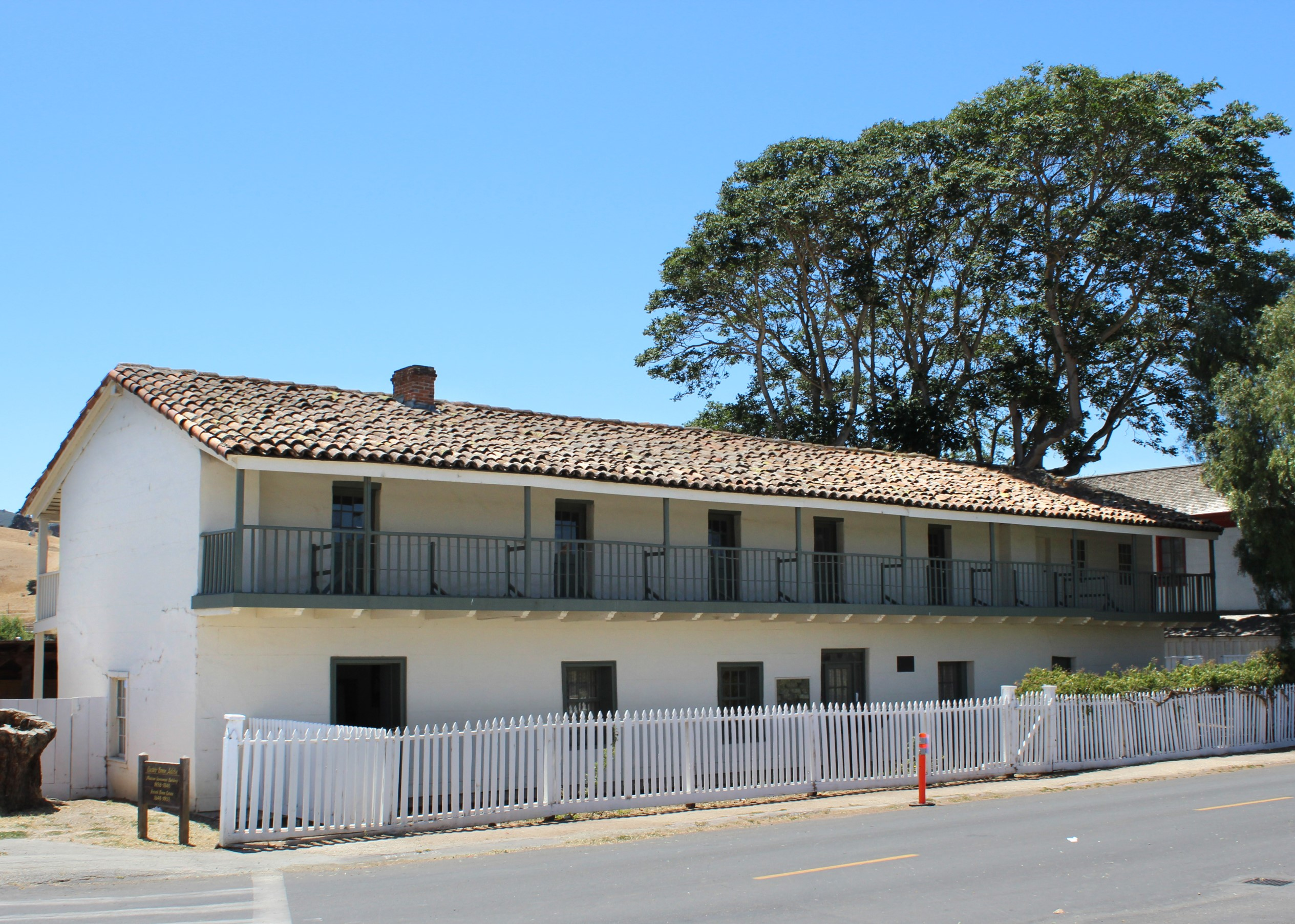
José Castro House in San Juan Bautista was built 1839–41. The town of San Juan Bautista was briefly known as San Juan de Castro in the 1830s, owing to his family's prominence there.

A long period in which far-away Mexico City neglected California and sent up scandalous and incompetent governors culminated with six chief executives taking office in Monterey in 1836 alone. In November 1836, Castro helped lead the overthrow of newly appointed Mexican Governor Nicolás Gutiérrez.

An end to the rebellion was negotiated, and Alvarado became the legitimate governor from 1837 to 1842. Castro served under Alvarado as Lieutenant-Colonel of militia. Once again, he was appointed First Member of the Diputación as well as Prefect of the District of Monterey.

In 1839, Governor Alvarado granted him Rancho San Justo, which included the settlement surrounding Mission San Juan Bautista. The grant followed the secularization of the mission by the Mexican government in 1833, which privatized former mission lands. Castro built an adobe house on San Juan Bautista Plaza in 1841. He used the house as an administrative base for his military operations, and as a residence for his secretary.

Back in 1840, Alvarado had arrested about one hundred Americans in California and transported them to San Blas, an action that sparked an international diplomatic incident known as the "Graham Affair". By 1844–45, Castro was a leader of the new revolt against Governor Manuel Micheltorena, once again becoming Commandante General under new governor Pio Pico.

=== Conquest of California ===
During the Bear Flag Revolt of 1846 and the American Conquest of California that followed, Castro was the commanding general of Alta California's forces during the Mexican–American War. When California joined the United States in August 1846, Castro left for Baja California, taking up residence in Sinaloa. Castro returned to Alta California in 1848.

=== Post-Conquest and later life ===
In February 1848, after the Mexican–American War ended, José Castro opened his adobe house in San Juan Bautista to an Irish settler, Patrick Breen. Breen and his family were surviving members of the Donner Party. They arrived at San Juan Bautista nearly a year after surviving their arduous journey over the Sierra Nevada. The Breens were the first English-speaking Americans to live in the town. Castro allowed them to live at the house until one of Patrick Breen's teenage sons made a fortune as a gold miner and purchased the house from Castro in 1854. Castro left California for Baja California in 1853 where he was appointed governor and military commander.

Castro never surrendered his Mexican citizenship nor military rank. In February 1860, Castro was killed by Manuel Márquez, in an incident variously described as an assassination or a barroom brawl.

== Legacy ==
San Francisco's Castro Street, and the Castro District are named after him.

The José Castro House in San Juan Bautista is a National Historic Landmark. The town of San Juan Bautista was briefly known as San Juan de Castro in the 1830s, owing to the prominence of Castro's family in that town.
