= Juan Bautista Alvarado =

Californio politician (1809–1882)

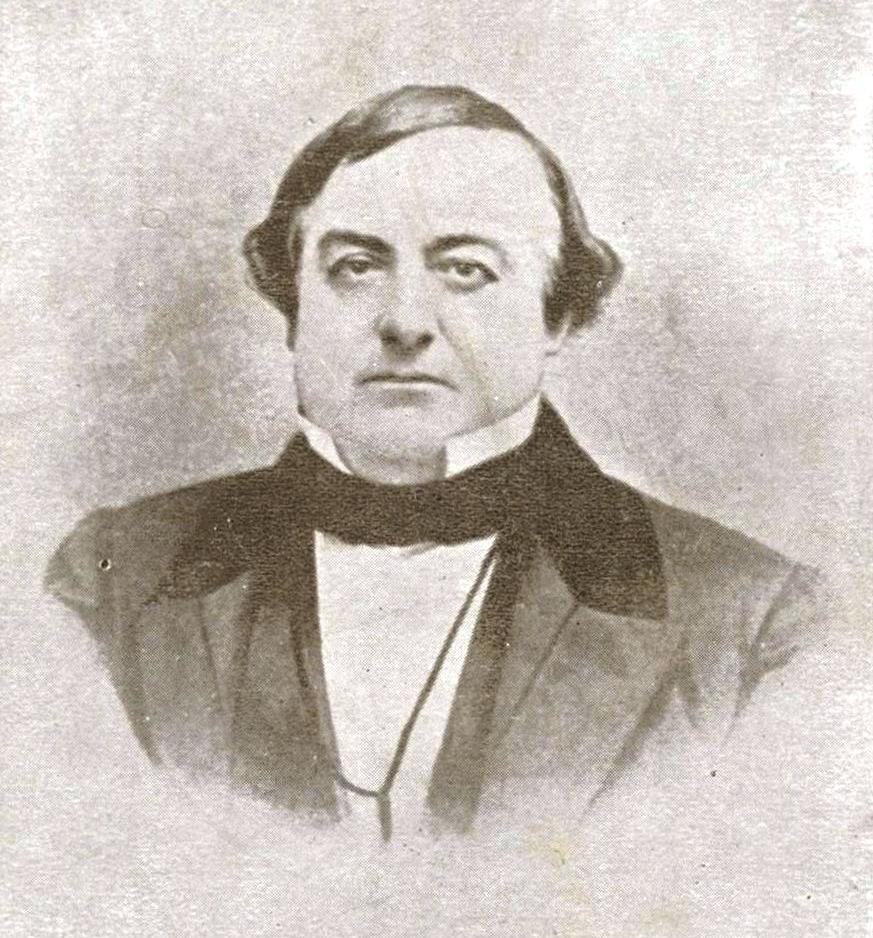

8th Governor of The Californias
- In office 24 November 1839 – 31 December 1842
- Appointed by: Anastasio Bustamante
- Preceded by: Himself (interim)
- Succeeded by: Manuel Micheltorena

Interim Governor of The Californias
- In office 9 July 1837 – 24 November 1839 (disputed from 1837–1838)
- Appointed by: Diputación de Alta California
- Preceded by: Himself (interim)
- Succeeded by: Himself (constitutional)

Interim Governor of Alta California (Note: Under the Plan of Monterey he used the style gobernador interino del estado libre y soberano de la Alta California, the ordinary designation of a Mexican federal state. The style was dropped on 9 July 1837 when he swore the Siete Leyes and continued as first vocal of the restored diputación and governor ad interim.)
- In office 7 December 1836 – 9 July 1837 (disputed)
- Appointed by: Diputación de Alta California
- Preceded by: Nicolás Gutiérrez
- Succeeded by: Himself (interim governor of the Californias)

Member of the General Congress of the Mexican Republic
- Elected; October 1845 – Not seated
- Constituency: Department of The Californias

Personal details
- Born: 14 February 1809 Monterey, Alta California, Viceroyalty of New Spain (Now California, U.S.)
- Died: 13 July 1882 (aged 73) San Pablo, California
- Spouse: María Martina Castro de Alvarado (m. 1839)
- Occupation: Ranchero; politician

Military service
- Allegiance: Mexico
- Branch/service: Mexican Army
- Years of service: 1843–1848
- Rank: Colonel
- Unit: California militia
- Battles/wars: Mexican Federalist Wars; California Revolt of 1836; Battle of San Buenaventura; Battle of Providencia; Mexican–American War; Conquest of California

Juan Bautista Valentín Alvarado y Vallejo (14 February 1809 – 13 July 1882) usually known as Juan Bautista Alvarado (Spanish pronunciation: [/ˈxwam bawˈtista alβaˈɾaðo/] huan-bau-tis-ta-al-ba-ra-do), was a Californio ranchero and politician who was the longest-serving governor of California’s Mexican era. A native of Monterey and a member of the Diputación de Alta California, he came to power in November 1836 at the head of the Plan of Monterey, which deposed Governor Nicolás Gutiérrez, suspended relations with Mexico City and demanded the restoration of the federal constitution of 1824. The south treated the plan as a northern aggression and contested the office. During that contest, Alvarado swore the centralist Siete Leyes and assumed governorship ad interim. Later confirmed by the central government, he held the office until 1842.

He was later commissioned a colonel in the Mexican Army's auxiliarie militia and elected a deputy to Congress, though he never took his seat. In the Mexican–American War he served as second-in-command to long time ally José Castro, the region's comandante general. He was captured, paroled and after the end of the war, declined office under the new government, spending his last years as a private citizen on Rancho San Pablo.

== Early years ==
Alvarado was born in Monterey, Alta California, to Jose Francisco Alvarado and María Josefa Vallejo. His grandfather Juan Bautista Alvarado accompanied Gaspar de Portolá as an enlisted man in the Spanish Army in 1769. His father died a few months after his birth and his mother remarried three years later, leaving Juan Bautista in the care of his grandparents on the Vallejo side, where he and Mariano Guadalupe Vallejo grew up together. They were both taught by William Edward Petty Hartnell, an English merchant living in Monterey.

In 1827, eighteen-year-old Alvarado was hired as secretary to the Diputación de Alta California (legislature). In 1829 he was briefly arrested along with Vallejo and José Castro by soldiers involved in the military revolt led by Joaquín Solis. In 1831 he built a house in Monterey for his mistress, Juliana Francisca Ramona y Castillo, whom he called "Raymunda", to live in. It's possible the home was for her sister, Maria Reymunda Castillo. Over the years, the pair had at least two illegitimate daughters whom he recognized: Estefana del Rosario (born 1834) and Maria Francisca de la Asencion (born 1836). They may have had several more that he did not recognize, but they never married. During this period Alvarado began drinking heavily.

=== Support of secularization ===
Alvarado supported secularization of the Spanish missions in California. He was appointed by José María de Echeandía to oversee the turn over of Mission San Miguel, even though Echeandía was no longer governor. The new governor Manuel Victoria rescinded the order and sought to have Alvarado and Castro arrested. The pair fled and were hidden by their old friend Vallejo, who had become adjutant at the Presidio of San Francisco. However, Victoria was unpopular and Echeandía overthrew his rule and replaced him with Pío de Jesús Pico near the end of 1831. Secularization of the missions resumed in 1833.

In 1834 Alvarado was elected to the Diputación de Alta California as a delegate and appointed customs inspector in Monterey. Governor José Figueroa granted Rancho El Sur, two square leagues of land, or about 9,000 acres (3,600 ha), south of Monterey, to Alvarado on October 30, 1834.

== 1836 revolt and civil war ==
=== Plan of Monterey ===
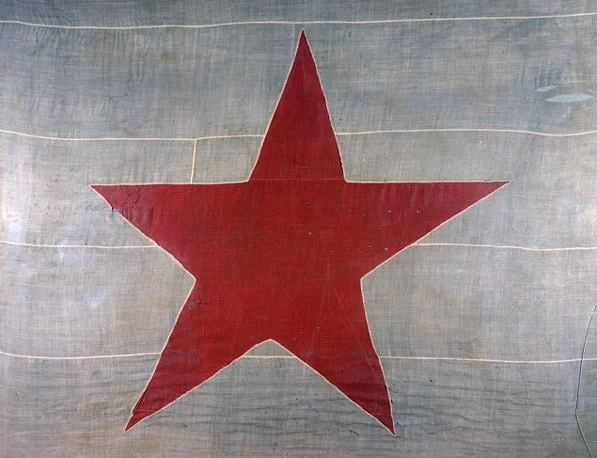
The last Red Lone Star Flag, held at the Autry Museum in Los Angeles. Contemporaries record that it was made ready, but not raised and that the Mexican colors were kept in place.

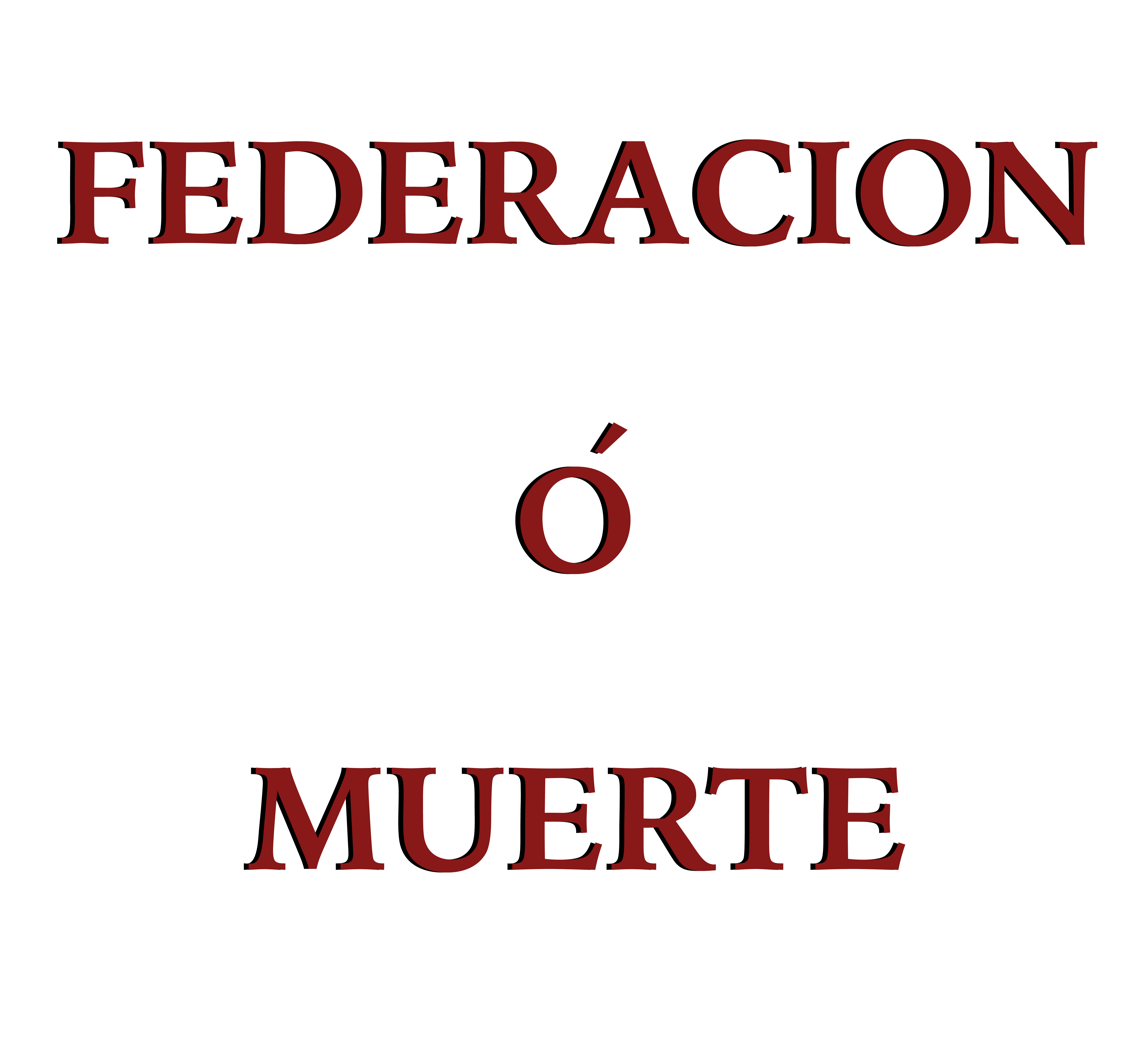
Reconstruction of a banner associated with the 1836 rising. Period accounts treat “Federation or Death” as the movement's motto

After Figueroa’s death in 1835, Mexico City sent two unpopular centralist governors, Mariano Chico and Nicolás Gutiérrez. Californios already objected to distant appointments, to the Siete Leyes replacing the Constitution of 1824, and to control of the Monterey custom house.

In early November, 1836 Alvarado and Castro, with political support from Mariano Guadalupe Vallejo and a small company of foreign riflemen under Isaac Graham, seized Monterey. Gutiérrez surrendered after a single cannon shot and was shipped to Mexico with a number of officers.

After Monterey fell, Americans in the port prepared a cloth patterned after the Texas Lone Star Flag and pressed to hoist it over the presidio, talking of United States protection and of aid from the sloop Peacock. Alvarado later admitted that such a flag had been made ready and that raising it was discussed. The revolt ultimately did not let the Americans raise it. Inocente García, the standard-bearer, stopped Captain William Hinckley from hoisting the new flag and kept the national banner in its place. The Americans then withdrew in disgust, except a few riflemen hired at two dollars a day.

On 7 November the Diputación adopted the Plan of Monterey presented by Alvarado. Article 1 declared that Alta California would secede from Mexico if the federal system of 1824 was not restored. Article 2 declare the sitting diputación a constituent congress and erected Alta California as an Estado Libre y Soberano, the ordinary title of a Mexican federal state under the Constitution of 1824. In a printed broadside of 24 February 1837, Vallejo, signing as comandante general, told the department that the November change had been made so that Alta California could be raised to the rank of a state, because only in that way would it stand equal in political rights with the rest of the Republic. Castro, as president of the diputación, briefly acted as executive. On 7 December 1836 Alvarado was named interim governor, to serve until a constitutional appointment. A printed manifesto addressed Californios as obedient sons of the motherland and closed by stating that they were free and federalists. It named the banner of the movement in the same breath: “You…boldly waved the banner of the free, Federation or Death.”

=== Oath to the government and disputed governorship ===
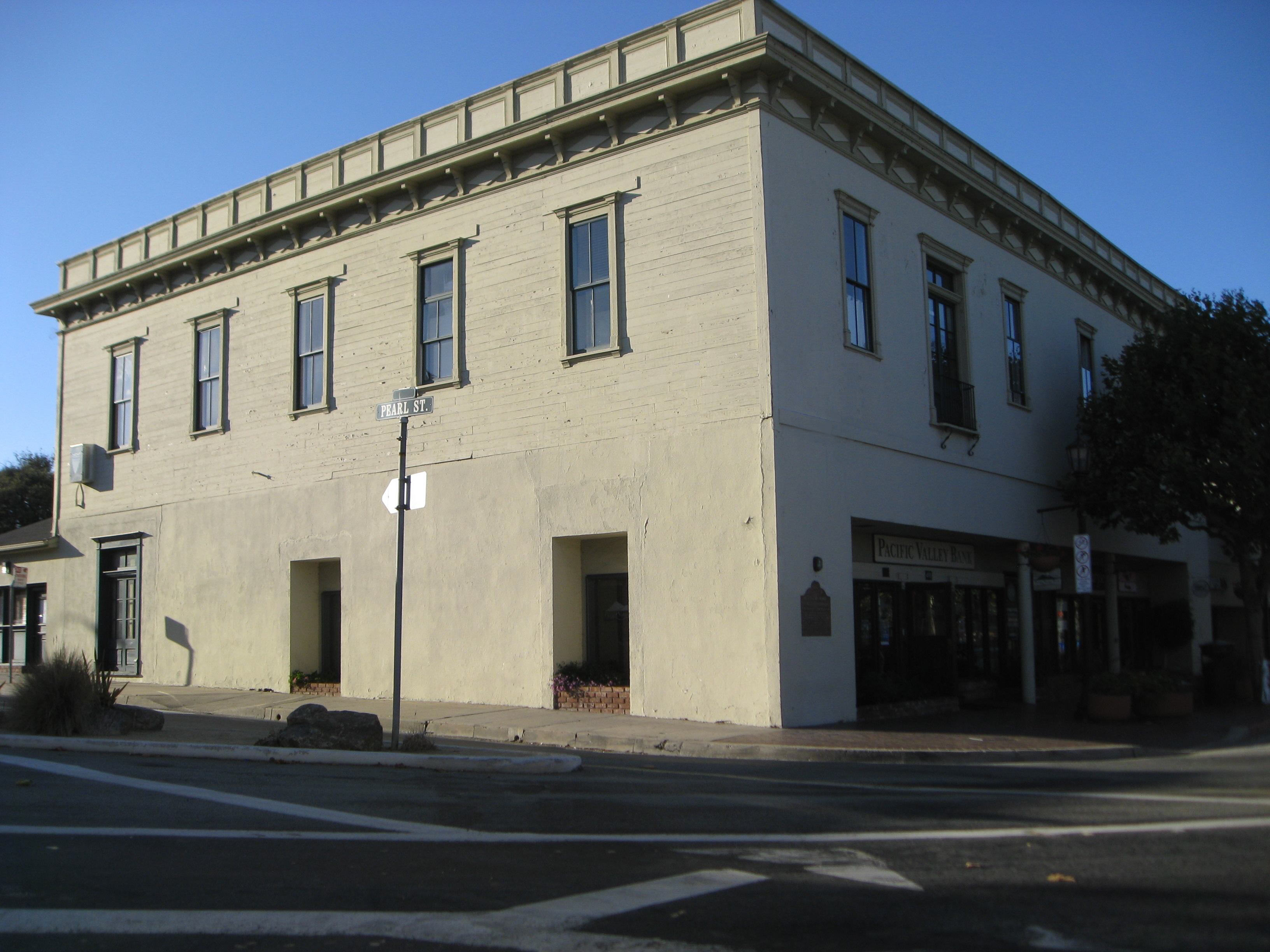
Governor Alvarado House, a landmark in Monterey, California

The south treated the Plan of Monterey as an act of northern force. Alvarado and Castro marched down the coast in January 1837. After San Fernando was given up, the Los Angeles ayuntamiento still resolved that California was not libre y soberano, that Alvarado was not its governor, and that the pueblo would defend the laws of the supreme government. A local settlement was patched up; Alvarado left a small garrison and returned to Santa Barbara.

In June–July, Captain Andrés Castillero reached the department with the Siete Leyes of 29 December 1836 and with news that the two Californias had been joined as one department. On 9 July 1837, at Santa Barbara, Alvarado swore those laws, dropped the style estado libre y soberano, and signed as governor of the Department of Alta California. The constituent congress resolved itself back into the diputación. As its senior vocal he became governor ad interim. Castillero was sent on to Mexico City for confirmation.

Independently, and before Mexico City knew of that oath, the ministry named Carlos Antonio Carrillo provisional governor on 6 June 1837. José Antonio Carrillo, who had obtained the appointment for his brother and already carried the papers, wrote to Alvarado from La Paz on 20 August. He addressed him as “My esteemed Bautista,” sent certified copies of the commission, argued that resistance to Mexican power was impracticable, said he had barely stopped a force of a thousand men, and held that a native ruler was the essential gain of 1836. Yield to Carlos, he wrote, and he himself would go back to Mexico for guarantees of pardon.

Los Angeles invited Carlos to make the pueblo his capital. He took the oath there on 6 December 1837; San Diego ratified him on the 9th. Norteños supporting Alvarado and Sureños supporting Carrillo clashed at San Buenaventura and at Las Flores in 1838. After Castillero reported the July submission, Mexico issued a general amnesty, confirmed Vallejo as comandante general, directed Alvarado as first vocal of the reinstated diputación to act as governor and to send a terna for the regular appointment, and authorized a Channel Island grant to the Carrillo brothers “in consideration of their patriotic services.”

On 25 February 1839, at Monterey, Alvarado installed the old diputación as the junta departamental. It divided the department into districts and voted a terna of Alvarado, Castro, and Pico. On 7 August 1839 President Bustamante named Alvarado gobernador propietario; he took that oath on 24 November 1839 and served until 31 December 1842.

== Governorship (1839 - 1842) ==
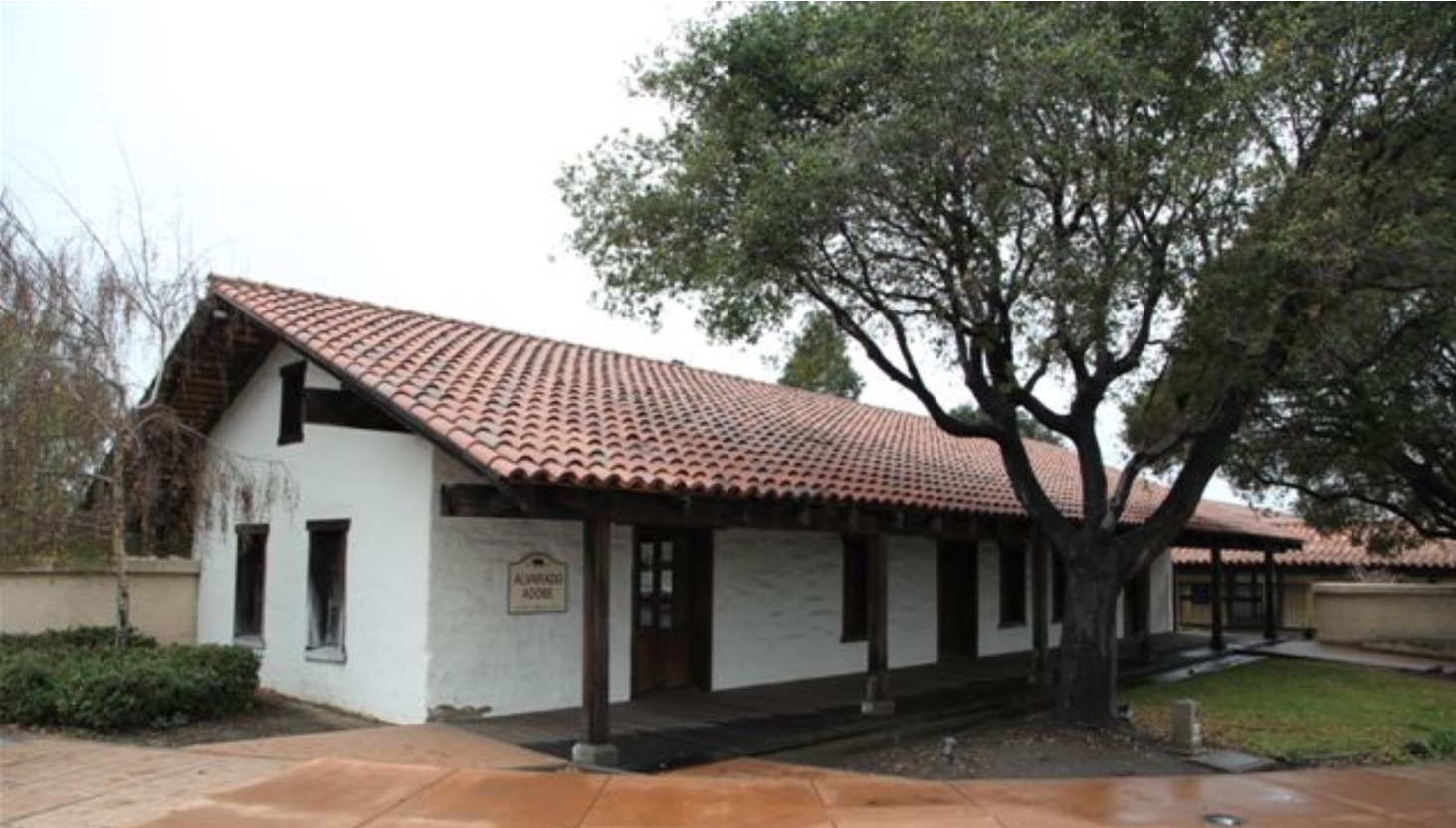
The Alvarado Adobe in San Pablo, California

Alvarado married Doña Martina Castro on 24 August 1839, in Santa Clara, but did not attend his own wedding having his half-brother, Jose Antonio Estrada, stand in for him. Though he claimed to be detained in Monterey on official business, it was rumored he was actually drunk and unable to function. After the wedding, Alvarado lived with his bride in Monterey, but kept a household nearby with mistress Raymunda.

The process of secularization of the missions was in its final stages, and it was at this time that Alvarado parceled out much of their land to prominent Californios via land grants. Though he took no land for himself, he did however, trade his Rancho El Sur to John B.R. Cooper in exchange for Rancho Bolsa del Potrero which he subsequently sold back to Cooper. He purchased Rancho El Alisal near Salinas in 1841 from his former tutor William Hartnell.

In April 1840 a report of a planned revolt against Alvarado by a group of foreigners, led by former ally Isaac Graham, caused the governor to order their arrest and deportation. They were sent to San Blas and held at Tepic. Through the British consul Barron most of the charges failed; nineteen of the exiles returned in 1841 Vallejo, Castro, and Alvarado asked Mexico for presidial reinforcements as overland immigration and talk of American annexation increased.

In response President Santa Anna sent Brigadier Manuel Micheltorena as governor, comandante general, and inspector, with a batallón fijo drawn largely from convicts. Before he reached Monterey, Commodore Thomas ap Catesby Jones seized the presidio in the belief that war had begun, then restored it. Alvarado handed the post over and withdrew to El Alisal; he would not resume the civil command and referred Jones to Micheltorena.

== Micheltorena affair ==
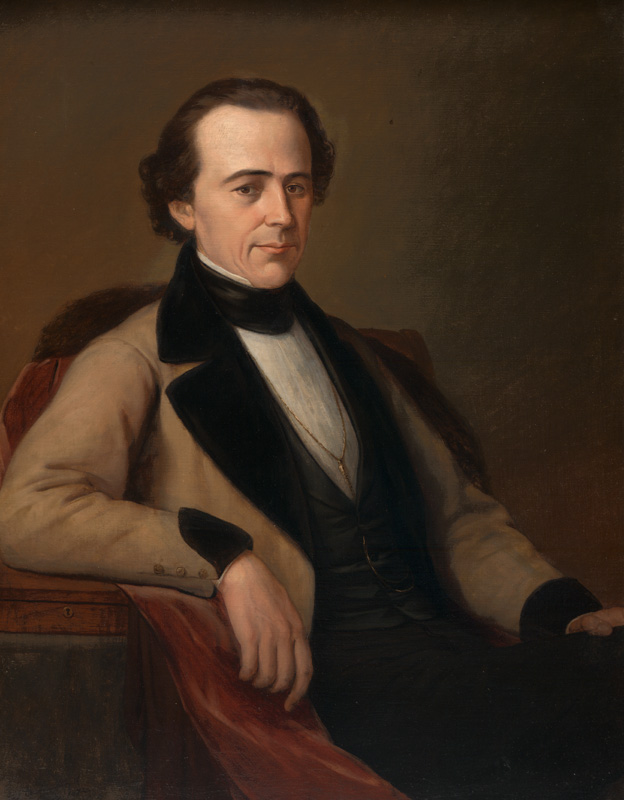
Manuel Micheltorena assumed power from Alvarado in 1842, amid tensions with the United States, but was later defeated by Alvarado and Castro at the Battle of Providencia in 1845.

Micheltorena took office at Los Angeles in December 1842 and moved north the next year. The conduct of the batallón turned Californios against him. Micheltorena himself was well received. He was educated, spoke well, opened schools with a departmental subsidy, and was liked by many of the larger rancheros and by the foreign merchants. He listened to complaints, paid for losses while he still had money, and had his men flogged when he deemed necessary In a dispatch to Mexico he admitted to the recruits' misconduct, but claimed that under his hand there had been no murder, no rape, and no serious robbery, and that the four hundred petty thefts complained of did not come to five hundred dollars.

Alvarado and the other leaders of the later rising put that record much higher. They wrote of an uncontrolled band of thieves and assassins and of a reign of terror in which “neither property, life, nor the honor of women” was safe. Historian Hubert Howe Bancroft treated those lines as the exaggerations of men looking for a reason to revolt. William Heath Davis, who was in California at the time, later wrote that Alvarado and Castro worked up “imaginary grievances.”

On 1 December, at Santa Teresa, after a brief skirmish between Micheltorena's forces and forces under Jose Castro and Alvarado, Micheltorena bound himself to send the worst of the batallón away. He did not keep the terms. He called John Sutter down from Nueva Helvetia with foreign riflemen and Indians. Alvarado and Castro then marched to Los Angeles. On 28 January 1845, Pío Pico, senior vocal, convened the junta departamental. The next day Alvarado and Castro laid before it an exposición: By breaking the treaty, arming foreigners and Indians, and by giving a high command to Sutter, who was already believed to have threatened Mexican authority, he had committed treason and should answer before the tribunals of the republic. The assembly, they wrote, should take charge of the department ad interim in accordance with the laws and ask Mexico to confer the command on a native.

A commission met Micheltorena at Santa Barbara on 7 February. He held that the junta had not been legally convened. On 14 February, on Pico’s motion, the junta resolved that Micheltorena’s authority be ignored that both the civic and military offices he had held be filled according to law and that formal accusations go to the supreme government. On the 15th Pico, as first vocal, was declared governor ad interim. Alvarado and Castro gave in their adhesion. The campaign ended at the Battle of Providencia in February 1845. Micheltorena embarked for San Blas with the batallón. Píco remained governor; Castro comandante general. Píco named Alvarado collector at Monterey.

== Conquest of California and later life ==
In 1843 he was commissioned colonel of the Defensores de la Patria, the departmental civic militia. In October 1845, at the last departmental election under Mexican rule, Alvarado was chosen diputado to Congress, with Manuel Requena as substitute. He did not take his seat. By December the war with the United States had closed the ports and Congress was dissolved.

When John C. Frémont entered the department in 1846 and the Bear Flag revolt followed, Castro called out the militia with Alvarado second in command. After John D. Sloat took Monterey, Alvarado went south with Castro. In mid-August a detachment of Frémont’s California Battalion took him near San Luis Obispo. He was paroled in September. Stephen W. Kearny later offered him office under the United States. He refused stating that he was a Mexican officer and still owed allegiance to Mexico.

He sold Rancho Las Mariposas and lived out his last years on his wife’s share of Rancho San Pablo through the land-commission suits that followed the Treaty of Guadalupe Hidalgo.

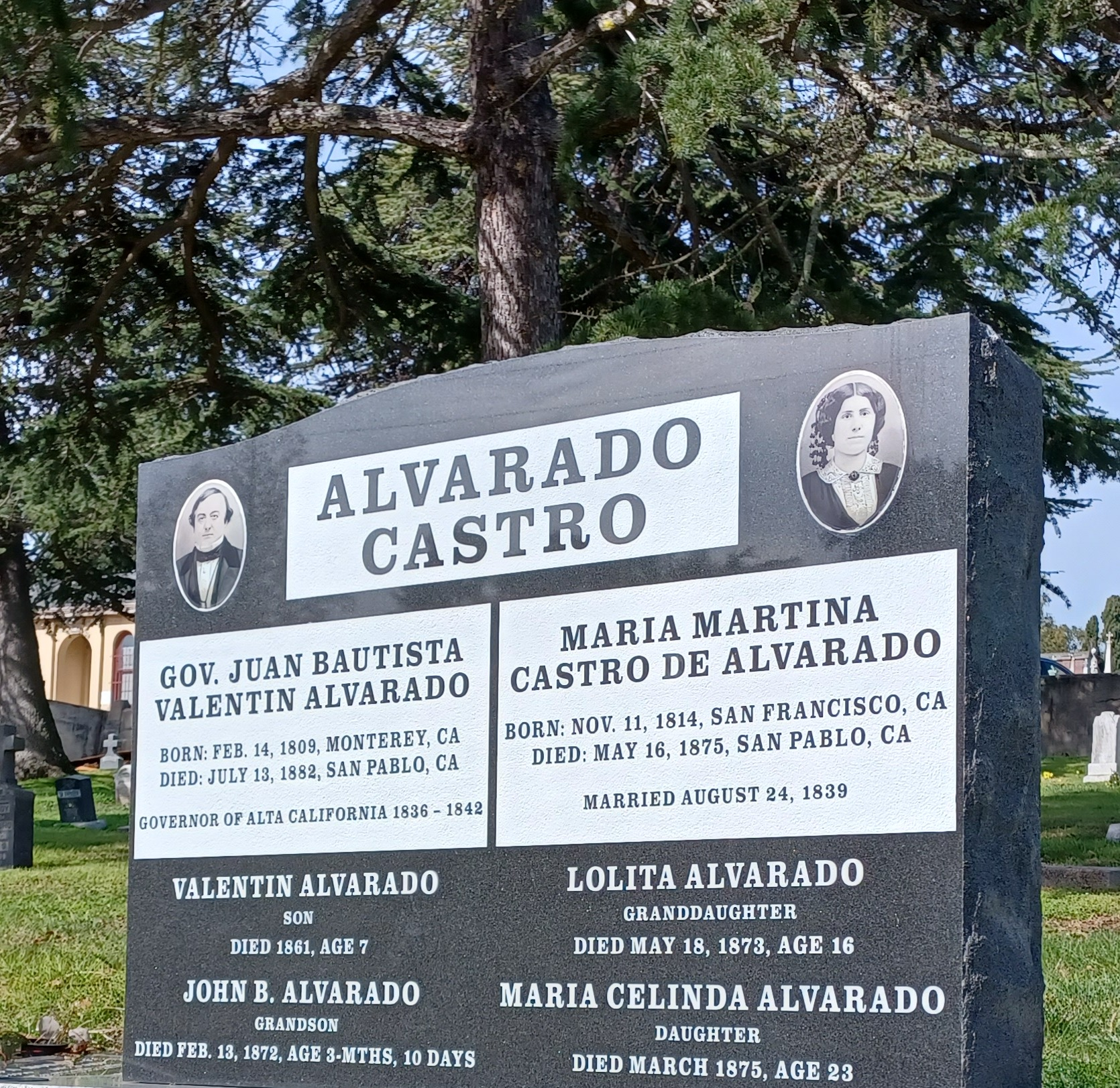
Funerary monument at St. Mary's Cemetery for Governor Alvarado and his wife, Martina Castro de Alvarado.

He did not participate in the California Gold Rush, instead concentrating his efforts on agriculture and business. He opened the Union Hotel on the rancho in 1860, but his businesses were mostly unsuccessful. After Martina's death in 1876, Alvarado wrote his Historia de California. He died on his ranch in 1882 and is buried at Saint Mary Cemetery in Oakland.Alvarado's adobe house, at the foot of Alvarado Street in downtown Monterey, survives as a California Historical Landmark. The former settlement of Alvarado (now part of Union City) was named after him, as was Alvarado Street in San Francisco's Noe Valley. Portions of the Rancho San Pablo adobe are incorporated into the current City of San Pablo government campus and Alvarado Park within Wildcat Canyon Regional Park is named in his honor.

== California Historical Landmark ==
The Governor Alvarado House is California Historical Landmark number #348.

California Historical Landmark reads:

NO. 348 HOUSE OF GOVERNOR ALVARADO - A native of Monterey, Alvarado served as Governor of Mexican California from December 20, 1836 to December 20, 1842. During his administration the increasing influx of Americans and the Russian settlement at Fort Ross began to be regarded as serious problems.

The adobe house, which is now occupied by a local bank branch, was seriously damaged in January, 2023, during the 2022–2023 California floods.

== See also ==
- California Historical Landmarks in Monterey County
- History of California through 1899
- Alvarado Adobe
- Revolts against the Centralist Republic of Mexico
- Río Arriba Rebellion

== Sources ==
- Maud Adamson (1931). The Land Grant System of Governor Juan B. Alvarado. Department of History, University of Southern California.
- Bancroft, Hubert Howe; Oak, Henry Lebbeus; Nemos, William; Victor, Frances Fuller (1884–1890). History of California. San Francisco: The History Company.
- Robert Ryal Miller (January 1999). Juan Alvarado: Governor of California, 1836-1842. University of Oklahoma Press. ISBN 978-0-8061-3101-6.
- "Juan Alvarado - Biographic Notes". Inn-California.
