= Battle of Providencia =

Part of California history (1845)

Coordinates: 34.180°N 118.328°W

Date	February 19–20, 1845
Location	Cahuenga Pass, Alta California, Centralist Mexico (now California, U.S.)
Result	Californio victory

Belligerents
Alta California	Centralist Mexico

Commanders and leaders
Juan Bautista Alvarado; José Antonio Castro	Manuel Micheltorena

Strength
N/A	N/A

The Battle of Providencia (also called the "Second Battle of Cahuenga Pass") took place in Cahuenga Pass in early 1845 on Rancho Providencia in the San Fernando Valley, north of Los Angeles, California. Native Californios successfully challenged Mexican forces regarding autonomy of Alta California.

== The conflict ==
Alta California, originally a province of New Spain, had been a territory under Mexican rule since 1822. As the native-born Californio population reached adulthood, many of them became impatient that the government of Mexico continued to choose non-native born governors. Following the Californio Juan Bautista Alvarado, the central government in 1842 appointed the Oaxaca-born Manuel Micheltorena as governor, who proved very unpopular. By 1844, a revolt against him arose, culminating in the Battle of Providencia.

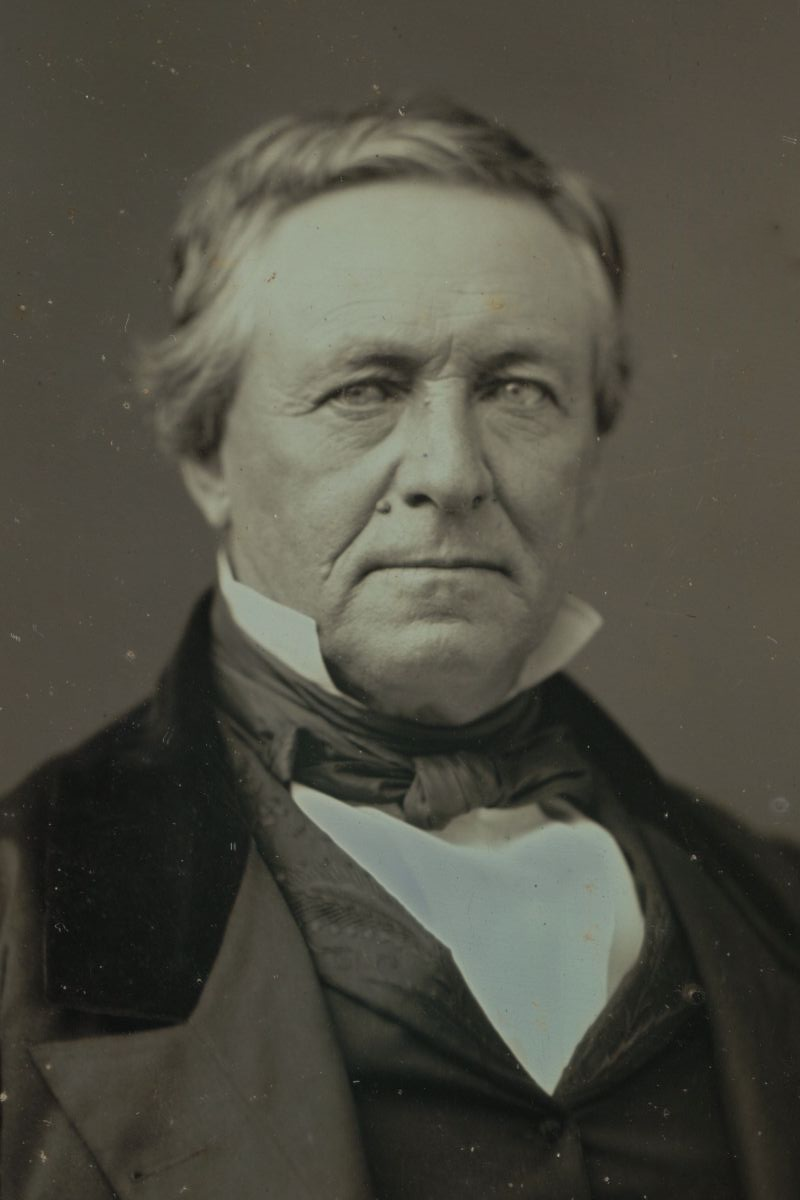
John Marsh. The Stone House of John Marsh still stands in Contra Costa County, California.

Micheltorena had been sent to California from Mexico, along with an army that had been recruited out of Mexico’s worst jails. He had no money to feed his army, which then spread out to people’s homes and farms “like a plague of locusts, stripping the countryside bare.” This enraged the Californians and led to widespread hatred of Micheltorena. Women were not considered safe from the depredations of Micheltorena’s army.

Juan Bautista Alvarado, the governor who had been forcibly replaced by Micheltorena, organized a revolt against Micheltorena. Upon learning of the impending revolt, Micheltorena appointed John Sutter to lead troops in opposition. Sutter came to John Marsh, who had one of the largest ranchos in California, hoping he would join. Marsh wanted no part of it, but Sutter forced him to join his army against his will.

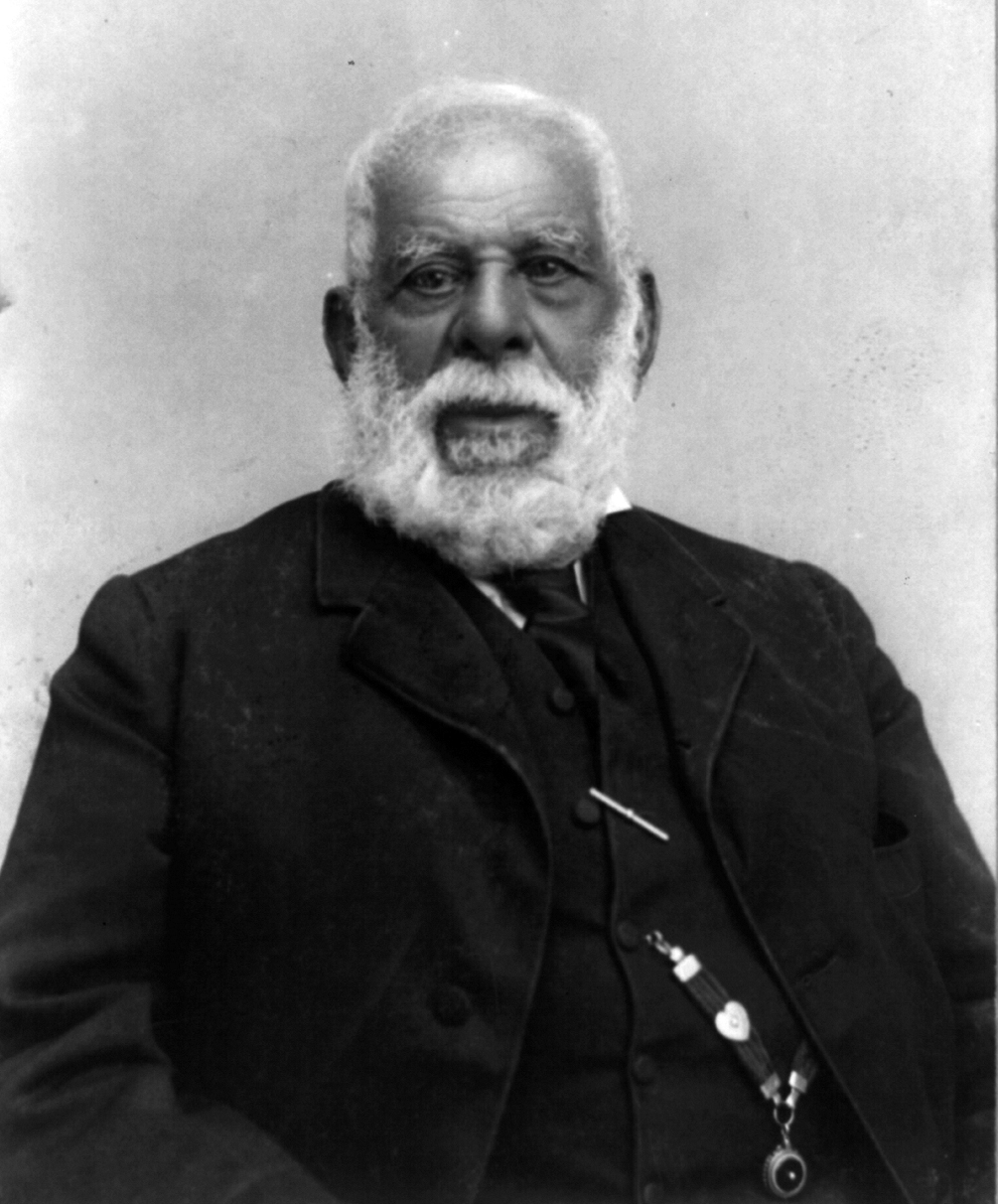
Pío de Jesús Pico in later life

The two forces met in Cahuenga Pass, near Los Angeles, and fought the Battle of Providencia (also known as the Second Battle of Cahuenga Pass). In spite of an extensive artillery barrage battle casualties were similarly slight as in the first Battle of Cahuenga Pass, being limited to one horse and one mule.

On the long march to the battle Marsh had taken every opportunity to dissuade the other soldiers from Micheltorena’s cause. Ignoring Sutter, Marsh seized an opportunity during the battle to signal the other side for a parley. Many of the soldiers on each side were settlers from the United States. Marsh convinced them that they had no reason to be fighting each other. At Marsh’s urging, these soldiers on both sides united, abandoned Micheltorena’s cause, and even captured Sutter. Micheltorena was defeated, and California-born Pío Pico was returned to the governorship.
