= Nicolás Gutiérrez =

American politician

Interim Governor of California
- In office 1 August 1836 – 3 November 1836
- Preceded by: Mariano Chico
- Succeeded by: José Castro (for 1 month)
- In office 2 January 1836 – 3 May 1836
- Preceded by: José Castro
- Succeeded by: Mariano Chico

Personal details
- Profession: Soldier

Lieutenant Colonel Nicolás Gutiérrez (Spanish pronunciation: [/nikoˈlaz ɣuˈtjereθ/] nee-ko-LAS goo-tee-YEH-res) was twice acting governor of the northern part of Las Californias (what had previously been Alta California) in 1836, from January to May and July to November.

Gutiérrez served two short terms as acting governor of Las Californias in 1836, during a very turbulent period in the history of Mexican California. The Siete Leyes reforms to Mexico's government had combined the two territories of Alta California and Baja California into a single departamento under the pre-1804 Spanish-era name of Las Californias. His term began on 2 January 1836, succeeding acting (ad interim) governor José Castro, and Gutiérrez served as governor ad interim until the arrival of official appointee Mariano Chico. Chico, however, was dismissed for abandoning his post, and Gutiérrez returned to the job in July.

Gutierrez himself was ousted in a coup led by Californios Juan Bautista Alvarado and José Castro, assisted by a group of foreigners led by Isaac Graham, on 5 November 1836.

The battle was short and surrender was secured after the firing of just one artillery round at the governor's residence in Monterey. Gutierrez and his cadre of officers were detained at Cabo San Lucas on the English brig Clementine before returning to Mexico.
