= Manuel Micheltorena =

Mexican politician (1804–1853)

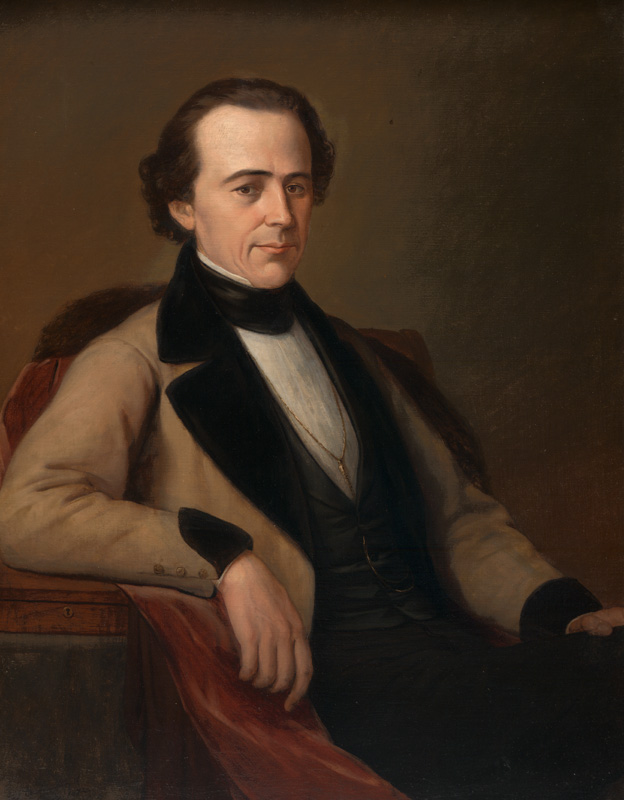

9th Governor of California
- In office 31 December 1842 – 22 February 1845
- Appointed by: Antonio López de Santa Anna
- Preceded by: Juan Bautista Alvarado
- Succeeded by: Pío Pico

Personal details
- Born: Joseph (José) Manuel María Joaquín Micheltorena y Llano; 8 June 1804 Oaxaca, New Spain
- Died: 7 September 1853 (aged 49) Mexico City, Mexico
- Profession: Politician, soldier

Military service
- Allegiance: Mexico
- Branch/service: Mexican infantry
- Rank: General
- Battles/wars: Alta California Revolt of 1845; Battle of Providencia; Mexican–American War; Battle of Buena Vista

Joseph Manuel María Joaquín Micheltorena y Llano (8 June 1804 – 7 September 1853) was a brigadier general and adjutant-general of the Mexican Army, governor of California, commandant-general and inspector of the department of Las Californias, then within Mexico. Micheltorena was the last non-Californian born Mexican governor, preceding the San Gabriel–born Pío Pico, the last provincial governor.

== Personal life ==
Micheltorena was born in 1804 in Oaxaca City, New Spain, into a prominent Basque family. His parents were Army Captain Joseph Eusebio Micheltorena (who in 1819 was included among a list of notable foreigners in Mexico), and Catarina Gertrudis Llano. He was baptized at five days old at Oaxaca Cathedral. His grandparents were Joseph de Micheltorena (Mitxeltorena) and María Encarnación de Herrera (paternal), and Joseph Augustín de Llano and María Romero (maternal).

== Career ==
Micheltorena was appointed governor of California by Mexican president Antonio López de Santa Anna, the territory's 9th, and served from 30 December 1842 until his ouster in 1845.

Micheltorena continued previous governors' policy of large land grants ("ranchos"), making 115 land grants in 1843 and 1844. He faced criticism, opposition, and eventually rebellion by the Californios who wanted local-born governors.

Micheltorena brought with him from Mexico a group of soldiers that included criminals, and who were derisively referred to by some as cholos, to enforce his policies. Micheltorena was defeated at the 1845 Battle of Providencia, left California, and was succeeded by Pío Pico as governor.

Micheltorena served as Brigadier-General, Chief of Staff to Antonio López de Santa Anna's Army of the North in the Mexican–American War in 1847. Micheltorena handled artillery at the Battle of La Angostura.
