= Sol N. Sheridan =

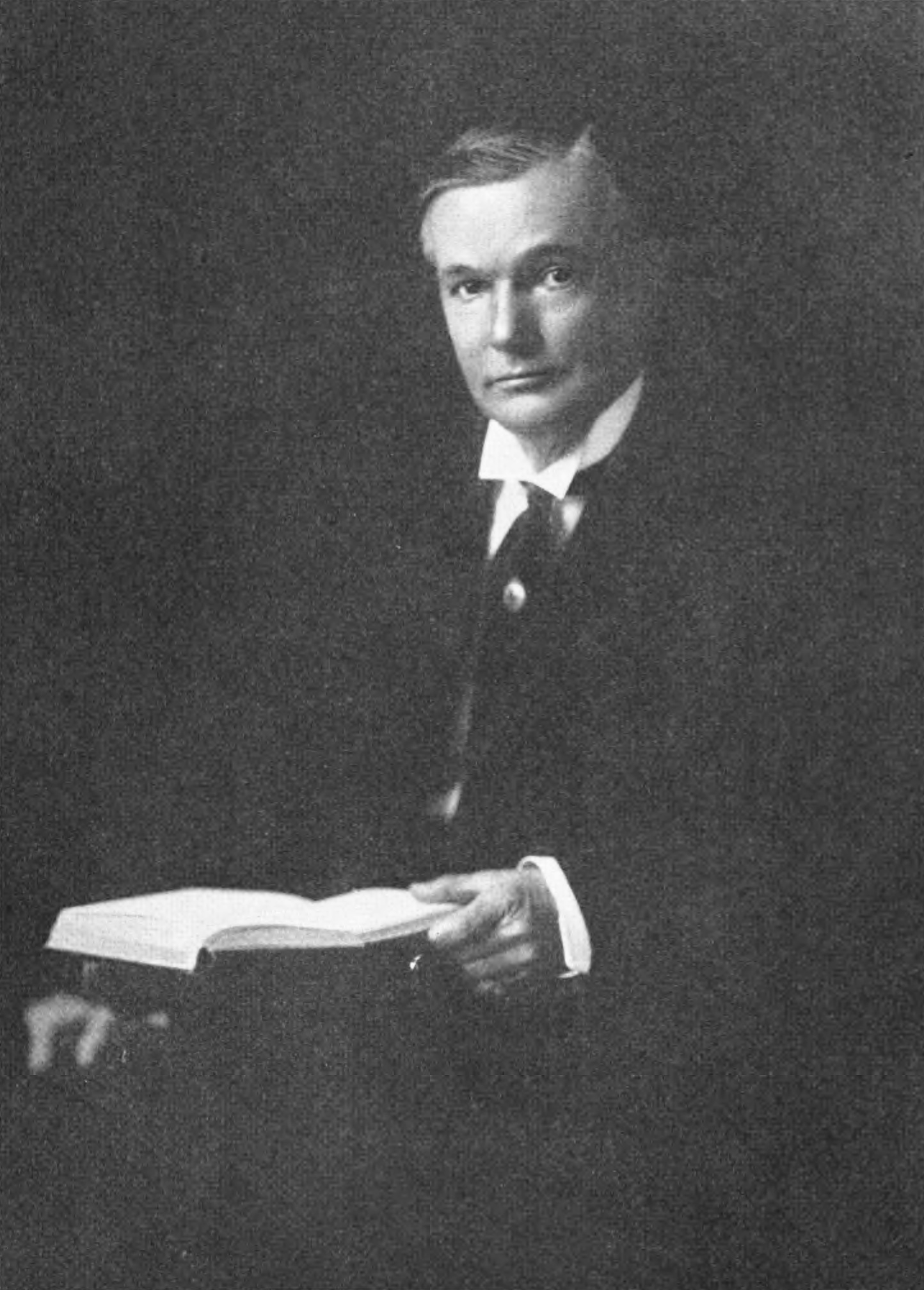
- Born: December 10, 1858; St. Joseph, Missouri
- Died: January 23, 1936 (aged 77); Ventura, California
- Occupations: Historian, newspaperman, author

Signature
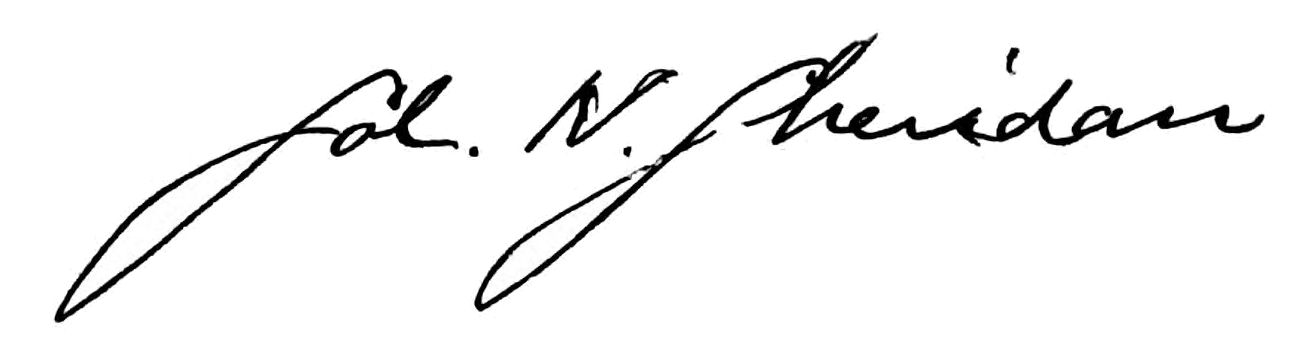

Solomon Neill Sheridan Jr. (December 10, 1858 – January 23, 1936) was an American historian, newspaperman, and writer.

== Early years ==
Sheridan was born in St. Joseph, Missouri, in 1858, the son of Solomon N. Sheridan and Anne Byrne Sheridan. He moved to Ventura, California, with his parents and six siblings in 1873.

== Newspaperman ==
Sheridan began working in the newspaper business for the Ventura Signal, which was owned by his brother E. M. Sheridan. He next moved to San Francisco and in 1882 became a correspondent for the San Francisco Chronicle in Washington, D.C. By 1890, he had moved to Arizona where he helped found The Arizona Republican.

In 1898, he was a war correspondent during the Spanish–American War, reporting from Guam and the Philippines as a correspondent for The San Francisco Call and the New York Herald. He was aboard the USS Charleston to report on the Spanish surrender at Guam. After the war, he traveled extensively through Asia and the Pacific and became the associate editor of the Pacific Commercial Advertiser in Honolulu.

== Political and civic efforts ==
Upon his return from Hawaii, Sheridan worked for two years as private secretary to U.S. Senator Frank Putnam Flint. While on Flint's staff, Sheridan served as secretary to the Senate Committee on Interoceanic Canals (of which Flint was chairman) and traveled to Panama during the construction of the Panama Canal and also along the west coast of Mexico.

Sheridan returned to Ventura where he became the secretary of the chamber of commerce, working to develop the Rincon Parkway and a harbor for Ventura. In 1913, he founded and served as curator of the Pioneer Museum at the Ventura County Courthouse. He was also the driving force behind the construction of the Maricopa Highway (now California State Route 33) going north from Ventura. The highway, finally completed in 1933, was considered a "crowning achievement" for Sheridan.

== Author ==
Sheridan was also an author. His "History of Ventura County, California" was published in 1926. He also wrote children's books, including "Billy Vanilla: A Story of the Snowbird Country" (Lothrop, Lee & Shepard 1919), "The Typhoon's Secret" (Doubleday, Page & Company 1920), and "The Little Spotted Seal" (Harper & Brothers 1929).

== Personal life and death ==
Sheridan did not marry. He took in three homeless boys, raising and educating them. In January 1936, Sheridan died at age 77 at Ventura's Foster Memorial Hospital. He was buried at the Ventura City Cemetery.

Sheridan's papers are maintained at the research library at The Museum of Ventura County.
