= Mariano Chico =

American politician

7th Governor of California
- In office April 1836 – July 1836
- President: Antonio López de Santa Anna
- Preceded by: Nicolás Gutiérrez
- Succeeded by: Nicolás Gutiérrez

Personal details
- Born: 1796
- Died: 1850 (aged 53–54)
- Profession: Soldier

Colonel Mariano Chico Navarro (1796–1850) served one of the briefest terms as Alta California governor from April 1836 to July 1836. He was both preceded and succeeded by the equally unpopular Lieutenant Colonel Nicolás Gutiérrez, who joined him in exile in Mexico on November 5, 1836, by a northern revolt.

== Sources ==
- Pourade, Richard F. The History of San Diego. San Diego, California: The San Diego Union.
- Killea; Lucy Lytle (October 1966). "Journal of San Diego History". San Diego Historical Society. sandiegohistory.org.
