= José Antonio Roméu =

Spanish soldier

José Antonio Romeu

6th Governor of the Californias
- In office 16 April 1791 – 9 April 1792
- Preceded by: Pedro Fages
- Succeeded by: José Joaquín de Arrillaga

Personal details
- Born: 1742?
- Died: 1792
- Profession: Soldier

José Antonio Roméu (1742? – 1792) was sixth Spanish governor of Alta California, from 1791 to 1792.

== Career ==
While serving as a captain in the Spanish army in 1782, José Antonio Roméu led a retaliatory action after the Quechan Yuma Massacre of 1781. In 1781, the Yuma tribe attacked and damaged the Spanish Arizona mission settlements of San Pedro y San Pablo de Bicuñer and Puerto de Purísima Concepción, killing Lieutenant Governor Fernando Rivera, the mission Father of the Arizona mission, and others. Roméu was the military leader on this action against the tribe. The Spanish were unable to defeat the Yuma, and the tribe remained in control of the land for the following seventy years. The event closed the Anza Trail, crippling the overland population growth of the Yum colony.

Pedro Fages stepped down as governor and departed Monterey, California in April 1791. The capital of Monterey also served as the main port of entry into California.

In 1791 Lieutenant Colonel José Antonio Roméu was asked to replace Fages. Roméu, his wife Doña Josefa, and daughter first travelled to Loreto, Baja California Sur arriving on March 17, 1791. In Baja his health turned poor. He had chest pains that caused difficulty sleeping and indigestion. Roméu arrived at Monterey in 1791, he was very ill and barely able to do his job. He led in a time of peace and worked well with the Spanish missions in California and Franciscan padres. During Roméu's tenure as governor, two missions were founded: Mission Santa Cruz (August 28, 1791) and Mission Nuestra Señora de la Soledad (October 9, 1791). By March 1792 he was bed ridden. He served just one year before dying on April 9, 1792. His funeral and burial interment were at Mission San Carlos Borromeo de Carmelo. In October 1792 his wife and daughter returned to Mexico.

== See also ==
- New Spain
- Las Californias
- Baja California
- History of California through 1899
- List of pre-statehood governors of California
