= Palóu Line =

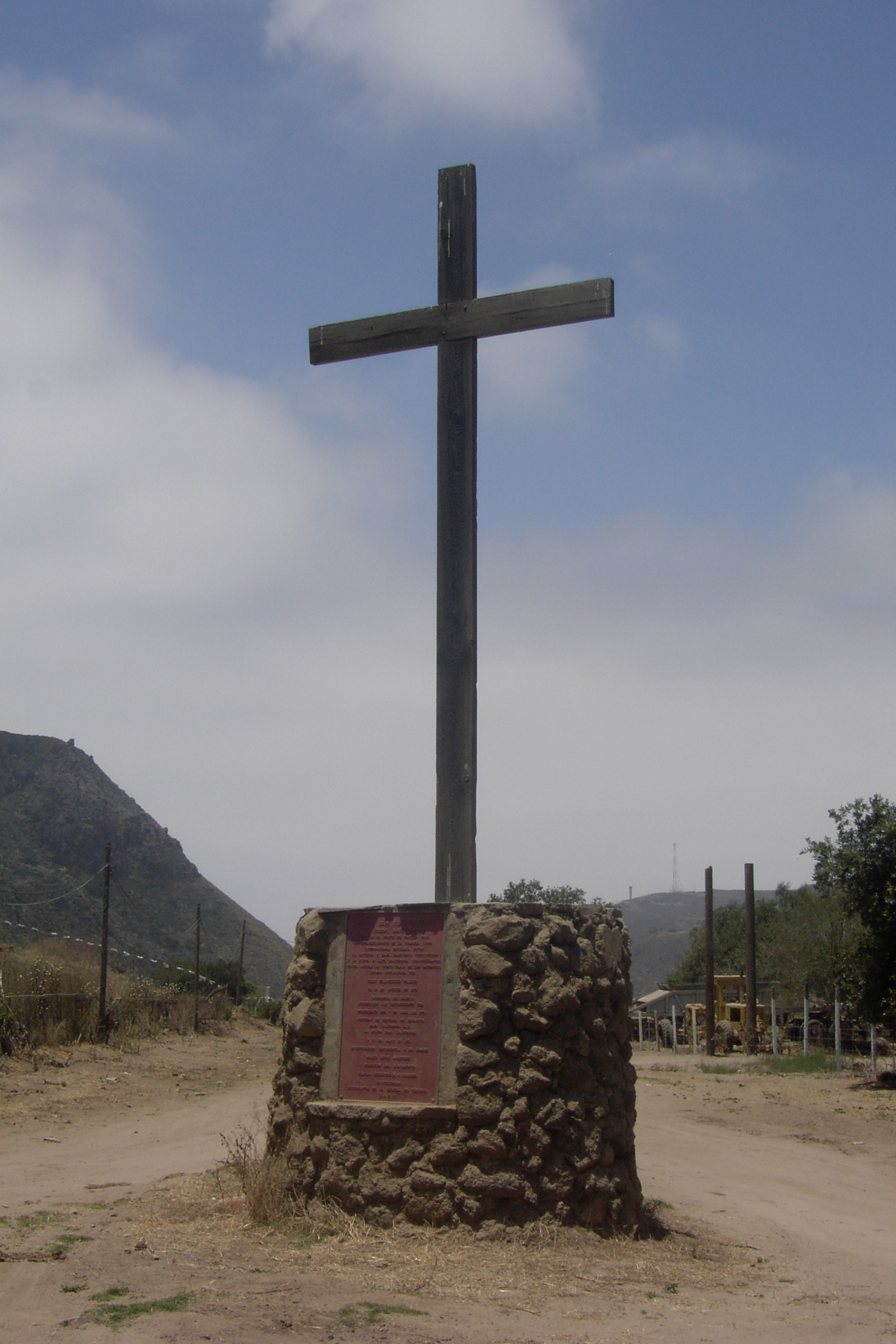
- Mesa del Descanso, latitude marker of the Palou Line.

Characteristics
- Entities: Baja California Alta California

History
- Established: 1773 (Catholic); 1804 (Political); To establish a jurisdictional boundary between Dominican and Franciscan missionary operations in the Californias.
- Disestablished: 1836; Codification of the Siete Leyes in the constitution of the Centralist Republic of Mexico.
- Notes: Demarcated by Francisco Palóu

The Palóu Line was the boundary between Alta California and Baja California, demarcated by Franciscan missionary, Francisco Palóu to distinguish Franciscan and Dominican areas of mission control during the Spanish colonial era.

== History ==
In 1772, Francisco Palóu was tasked with establishing a boundary between the Franciscan and Dominican orders in the Californias.

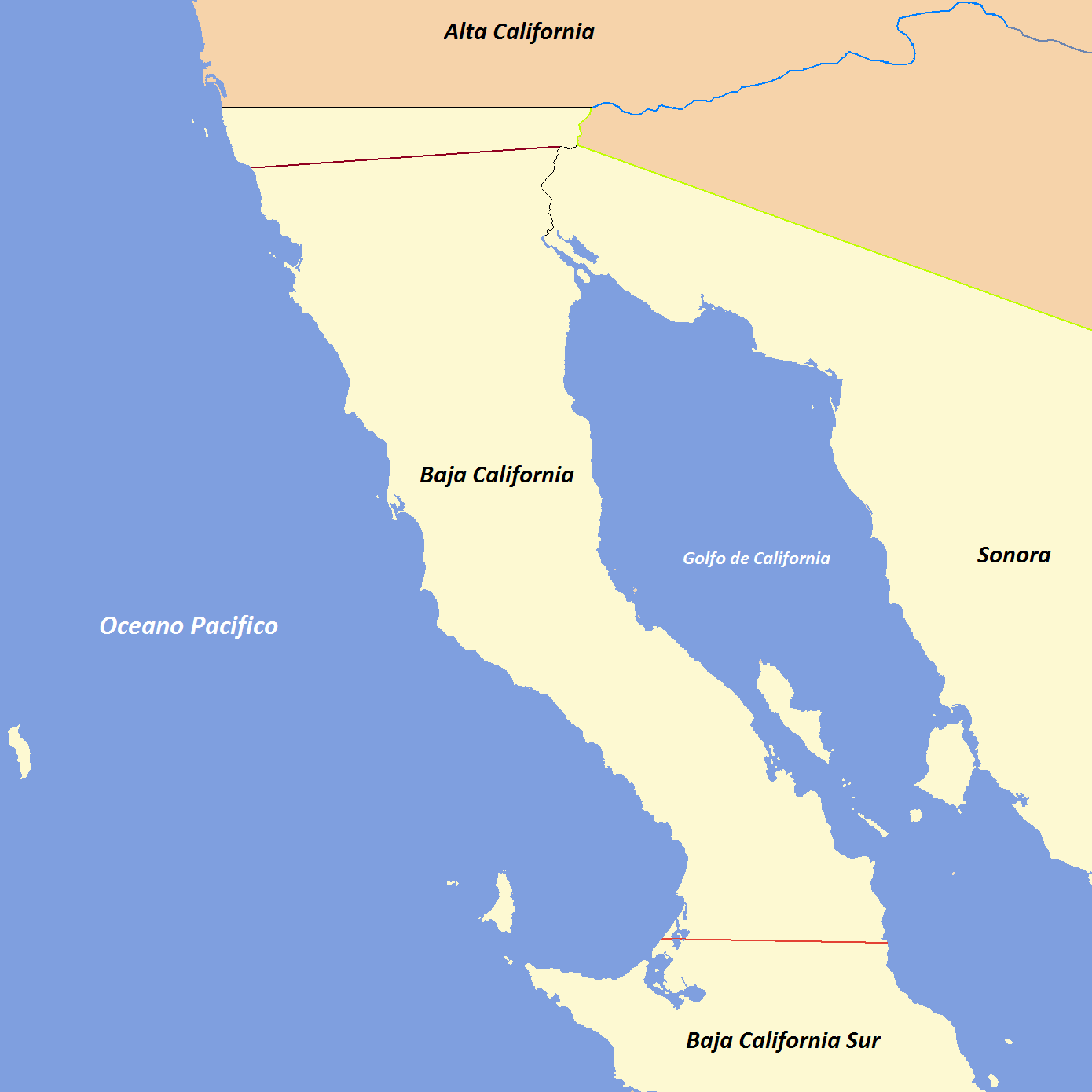
Evolution of the political boundaries of the Californias: Palóu Line (1804–1836) Gila River; border between Las Californias/Alta California and Sonora (1767–1847) Treaty of Guadalupe Hidalgo (1848–Present) Baja California Sur boundary (1931–Present)

The boundary between the Dominican Baja California missions and the Franciscan missions of Alta California was set in 1773. Palou erected a large cross on a rock called "Mesa del Descanso", which would mark the latitude towards the Colorado River, establishing the jurisdictional boundary between the Dominican and Franciscan missionary operations. The boundary marker is located north of the Misión San Miguel Arcángel de la Frontera, with the inscription on the boundary marker translated from Spanish stated:

San Juan Bautista Creek: Juan Crespí, May 1 for the setting of the first international division line between Old or Lower California (Dominicans) and New or Upper California (Franciscans) five leagues to the north (Valley of the Médanos) being established by: Priest Francisco Palóu on 19 August 1773 (Mojonera of Palou) in compliance with the instructions put forth on the April 7, 1772 Concordato.

—
Rosarito Historical Society, Baja California A.C. at The Mission, Baja California, on 20 May 1990. Fieldwork and research: . Monument donation: Mario Reyes Coronado De Villasari & family . Construction: Students of the School of Tourism at U.A.B.C.(Autonomous University of Baja California)

Due to the growth of the Hispanic population in the Californias in the late 1700s, the Diego de Borica administration started defining the Palóu Line as the division between Baja California and Alta California. It was under the José Joaquín de Arrillaga administration in 1804, when the boundary became the political reality. The province of Las Californias, then a part of the Commandancy General of the Internal Provinces, was divided into two separate territorial administrations following Palóu's division between the Dominican and Franciscan missions, creating the new territories of Baja California and Alta California. Arrillaga was then appointed as the first governor of Alta California.

The codification of the Siete Leyes amendments to the Mexican Constitution of would dissolve the boundary between Baja California and Alta California as they would merge to become the Department of the Californias.

After the Treaty of Guadalupe Hidalgo, a new border would be set between Baja California and Alta California, shifting the border north of the Palóu line to become the US-Mexican border between the US state of California and the Mexican state of Baja California. Granting land formerly administered by Alta California where the modern day cities of Tijuana, Mexicali, and Tecate are located, to Baja California's administration.
