= Alta California =

Former province of New Spain and Mexico

- Province of the Viceroyalty of New Spain (1804–1821); Province of the Mexican Empire (1821–1824); Federal territory of Mexico (1824–1836)
- 1804–1836
- Flag

- Capital: Monterey (1804–1836)
- Demonym: Californio
- Government
- Governor
  - 1804–1814: José Joaquín de Arrillaga (first Spanish governor)
  - 1815–1822: Pablo Vicente de Solá (last Spanish governor)
  - 1822–1825: Luis Antonio Argüello (first Mexican governor)
  - 1836: Nicolás Gutiérrez (last Alta Californian governor)
- Legislature: Diputación de Alta California
- Historical era: Spanish colonial era
  - Las Californias: 1769
  - Established: 1804
  - Treaty of Córdoba: August 24, 1821
  - Disestablished: 1836
Preceded by	Succeeded by
Province of the Californias	Department of the Californias
- Today part of: United States; Arizona; California; Colorado; Nevada; Utah; Wyoming

Alta California (Spanish pronunciation: [ˌalta kaliˈfoɾnja]; English: Upper California), also known as Nueva California (English: New California) among other names, (Note: California Septentrional ('Northern California'), California del Norte ('North California') or California Superior ('Upper California') were unofficial names.) was a province of New Spain formally established in 1804. Along with the Baja California peninsula, it had previously comprised the province of Las Californias, but was made a separate province in 1804 (named Nueva California). Following the Mexican War of Independence, it became a territory of Mexico in April 1822 and was renamed Alta California in 1824.

The territory included all of the present-day U.S. states of California, Nevada, and Utah, and parts of Arizona, Wyoming, and Colorado. The territory was re-combined with Baja California (as a single departamento) in Mexico's 1836 Siete Leyes (Seven Laws) constitutional reform, granting it more autonomy. That change was undone in 1846, but rendered moot by the outcome of the Mexican–American War in 1848, when most of the areas formerly comprising Alta California were ceded to the U.S. in the treaty which ended the war. In 1850, California joined the U.S. as the 31st state.

Spanish soldiers, settlers, and missionaries invaded the homelands of the indigenous peoples of California, people of the Great Basin, and the Pueblo peoples in the establishment of Alta California.

Evidence of Alta California remains in the numerous Spanish place names of American cities such as Monterey, Las Vegas, Los Angeles, Sacramento, San Bernardino, San Diego, San Francisco, San Jose, Santa Ana, and Santa Rosa.

== History ==
=== Plans for colonization (1697–1769) ===
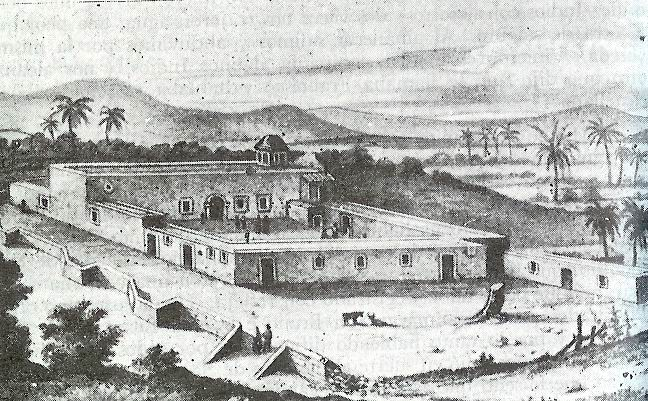
Misión de Nuestra Señora de Loreto Conchó was the first mission established in the Californias (present-day Loreto, Mexico) in 1697.

Father Eusebio Kino missionized the Pimería Alta from 1687 until his death in 1711. In 1697, a Jesuit expansion into California was funded and the Misión de Nuestra Señora de Loreto Conchó was established that same year. Plans in 1715 by Juan Manuel de Oliván Rebolledo resulted in a 1716 decree for extension of the conquest (of Baja California) which came to nothing. Juan Bautista de Anssa proposed an expedition from Sonora in 1737 and the Council of the Indies planned settlements in 1744, although these plans did not take action.

Don Fernando Sánchez Salvador researched the earlier proposals and suggested the area of the Gila and Colorado Rivers as the locale for forts or presidios preventing the French or the English from "occupying Monterey and invading the neighboring coasts of California which are at the mouth of the Carmel River." Alta California was not easily accessible from New Spain: land routes were cut off by deserts and Indigenous peoples who were hostile to invasion. Sea routes ran counter to the southerly currents of the distant northwestern Pacific. Ultimately, New Spain did not have the economic resources nor population to settle such a far northern outpost.

Spanish interest in colonizing Alta California was revived under the visita of José de Gálvez as part of his plans to completely reorganize the governance of the Interior Provinces and push Spanish settlement further north. In subsequent decades, news of Russian colonization and maritime fur trading in Alaska, and the 1768 naval expedition of Pyotr Krenitsyn and Mikhail Levashov alarmed the Spanish government and served to justify Gálvez's vision.

=== Spanish colonization (1769–1821) ===
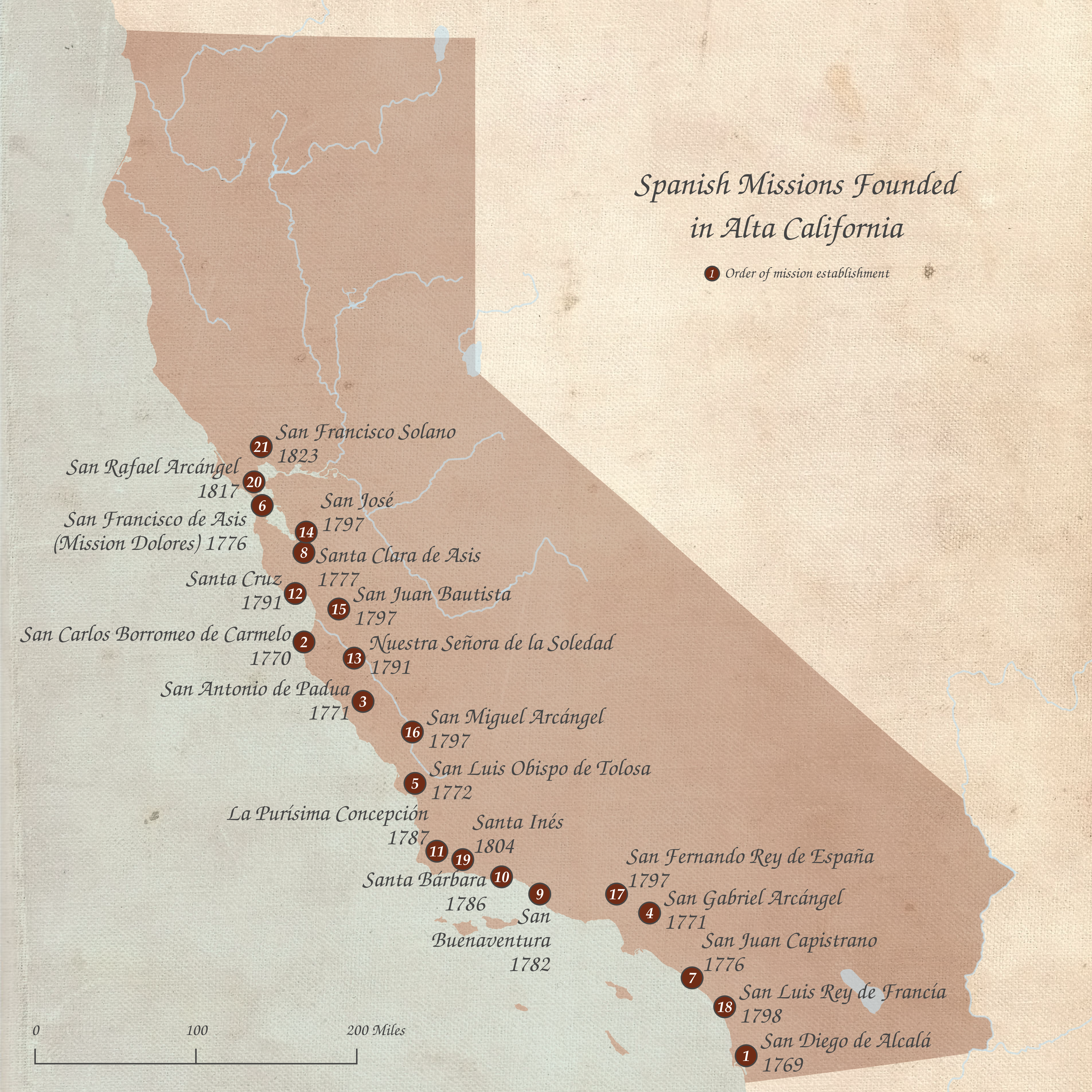
The 21 Spanish missions in Alta California (outline of the present state of California).

The Portolá expedition was the first European land-entry expedition into the area that is now California. The missionaries and soldiers encountered numerous Indigenous peoples of the area, who became the primary subjects of the expanding Jesuit and Franciscan missions that were already established in Baja California and Baja California Sur. The expedition first established the Presidio of San Diego at the site of the Kumeyaay village of Kosa'aay, which became the first European settlement in the present state of California. At first contact, the villagers provided food and water for the expedition, who were suffering from scurvy and water deprivation.

The first Alta California mission was founded that same year adjacent to the village Mission San Diego de Alcalá, founded by the Franciscan friar Junípero Serra and Gaspar de Portolá in San Diego in 1769. Similar to the site of this mission, subsequent missions and presidios were often founded at the site of Indigenous villages. Mission San Gabriel Arcángel was founded at the Tongva village Toviscanga and the Pueblo de Los Ángeles at the village of Yaanga. The first settlers of Los Angeles were African and mulatto Catholics, including at least ten of the recently re-discovered Los Pobladores. Mission San Juan Capistrano was founded at the Acjachemen village of Acjacheme. Mission San Fernando was founded at Achooykomenga.

As the Spanish and civilian settlers further intruded into Indigenous lands and imposed their practices, ideas of property, and religion onto them backed by the force of soldiers and settlers, Indigenous peoples formed rebellions on Spanish missions and settlements. A major rebellion at Mission San Gabriel in 1785 was led by the medicine woman Toypurina. Runaways from the missions were common, where abuse, malnourishment, and overworking were common features of daily life. Runaways would sometimes find shelter at more distant villages, such as a group of runaways who found refuge at the Vanyume village of Wá'peat, the chief of which refused to give them up. Many children died young at the missions. One missionary reported that 3 of every 4 children born at Mission San Gabriel died before reaching the age of two.

The precolonial Indigenous population of California is estimated to have numbered around 340,000 people, who were diverse culturally and linguistically. From 1769 to 1832, at least 87,787 baptisms and 63,789 deaths of Indigenous peoples occurred, demonstrating the immense death rate at the missions in Alta California. Conversion to Christianity at the colonial missions was often resisted by Indigenous peoples in Alta California. Many missionaries in the province wrote of their frustrations with teaching Indigenous people to internalize Catholic scripture and practice. Many Indigenous people learned to navigate religious expectations at the missions with complex social behaviors in order to maintain their cultural and religious practices.

==== Establishment of ranchos ====
In 1784, the Spanish established the first rancho, Rancho San Pedro, as a 48,000-acre site for cattle grazing. Nine ranchos were subsequently established before 1800. Spanish, and later Mexican, governments rewarded retired soldados de cuera with large land grants, known as ranchos, for the raising of cattle and sheep. Hides and tallow from the livestock were the primary exports of California until the mid-19th century. Similar to the missions, the construction, ranching and domestic work on these vast estates was primarily done by Indigenous peoples, who learned to speak Spanish and ride horses. Under Spanish and Mexican rule, the ranchos prospered and grew. Rancheros (cattle ranchers) and pobladores (townspeople) evolved into the unique Californio culture.

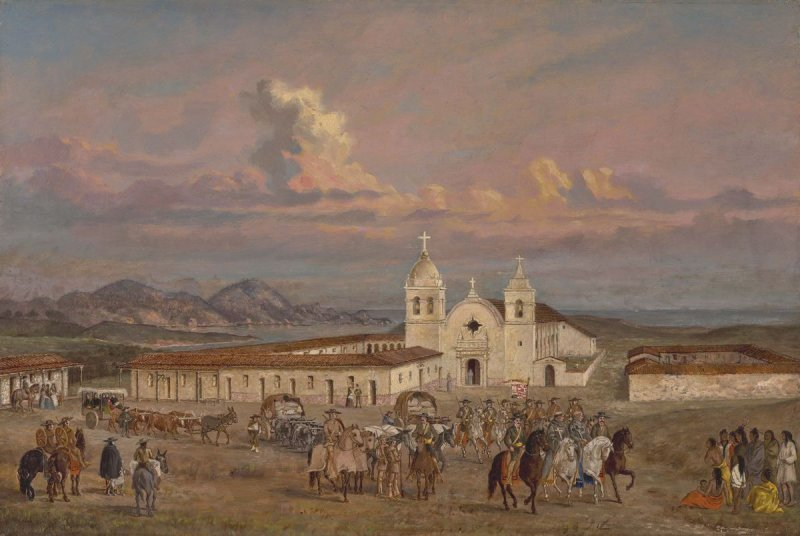
Mission San Carlos Borromeo de Carmelo, established in 1770, was the headquarters of the Californian mission system from 1797 until 1833.

By law, mission land and property were to pass to the Indigenous population after a period of about ten years, when the Indigenous people would become Spanish subjects. In the interim period, the Franciscans were to act as mission administrators who held the land in trust for the Indigenous residents. The Franciscans, however, prolonged their control over the missions even after control of Alta California passed from Spain to independent Mexico, and continued to run the missions until they were secularized, beginning in 1833. The transfer of property never occurred under the Franciscans.

As the number of Spanish settlers grew in Alta California, the boundaries and natural resources of the mission properties became disputed. Conflicts between the Crown and the Church arose over land. State and ecclesiastical bureaucrats debated over authority of the missions. The Franciscan priests of Mission Santa Clara de Asís sent a petition to the governor in 1782 which stated that the Mission Indians owned both the land and cattle and represented the Ohlone against the Spanish settlers in nearby San José. The priests reported that Indians' crops were being damaged by the pueblo settlers' livestock and that the settlers' livestock was also "getting mixed up with the livestock belonging to the Indians from the mission" causing losses. They advocated that the Indigenous people be allowed to own property and have the right to defend it.

==== Province of Alta California ====
In 1804, due to the growth of the Spanish population in new northern settlements, the province of Las Californias was divided just south of San Diego, following mission president Francisco Palóu's division between the Dominican and Franciscan jurisdictions. Governor Diego de Borica is credited with defining the border between Alta (upper) and Baja (lower) California's as Palóu's division, while the division became the political reality under José Joaquín de Arrillaga, who would become the first governor of Alta California.

The cortes (legislature) of New Spain issued a decree in 1813 for at least partial secularization that affected all missions in America and was to apply to all outposts that had operated for ten years or more; however, the decree was never enforced in California.

The Adams–Onís Treaty of 1819, between the United States and Spain, established the northern limit of Alta California at latitude 42°N, which remains the boundary between the states of California, Nevada and Utah (to the south) and Oregon and Idaho (to the north) to this day. Mexico won independence in 1821, and Alta California became a territory of Mexico the next year.

=== Independent Mexico (1821–1846) ===
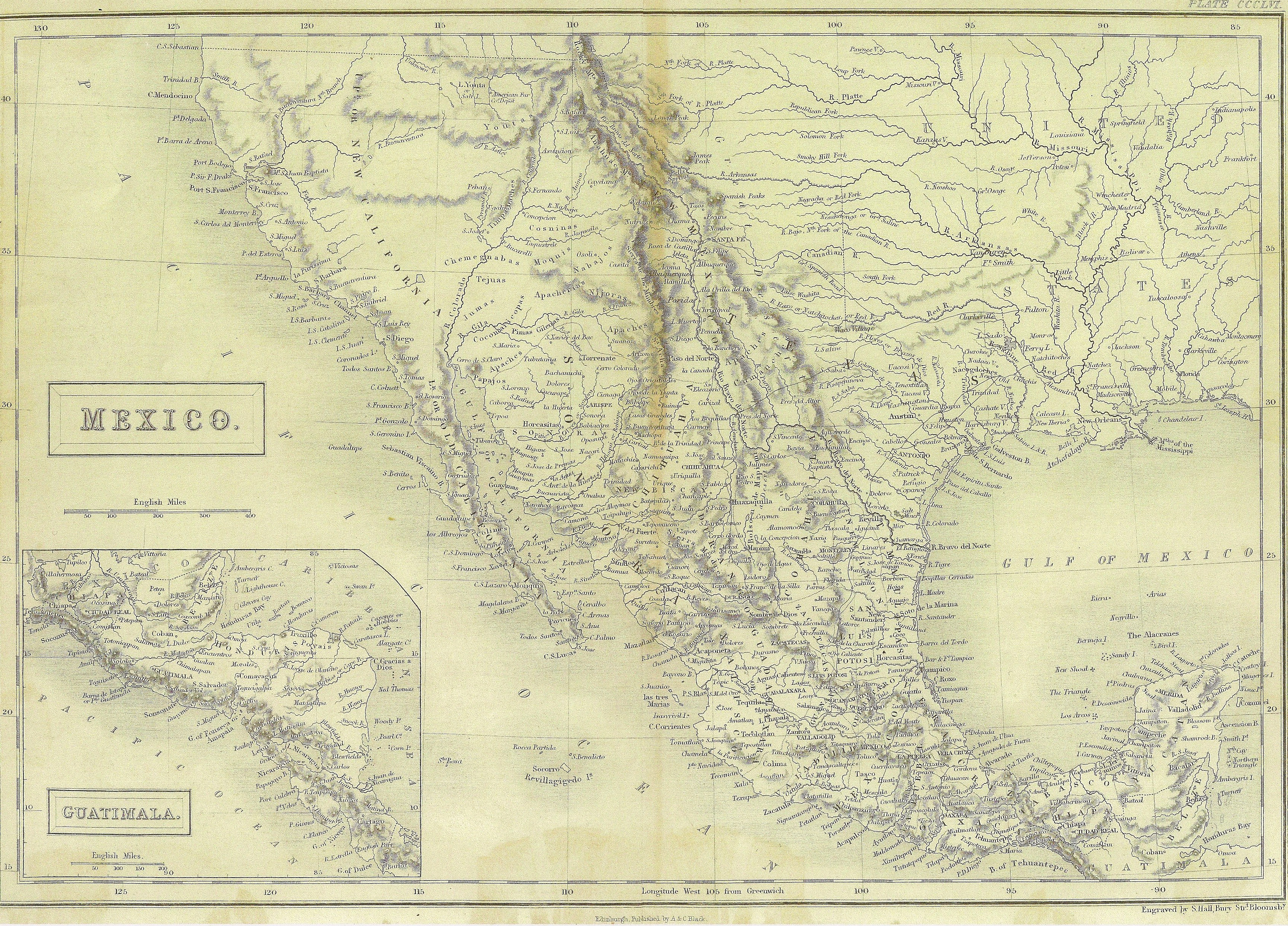
Mexico in 1838. From Britannica 7th edition.

Mexico gained independence from Spain on August 24, 1821, upon conclusion of the decade-long Mexican War of Independence. As the successor state to the Viceroyalty of New Spain, Mexico automatically included the provinces of Alta California and Baja California as territories. Alta California declared allegiance to the new Mexican nation and elected a representative to be sent to Mexico City. On November 9, 1822, the first legislature of California was created, the Diputación de Alta California. With the establishment of a republican government in 1824, Alta California, like many northern territories, was not recognized as one of the constituent States of Mexico because of its small population. The 1824 Constitution of Mexico refers to Alta California as a "territory".

==== Secularization of the missions (1833) ====
Resentment was increasing toward appointed territorial governors sent from Mexico City, who came with little knowledge of local conditions and concerns. Laws were imposed by the central government without much consideration of local conditions, such as the Mexican secularization act of 1833, causing friction between governors and the people.

In 1836, Mexico repealed the 1824 federalist constitution and adopted a more centralist political organization (under the "Seven Laws") that reunited Alta and Baja California in a single California Department (Departamento de las Californias). The change, however, had little practical effect in far-off Alta California. The capital of Alta California remained Monterey, as it had been since the 1769 Portola expedition first established a military/civil government, and the local political structures were unchanged.

==== California revolt of 1836 ====
The Centralist Republic with the separatist movements generated by the dissolution of the Federal Republic. The revolt in Las Californias (top far left, orange) was in 1836. Area in rebellion Area claimed by the Republics of Texas and the Rio Grande Area not in rebellion

The friction came to a head in 1836, when Monterey-born Juan Bautista Alvarado led a revolt against the 1836 constitution, seizing control of Monterey from Nicolás Gutiérrez. Alvarado's actions nearly led to a civil war with loyalist forces based in Los Angeles, but a ceasefire was arranged. After an unsettled period, Alvarado agreed to support the 1839 constitution, and Mexico City appointed him to serve as governor from 1837 to 1842. Other Californio governors followed, including Carlos Antonio Carrillo, and Pío Pico. The last non-Californian governor, Manuel Micheltorena, was driven out after another rebellion in 1845. Micheltorena was replaced by Pío Pico, last Mexican governor of California, who served until 1846 when the U.S. military occupation began.

==== Early American interest in Alta California ====
Date	Timeline of events through 1841
1816	Thomas W. Doak from Boston became the first Anglo-American to settle in Spanish California after arriving in Monterey Bay aboard his ship, the Albatross. He was baptized at San Carlos Mission in 1816 as Felipe Santiago and was employed at San Juan Bautista Mission in 1818.
09 Apr 1822	At the Governor's Hall in Monterey, a Californio Committee voted in favor of joining the newly independent First Mexican Empire ruled by Emperor Iturbide in Mexico City.
1823	British-American John Rogers Cooper settled in Mexican California, arriving in Monterey Bay aboard his ship, the Rover. He was the half-brother of Thomas O. Larkin.
04 Oct 1824	Mexico dissolved its monarchy and formed the First Mexican Republic. The new 1824 Mexican Constitution split Las Californias into two provinces, Alta and Baja California, at the Palóu Line.
27 Nov 1826	American fur trapper Jedediah Smith arrived at San Gabriel Mission. Smith's party became the first Anglo-Americans to travel into California via a land trail from the U.S. He was detained and jailed in San Diego by Governor Echeandía for illegal entry into Alta California. Echeandía ordered him to leave the same way he came to California. Smith, however, traveled into the California Central Valley looking for the fabled Buenaventura River. Smith eventually left through Ebbetts Pass in spring 1827, becoming the first non-native to cross the Sierra Nevada mountain range.
19 Sep 1827	Jedediah Smith, leading a second California expedition, arrived at Mission San José. He rendezvoused with his men after a Native American attack in the Mojave Desert. He was again arrested by Governor Echeandía for illegal entry and again released, after several English-speaking California residents vouched for him. Smith was ordered to leave and never return to California. Smith remained in California for months exploring the northern Sacramento Valley and left California into Oregon Country.
12 Jan 1828	The 1828 Treaty of Limits was concluded at Mexico City. The treaty recognized the Mexico–U.S. boundary that had been established by the 1819 Adams–Onís Treaty between Spain and the U.S.
1829	Abel Stearns, an American trader, settled in the Pueblo de Los Angeles in 1829 and became a major landowner and cattle rancher and one of the area's wealthiest citizens.
31 Jan 1830	Antonio Armijo arrived at San Gabriel Mission, establishing a land route between the Mexican provinces of New Mexico and Alta California. His route, the southernmost and most direct, was known as the Armijo Route of the Old Spanish Trail.
11 July 1830	American fur trapper Ewing Young, who had followed Jedediah Smith's trail, arrived at Mission San José after a Mexican official who encountered him trapping in the Central Valley summoned him there. Young sold his fur pelts in San Francisco and Los Angeles, later returning to Taos, New Mexico, after his fur trading made him one of the wealthiest Americans in Mexican territory.
early 1831	William Wolfskill, with a party of mountain men that included George C. Yount, arrived in Southern California using Jedediah Smith's trail across the Mojave Desert, having left Taos, New Mexico, in September 1830. Later, after time spent hunting sea otters on the coast, Wolfskill returned to Southern California, while Yount decided to go north, and the two parted company. Yount settled in the Napa Valley.
Apr 1832	Thomas O. Larkin settled in Alta California. His elder half-brother, pioneer businessman John Rogers Cooper, had invited Larkin to join him, propelling Larkin to success and wealth. Larkin served as the only U.S. consul to Alta California during the Mexican era and was covertly involved in U.S. plans to annex California from Mexico.
1833	Bent's Fort was built on the Mexico-U.S. border adjacent to the Arkansas River. The fort was the only major Anglo-American permanent settlement on the Santa Fe Trail between Missouri and the Mexican settlements. It was destroyed in 1849.
Fall 1833	Benjamin Bonneville led a U.S. expedition to the Great Salt Lake area. He dispatched Joseph R. Walker to lead an auxiliary expedition into California, where he reached Half Moon Bay on November 20. Walker discovered a route along the Humboldt River across present-day Nevada, as well as Walker Pass across the Sierra Nevada. The path later became known as the California Trail, the primary route for immigrants into California.
14 Feb 1834	Joseph Walker party left California after camping for the winter under the authorization of California Governor José Figueroa. The Walker party rendezvoused with Bonneville in Utah, reaching him on July 12.
13 Apr 1834	Thomas O. Larkin's son, Thomas Oliver, Jr., was born in Monterey, the first child of U.S. parents born in California. The mother of the child, Rachel Hobson Holmes, was the first American woman to live in California.
06 Aug 1835	U.S. President Andrew Jackson sent Anthony Butler to Mexico City to negotiate the purchase of the Mexican provinces of Texas, New Mexico, and Alta California, which the Mexican government refused. Jackson attempted to buy California two more times.
15 Dec 1835	General Antonio López de Santa Anna took power in a coup and turned Mexico into a unitary state. Alta California and Baja California territories were merged as the Department of Las Californias as part of the reforms made under Las Siete Leyes, formalized under Santa Anna.
03 Nov 1836	California interim Governor Nicolás Gutiérrez, who had been sent directly from the centralist Mexican government, was ousted by local Californians after one cannon was fired. Californio Juan Bautista Alvarado was installed in his place by local Californians.
07 Nov 1836	Led by Juan Bautista Alvarado, a Californio independence movement against Centralist Mexico declared the independence of Alta California. Alvarado stated that Alta California was free and would sever her relations with Mexico until she ceased to be oppressed. A negotiated settlement led to Mexico's California territory becoming two departments, thus giving more autonomy to Californios. Mexico mandated that Alvarado remain governor of Alta California.
17 Jan 1837	Mexican President Antonio López de Santa Anna arrived in Washington D.C., after his liberation by Texian General Sam Houston, to request the mediation of the United States between Texas and Mexico. In expectation of his request, or after it was made, Jackson had drawn up the general terms upon which the U.S. government would assume the undertaking, in exchange for the sale by Mexico to the U.S. of a large amount of Mexican territory.
Aug 1839	John Sutter began building Sutter's Fort on the bank of the American River near Sacramento. In the 1840s, Sutter's Fort became the largest concentration of Anglo-Americans in Mexican California.
1839	Governor Alvarado decreed that all foreigners who did not become Mexican citizens would be expelled from Alta California.
07 Apr 1840	General Jose Castro arrested Isaac Graham and 60 conspirators in a plot known as the Graham Affair. 47 were found guilty. U.S. sloop of war (USS St. Louis) was sent to defuse the situation between American settlers and Mexican Californios. The ship arrived in Monterey Bay on June 30, being the first American military ship to set anchor in California. U.S. marines landed on California soil, leading Castro to release prisoners. The sloop left California on July 5.
1840	Richard Henry Dana, Jr. published Two Years Before the Mast, in which he described his sailing journey in Mexican California during 1834–1836. His book was the first to raise Anglo-American awareness of California for Americans on the east coast.
May 1841	General Juan Almonte, Mexican minister of war, wrote to Mariano Guadalupe Vallejo, comandante general of California, concerning the reported emigration of 58 families from Missouri and gave strict orders that every foreigner should be compelled to show a passport or leave the country. In the dispatch, Almonte enclosed a clipping from the National Intelligencer regarding "the convenience and necessity of the acquisition of the Californias by the United States". Almonte further warned Vallejo to put little trust in the alleged claim by the Americans that they were coming with peaceful intentions. Despite this command from Mexico City, the Californians showed little desire to molest the settlers from the United States.
Jul 1841	American Peter Lassen was arrested at Bodega Bay, California, for illegally entering California.
Sep 1841	The United States Exploring Expedition, on its world voyage under the command of Lieutenant Charles Wilkes, reached San Francisco Bay, with instructions from the U.S. government to survey the harbor.
04 Nov 1841	Bartleson–Bidwell Party, led by Captain John Bartleson and John Bidwell, arrived at John Marsh's ranch, becoming the first American emigrants to attempt a wagon crossing from Missouri to California.

=== Mexican–American War (1846–1848) ===
In the final decades of Mexican rule, American and European immigrants arrived and settled in the former Alta California. Those in Southern California mainly settled in and around the established coastal settlements and tended to intermarry with the Californios. In Northern California, they mainly formed new settlements further inland, especially in the Sacramento Valley, and these immigrants focused on fur-trapping and farming and kept apart from the Californios.

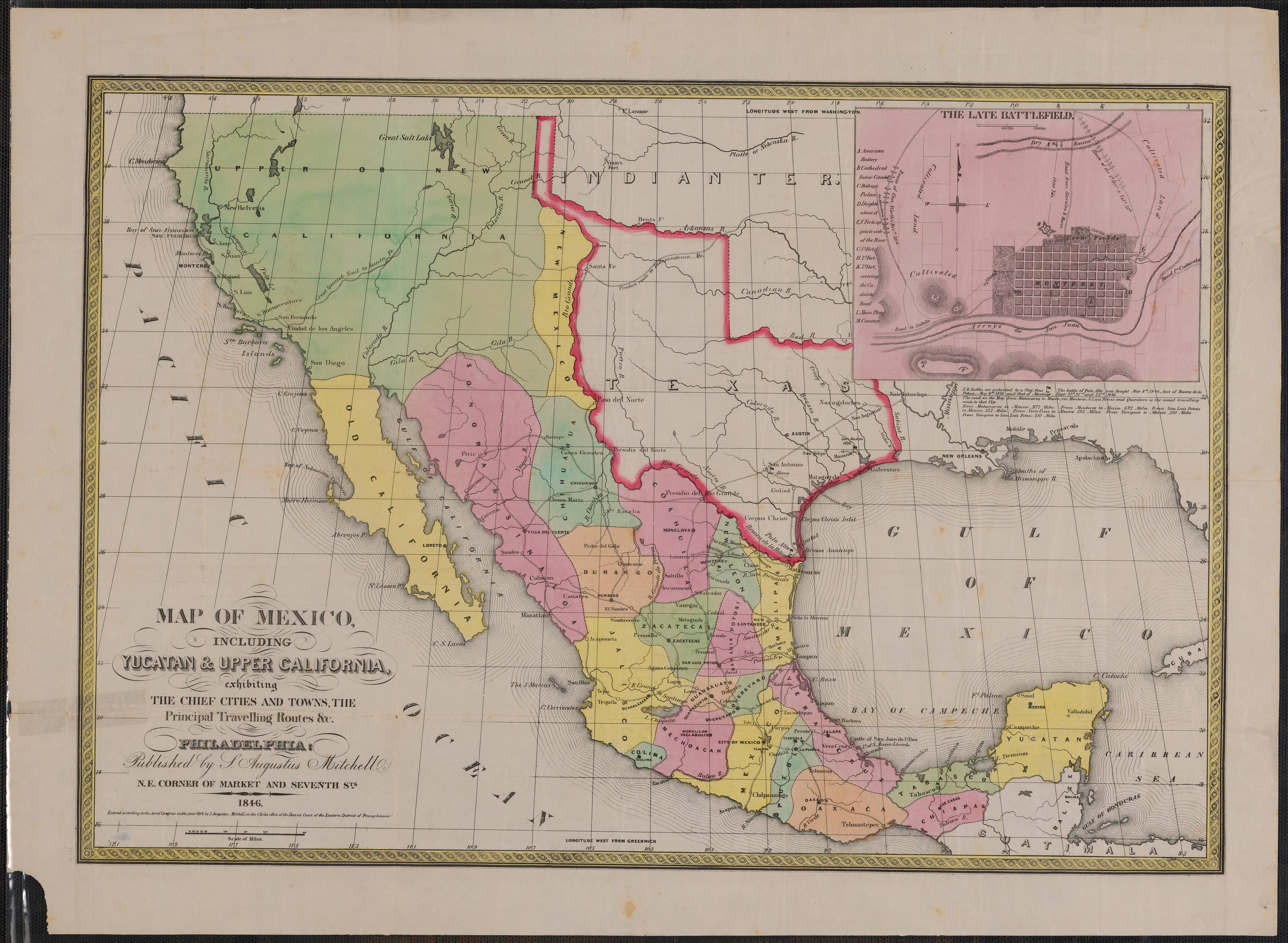
Map of Mexico. S. Augustus Mitchell, Philadelphia, 1847. New California is depicted with a northeastern border at the meridian leading north of the Rio Grande headwaters.

In 1846, following reports of the annexation of Texas to the United States, American settlers in inland Northern California took up arms, captured the Mexican garrison town of Sonoma, and declared independence there as the California Republic. At the same time, the United States and Mexico had gone to war, and forces of the United States Navy entered into Alta California and took possession of the northern port cities of Monterey and San Francisco. The forces of the California Republic, upon encountering the United States Navy and, from them, learning of the state of war between Mexico and the United States, abandoned their independence and proceeded to assist the United States forces in securing the remainder of Alta California. The California Republic was never recognized by any nation and existed for less than one month, but its flag (the "Bear Flag") survives as the flag of the State of California.

After the United States Navy's seizure of the cities of southern California, the Californios formed irregular units, which were victorious in the Siege of Los Angeles, and after the arrival of the United States Army, fought in the Battle of San Pasqual and the Battle of Domínguez Rancho. But the Californios were defeated in subsequent encounters, the battles of Río San Gabriel and La Mesa. The southern Californios formally surrendered with the signing of the Treaty of Cahuenga on January 13, 1847. After twenty-seven years as part of independent Mexico, California was ceded to the United States in 1848 with the signing of the Treaty of Guadalupe Hidalgo. The United States paid Mexico $15 million for the lands ceded.

== Pueblos ==
Three civilian settlements (pueblos) were officially granted municipal status, recognized by the government.

- Pueblo de la Reina de Los Ángeles (modern Los Angeles)
- Pueblo de Branciforte (modern Santa Cruz)
- Pueblo de San José de Guadalupe (modern San Jose)

== Historic population figures ==
=== Population statistics of Alta California Province ===
The data in this table includes California, Nevada, Utah and parts of Arizona, Colorado and Wyoming. (Note: Almost the entire Spanish and mixed-race population lived in present-day California.)

Year	Pop Spaniards/Mexican/Criollo	% pop	Mestizo, Castizo and other castes	% pop	Amerindians	% pop	Total Population	Inhabitants per Sq.League
1769	+ 300 (first foundation in Spanish California)	-						
1779	500	-		-		-		
1783	1,000	-		-		-		
1790 (Revillagigedo census)	N/A (by the late 1780s there were 1,137 Spaniards in Alta California)	-	18,780	09,8% (1793)	2,052–300,000	89.9% (1793)	20,871	10
1800	1,800	N/A	N/A	N/A	N/A	N/A	N/A	N/A
1810	2,000	N/A	N/A	N/A	250,000 (19,000 of whom were baptised)	N/A	N/A	N/A
1820	3,270	N/A	N/A	N/A	N/A	N/A	N/A	N/A
1838	4,000 whites (mostly being of Spanish origin and another 500 being foreigners; Faxon D. Atherton estimations (1982:206))	N/A	N/A	N/A	N/A	N/A	N/A (in 1836, 29,000 people lived in Alta California according to El Diario Oficial of Mexico City (1836:180)	N/A
1845	7,300 (Weber estimations (1982:206), although other sources indicated that in 1846 11,500 Californians were of Spaniard or Mexican descent)	N/A	N/A	N/A	150,000	N/A	N/A	N/A

=== Regions (1850 census) ===
Region	Pop Mexican/Criollo	% pop	Mestizo, Castizo and other castes	% pop	Amerindians	% pop	Total Population	Inhabitants per Sq.League
Los Angeles	3,480	-						
Monterey	1,853	-		-		-		
Santa Barbara	1,147	N/A	N/A	N/A				N/A
San Diego	757	-		-				-
San José	500	N/A	N/A			N/A	N/A	N/A
Napa	405	-		-				-
San Luis Obispo	335	N/A	N/A			N/A	N/A	N/A
San Francisco	186	N/A	N/A	N/A	N/A			N/A
Total	8,663		N/A	N/A	N/A	N/A	N/A	N/A

== In popular culture ==
- In the second half of the 19th century, there was a San Francisco-based newspaper called The Daily Alta California (or The Alta Californian). Mark Twain's first widely successful book, The Innocents Abroad, was an edited collection of letters written for this publication.
- In the 1998 film The Mask of Zorro, fictional former Governor Don Rafael Montero plans to purchase the area from Mexico to set up an independent republic, roughly corresponding to historical Alta California.
- The Carl Barks comic book Donald Duck in Old California! provided a glimpse into the lives of the Californios.

== See also ==
- History of California through 1899
- Territorial evolution of California
- Landing of the first Filipinos
- Bibliography of California history
