= José Joaquín de Arrillaga =

Basque officer

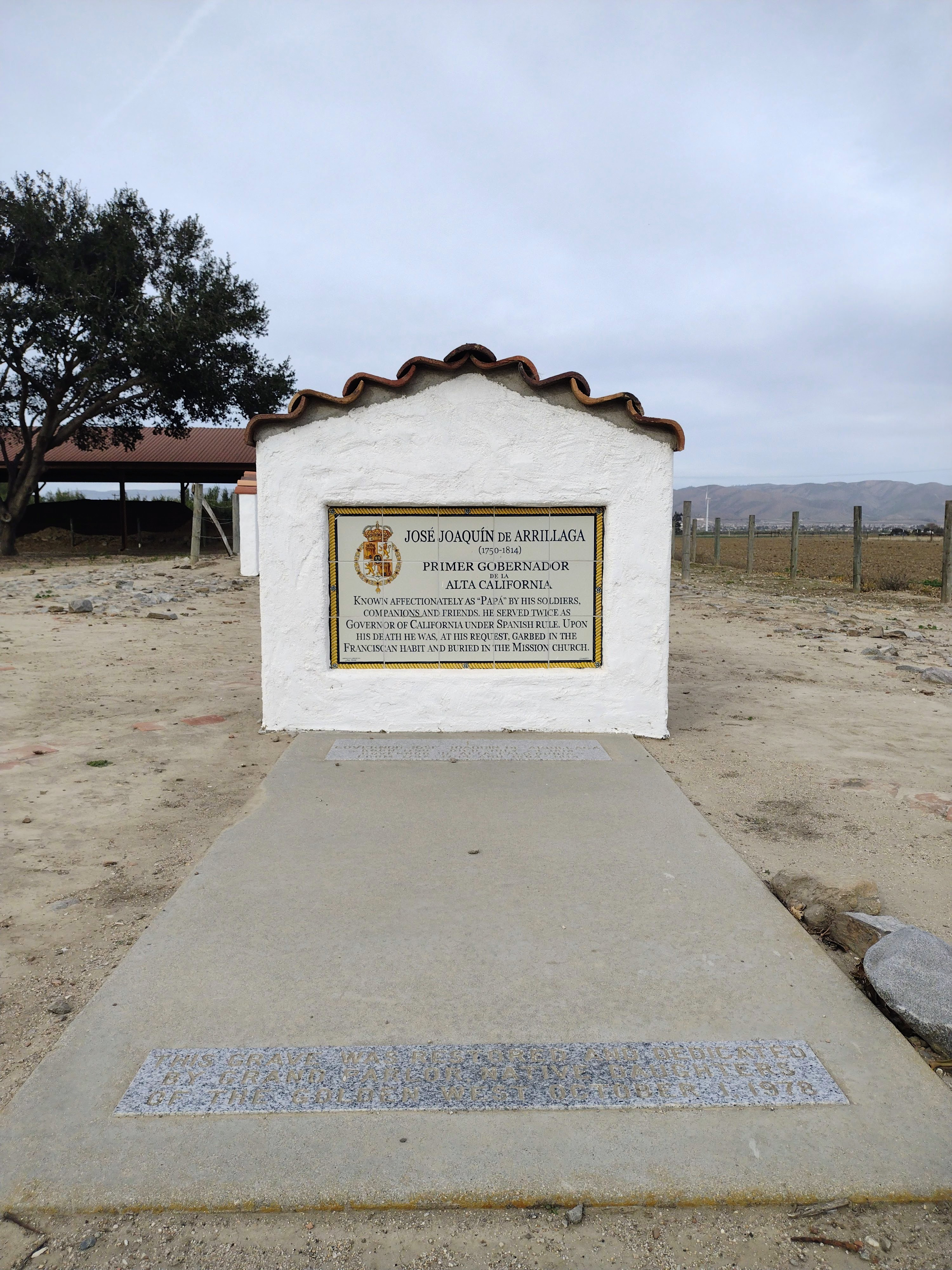
- Governor Arriaga's grave at Mission Nuestra Señora de la Soledad

Interim Governor of the Californias
- In office 1792–1794
- Preceded by: José Antonio Roméu
- Succeeded by: Diego de Borica

8th Governor of the Californias
- In office 1800–1804
- Preceded by: Pedro de Alberní y Teixidor
- Succeeded by: Himself as Governor of Alta California

1st Governor of Alta California
- In office 1804–1814
- Preceded by: Himself as Governor of the Californias
- Succeeded by: José Darío Argüello

Personal details
- Born: 1750 Aia, Gipuzkoa, Spain
- Died: 1814 (aged 63–64) Mission Nuestra Señora de la Soledad, New Spain (now Soledad, California, U.S.)
- Profession: Soldier

José Joaquín de Arrillaga (Spanish pronunciation: [/xoˈze ˈxo akin de aˈrijaga/] ho-SE ho-a-KEEN de a-ree-YA-ga) was a Basque officer who served twice as Governor of the Californias and as the first Governor of Alta California, following the partition of the Californias in 1804.

== Governor ==
Arrillaga served as captain in the Spanish army in northern Mexico and Texas in the 1780s and 1790s. He was the comandante at Loreto, Baja California Sur. He was reported to have been well-liked by all, known as an efficient and honest officer, and accordingly after the death of Governor José Antonio Roméu on April 9, 1792, Arrillaga was appointed acting Governor of California. He hoped to stay in Loreto and rule from there, but he was ordered to the capital in Monterey, California, and arrived in July 1793. To see the extent of the Spanish missions in California, he traveled north and visited missions and the Presidio of San Francisco, returning to the capital in September 1793. Arrillaga worked to make the presidios stronger and better run. During his tenure, one new mission was founded: Mission Santa Inés (September 17, 1804), and his administration was a time of peace at the missions.

He had a meeting with George Vancouver, an English officer of the British Royal Navy on the latter's 1791–95 expedition, which explored and charted North America's northwestern Pacific Coast regions, including the coasts of contemporary Alaska, British Columbia, Washington and Oregon. Vancouver also explored the Hawaiian Islands and the southwest coast of Australia. Arrillaga wanted to establish trading or business with him. When Arrillaga found that Vancouver had visited Mission Santa Clara de Asís without asking him for permission, he nonetheless dined with him and showed Spanish hospitality.

Arrillaga made a few (3 or 4) Monterey land grants to some of his men. He had a road made to the Pajaro River and ford across it.

In 1793 Vancouver made a second trip to California and visited Arrillaga again. Vancouver has just come from Hawaii. Arrillaga was upset that Vancouver had returned to California, and he did not trust Vancouver's claimed motives. Arrillaga ordered Vancouver's men to return to their ship each night, and he put guards at all the storehouses. He provided water and some supplies. Vancouver, seeing the less of Spanish hospitality than during his first visit, departed and left behind some water and goods given to him.

Arrillaga had a meeting with Juan Francisco de la Bodega y Quadra, Spanish commander of a naval expedition from San Blas, Nayarit, to Nootka Sound, on the west coast of what is now Vancouver Island in British Columbia). Bodega y Cuadra had been sent to find out about British and Russian settlements on the northwest Pacific coast. This was done through treaty talks with George Vancouver as part of the Nootka Convention. The talks' outcome was to transfer the Spanish outpost on Nootka Sound from Spain to Great Britain in 1795, shortly after Arrillaga departed office. Nootka Sound was considered to be too far north for Spain to defend it against British forces. Arrillaga was replaced in 1794 by Governor Diego de Borica. Diego de Borica died on August 19, 1800, and Arrillaga again was appointed Governor of the Californias until 1804. In 1804 the two Californias were separated and Arrillaga was appointed the first Spanish Governor of Alta California, a post in which he served until his death.

In 1806, he traded goods with the Russian Nikolai Rezanov, who had traveled from the Russian American Company's outpost in Sitka, Alaska. After Arrillaga's death, Spain changed its policy and ordered the removal of the Russian settlements, but because the settlements were so distant, this could not be entirely enforced.

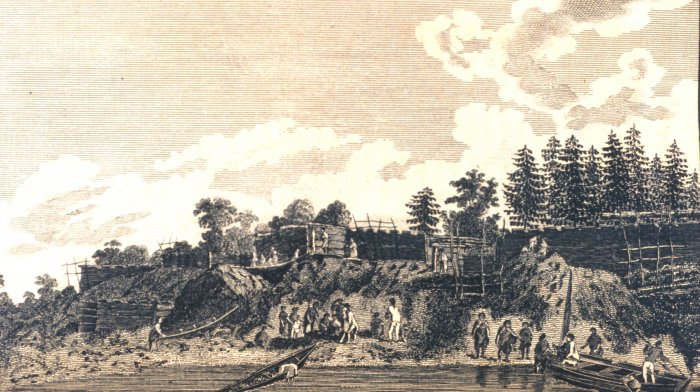
A view of the Habitations in Nootka Sound. In: "A Collection of Voyages round te World ... Captain Cook's First, Second, Third and Last Voyages ...." Volume V, London, 1790, page 1767.

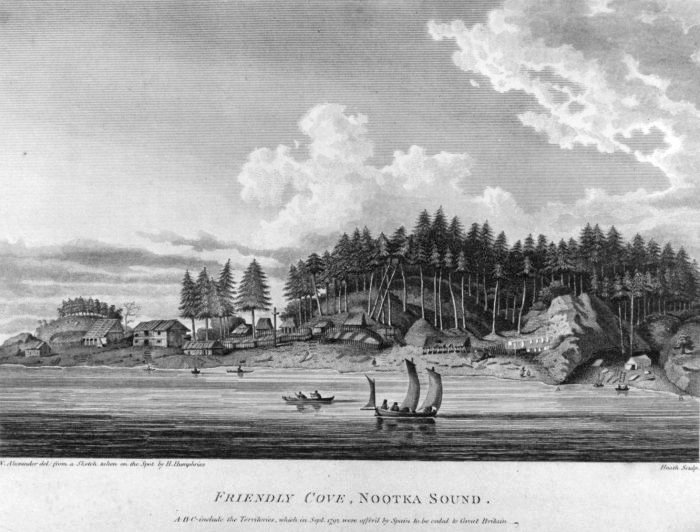
Friendly Cove, Nootka Sound. Volume I, plate VII from: "A Voyage of Discovery to the North Pacific Ocean and Round the World" by Captain George Vancouver.

== Death ==
On July 25, 1813, José Joaquín de Arrillaga died at Mission Nuestra Señora de la Soledad and was buried there. He was said to be the only Spanish governor to be buried in California on US soil, but is not accurate because the previous Spanish Governor, José Antonio Roméu, was buried at Carmel Mission in 1792. José Joaquín de Arrillaga's gravesite is located at 36°24′17″N 121°21′19″W. The inscription: "Known affectionately as "Papa" by his soldiers, companions and friends, he served twice as governor of California under Spanish rule. Upon his death in 1814 he was, at his request, garbed in the Franciscan habit and buried in the mission church."

== See also ==
- New Spain
- History of California through 1899
- List of pre-statehood governors of California
