= Diego de Borica =

Basque soldier

7th Governor of the Californias
- In office 1794–1800
- Preceded by: José Joaquín de Arrillaga
- Succeeded by: Pedro de Alberní y Teixidor

Personal details
- Born: 12 November 1742 Vitoria-Gasteiz, Spain
- Died: 19 August 1800 (aged 57) Durango, New Spain
- Profession: Soldier

Diego de Borica (/ˈdjeɣo ðe βoˈɾika/ DYE-go de bo-REE-ka) (1742–1800) was a Basque colonial Governor of the Californias, from 1794 to 1800.

== Family ==
Diego de Borica y Retegui was born in Vitoria-Gasteiz to a family connected to Father Fermín de Lasuén's. In 1780 Diego de Borica married Maria Magdalena de Urquidi, a Mexican-Basque direct descendant of one of the founders of Durango, Mexico.

== Military advance as governor ==
As the governor, Diego de Borica and Father Lasuén determined that five more missions were needed in 1795 along El Camino Real. Borica sent expeditions from four different missions to find suitable new settlements that were no more than one day's travel as military escorts were necessary. By August 1796, Borica notified Viceroy Miguel de la Grúa Talamanca that no increase in troops was necessary. The first missionary site selected in 1796 was Mission San José near the pueblo of the same name.

During Borica's tenure as governor, five missions were founded: Mission San José (June 11, 1797), Mission San Juan Bautista (June 24, 1797), Mission San Miguel Arcángel (July 25, 1797), Mission San Fernando Rey de España (September 8, 1797) and Mission San Luis Rey de Francia (June 13, 1798).

In 1795, Borica gave José Darío Argüello a Spanish land grant known as Rancho de las Pulgas. This rancho was the largest grant on the San Francisco Peninsula spanning 35,260 acres (14,270 ha).

In 1797, Borica ordered the construction of a battery to protect the cove east of Point Medanos. The location initially was named "Bateria San Jose" and was chosen because the promontory overlooked San Francisco Bay and Alcatraz Island. Borica provisioned the unit with five brass cannons.

On orders from Viceroy La Grúa Talamanca, Borica established a school grounds at the center of Villa de Branciforte in 1797. Also in 1797, he granted José María Verdugo's retirement. Verdugo was the grantee of Rancho San Rafael.

In 1795 Borica gave a land grant of Rancho Nuestra Señora del Refugio, "Ranch of Our Lady of Refuge" in present day Santa Barbara County, California to José Francisco Ortega. (in 1813 the grant again confirmed by Governor José Joaquín de Arrillaga, also again by Mexican Governor José Figueroa to Antonio María Ortega.

Before stepping down as governor, Borica recommended reappointing José Joaquín de Arrillaga to organize military defenses for California.

== Intellect, concerns, and initiatives ==
Borica was a member of the Royal Basque Society (1779–1793) and influenced by the Enlightenment's ideas of progress (cf. circumstances in the Basque districts back in Europe), showing a concern for the welfare of his subjects. However, his attempts to establish settlements in California—for which purpose he thought of Catalans—and launch the economic development of California were largely foiled by the Spanish Crown's failure to back up his effort.

At a time when the publications of the Royal Basque Society encouraged sheep raising and wool growing, Borica fostered maximum autonomy for the Californian missions by spreading sheep among the ranchers, engaging even personally in that pursuit. He was successful during his office, but by the time of California's detachment from Mexico, flocks had diminished significantly.

== See also ==
- New Spain
- Las Californias
- History of California through 1899
- List of pre-statehood governors of California
- List of ranchos of California
- Bibliography of California history
