= Departamento =

Spanish-language country subdivision term

A Departamento (Spanish pronunciation: [depaɾtaˈmento]) is a country subdivision in several Latin American countries, mostly as top-level subnational divisions (except in Argentina). It is usually simply translated as "department".

== Current use ==
Ten countries currently have departamentos.

Country	Level	Num.	Subdivisions
Argentina	2nd (under provincias)	378	municipios
Bolivia	1st	9	provincias
Colombia	1st	32	municipios
El Salvador	1st	14	municipios
Guatemala	1st	22	municipios
Honduras	1st	18	municipios
Nicaragua	1st	15	municipios
Paraguay	1st	17	municipios
Peru	1st	24	municipios
Uruguay	1st	19	provincia

== Past use ==
Mexico in the 1830s was divided into 24 departamentos, which were first-level divisions. It was during an attempt to centralize the government.
