= Outline of the Mexican American War =

Mexican–American War
- Part of the Manifest destiny
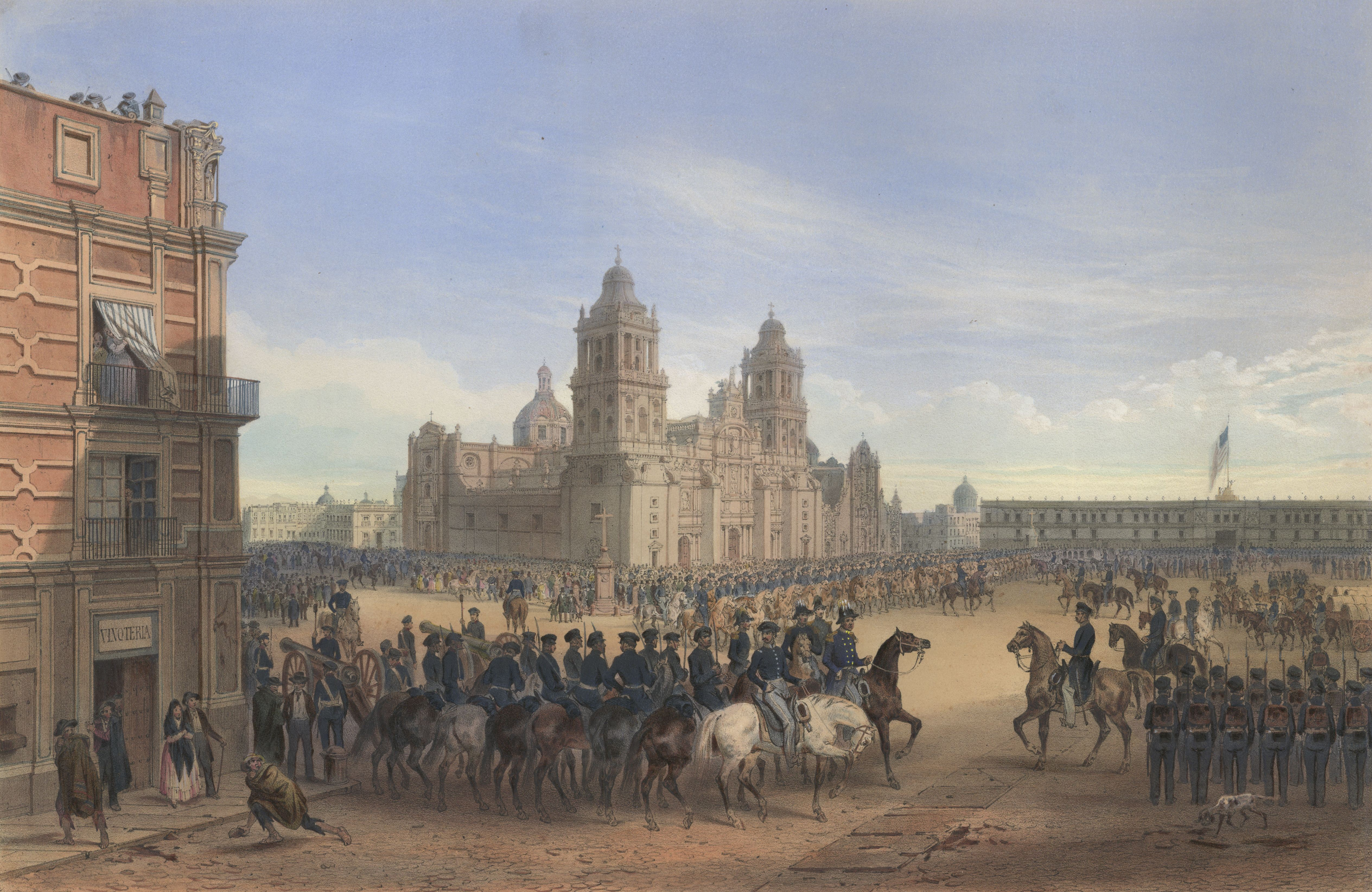
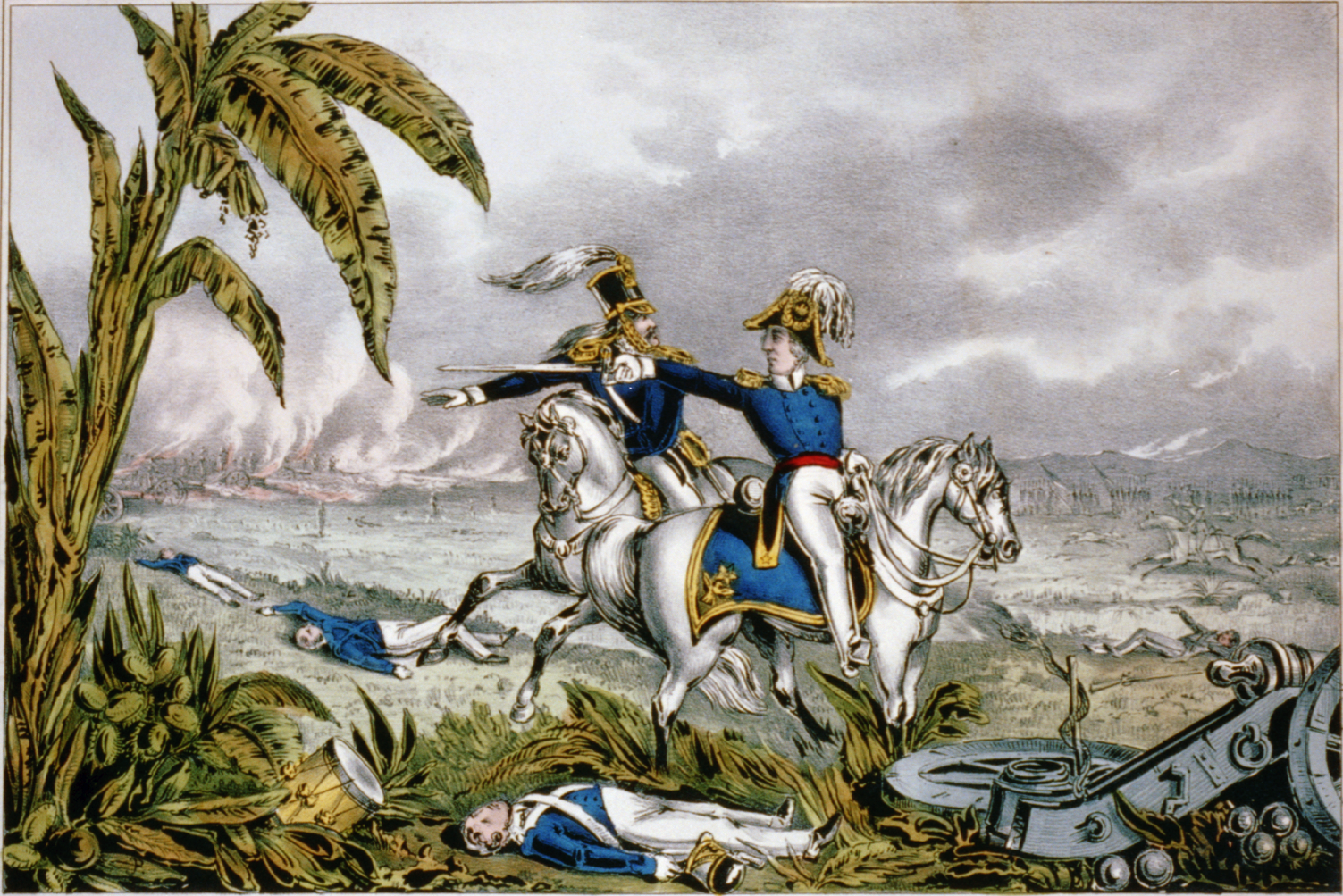
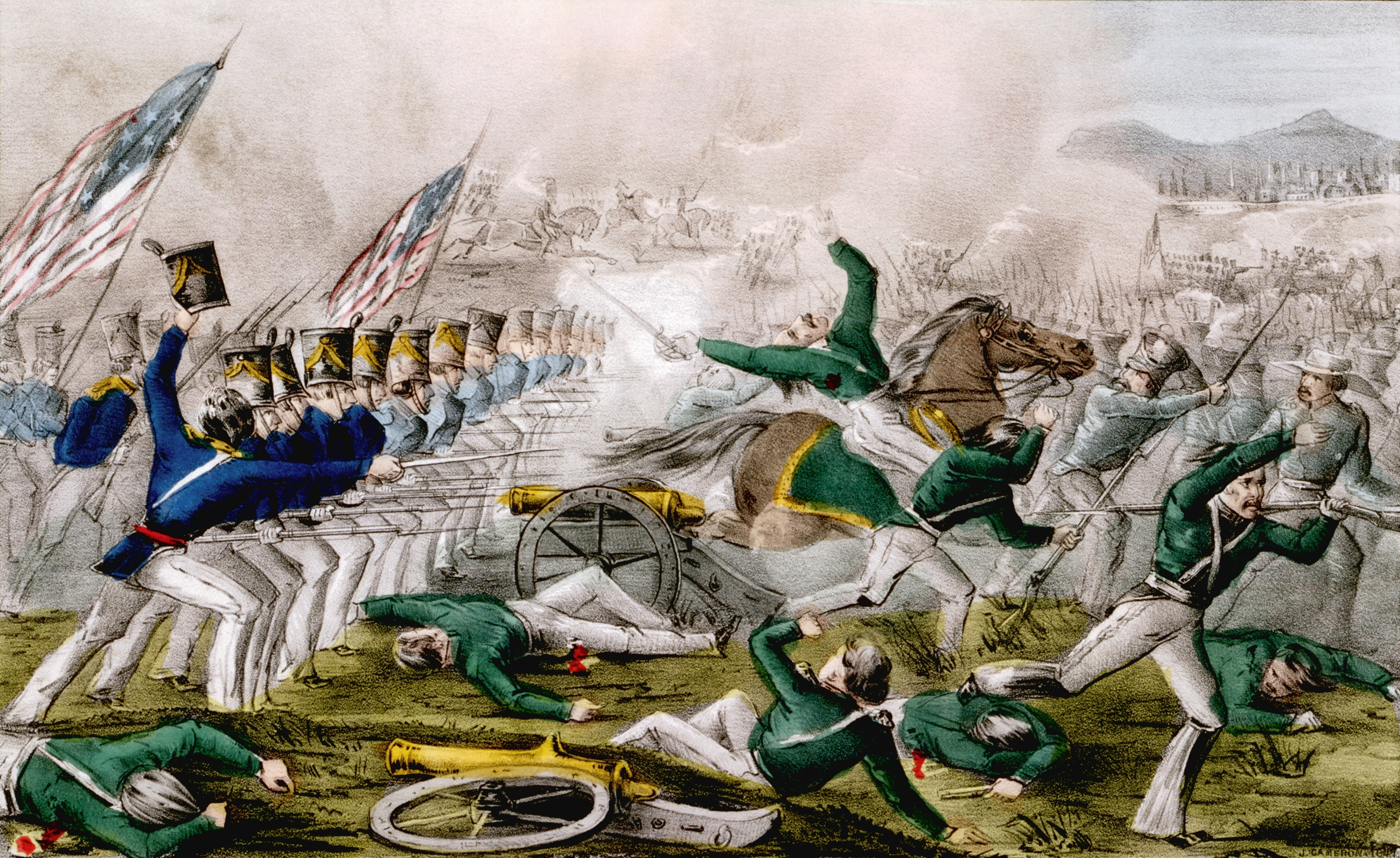
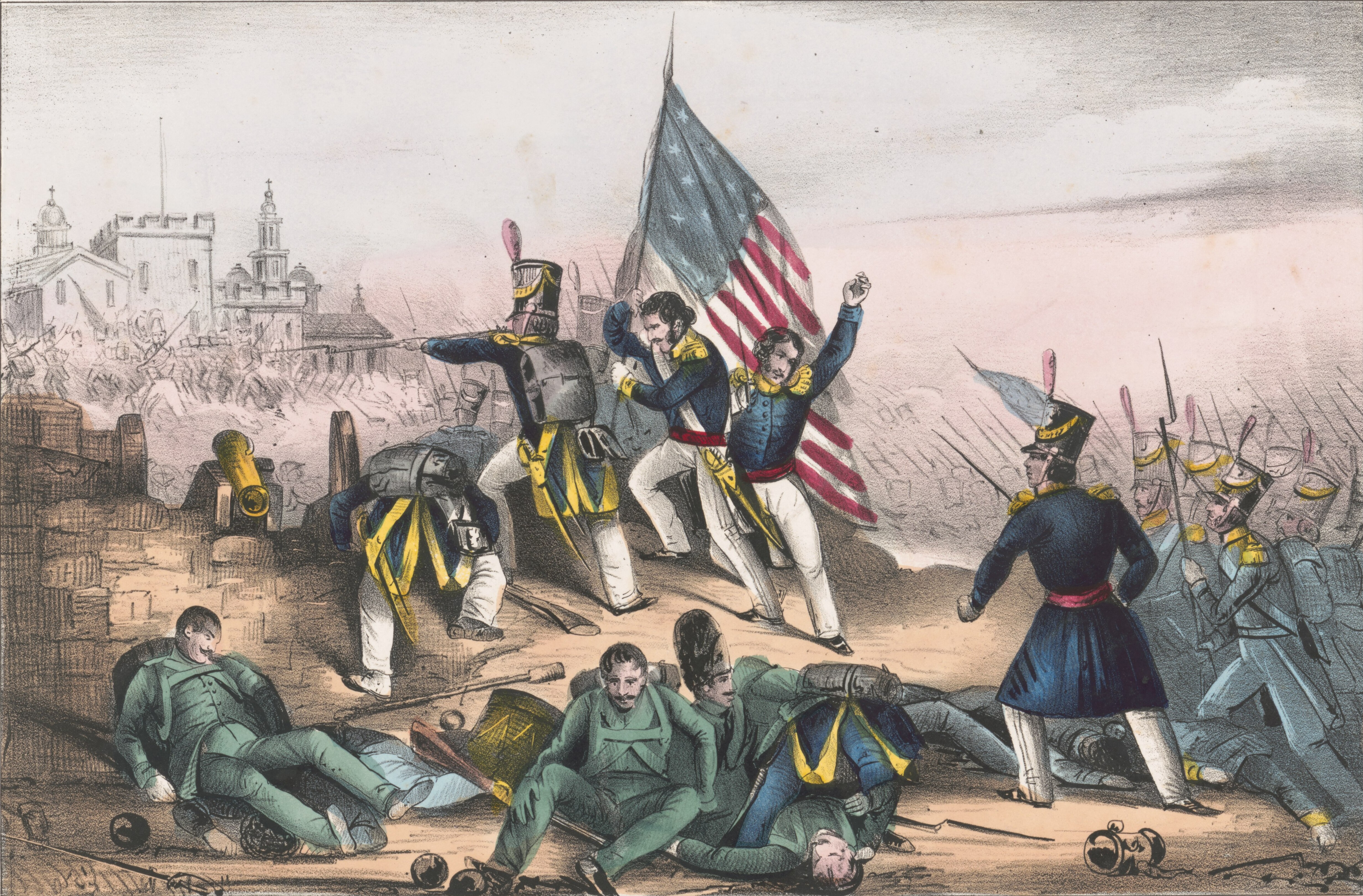
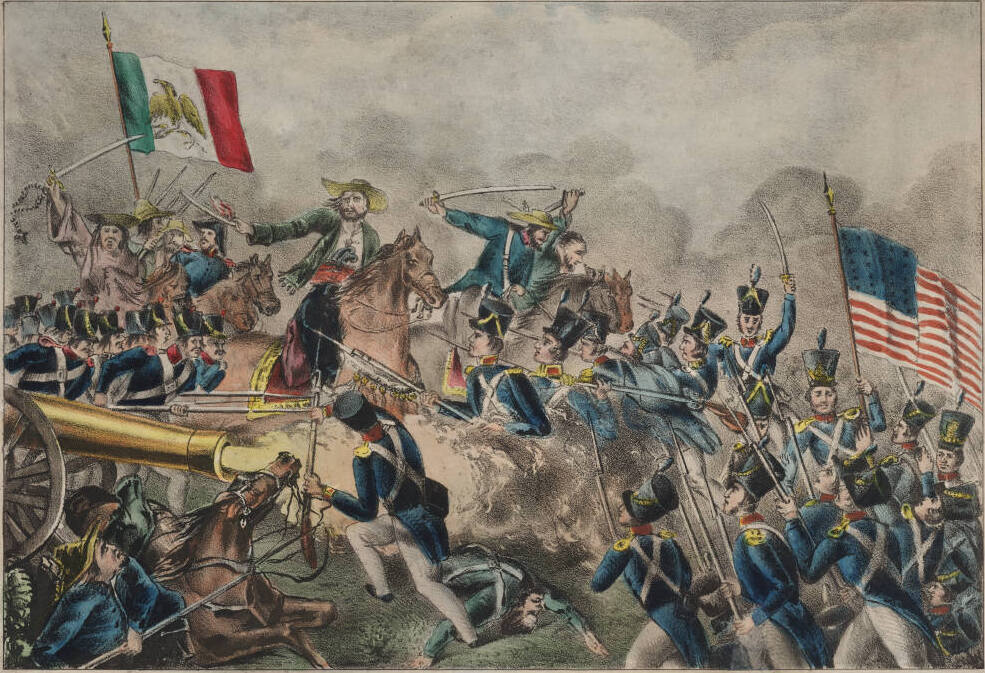
- Clockwise from top: Winfield Scott entering Plaza de la Constitución after the Fall of Mexico City, U.S. soldiers engaging the retreating Mexican force during the Battle of Resaca de la Palma, U.S. victory at Churubusco outside of Mexico City, Marines storming Chapultepec castle under a large U.S. flag, Battle of Cerro Gordo
Date	April 25, 1846 – February 2, 1848 (1 year, 9 months, 1 week and 1 day)
Location	Texas, New Mexico, California; Northern, Central, and Eastern Mexico; Mexico City
Result	American victory
Territorial changes	Mexican Cession: Mexico cedes to the U.S. present-day California, Texas, New Mexico, Utah, Nevada, and Arizona, and parts of Colorado, Oklahoma, Kansas, and Wyoming, for $15 million

This is a Wikipedia topical outline of articles about the Mexican American War. (Note: Including the Bear Flag Revolt and the Conquest of California.)

The Mexican–American War (April 25, 1846 – February 2, 1848), known in Mexico as the United States intervention in Mexico, was an invasion of Mexico by the United States. It followed the 1845 American annexation of Texas, which Mexico still claimed as its territory, and a dispute over the border: Texas and the U.S. asserted the Rio Grande, Mexico the more northerly Nueces River. President James K. Polk, elected in 1844 on a platform of territorial expansion, offered $25 million for the disputed land and California; Mexico refused. He then sent troops into the disputed territory, where Mexican forces repelled them on April 25, 1846, giving Polk grounds to obtain a declaration of war from Congress.

U.S. forces occupied Santa Fe de Nuevo México and Alta California, the Pacific Squadron blockaded Mexico's Pacific coast, and Major General Winfield Scott landed at Veracruz and captured Mexico City in September 1847. The 1848 Treaty of Guadalupe Hidalgo, negotiated by Nicholas Trist after Polk had recalled him, ended the war: Mexico ceded the territory of present-day California, Nevada, and Utah and parts of Arizona, Colorado, New Mexico, and Wyoming, gave up its claims on Texas, and accepted the Rio Grande as its northern border with the United States, while the U.S. paid $15 million and assumed $3.25 million of Mexican debt to U.S. citizens. The acquisitions intensified the American debate over slavery and are seen by some scholars as a step toward the American Civil War, in which many officers who had gained experience in Mexico later held prominent commands. Mexico was left with heavy casualties, ruined finances, political turmoil, lost prestige, and the loss of more than half its territory.

== Overview ==
- Mexican–American War - (25 April 1846 – 2 February 1848)
- All of Mexico Movement - expansionist campaign to annex the whole of Mexico.
- Californios - Spanish-speaking residents of Mexican Alta California.
- Mexican Cession - (1848) - territory ceded to the United States.
- United States and Mexican Boundary Survey - (1848–1855) - survey fixing the new border.
- United States declaration of war on Mexico - (13 May 1846)
- War crimes in the Mexican–American War
- Women in the Mexican–American War

== Legislation ==
- Spot Resolutions - (22 December 1847) - Abraham Lincoln's challenge to the war's justification.
- Wilmot Proviso - (1846) - failed proposal to bar slavery from conquered territory.

=== Treaties of the Mexican–American War ===
- Treaty of Cahuenga - (13 January 1847) - ended fighting in California.
- Treaty of Guadalupe Hidalgo - (2 February 1848) - peace treaty ending the war.
- Mexican Cession - (1848)
- Treaties of Velasco - (14 May 1836) - agreements ending the Texas Revolution.

== Military operations ==
- Battle of Cerro Gordo order of battle
- Battle of Palo Alto order of battle
- Siege of Veracruz order of battle

=== Campaigns ===
==== Texas Campaign ====
- Texas Campaign - (25 April – 9 May 1846)
- Thornton Affair - (25 April 1846)
- Siege of Fort Texas - (3–9 May 1846)
- Battle of Palo Alto - (8 May 1846)
- Battle of Resaca de la Palma - (9 May 1846)

==== Mexico City Campaign ====
- Battle for Mexico City - (8–15 September 1847)
- Blockade of Veracruz - (1846–1848)
- Siege of Veracruz - (9–29 March 1847)
- Battle of Cerro Gordo - (18 April 1847)
- Battle of Contreras - (19–20 August 1847)
- Battle of Churubusco - (20 August 1847)
- Siege of Puebla (1847) - (14 September – 12 October 1847)
- Battle of Huamantla - (9 October 1847)
- Action of Atlixco - (19 October 1847)
- Skirmish at Matamoros - (23 November 1847)
- Affair at Galaxara Pass - (24 November 1847)
- Action of Sequalteplan - (25 February 1848)
- Revolt of the Polkos - (26 February – 23 March 1847) - coup d'état in Mexico.

==== New Mexico and Arizona campaign ====
- Army of the West (1846) - Kearny's column that took New Mexico and California.
- Capture of Santa Fe - (15 August 1846)
- Capture of Tucson (1846) - (16 December 1846)
- Battle of El Brazito - (25 December 1846)

===== Taos Revolt =====
- Arroyo Hondo, Taos County, New Mexico
- Mora County, New Mexico
- Taos, New Mexico
- Taos Pueblo - Tiwa pueblo in New Mexico.
- Taos Revolt - (19 January – 9 July 1847) - Hispano and Puebloan uprising against American rule.

==== California Campaign ====
- Conquest of California - (15 June 1846 – 13 January 1847)
- Bear Flag Revolt - (14 June – 9 July 1846)
- California Republic - (1846)
- California Battalion
- Army of the West (1846)
- Interim government of California - (1846–1850)
- Treaty of Cahuenga - (13 January 1847)
- Campo de Cahuenga - site of the Treaty of Cahuenga.
- Yerba Buena, California - settlement renamed San Francisco in 1847.
- Rancho Las Camaritas - California land grant.
- San Pasqual Battlefield Monument

==== Pacific Coast Campaign ====
- Pacific Coast campaign (Mexican–American War)
- Bombardment of Guaymas - (20 October 1847)
- Battle of Mulegé - (2 October 1847)
- Bombardment of Punta Sombrero - (31 October 1847)
- Battle of La Paz - (16–17 November 1847)
- Siege of La Paz - (27 November – 8 December 1847)
- Battle of San José del Cabo - (20–21 November 1847)
- Siege of San José del Cabo - (22 January – 14 February 1848)
- Skirmish of Todos Santos - (30 March 1848)

==== Mosquito Fleet Campaign ====
- First Battle of Tabasco - (24–26 October 1846)
- Second Battle of Tabasco - (15–16 June 1847)
- First Battle of Tuxpan - (18 April 1847)
- Second Battle of Tuxpan - (June 1847)
- Third Battle of Tuxpan - (30 June 1847)

=== Battles of the Mexican–American War ===
==== Battles in the Northern Mexican Theater ====
- Battle of Monterrey - (21–24 September 1846)
- Battle of Buena Vista - (22–23 February 1847)
- Battle of Sacramento (Mexico) - (28 February 1847)
- Battle of Santa Cruz de Rosales - (16 March 1848)

==== Battles in New Mexico ====
- Battle of El Brazito - (25 December 1846)
- Capture of Santa Fe - (15 August 1846)

==== Battles of the Taos Revolt ====
- Battle of Cañada - (24 January 1847)
- First Battle of Mora - (24 January 1847)
- Battle of Embudo Pass - (29 January 1847)
- Second Battle of Mora - (1 February 1847)
- Siege of Pueblo de Taos - (3–5 February 1847)
- Red River Canyon affair - (26 May 1847)
- Cienega affair - (July 1847)

==== Battles in Arizona ====
- Capture of Tucson (1846) - (16 December 1846)

==== Battles in California ====
- Sacramento River massacre - (5 April 1846)
- Klamath Lake massacre - (12 May 1846)
- Sutter Buttes Massacre - (June 1846)
- Battle of Olómpali - (24 June 1846)
- Battle of Monterey - (7 July 1846)
- Capture of Yerba Buena - (9 July 1846)
- Siege of Los Angeles - (22–30 September 1846)
- Battle of Chino - (26–27 September 1846)
- Battle of Dominguez Rancho - (8–9 October 1846)
- Battle of Natividad - (16 November 1846)
- Battle of San Pasqual - (6–7 December 1846)
- Pauma massacre - (December 1846)
- Temecula massacre - (December 1846)
- Battle of Santa Clara (1847) - (2 January 1847)
- Battle of Río San Gabriel - (8 January 1847)
- Battle of La Mesa - (9 January 1847)

==== Battle for Mexico City ====
- Battle for Mexico City - (8–15 September 1847)
- Battle of Molino del Rey - (8 September 1847)
- Battle of Chapultepec - (12–13 September 1847)
- Niños Héroes - six cadets killed defending Chapultepec.
- Monumento a los Niños Héroes - monument in Chapultepec, Mexico City.

==== Naval battles of the Mexican–American War ====
- Blockade of Veracruz - (1846–1848)
- Siege of Veracruz - (9–29 March 1847)
- Battle of Monterey - (7 July 1846)
- First Battle of Tabasco - (24–26 October 1846)
- Second Battle of Tabasco - (15–16 June 1847)
- First Battle of Tuxpan - (18 April 1847)
- Second Battle of Tuxpan - (June 1847)
- Third Battle of Tuxpan - (30 June 1847)
- Bombardment of Guaymas - (20 October 1847)
- Bombardment of Punta Sombrero - (31 October 1847)
- Battle of Mulegé - (2 October 1847)

==== Sieges of the Mexican–American War ====
- Siege of Fort Texas - (3–9 May 1846)
- Siege of Los Angeles - (22–30 September 1846)
- Siege of Pueblo de Taos - (3–5 February 1847)
- Siege of Veracruz - (9–29 March 1847)
- Siege of Puebla (1847) - (14 September – 12 October 1847)
- Siege of La Paz - (27 November – 8 December 1847)
- Siege of San José del Cabo - (22 January – 14 February 1848)

== People ==
=== United States civilians ===
- Edward Turner Bale - (1810-1849) - Californian ranchero.
- Charles H. Beaubien - (1800-1864) - New Mexico judge.
- Peter Hansborough Bell - (1810-1898) - Texas Ranger, later governor of Texas.
- Charles Bent - (1799-1847) - first US governor of New Mexico, killed at Taos.
- Francis Preston Blair Jr. - (1821-1875) - served with Doniphan's expedition.
- Sarah A. Bowman - (c. 1813-1866) - camp follower known as "the Great Western".
- Aaron V. Brown - (1795-1859) - governor of Tennessee who raised volunteers.
- Kit Carson - (1809-1868) - scout and guide for Frémont and Kearny.
- Jane Cazneau - (1807-1878) - journalist and expansionist agent.
- Anna McClarmonde Chase - (1809-1874) - American spy at Tampico.
- Manuel Antonio Chaves - (1818-1889) - New Mexican militia officer.
- Cave Johnson Couts - (1821-1874) - dragoon officer in California.
- Delana R. Eckels - (1806-1888) - Indiana volunteer officer, later judge.
- John Joel Glanton - (1819-1850) - ranger and scalp hunter.
- Alexis Godey - (1818-1889) - scout with the California Battalion.
- Alvin Peterson Hovey - (1821-1891) - Indiana volunteer, later governor.
- Mifflin Kenedy - (1818-1895) - riverboat operator for Taylor's army.
- Richard King (entrepreneur) - (1824-1885) - riverboat pilot, later founder of the King Ranch.
- James Kirker - (1793-1852) - scalp hunter and guide.
- Jim Savage - (1817-1852) - California trader and militia leader.
- Ceran St. Vrain - (1802-1870) - trader who raised volunteers in the Taos Revolt.
- Juan Temple - (1796-1866) - Los Angeles merchant.
- Joseph R. Walker - (1798-1876) - mountain man and guide.
- James Whitcomb - (1795-1852) - governor of Indiana during the war.
- Joseph A. Wright - (1810-1867) - governor of Indiana.

=== United States military personnel ===
- Joseph Anderson (U.S. Army captain) - (1826-1879) - American settler.
- Robert Anderson (Union officer) - (1805-1871) - artillery officer.
- Lewis Armistead - (1817-1863) - Confederate general.
- Edward D. Baker - (1811-1861) - Illinois volunteer colonel.
- P. G. T. Beauregard - (1818-1893) - Confederate States Army general.
- Charles Bigelow (politician) - (1805-1885) - mayor of Houston and war-era quartermaster.
- Milledge Luke Bonham - (1813-1890) - South Carolina volunteer officer.
- Braxton Bragg - (1817-1876) - Confederate general.
- Jacob Brown (Texas soldier) - (1789-1846) - died defending Fort Texas.
- Simon Bolivar Buckner - (1823-1914) - Confederate Army general and American politician.
- Don Carlos Buell - (1818-1898) - infantry officer.
- John Burgwin - (1810-1847) - killed at the Siege of Pueblo de Taos.
- Ambrose Burnside - (1824-1881) - American general and politician.
- Pierce Mason Butler - (1798-1846) - killed at Churubusco.
- William O. Butler - (1791-1880) - succeeded Scott in command in Mexico.
- George Cadwalader - (1806-1879) - volunteer general.
- William B. Campbell - (1807-1867) - Tennessee volunteer colonel.
- Thomas Childs - (1796-1853) - defended Puebla.
- Sylvester Churchill - (1783-1862) - inspector general.
- Temple Clark - (1826-1893) - American politician and Union Army officer.
- Newman S. Clarke - (1793-1860) - brigade commander.
- Henry Clay Jr. - (1811-1847) - killed at Buena Vista.
- Samuel Cooper (general) - (1798-1876) - staff officer.
- George Croghan (soldier) - (1791-1849) - inspector general.
- Caleb Cushing - (1800-1879) - volunteer general.
- Jefferson Davis - (1808-1889) - colonel of the Mississippi Rifles; later Confederate president.
- Ferdinand Van Derveer - (1823-1892)
- Alexander William Doniphan - (1808-1887) - led the Missouri volunteers to Chihuahua.
- Earl Van Dorn - (1820-1863) - Confederate States Army general.
- Abner Doubleday - (1819-1893) - Union Army general.
- James Duncan (United States Army officer) - (1811-1849) - light artillery officer.
- Richard S. Ewell - (1817-1872) - United States Army officer and Confederate general.
- Ferris Foreman - (1808-1901) - American politician.
- John Garland (general) - (1792-1861) - brigade commander.
- John Gibbon - (1827-1896) - United States Army officer.
- Ulysses S. Grant - (1822-1885) - Civil War general, U.S. president from 1869 to 1877.
- Thomas L. Hamer - (1800-1846) - Ohio congressman and volunteer general.
- Winfield Scott Hancock - (1824-1886) - United States Army officer.
- John J. Hardin - (1810-1847) - killed at Buena Vista.
- William S. Harney - (1800-1889) - cavalry commander.
- William T. Haskell - (1818-1859) - Tennessee volunteer officer.
- John Coffee Hays - (1817-1883) - Texas Ranger commander.
- Archibald Henderson - (1783-1859) - Commandant of the Marine Corps.
- A. P. Hill - (1825-1865) - Confederate Army general.
- Daniel Harvey Hill - (1821-1889) - Confederate States Army general.
- Ethan A. Hitchcock (general) - (1798-1870) - Scott's inspector general.
- Joseph Hooker - (1814-1879) - American Union Army general.
- Benjamin Huger (general) - (1805-1877) - chief of ordnance under Scott.
- Stonewall Jackson - (1824-1863) - Confederate States Army general.
- Thomas Jesup - (1788-1860) - quartermaster general.
- Joseph E. Johnston - (1807-1891) - Confederate Army general.
- Philip Kearny - (1815-1862) - dragoon officer who lost an arm at Churubusco.
- Stephen W. Kearny - (1794-1848) - commanded the Army of the West.
- Nicholas Krekel - (1825-1910) - American soldier and city founder.
- Joseph Lane - (1801-1881) - volunteer general and guerrilla-hunter.
- Robert E. Lee - (1807-1870) - Confederate States Army general.
- James Longstreet - (1821-1904) - Confederate Army general.
- Charles A. May - (1818-1864) - dragoon officer at Resaca de la Palma.
- George B. McClellan - (1826-1885) - American major general.
- Alexander Keith McClung - (1811-1855) - Mississippi Rifles officer.
- Benjamin McCulloch - (1811-1862) - Texas Ranger and chief of scouts.
- Irvin McDowell - (1818-1885) - American army officer.
- George Meade - (1815-1872) - United States Army general and civil engineer.
- John Munroe - (1796-1861) - artillery officer, later governor of New Mexico.
- Daniel Martin Murphy - (1826-1882) - Canadian-born American settler and rancher in California.
- John Marion Murphy - (1824-1892) - Canadian-born American politician, businessman and settler in California.
- Richard M. Norment - (1829-1912) - American physician, politician and military officer.
- Robert Patterson (general) - (1792-1881) - volunteer division commander.
- John C. Pemberton - (1814-1881) - Confederate army general.
- George Pickett - (1825-1875) - Confederate States Army general.
- Franklin Pierce - (1804-1869) - brigadier general; later US president.
- Albert Pike - (1809-1891) - Arkansas volunteer officer.
- Gideon Johnson Pillow - (1806-1878) - volunteer general.
- Sterling Price - (1809-1867) - suppressed the Taos Revolt.
- John A. Quitman - (1798-1858) - volunteer general; military governor of Mexico City.
- Truman B. Ransom - (1802-1847) - killed at Chapultepec.
- Bennet C. Riley - (1790-1853) - brigade commander.
- Samuel Ringgold (United States Army officer) - (1796-1846) - artillerist mortally wounded at Palo Alto.
- Winfield Scott - (1786-1866) - general-in-chief; led the march on Mexico City.
- John Sedgwick - (1813-1864) - American teacher, military officer, and Union Army general.
- James Shields (politician, born 1806) - (1806-1879) - volunteer general.
- Edmund Kirby Smith - (1824-1893) - Confederate States Army general.
- Persifor Frazer Smith - (1798-1858) - brigade and division commander.
- John L. T. Sneed - (1820-1901) - American state supreme court judge and attorney general in Tennessee.
- Jonathan D. Stevenson - (1800-1894) - colonel of the 1st Regiment of New York Volunteers.
- Edwin Vose Sumner - (1797-1863) - dragoon commander.
- Grantham Israel Taggart - (1828-1905) - United States Army colonel.
- Zachary Taylor - (1784-1850) - commander in northern Mexico; later US president.
- George Henry Thomas - (1816-1870) - American army general.
- David E. Twiggs - (1790-1862) - division commander.
- Levi Twiggs - (1793-1847) - Marine officer killed at Chapultepec.
- John C. Vaughn - (1824-1875) - American politician.
- David Hammond Vinton - (1803-1873) - quartermaster.
- Samuel Hamilton Walker - (1817-1847) - Texas Ranger killed at Huamantla.
- Jacob Wallace - (1810-1847) - guerrilla fighter.
- Lew Wallace - (1827-1905) - American general, politician, and author.
- William H. Watson - (1808-1846) - killed at Monterrey.
- William Whistler - (1780-1863) - infantry colonel.
- Chilton A. White - (1826-1900) - American politician.
- John H. Winder - (1800-1865) - infantry officer.
- John E. Wool - (1784-1869) - led the column into Chihuahua.
- William J. Worth - (1794-1849) - division commander at Monterrey and Mexico City.
- George Wright (general) - (1803-1865) - infantry officer.
- Archibald Yell - (1797-1847) - Arkansas governor killed at Buena Vista.
- Jacob Zeilin - (1806-1880) - Marine officer, later Commandant.

==== Mormon Battalion ====
- James Allen (Army engineer) - (1806-1846) - first battalion commander.
- Reddick Allred - (1822-1906) - American soldier and missionary.
- Henry G. Boyle - (1824-1902)
- James Stephens Brown (Mormon) - (1828-1902)
- Edward Bunker (Mormon) - (1822-1901)
- Robert Clift Jr. - (1824-1859)
- Philip St. George Cooke - (1809-1895) - led the battalion to California.
- Daniel C. Davis - (1804-1850) - American Mormon pioneer.
- John E. Forsgren - (1816-1890) - Swedish Mormon missionary.
- Stephen Clark Foster - (1820-1898) - American politician.
- Levi W. Hancock - (1803-1882) - battalion musician and church leader.
- Ephraim Hanks - (1826-1896) - American Mormon leader.
- Jefferson Hunt - (1803-1879) - senior Latter-day Saint officer.
- Dimick B. Huntington - (1808-1879) - Utah territory Indian interpreter.
- Christopher Layton - (1821-1898) - American politician.
- Elam Luddington - (1806-1893) - American missionary.
- Edward Martin (pioneer) - (1818-1882) - Church of Jesus Christ of Latter-day Saints member.
- John R. Murdock (Mormon) - (1826-1913) - American politician.
- William Prows - (1827-1894) - American Mormon leader.
- Levi Savage Jr. - (1820-1910) - LDS Church missionary.
- James Calvin Sly - (1807-1864)
- Lot Smith - (1830-1892) - American Mormon pioneer.
- Willard G. Smith - (1827-1903) - American politician and Mormon leader.
- George Stoneman - (1822-1894) - later Union general and governor of California.
- Pauline Weaver - (1797-1867) - guide and prospector.
- William S. S. Willes - (1819-1871)

==== People involved in the Conquest of California ====
- José Abrego - (1813-1878) - Californian merchant.
- Juan Bautista Alvarado - (1809-1882) - former governor of Alta California.
- Santiago Argüello - (1791-1862) - Californio ranchero and soldier.
- Edward Fitzgerald Beale - (1822-1893) - naval officer who crossed enemy lines at San Pasqual.
- Boyle–Workman family - pioneer family of the Pueblo de Los Ángeles.
- José Antonio Carrillo - (1796-1862) - Californio politician and ranchero.
- Joseph John Chapman - (1784-1849) - one of the earliest English-speaking settlers of Alta California.
- Antonio F. Coronel - (1817-1894) - Californio officer, later mayor of Los Angeles.
- Francisco Guerrero y Palomares - (1811-1851) - Californio soldier and politician.
- Peter Lassen - (1800-1859) - Danish-born Californian ranchero and prospector.
- Lugo family of California - Californio family of the Los Angeles Basin.
- William Mendenhall - American landowner, founder of Livermore, California.
- José Matías Moreno - (1819-1869) - Mexican governor.
- José de Jesús Noé - (1805-1862) - Californio ranchero and alcalde of San Francisco.
- James F. Reed - (1800-1874) - Donner Party organiser who served in California.
- Francisco Sánchez (American politician) - (1805-1862) - Californio commandant of the Presidio of San Francisco.
- Benjamin Davis Wilson - (1811-1878) - ranchero known as Don Benito Wilson.
- Workman–Temple family - pioneer family of the Pueblo de Los Ángeles.
- Juana Wrightington - (1814-1901) - San Diego nurse.
- Thomas Wrightington - (c. 1797-1853) - early settler of San Diego.

==== Americans involved in the Bear Flag Revolt ====
- John Bidwell - (1819-1900) - pioneer and Bear Flag participant.
- William D. Bradshaw - (1826-1864) - early western US pioneer.
- Jerome C. Davis - (1822-1881)
- Benjamin Dewell - (1821-1905) - American early settler and rancher.
- Juan Flaco - (1799-1859) - courier who rode from Los Angeles to Monterey.
- John C. Frémont - (1813-1890) - army explorer who led the Bear Flag insurgents.
- Archibald H. Gillespie - (1812-1873) - Marine courier to Frémont.
- William B. Ide - (1796-1852) - head of the California Republic.
- Andrew Kelsey - (1819-1849) - California pioneer.
- Benjamin Kelsey - (1813-1889) - American pioneer.
- Edward Kern - (1822-1863) - artist and commander of Sutter's Fort.
- Thomas O. Larkin - (1802-1858) - US consul at Monterey.
- Jacob P. Leese - (1809-1892) - Sonoma ranchero and merchant.
- John Marsh (pioneer) - (1799-1856) - American physician.
- Elijah Moulton - (1820-1902) - American politician.
- Pierson B. Reading - (1816-1868) - American politician.
- Joseph Warren Revere (general) - (1812-1880) - raised the US flag at Sonoma.
- Robert B. Semple - (1806-1854) - newspaperman and insurgent.
- John Sutter - (1803-1880) - owner of Sutter's Fort.
- Granville P. Swift - (1821-1875) - California pioneer.

==== Commanders of the California Republic ====
- John C. Frémont - (1813-1890) - United States Army officer, explorer, and politician.
- William B. Ide - (1796-1852) - American pioneer and politician.
- Edward Kern - (1822-1863) - American painter and explorer.
- John B. Montgomery - (1794-1873) - United States Navy admiral.
- John D. Sloat - (1781-1867) - military governor of California.

==== United States military governors of California ====
- John C. Frémont - (1813-1890) - United States Army officer, explorer, and politician.
- Stephen W. Kearny - (1794-1848) - United States general.
- Richard Barnes Mason - (1797-1850) - American military officer.
- Bennet C. Riley - (1790-1853) - United States Army general and politician.
- John D. Sloat - (1781-1867) - military governor of California.
- Persifor Frazer Smith - (1798-1858) - American military officer.
- Robert F. Stockton - (1795-1866) - United States Navy officer.

==== Chaplains ====
- John D. McCarty - (1798-1881) - Episcopal chaplain.
- John McElroy (Jesuit) - (1782-1877) - first US Army Catholic chaplain.
- Anthony Rey - (1807-1847) - Jesuit chaplain killed near Monterrey.

==== United States Navy personnel ====
- James Alden Jr. - (1810-1877)
- David Conner (naval officer) - (1792-1856) - commanded the Home Squadron.
- Samuel Francis Du Pont - (1803-1865) - commanded USS Cyane.
- David Farragut - (1801-1870) - later Union admiral.
- French Forrest - (1796-1866) - led the naval landing at Veracruz.
- Louis M. Goldsborough - (1805-1877) - United States Navy admiral.
- Thomas ap Catesby Jones - (1790-1858) - Pacific Squadron commander.
- Elie A. F. La Vallette - (1790-1862) - American naval officer.
- Sydney Smith Lee - (1802-1869) - Confederate States naval officer.
- Isaac Mayo - (1794-1861) - American naval officer.
- William McKean - (1800-1865) - United States Navy admiral.
- William Mervine - (1791-1868) - led the landing at Los Angeles.
- John B. Montgomery - (1794-1873) - seized Yerba Buena.
- Garrett J. Pendergrast - (1802-1862) - American naval officer.
- Matthew C. Perry - (1794-1858) - succeeded Conner; led the Mosquito Fleet.
- David Dixon Porter - (1813-1891) - later Union admiral.
- Stephen Clegg Rowan - (1808-1890) - American admiral.
- Raphael Semmes - (1809-1877) - later Confederate raider captain.
- William Shubrick - (1790-1874) - Pacific Squadron commander.
- John D. Sloat - (1781-1867) - Pacific Squadron commander who claimed California.
- Robert F. Stockton - (1795-1866) - Pacific Squadron commander in California.
- Josiah Tattnall III - (1795-1871) - commanded the Mosquito Fleet's gunboats.
- John Ancrum Winslow - (1811-1873) - United States Navy admiral.
- John Lorimer Worden - (1818-1897) - US Navy admiral.

=== Individuals involved in the Taos Revolt ===
- John David Albert - (1810-1899) - American mountain man.
- Diego Archuleta - (1814-1884) - New Mexico military officer.
- Charles Autobees - (1812-1882) - fur trader and American pioneer.
- Charles H. Beaubien - (1800-1864) - judge who tried the rebels.
- Charles Bent - (1799-1847) - governor killed at the outbreak of the revolt.
- John Burgwin - (1810-1847) - killed at Pueblo de Taos.
- Manuel Antonio Chaves - (1818-1889) - New Mexican soldier.
- Joab Houghton - (1811-1876) - chief justice of the New Mexico court.
- Pablo Montoya - (1816-1847) - Hispano leader of the revolt.
- Sterling Price - (1809-1867) - commanded the American suppression.
- Tomás Romero (revolutionary) - (?-1848) - Taos Pueblo leader of the revolt.
- Ceran St. Vrain - (1802-1870) - raised a company of volunteers.
- Thomas Tate Tobin - (1823-1904) - American adventurer.

=== Mexican civilians ===
- Juan Cortina - (1824-1894) - Mexican irregular in the Rio Grande valley.
- Joaquín García Icazbalceta - (1825-1894) - historian and wartime volunteer.
- José Joaquín de Herrera - (1792-1854) - president at the outbreak of the crisis.
- Ignacio de la Llave - (1818-1863) - Veracruz politician and officer.
- José María Mata - (1819-1895) - liberal politician.
- Melchor Ocampo - (1814-1861) - governor of Michoacán opposed to the treaty.
- Mariano Paredes - (1797-1849) - president when war was declared.
- Manuel de la Peña y Peña - (1789-1850) - president who approved the peace treaty.
- Martin Tritschler - (1814-1894) - German-Mexican civilian held by US forces.

=== Mexican military personnel ===
- Juan Almonte - (1803-1869) - minister of war and diplomat.
- Juan Álvarez - (1790-1867) - cavalry commander in the Valley of Mexico.
- Pedro de Ampudia - (1805-1868) - defended Monterrey.
- Pedro María de Anaya - (1795-1854) - defended Churubusco; twice acting president.
- Diego Archuleta - (1814-1884) - New Mexican officer and revolt leader.
- Santiago E. Argüello - (1813-1857)
- Mariano Arista - (1802-1855) - commanded at Palo Alto and Resaca de la Palma.
- Manuel Armijo - (1793-1853) - governor of New Mexico who abandoned Santa Fe.
- Juan de la Barrera - (1828-1847) - one of the Niños Héroes.
- Juan Davis Bradburn - (1787-1842) - brigadier general in the Mexican Army.
- Nicolás Bravo - (1786-1854) - commanded at Chapultepec.
- Valentín Canalizo - (1794-1850) - general and former acting president.
- José María Jesús Carbajal - (1809-1874) - Mexican freedom fighter.
- José Castro - (1808-1860) - commandant general of Alta California.
- Martín Perfecto de Cos - (1800-1854) - general of the Mexican Army.
- Celedonio Dómeco de Jarauta - (1814-1848) - priest and guerrilla leader.
- Vicente Filísola - (1785-1850) - Mexican general and politician.
- José María Flores - (1818-1866) - Mexican commander in California.
- Pedro Hinojosa - (1822-1903) - Mexican politician and military general.
- Antonio León (soldier) - (1794-1847) - killed at Molino del Rey.
- Manuel María Lombardini - (1802-1853) - division commander at Buena Vista.
- Leonardo Márquez - (1820-1913) - Mexican general.
- Tomás Mejía - (1820-1867) - Mexican general.
- Miguel Miramón - (1832-1867) - Mexican general, later president.
- Niños Héroes - six cadets killed at Chapultepec.
- Tomás O'Horán y Escudero - (1819-1867) - Mexican general.
- Andrés Pico - (1810-1876) - commanded Californio forces at San Pasqual.
- Manuel Pineda Muñoz - (1804-1891) - led Mexican resistance in Baja California.
- Joaquín Rea - (?-1850) - guerrilla commander who besieged Puebla.
- John Riley (soldier) - (1824-1879) - Irish-born leader of the Saint Patrick's Battalion.
- Antonio Rosales - (1822-1865) - Mexican Army general.
- José Mariano Salas - (1797-1867) - general and acting president in 1846.
- Antonio López de Santa Anna - (1794-1876) - president and commander of Mexican armies.
- José María Tornel - (1795-1853) - minister of war.
- Anastasio Torrejón - (1802-1858) - cavalry commander at the Thornton Affair.
- José de Urrea - (1797-1849) - cavalry commander against Taylor's supply lines.
- Gabriel Valencia - (1799-1848) - defeated at Contreras.
- Adrián Woll - (1795-1875) - French-born Mexican general.
- Felipe Santiago Xicoténcatl - (1804-1847) - killed at Chapultepec.
- José María Yáñez - (1803-1880) - 19th-century Mexican military leader and war hero.
- Agustín V. Zamorano - (1798-1842) - American politician.

=== Mexican individuals involved in the Bear Flag Revolt ===
- José de los Santos Berreyesa - (1817-1864)
- Francisca Benicia Carrillo de Vallejo - (1815-1891) - Californio pioneer.
- Cayetano Juárez - (1809-1883)
- Manuel Micheltorena - (1804-1853) - former governor of Alta California.
- Pío Pico - (1801-1894) - last Mexican governor of Alta California.
- José de la Rosa - printer at Sonoma, known as Don Pepe.
- Mariano Guadalupe Vallejo - (1807-1890) - Sonoma commandant seized by the Bear Flaggers.

== Organizations ==
- Aztec Club of 1847 - military society of American officers who served in Mexico.
  - List of members of the Aztec Club of 1847

=== Units ===
- 1st Indiana Volunteers
- 1st Regiment of New York Volunteers
- 2nd Indiana Volunteers
- 3rd Cavalry Regiment (United States)
- 3rd Indiana Volunteers (Mexican-American War)
- 3rd U.S. Dragoons
- 4th Indiana Volunteers
- 4th Infantry Regiment (United States)
- 5th Indiana Volunteers
- 11th Infantry Regiment (United States)
- 155th Infantry Regiment (United States)
- Army of Occupation (Mexico)
- Army of the West (1846)
- Batallón de San Blas
- California Battalion
- First Regiment of Texas Mounted Rifle Volunteers
- Jeffersonville Quartermaster Depot
- List of United States military and volunteer units in the Mexican–American War
- Mexican Hussars
- Mississippi Rifles (Mexican–American War)
- Pacific Squadron
- Palmetto Regiment
- Regiment of Voltigeurs and Foot Riflemen
- Saint Patrick's Battalion
- United States Army Corps of Engineers
- United States Volunteers

=== Mormon Battalion ===
- Cooke's Wagon Road
- Fort Moore (California)
- Mormon Battalion
- Mormon Battalion Historic Site
- Mormon Battalion Monument (Presidio Park, San Diego)
- Mormon Battalion Monument (Salt Lake City)
- Mormon Battalion Monument (Sandoval County, New Mexico)
- Old Custom House (Monterey, California)
- Salt Lake Cutoff
- Tragedy Spring

== Warships of the United States ==
- Potomac-class frigate
- Libertad (1847 schooner)
- Washington (1837 ship)
- USS Admittance
- USS Allegheny (1847)
- USS Boston (1825)
- USS Brandywine
- USS Columbus (1819)
- USS Congress (1841)
- USS Cumberland (1842)
- USS Cyane (1837)
- USS Dale (1839)
- USS Decatur (1839)
- USS Erie (1813)
- USS Falmouth
- USRC Forward (1842)
- USS Fredonia
- USS Germantown (1846)
- USS Hecla (1846)
- USS Independence (1814)
- USS Iris (1847)
- USS Jamestown (1844)
- USS John Adams (1799)
- USS Lawrence (1843)
- USS Levant
- USS Lexington (1825)
- USS Massachusetts (1845)
- USS Mississippi (1841)
- USS Morris (1846 schooner)
- USS Morris (1846b)
- USS Nautilus (1838)
- USS North Carolina (1820)
- USS Ohio (1820)
- USS Perry (1843)
- USS Petrita
- USS Phoenix (1841)
- USS Plymouth (1844)
- USS Porpoise (1836)
- USS Portsmouth (1843)
- USS Preble (1839)
- USS Raritan (1843)
- USS Reefer
- USS Relief (1836)
- USS Saranac (1848)
- USS Saratoga (1842)
- USS Savannah (1842)
- USS Scorpion (1847)
- USS Somers (1842)
- USS Spitfire (1846)
- USS St. Mary's (1844)
- USS Stromboli (1846)
- USS Supply (1846)
- USS Truxtun (1842)
- USS Union (1846)
- USS Vandalia (1828)
- USS Vesuvius (1846)
- USS Vincennes (1826)
- USS Vixen (1846)
- USS Warren (1827)
- USS Water Witch (1847)

== Places ==
- Alamo Mission
- Camp Belknap (military camp) - (1846)
- Cahuenga Pass
- Gunter Hotel
- Jefferson Barracks Military Post
- Manga de Clavo
- Monterey, California
- Nueces Strip
- Olompali, California
- Pueblo de Los Ángeles
- Rancho Arroyo Seco
- Rancho Laguna de San Antonio
- Rancho San Pedro
- Río Frío de Juárez
- Sonoma, California

=== Forts ===
- Fort Adams
- Fort Bridger
- Fort Brown - Texas post, first known as Fort Texas.
- Fort Buenaventura
- Fort Kearny
- Fort Leavenworth
- Fort Lincoln, Texas
- Fort Moore (California)
- Fort Okanogan
- Fort Vancouver
- Fort Vasquez

=== Memorials and historic sites ===
- Bear Flag Monument
- Campo de Cahuenga
- Gunter Hotel
- List of Mexican–American War monuments and memorials
- Mexico City National Cemetery
- Mission San Francisco Solano
- Mission San Rafael Arcángel
- Monumento a los Niños Héroes
- Mormon Battalion Historic Site
- Mormon Battalion Monument (Presidio Park, San Diego)
- Mormon Battalion Monument (Salt Lake City)
- Mormon Battalion Monument (Sandoval County, New Mexico)
- Palo Alto Battlefield National Historical Park
- Resaca de la Palma Battlefield
- San Pasqual Battlefield Monument
- San Pasqual Battlefield State Historic Park
- Santa Clara Campaign Treaty Site
- Sonoma Barracks
- Sonoma Plaza
- Sutter's Fort
- Tragedy Spring

== Equipment ==
- List of weapons of the Mexican–American War
- Model 1840 Cavalry Saber

== Cultural ==
- Flag of California
- Mexican standoff

=== Books ===
- Bibliography of the Mexican American War

==== Non-fiction ====
- The War with Mexico - (1919) - history by Justin Harvey Smith.

==== Fiction ====
- Bivouac of the Dead - poem by Theodore O'Hara honouring the American dead.
- Caballero: A Historical Novel - (1996) - novel by Jovita González and Eve Raleigh.
- Fearless, A Novel of Sarah Bowman - (1998) - novel by Lucia St. Clair Robson.
- Gone for Soldiers - (2000) - novel by Jeffrey Shaara.
- Jack Tier - (1848) - novel by James Fenimore Cooper.
- The Present Crisis - (1845) - antiwar poem by James Russell Lowell.
- Vampires of El Norte - (2023) - novel by Isabel Cañas.

=== Films ===
- California (1963 film) - (1963) - 1963 film by Hamil Petroff.
- The Cemetery of the Eagles - (1939) - 1939 Mexican film.
- Frontier Uprising - (1961) - 1961 film by Edward L. Cahn.
- Kit Carson (1940 film) - (1940) - 1940 American film.
- North and South (miniseries) - (1985–1994) - three American television miniseries.
- One Man's Hero - (1999) - film about the Saint Patrick's Battalion.
- Ravenous (1999 film) - (1999)
- The Sign of the Coyote - (1963)

== Miscellaneous ==
- USS Union (1846) - wrecked off Baja California in 1846.

== See also ==
- Bibliography of the Mexican American War
- Timeline of the Mexican American War
- Mexico–United States border
- Mexico–United States relations
- Republic of Texas–United States relations
- Nueces Strip
- Texan raids on New Mexico (1843)
- Compromise of 1850
- Reconquista (Mexico)
- List of United States invasions of Latin American countries
