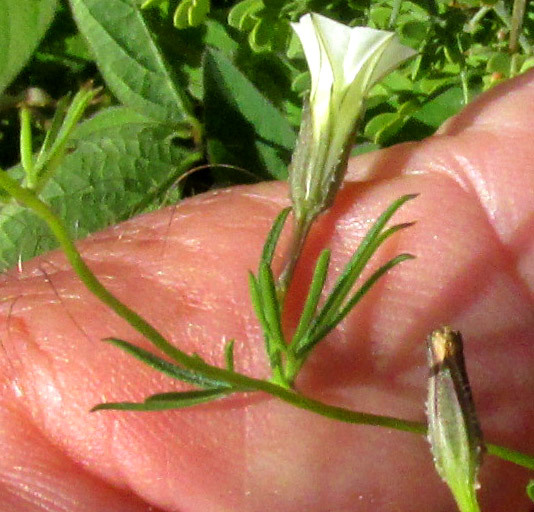
- Ipomoea costellata flowering head

Scientific classification
- Kingdom: Plantae
- Clade: Tracheophytes
- Clade: Angiosperms
- Clade: Eudicots
- Clade: Asterids
- Order: Solanales
- Family: Convolvulaceae
- Genus: Ipomoea
- Species: I. costellata

Binomial name
- Ipomoea costellata Torr.

Synonyms
- Convolvulus digitatus Sessé & Moc.; Convolvulus pedatus Sessé & Moc.; Ipomoea futilis A.Nelson; Ipomoea painteri House; Ipomoea pusilla Brandegee

= Ipomoea costellata =

Species of flowering plant

Ipomoea costellata, sometimes called crestrib morning-glory, is a species of annual plant belonging to the Family Convolvulaceae

== Description ==
Unlike many morning glory species, the herbaceous stems of Ipomoea costellata usually trail along the ground for up to about 1.5 meters (5 feet) without rooting at their nodes; they twine only near their tips and only rarely grow erect. Beyond that, the species is so unusual that within its distribution area the few following features may distinguish it from other Ipomoea species:

- Leaves are deeply lobed like fingers on a hand — "palmately lobed".
- Flowers are relatively small, only up to 12 mm (1/2 in) long
- Corollas are shaped like funnels, not with a slender tube suddenly flaring at the top; in the US, corollas are pale lavender to pink, but in Mexico they can be yellowish white or violet-blue.
- Peduncles are hairless or nearly so.

== Distribution ==
In the US, Ipomoea costellata is native only to the southestern states of Arizona, New Mexico and Texas. Mainly it's a Mexican extentending south into Guatemala and Honduras, and is introduced in Venezuela in South America.

== Habitat ==
In the US, Ipomoea costellata occurs in chaparral, oak forest, among Ponderosa Pines and rocky areas. It occurs between 100 and 2200 meters in elevation (~330–7220 feet).

In highland central Mexico, it's common on sloping terrain with grasslands, xerophytic scrubland, tropical deciduous forests, as well as the corresponding disturbed, secondary vegetation, at elevations up to 2100 meters high (~6900 feet).

== Taxonomy ==
Ipomoea costellata was one of many species first scientifically collected during the United States and Mexican Boundary Survey of 1848 to 1855, meant to determine the Mexico-US border as defined by the Treaty of Guadalupe Hidalgo. In 1859 when John Torrey described and named Ipomoea costellata, he referred to the collections Charles Wright, #505 and 1615, collected during the Survey, remarking that they were found "On the Rio Grande, from the mouth of Pecos to El Paso, and near the Copper Mines of New Mexico."

In Mexico, often Ipomoea costellata has been identified as I. painteri on the basis of corolla color. Now I. painteri is considered a synonym. In southern Mexico it's said to resemble Ipomoea capillacea, Ipomoea leptotoma and Ipomoea pedatisecta.

=== Variety edwardsensis ===
Ipomoea costellata var. edwardsensis, endemic to about six counties of the Edwards Plateau region of southwestern Texas, differs from the broader species by having shorter peduncles equaling the length of the petiole, and white corollas whose fewer and deeper lobes spread at right angles when the blossom is fully developed; as Robert O'Kennon and Guy L. Nesom expressed in their formal Latin description in 2002, "Differt a I. costellatae Torrey sensu lato pedunculis brevioribus longitudine petiolum aequantibus et corollis albis rotatis lobis paucioribus profundioribus."

=== Phylogeny ===
Ipomoea costellata belongs to a small, well-defined clade of seven species centered in Mexico and assigned the name Pedatisecta; species in the clade are characterized by palmately divided leaves.

=== Etymology ===
The genus name Ipomoea is derived from the Greek ipos or ips, meaning "to entwine", and homoios, meaning "similar", a construction alluding to the twining habit of species in the genus.

The species name costellata is from the Latin costatus with costa meaning "rib", and the suffix ata serving as a plural suffix; thus costellata means "ribs". When John Torrey described Ipomoea costellata, with regard to the calyx he wrote "... the exterior sepals more or less conspicuously carinate or even winged... "; the technical term "carinate" means "having a ridge", which on a calyx is close enough to having a rib.

== Gallery ==
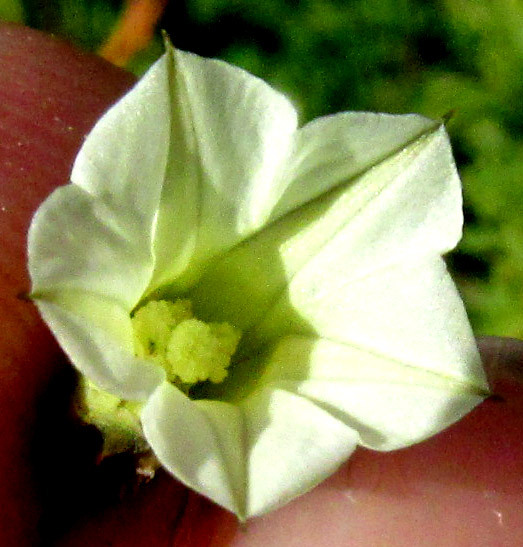
Ipomoea costellata flower from above

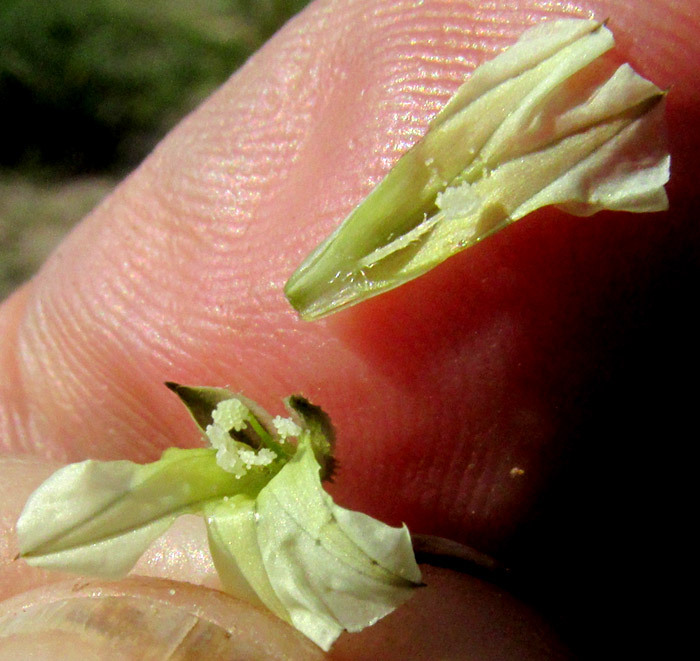
Ipomoea costellata dissected flower

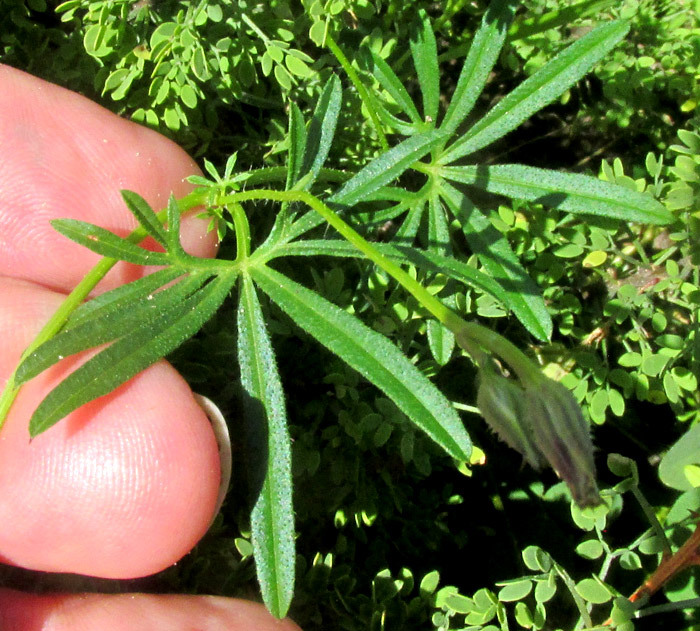
Ipomoea costellata deeply palmately lobed leaves

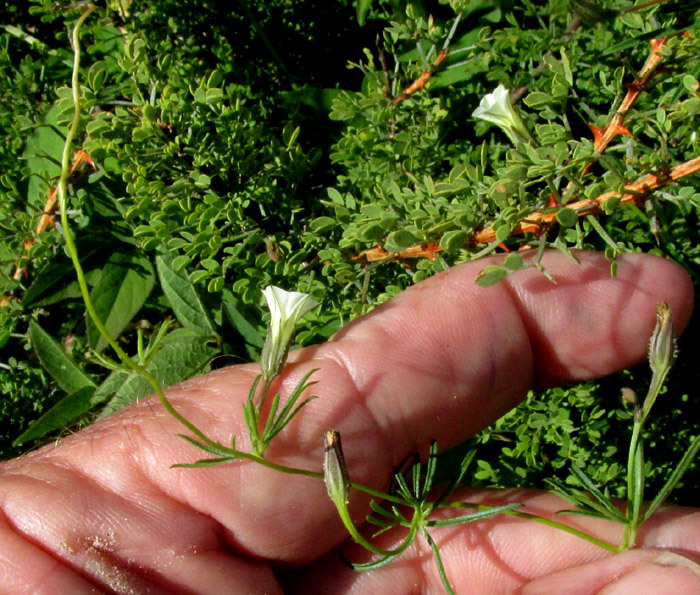
Ipomoea costellata flowering stem tip in habitat
