= List of Mexican–American War monuments and memorials =

This is a list of monuments and memorials that were established as public displays and symbols of the Mexican–American War of 1846–1848 and its veterans on both sides. One of the most significant is the Mexico City National Cemetery, one of the first U.S. national cemeteries. The U.S. did not start its official system of national cemeteries until an 1862 act of Congress authorized U.S. President Abraham Lincoln to proceed. However, on September 28, 1850, an American military cemetery was established in Mexico City in the aftermath of the Mexican–American War.

Other monuments and memorials in Mexico commemorate those lost in the Mexican side of the conflict, particularly the Niños Héroes, seven army cadets who lost their lives defending Chapultepec Castle in Mexico City. There are other monuments in Mexico City, and in Monterrey, Nogales, Puebla, San Miguel de Cozumel, and Toluca de Lerdo.

In the United States, "conspicuously missing" is any memorial to the Mexican–American War on the National Mall in Washington, D.C. But there are monuments in California, Indiana, Kentucky, Maryland, Mississippi, New York, Pennsylvania, South Carolina, Tennessee, Texas, and Utah.

== Mexico ==
Helen Escobedo in the book Mexican Monuments: Strange Encounters notes:

Literally hundreds of monuments commemorate the Niños Héroes, the seven boys who defended the castle of Chapultepec alone against the American invasion in 1847. According to legend the last one alive wrapped himself in the Mexican flag and jumped off the parapet rather than surrender.

=== Mexico City ===
- Mexico City National Cemetery, a U.S. national cemetery located in Colonia San Rafael, (Note: The creation of the Mexico City National Cemetery, approved by U.S. Congress (in acts of 1850 and 1852), preceded the creation of an official system of national cemeteries in 1862 by act of Congress, during the American Civil War. The cemeterywas declared to be a national cemetery in 1873, under responsibility of the War Department to operate and maintain.) created by purchase of land in 1850, "still stands as the only significant effort made by the federal government to recover the remains of any soldiers who lost their lives during the war with Mexico and to memorialize them. Today, this cemetery (reduced in size to a single acre in 1976) forms a tiny oasis of calm in the heart of Mexico City." The purchase was authorized by a September 28, 1850 act of the U.S. Congress, which led to actual purchase on June 21, 1851, of two acres for $3,000. An additional $1734.34 funding to add walls and ditching to the property was appropriated by U.S. Congress on July 21, 1852. A white stone monument's inscription recognizes approximately 750 Americans there who died in the war, mostly nearby, whose bones were reinterred to there. Also in the cemetery are graves of veterans who died and were buried there later, up to 1923. Dead were reinterred from shallow battlefield graves in the region. The cemetery remains under responsibility of the American Battle Monuments Commission.
- Obelisco a los Niños Héroes, a monument to the Niños Héroes This or another Mexico City monument to the Niños Héroes was visited by Harry S. Truman in 1947, in the first visit to Mexico by any U.S. president.
- San Patricios memorial, Plaza San Jacinto, in San Ángel, a suburb of Mexico City, honoring the San Patricios/St. Patrick's Battalion of mostly Irish soldiers who fought for Mexico

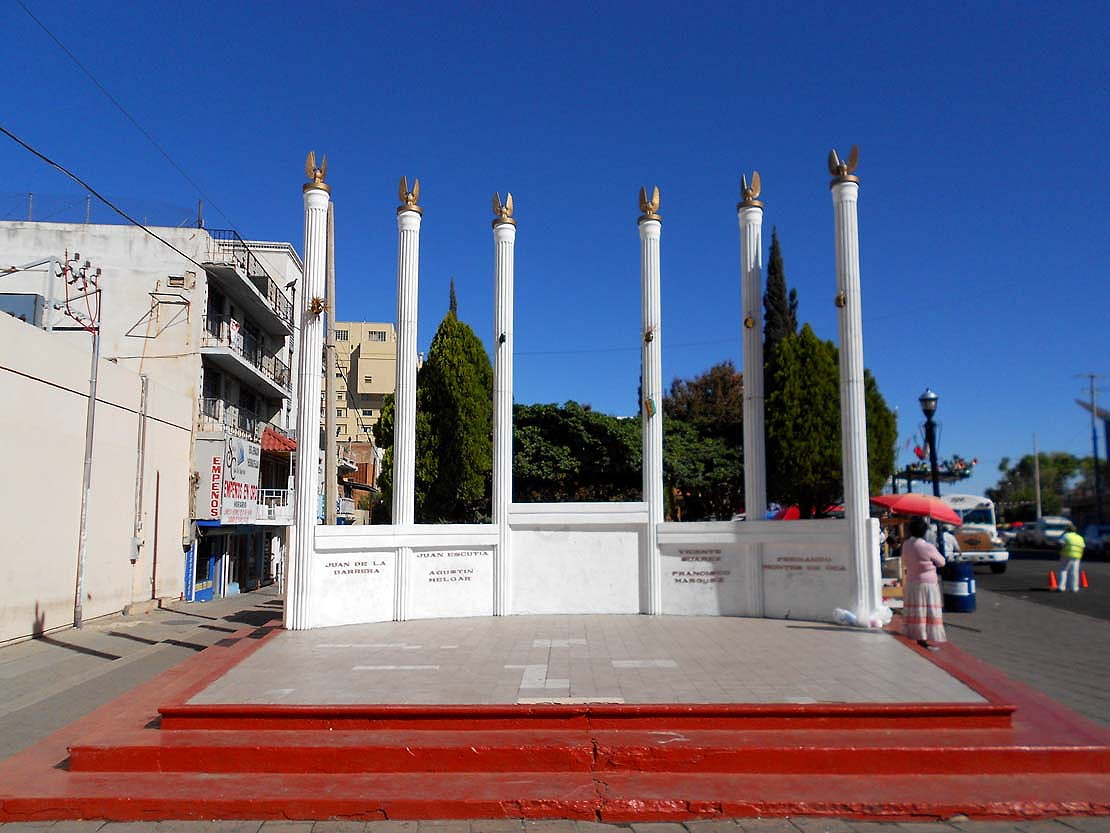
Niños Héroes monument, Nogales, Sonora

50 Saint Patrick's battalion members were officially executed by the U.S. Army.

=== Monterrey ===
The Niños Héroes Park, Monterrey. There is a statue in the park of the six heroes.

=== Nogales ===
- One of the prototype Niños Héroes memorials using six pillars to represent the six martyrs, in Nogales, Sonora.

=== Puebla ===
- Monuments to the Niños Héroes often consist of six pillars, representing the six cadets killed. Sometimes there is a statue in the middle. This is the case in this monument, where a statue of the Mexican eagle is placed with three pillars on each side.

=== San Miguel de Cozumel ===
- Mexican War Memorial, an obelisk,

=== Toluca de Lerdo ===
- This stone monument portraying a dead cadet wrapped in the Mexican flag is locally referred to as "The drunken lad" or "The bed of stone."

== United States ==
=== California ===
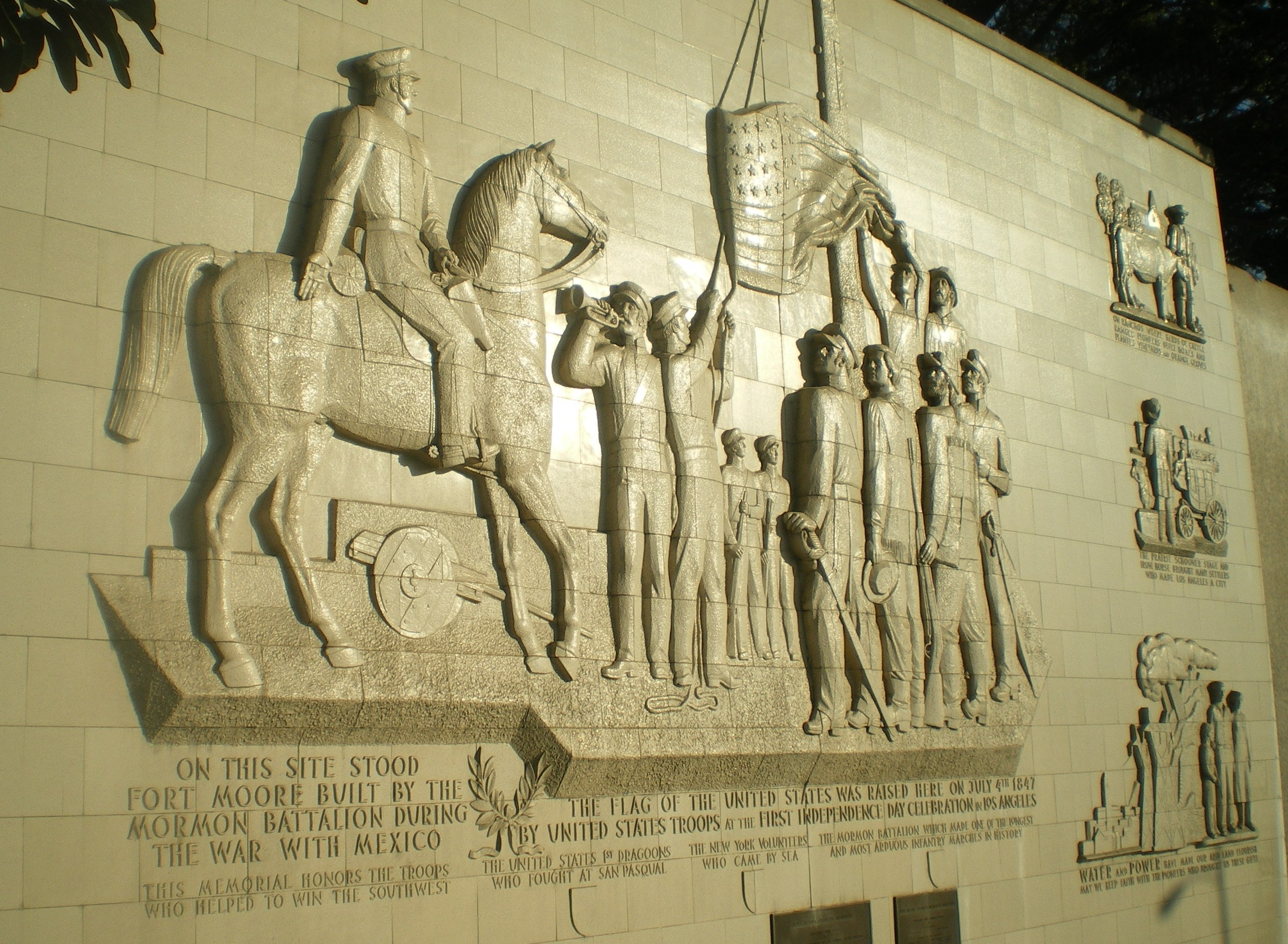
Fort Moore Pioneer Memorial

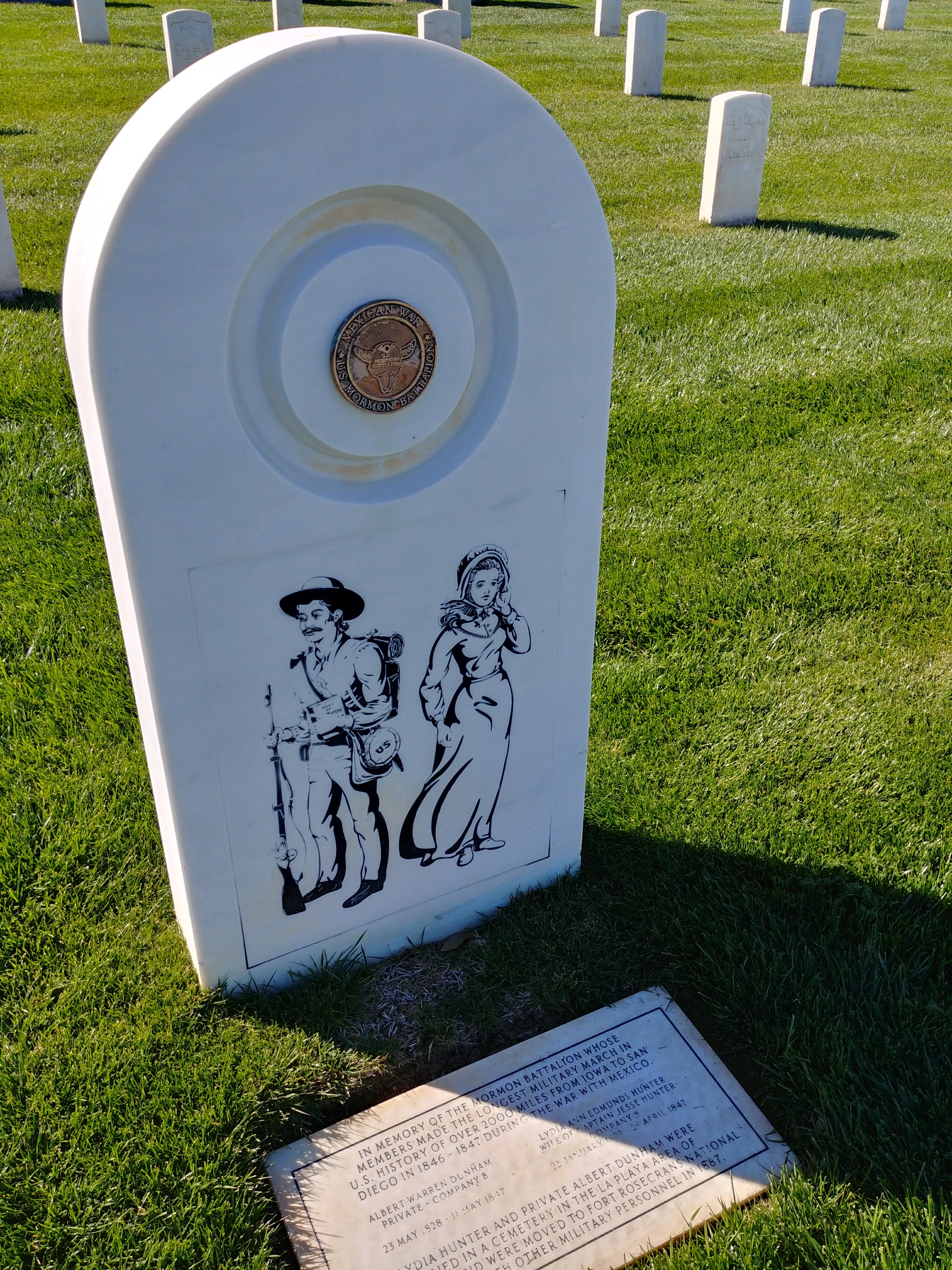
Mormon Battalion memorial, Fort Rosecrans National Cemetery

- Bear Flag Monument, Sonoma, dedicated June 14, 1914, includes the inscription, "THIS MONUMENT WAS ERECTED BY THE NATIVE SONS OF THE GOLDEN WEST AND THE STATE OF CALIFORNIA TO COMMEMORATE THE RAISING OF THE BEAR FLAG ON THIS SPOT ON JUNE 14 1846 BY THE BEAR FLAG PARTY AND THEIR DECLARATION OF THE FREEDOM OF CALIFORNIA FROM MEXICAN RULE. ON JULY 9 1846."
- Fort Moore Pioneer Memorial, Albert Stewart and Henry Kreis, sculptors, Los Angeles, (dedicated July 3, 1957)
- The Mormon Battalion Memorial in Fort Rosecrans National Cemetery, Point Loma, San Diego, erected in 1998.
- San Pasqual Battlefield Monument, near Escondido: plaque and bas relief.
- Capt. Thomas Fallon statue, San Jose, California, which became controversial.
- Mormon Battalion Monument, Presidio Park, San Diego. Edward J. Fraughton, sculptor, (dedicated November 22, 1969

=== Indiana ===
- Mexican War Memorial at Mt Hope Cemetery, Logansport, Indiana

=== Kentucky ===
- Kentucky War Memorial, in Frankfort Cemetery in Frankfort, Kentucky, was funded by $15,000 appropriated by a Kentucky state legislature act of February 25, 1848.
- Salt River Tigers – Mexican War Monument, on courthouse lawn, Lawrenceburg, Anderson County, Kentucky
- Bourbon County Mexican War Veterans Monument, Paris Cemetery, Paris, Bourbon County, Kentucky
- Mexican War Veterans Monument, Battle Grove Cemetery, Cynthiana, Harrison County, Kentucky
- Colonel William R. McKee Monument, Main Street, Midway, Woodford County, Kentucky The monument is a fluted column topped by an urn, with inscription written by Theodore O'Hara, author of The Bivouac of the Dead, famous poem written after the Battle of Buena Vista in which McKee was killed. Poem used in many U.S. Civil War memorials. Monument included in Midway Historic District.
- Memorial to General William Orlando Butler (War of 1812, Mexican War) in Butler Family Cemetery, General Butler State Park

=== Maryland ===
- Watson Monument, Edward Berge, sculptor (1903)
- Mexican War Midshipmen's Monument, U.S. Naval Academy, Annapolis, Maryland

=== Mississippi ===
- War Memorial Building, Jackson, Mississippi, a Mississippi Landmark. Includes a panel commemorating the Battle of Buena Vista and panels for Jefferson Davis and for John A. Quitman

=== New Mexico ===
- Mormon Battalion Monument, 32 miles north of Albuquerque, 1940.

=== New York ===
- Mexican American War Memorial at Soldiers Walk Memorial Park, at West Point Military Academy, New York
- Mexican War Memorial, Bronx, New York
- General Worth Monument, Madison Square Park

=== Pennsylvania ===
- Mexican War Monument, Harrisburg, Hamilton Alricks Jr. and John McFadden, sculptors, (1867–1869)
- Mexican War Memorial, Philadelphia
- Mexican War Streets Historic District, neighborhood in Pittsburgh

=== Tennessee ===
There may be just two significant monuments to the Mexican–American War in Tennessee:

- Mexican War Memorial, Gallatin City Cemetery, Gallatin, Tennessee
- Mexican–American War Memorial, Lawrenceburg, Tennessee

=== Texas ===
- Mexican–American War Memorial, Texas State Capitol, Austin, Texas. Bronze plaque stating "In Memory of the Officers of the United States Army Who Fell in the War with Mexico", and listing 141 officers. Installed in 1910 by National Society of Colonial Dames in the south entrance foyer of the building. The Battle of Palo Alto is commemorated by letters in marble floor below.
- Mexican War Memorial, Veterans Park, College Station, Texas, with sculpture by J. Payne Lara.
- Mexican War Veterans memorial, unveiled 2014, Corpus Christi, Texas
- Palo Alto Battlefield National Historical Park

=== Utah ===
- Mormon Battalion Monument, Utah State Capitol, Salt Lake City (Gilbert Riswold, sculptor, 1927)

== Related monuments and memorials ==
There are also monuments and memorials relating to the Texas Revolution (1835–36), which preceded the Mexican–American War by a decade.

== See also ==
- List of Confederate monuments and memorials
- List of Union Civil War monuments and memorials
