= All of Mexico Movement =

Movement for the annexation of Mexico by the U.S.

The All of Mexico Movement, or All Mexico Movement, was a United States expansionist movement during the Mexican–American War that advocated the annexation of the entire territory of Mexico into the United States. It emerged from expansionist interpretations of Manifest Destiny and gained attention after major U.S. military successes in 1847, but it remained controversial and never obtained sufficient political support for adoption.

Supporters presented annexation as a means of extending American republican institutions and, in some cases, as an anti-slavery measure. Opponents objected to the political and racial consequences of incorporating millions of Mexicans into the United States. The movement declined after the Treaty of Guadalupe Hidalgo in 1848, which ended the war and transferred northern Mexican territories to the United States without annexing Mexico as a whole.

== Background ==
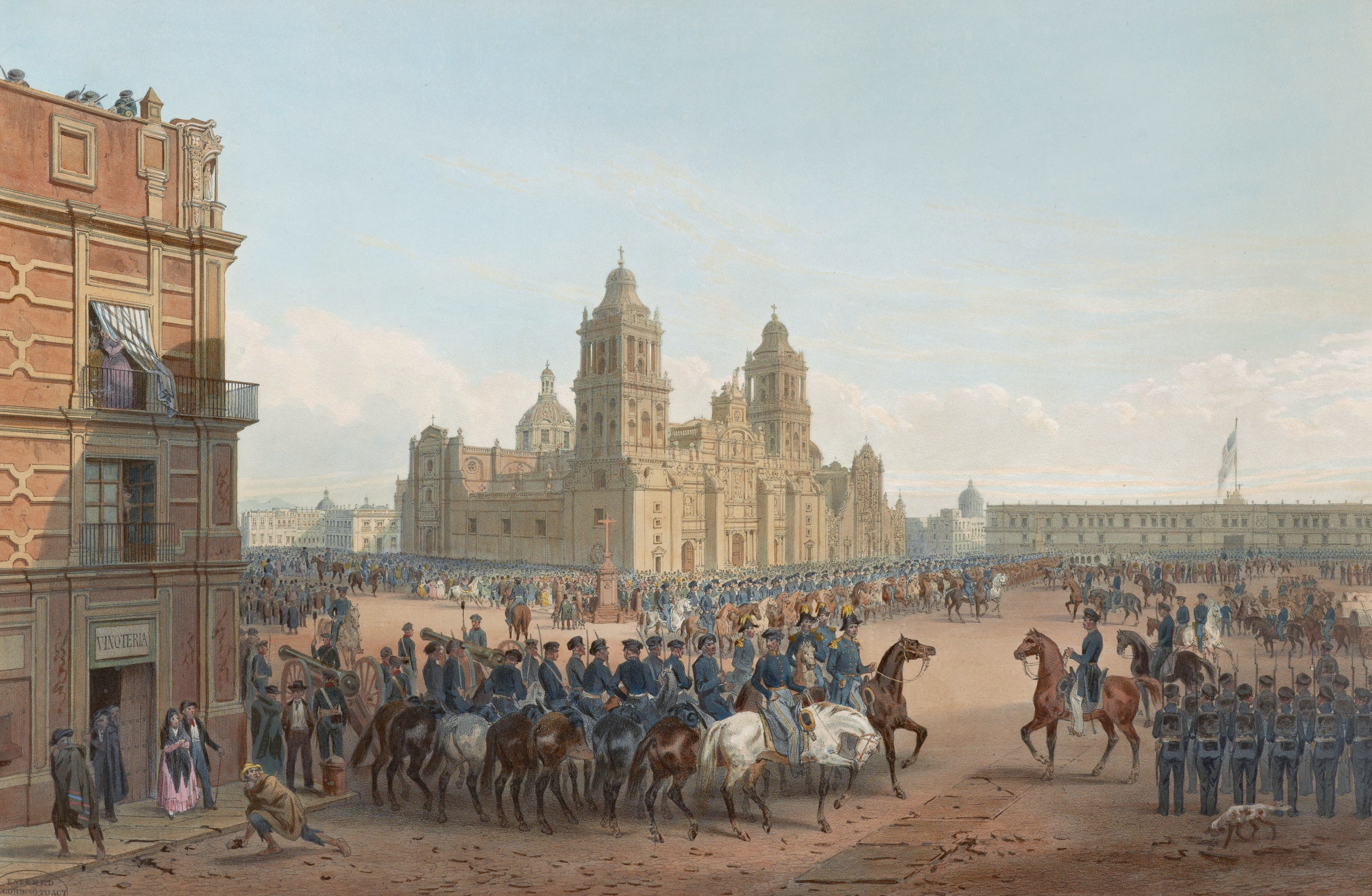
American troops led by Winfield Scott entering the Plaza de la Constitución

Before U.S. President James K. Polk took office in 1845, Congress approved the annexation of Texas by joint resolution. After annexation, relations between the United States and Mexico remained tense over the disputed boundary of Texas: Mexico maintained that the boundary lay at the Nueces River, while Texas and the United States claimed the Rio Grande. Polk ordered U.S. troops under Zachary Taylor into the disputed territory, and a clash between Mexican and U.S. forces in late April 1846 provided the immediate occasion for the Mexican–American War.

U.S. military success in 1847, culminating later that year in the occupation of Mexico City, encouraged calls among some expansionists for the annexation of all Mexico.

== Debate ==
The proposal to annex all of Mexico was controversial. Some advocates of Manifest Destiny, including John L. O'Sullivan, framed American expansion as a of voluntary accession and republican self-government rather than direct imperial conquest. The debate also brought racial assumptions within Manifest Destiny to the forefront. Annexing all of Mexico raised the question of whether millions of Mexicans would be incorporated into the United States as citizens, an issue that opponents used to argue that Mexicans were racially unfit for equal incorporation into the United States.

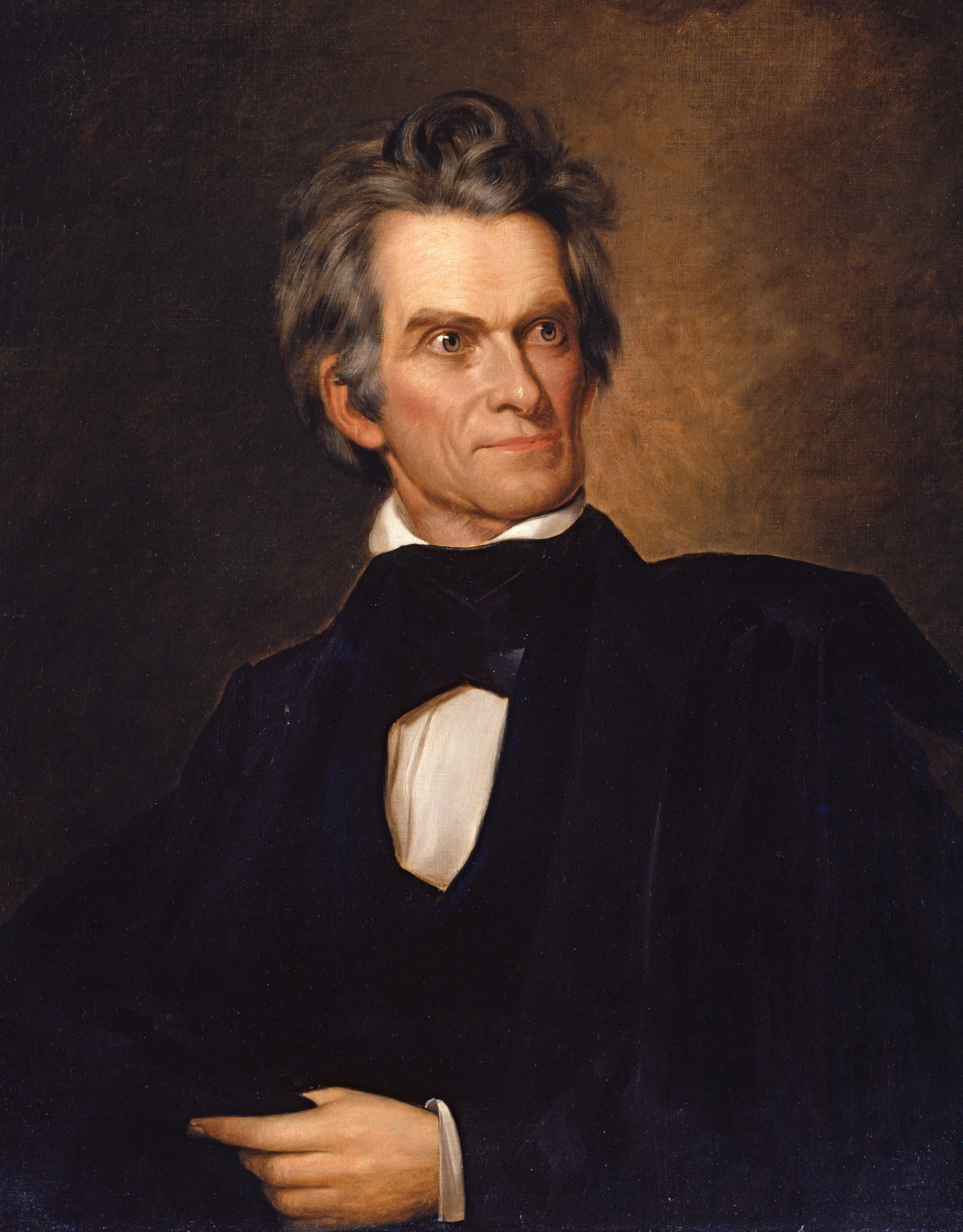
John C. Calhoun, who opposed the movement on white supremacist grounds

An example of this identity-based and white supremacist position was that of John C. Calhoun, Senator from South Carolina, former vice president and future spokesperson for southern secession, in which, in his own words in a speech to Congress on January 4, 1848, he explained that: [We] have never dreamt of incorporating into our Union any but the Caucasian race the free white race. To incorporate Mexico, would be the very first instance of the kind of incorporating an Indian race; for more than half of the Mexicans are Indians, and the other is composed chiefly of mixed tribes. I protest against such a union as that! Ours, sir, is the Government of a white race.

Expansionists that supported annexation responded to these objections by presenting the war as a means of "regenerating" Mexico through the extension of American political and social institutions southward. Some supporters also regarded annexation as an anti-slavery measure. Many Americans also concerned by Mexico's Catholicism, weak republicanism, and threat of an upsurge in nationalism. Annexationist arguments, however, often rested on the assumption that Mexicans would be displaced, subordinated, or gradually replaced by Anglo-American settlers.

== Outcome ==
In 1848, the Mexican Cession added the territories of Alta California and Nuevo México to the United States. The annexation movement declined afterward as the US achieved major territorial expansion without annexing Mexico as a whole.

The historian Frederick Merk, in Manifest Destiny and Mission in American History: A Reinterpretation (1963), argued that the failure of the All of Oregon and All of Mexico movements indicates that expansion was not as popular as historians have traditionally portrayed it to have been. Merk wrote that belief in the beneficent mission of democracy was central to American history, but aggressive "continentalism" was an aberration supported by only a minority of Americans, mostly Democrats, but opposed by Whigs and some Democrats. Thus, Louisiana Democrats opposed the annexation of Mexico, while those in Mississippi supported it.

== See also ==
- Bibliography of the Mexican American War
- Timeline of the Mexican American War
- Outline of the Mexican American War
- Golden Circle
- Amexica, the merging of the US and Mexico
- Mexifornia
- Reconquista (Mexico)
