= United States declaration of war on Mexico =

- Long title: "An Act providing for the Prosecution of the existing War between the United States and the Republic of Mexico."
- Enacted by: the 29th United States Congress
- Effective: May 13, 1846

Citations
- Statutes at Large: 9 Stat. 9

Major amendments
- Amended by subsequent legislation, 9 Stat. 17

On May 13, 1846, the United States Congress passed An Act providing for the Prosecution of the existing War between the United States and the Republic of Mexico, thereby declaring war against Mexico. The declaration resulted in the Mexican–American War (1846–48). The act laid out regulations for the size and organization of the militia to participate in the war, how they were to be recruited, and the amount of money appropriated for the war—10 million dollars. The act was amended on June 18, 1846 (9 Stat. 17) to clarify and expand the organizational structure provided for by the original law.

== Declaration of war text ==
Whereas, by the act of the Republic of Mexico, a state of war exists between that Government and the United States:

Be it enacted by the Senate and House of Representatives of the United States of America in Congress assembled, That, for the purpose of enabling the government of the United States to prosecute said war to a speedy and successful termination, the President be, and he is hereby, authorized to employ the militia, naval, and military forces of the United States, and to call for and accept the services of any number of volunteers, not exceeding fifty thousand, who may offer their services, either as cavalry, artillery, infantry, or riflemen, to serve twelve months after they shall have arrived at the place of rendezvous, or to the end of the war, unless sooner discharged, according to the time for which they shall have been mustered into service; and that the sum of ten millions of dollars, out of any moneys in the treasury, or to come into the treasury, not otherwise appropriated, be, and the same is hereby, appropriated for the purpose of carrying the provisions of this act into effect.

SEC. 2. And be it further enacted, That the militia, when called into the service of the United States by virtue of this act, or any other act, may, if in the opinion of the President of the United States the public interest requires it, be compelled to serve for a term not exceeding six months after their arrival at the place of rendezvous, in any one year, unless sooner discharged.

SEC. 3. And be it further enacted, That the said volunteers shall furnish their own clothes, and if cavalry, their own horses and horse equipments; and when mustered into service shall be armed at the expense of the United States.

SEC. 4. And be it further enacted, That said volunteers shall, when called into actual service, and while remaining therein, be subject to the rules and articles of war, and shall be, in all respects except as to clothing and pay, placed on the same footing with similar corps of the United States army; and in lieu of clothing every non-commissioned officer and private in any company, who may thus offer himself, shall be entitled, when called into actual service, to receive in money a sum equal to the cost of clothing of a non-commissioned officer or private (as the case may be) in the regular troops of the United States.

SEC 5. And be it further enacted, That the said volunteers so offering their services shall be accepted by the President in companies, battalions, squadrons, and regiments, whose officers shall be appointed in the manner prescribed by law in the several States and Territories to which such companies, battalions, squadrons, and regiments, shall respectively belong.

SEC. 6. And be it further enacted, That the President of the United States be, and he is hereby, authorized to organize companies so tendering their service into battalions or squadrons, battalions and squadrons into regiments, regiments into brigades, and brigades into divisions, as soon as the number of volunteers shall render such organization, in his judgment, expedient; and the President shall, if necessary, apportion the staff, field, and general officers among the respective States and Territories from which the volunteers shall tender their services as he may deem proper.

SEC 7. And be it further enacted, That the volunteers who may be received into the service of the United States by virtue of the provisions of this act, and who shall be wounded or otherwise disabled in the service, shall be entitled to all the benefit which may be conferred on persons wounded in the service of the United States.

SEC 8. And be it further enacted, That the President of the United States be, and he is hereby, authorized forthwith to complete all the public armed vessels now authorized by law, and to purchase or charter, arm, equip, and man, such merchant vessels and steam boats as, upon examination, may be found fit, or easily converted into armed vessels fit for the public service, and in such number as he may deem necessary for the protection of the seaboard, lake coast, and the general defense of the country.

SEC. 9. And be it further enacted, That whenever the militia or volunteers are called and received into the service of the United States, under the provisions of this act, they shall have the organization of the army of the United States, and shall have the same pay and allowances; and all mounted privates, non-commissioned officers, musicians, and artificers, shall be allowed 40 cents per day for the use and risk of their horses, except of horses actually killed in action; and if any mounted volunteer, private, non-commissioned officer, musician, or artificer, shall not keep himself provided with a serviceable horse, the said volunteer shall serve on foot.

APPROVED, May 13, 1846.

== See also ==
- Bibliography of the Mexican American War
- Timeline of the Mexican American War
- Outline of the Mexican American War
