= Mexican Cession =

Land the U.S. acquired from Mexico following the war in 1848

Mexican Cession Cesión mexicana
- Expansion of the United States
- 1846–1849
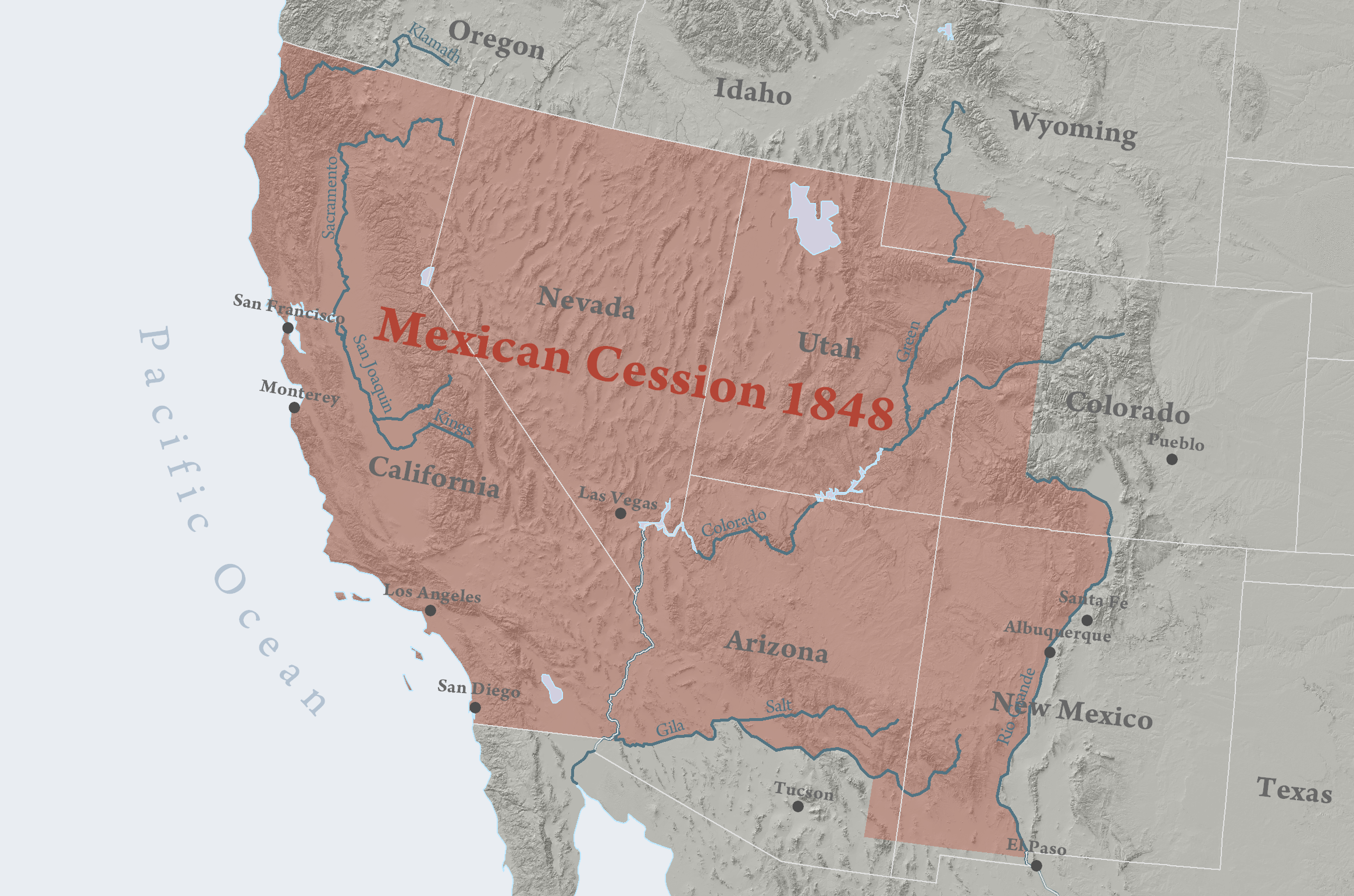
- Area of the Mexican Cession, not including Texan claims, consisting of the present-day states of California, Nevada, Utah, most of Arizona, the western half of New Mexico, the western quarter of Colorado, and the southwest corner of Wyoming
- History
  - Established: 1846
  - Disestablished: 1849
Preceded by
Department of the Californias
Alta California
Succeeded by
State of California
Territory of Utah
Territory of Nevada
Territory of Arizona
Territory of New Mexico
- Today part of: United States; California; Nevada; Utah; Arizona; New Mexico; Colorado; Wyoming

The Mexican Cession (Spanish: Cesión mexicana) is the region of territory that Mexico ceded to the United States in the Treaty of Guadalupe Hidalgo in 1848 after the Mexican–American War. It comprises the states of California, Texas, New Mexico, Utah, Nevada, and Arizona, and parts of Colorado, Oklahoma, Kansas, and Wyoming in the present-day Western United States. Consisting of roughly 529,000 square miles (1,370,000 km^{2}), not including Texas, the Mexican Cession was the third-largest acquisition of territory in U.S. history, surpassed only by the 827,000-square-mile (2,140,000 km^{2}) Louisiana Purchase of 1803 and the later 586,000-square-mile (1,520,000 km^{2}) Alaska Purchase from Russia in 1867.

Most of the ceded territory had not been claimed by the Republic of Texas following its de facto independence in the 1836 revolution. Texas had only claimed areas east of the Rio Grande. After annexation into the U.S. and admission as a state in 1845, Texas's southern and western boundaries with the Mexican territory (former Spanish Province) of Santa Fe de Nuevo México had not been defined by the U.S. Most of the ceded area was part of the Mexican province of Alta California (Upper California) while the southeastern strip east of the Rio Grande had been part of the state of Santa Fe de Nuevo México. Mexico had controlled the ceded territories with considerable local autonomy. After the Mexican War of Independence finished in 1821, the area had seen several revolts but the Mexican government sent few troops from central Mexico to suppress them. In 1846, U.S. president James K. Polk sent soldiers to occupy the disputed territory between the Nueces River and the Rio Grande, starting the Mexican–American War. At the war's outbreak, the U.S. conducted a naval landing on Mexico's northeastern coast on the Gulf of Mexico, and advanced into Nuevo México.

The northern boundary of the ceded territories was at the 42nd parallel north of latitude which was originally decided by the Adams–Onís Treaty of 1821 signed by the United States and the Kingdom of Spain in 1821, and was further ratified by the successor independent state of Mexico in 1831 in the Treaty of Limits. The eastern boundary of the Mexican Cession was the former old Texas Republic claim of additional territory to the west. The southern boundary was set by the war-ending peace Treaty of Guadalupe Hidalgo, which followed the Gila River and the original Mexican boundaries between Alta California to the north, and Baja California and the Mexican state of Sonora to the south.

The question of whether future Western states formed out of these 1848 Mexican Cession lands would permit the institution of slavery was a major American political issue in the lead-up to the American Civil War (1861–1865).

== Mexican–American War ==
A map of Mexico, 1835–1846, with revolts against the Centralist Republic of Mexico highlighted.

Alta California and Santa Fe de Nuevo México were captured soon after the start of the war and the last resistance there was subdued in January 1847, but Mexico would not accept the loss of territory. Therefore, during 1847, troops from the United States invaded central Mexico and occupied the Mexican capital of Mexico City, but still no Mexican government was willing to ratify the transfer of the northern territories to the U.S. It was uncertain whether any treaty could be reached. There was even an All of Mexico Movement proposing complete annexation of Mexico among Eastern Democrats but opposed by Southerners like John C. Calhoun who wanted the additional territory for their crops but not the large population of central Mexico.

Eventually Nicholas Trist forged the Treaty of Guadalupe Hidalgo, explicitly redefining the border between Mexico and the United States in early 1848 after President Polk had already attempted to recall him from Mexico as a failure. Although Mexico did not overtly cede any land under the treaty, the redefined border transferred Alta California and Santa Fe de Nuevo México to the control of the United States. Equally important, the new border also acknowledged Mexico's loss of Texas, both the core eastern portion and the western claims, neither of which had been formally recognized by Mexico until that time.

The U.S. Senate approved the treaty, rejecting amendments from Jefferson Davis to also annex most of northeastern Mexico and from Daniel Webster to decline to take Alta California and Santa Fe de Nuevo México. The United States paid $15 million ($482 million in 2016 dollars) for the damage caused by the war in Mexico's territory and agreed to assume $3.25 million in debts to U.S. citizens.

The Mexican Cession as ordinarily understood (i.e. excluding lands claimed by Texas) amounted to 525,000 square miles (1,400,000 km^{2}), or 14.9% of the total area of the current United States. If the disputed western Texas claims are also included, that amounts to a total of 750,000 square miles (1,900,000 km^{2}). If all of Texas is included, since Mexico had not previously acknowledged the loss of any part of Texas, the total area ceded under this treaty comes to 915,000 square miles (2,400,000 km^{2}).

Considering the seizures, including all of Texas, Mexico lost 55% of its pre-1836 territory in the Treaty of Guadalupe Hidalgo. For only 15 years, from 1821 (when Mexican independence was secured) to the Texan Revolt in 1836, the Mexican Cession (excluding Texas) formed approximately 42% of the country of Mexico. Prior to that, it had been a part of the Spanish colony of New Spain for three centuries.

== Subsequent organization and the North–South conflict ==
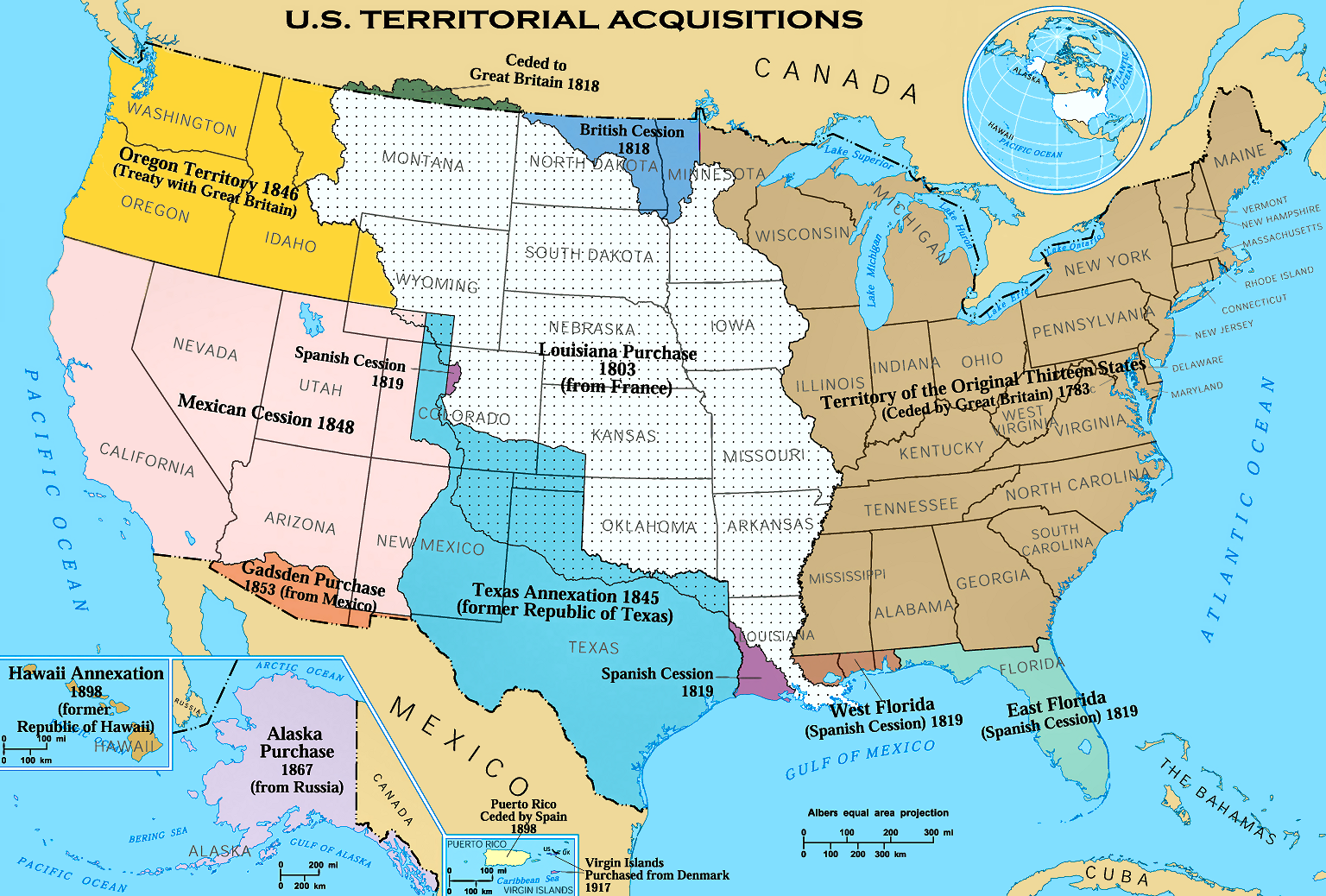
Territorial expansion of the United States; Mexican Cession in pink

Soon after the war started and long before negotiation of the new Mexico–United States border, the question of slavery in the territories to be acquired polarized the Northern and Southern United States in the bitterest sectional conflict up to this time, which lasted for a deadlock of four years, during which the Second Party System broke up, Mormon pioneers settled Utah, the California Gold Rush settled California, and New Mexico-stationed federal troops turned back Texas's attempt to assert control over territory Texas claimed as far west as the Rio Grande. Eventually the Compromise of 1850 preserved the Union, but only for another decade. Proposals included:

- The Wilmot Proviso, which was created by Congressman David Wilmot, banning slavery in any new territory to be acquired from Mexico, not including Texas which had been annexed the previous year. Passed by the United States House of Representatives in August 1846 and February 1847 but not the Senate. Later an effort to attach the proviso to the Treaty of Guadalupe Hidalgo also failed.
- Failed amendments to the Wilmot Proviso by William W. Wick and then Stephen Douglas extending the Missouri Compromise line (36°30' parallel north) west to the Pacific, allowing slavery in most of present-day New Mexico and Arizona, Las Vegas, Nevada, and Southern California, as well as any other territories that might be acquired from Mexico. The line was again proposed by the Nashville Convention of June 1850.
- Popular sovereignty, developed by Lewis Cass and Douglas as the eventual Democratic Party position, letting each territory decide whether to allow slavery.
- William L. Yancey's "Alabama Platform," endorsed by the Alabama and Georgia legislatures and by Democratic state conventions in Florida and Virginia, called for no restrictions on slavery in the territories either by the federal government or by territorial governments before statehood, opposition to any candidates supporting either the Wilmot Proviso or popular sovereignty, and federal legislation overruling Mexican anti-slavery laws.
- General Zachary Taylor, who became the Whig candidate in 1848 and then President from March 1849 to July 1850, proposed after becoming President that the entire area become two free states, called California and New Mexico but much larger than the eventual ones. None of the area would be left as an unorganized or organized territory, avoiding the question of slavery in the territories.
- The Mormons' proposal for a State of Deseret seizing areas from portions of the Mexican Cession but excluding the largest populations in Northern California and central New Mexico was considered unlikely to succeed in Congress, but in 1849 President Taylor sent his agent John Wilson westward with a proposal to combine California and Deseret as a single state, decreasing the number of new free states and the erosion of Southern parity in the Senate, while legitimizing the Church of Jesus Christ of Latter-day Saints.
- Senator Thomas Hart Benton in December 1849 or January 1850: Texas's western and northern boundaries would be the 102nd meridian west and 34th parallel north.
- Senator John Bell (with the assent of Texas) in February 1850: New Mexico would get all Texas land north of the 34th parallel north (including today's Texas Panhandle), and the area to the south (including the southeastern part of today's New Mexico) would be divided at the Colorado River (Texas) into two slave states, balancing the admission of California and New Mexico as free states.
- First draft of the compromise of 1850: Texas's northwestern boundary would be a straight diagonal line from the Rio Grande 20 miles (30 km) north of El Paso to the Red River of the South at the 100th meridian west (the southwestern corner of today's Oklahoma).

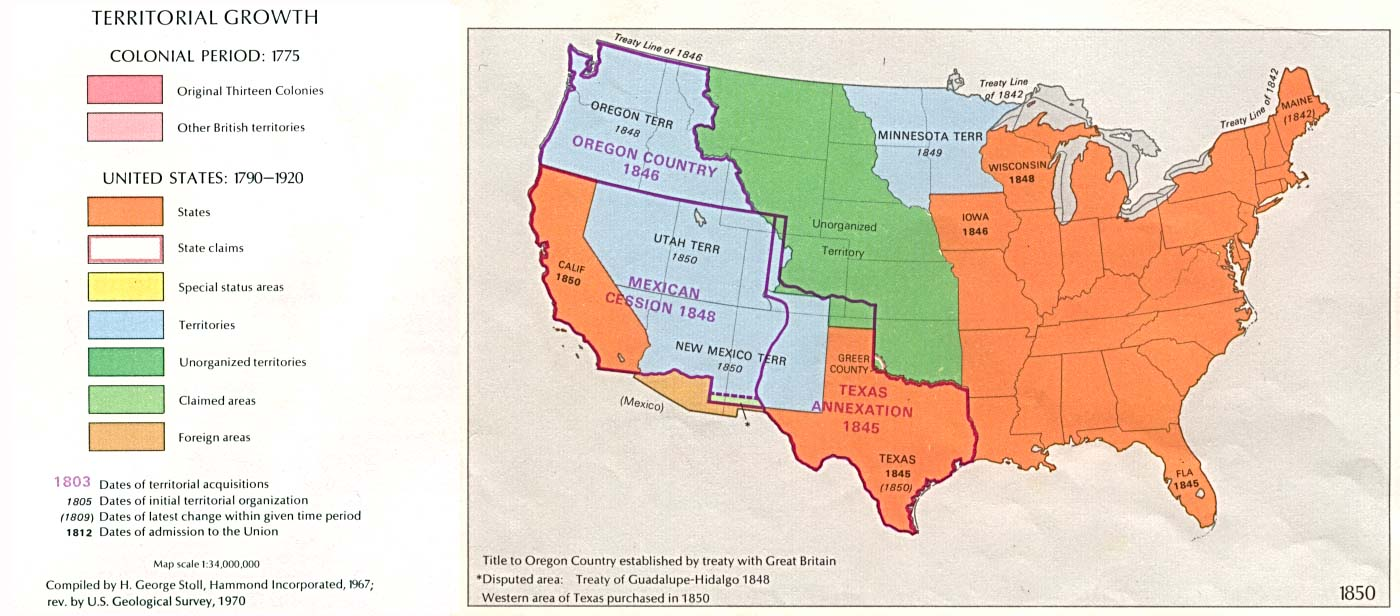
Territory of the United States by 1850

- The Compromise of 1850, proposed by Henry Clay in January 1850, guided to passage by Douglas over Northern Whig and Southern Democrat opposition, and enacted September 1850, admitted California as a free state including Southern California and organized Utah Territory and New Mexico Territory with slavery to be decided by popular sovereignty. Texas dropped its claim to the disputed northwestern areas in return for debt relief, and the areas were divided between the two new territories and unorganized territory. El Paso where Texas had successfully established county government was left in Texas. No southern territory dominated by Southerners (like the later short-lived Confederate Territory of Arizona) was created. Also, the slave trade was abolished in Washington, D.C. (but not slavery itself), and the Fugitive Slave Act was strengthened.

== Gadsden Purchase ==
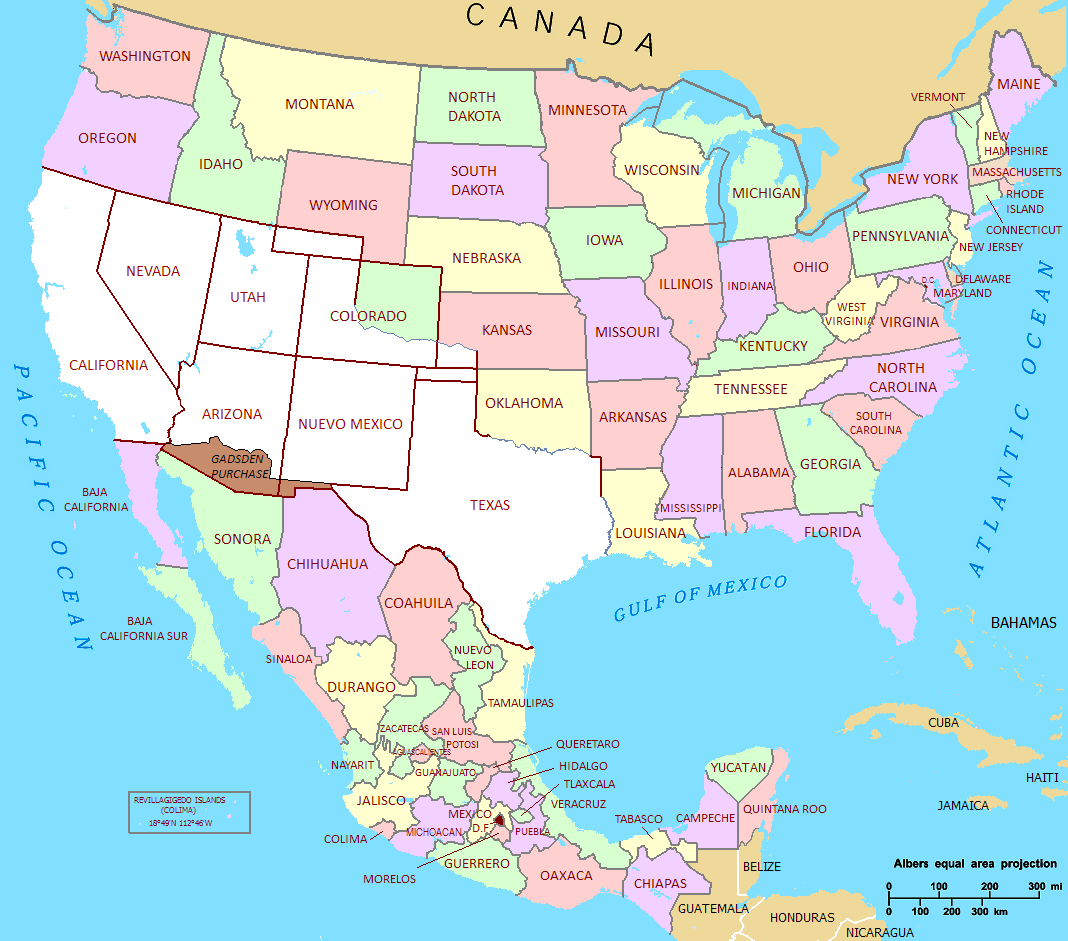
The Mexican Cession agreed with Mexico (white) and the Gadsden Purchase (brown). Part of the area marked as Gadsden Purchase near modern-day Mesilla, New Mexico, was disputed after the Treaty.

It quickly became apparent that the Mexican Cession did not include a feasible route for a transcontinental railroad connecting to a southern port. The topography of the New Mexico Territory included mountains that naturally directed any railroad extending from the southern Pacific coast northward, to Kansas City, St. Louis, or Chicago. Southerners, anxious for the business such a railroad would bring (and hoping to establish a slave state beachhead on the Pacific coast), agitated for the acquisition of railroad-friendly land at the expense of Mexico, thus bringing about the Gadsden Purchase of 1853.

== See also ==
- Bibliography of the Mexican American War
- Timeline of the Mexican American War
- Outline of the Mexican American War
- Bibliography of James K. Polk
- The Zimmermann Telegram, which partly offered Imperial German assistance to Mexico in returning a sizable portion of the Mexican Cession's southern territory, as well as the U.S. state of Texas to Mexico in 1917.
