= Second Battle of Tuxpan =

1847 minor battle of the Mexican-American War

- Part of Mexican–American War
Date	June 1847
Location	Tuxpan, Veracruz
Result	United States victory

Belligerents
United States	Mexico

Commanders and leaders
Matthew C. Perry	Unknown

Strength
Land: unknown marines, sailors, unknown artillery Sea: unknown naval forces	unknown infantry, militia

Casualties and losses
1 killed, 6 wounded	unknown

The Second Battle of Tuxpan was one of the three small battles of the Mexican–American War to occur in Tuxpan, Mexico. The exact date is unknown but was fought between a landing force of Matthew C. Perry's Mosquito Fleet and Mexican soldiers and or militiamen. The engagement resulted in the death of one American sailor and the wounding of six others, two of which were wounded severely. Mexican casualties are unknown. The American occupation and blockade of Tuxpan continued, on June 30, another small skirmish erupted at the town, known as the Third Battle of Tuxpan.
