= United States and Mexican Boundary Survey =

1848–1855 land survey that determined the Mexico–United States border

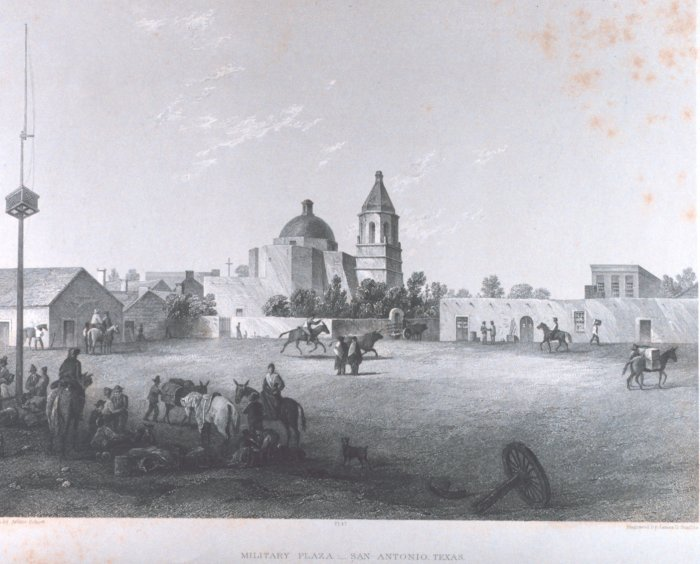
The cover picture of the report detailing military square in San Antonio, Texas

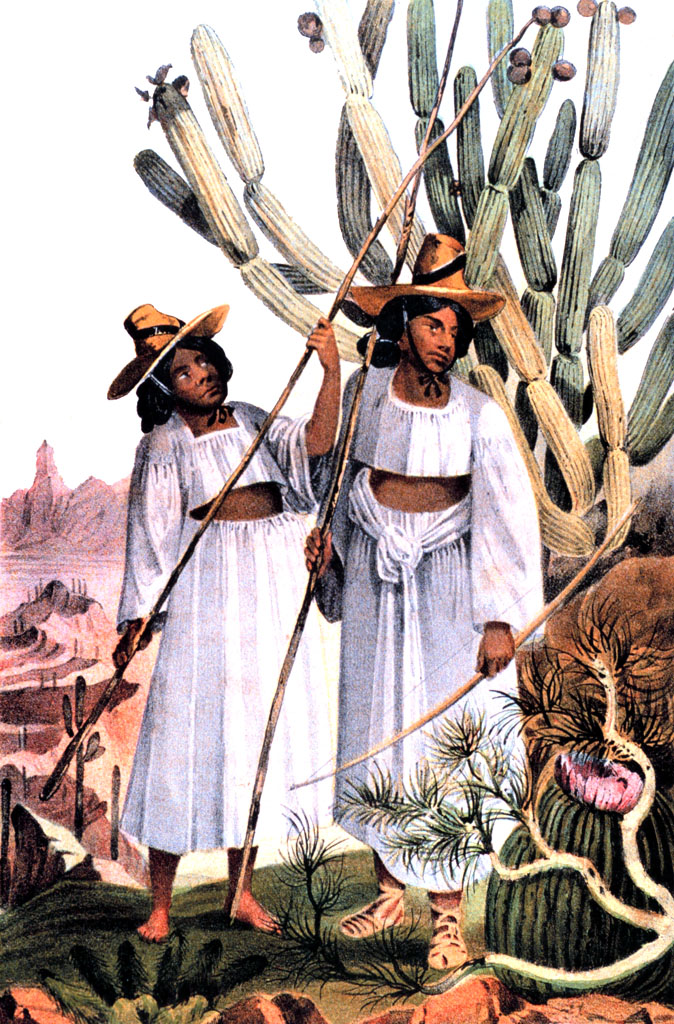
Native Americans of the Tohono Oʼodham (Papago) tribe harvesting fruit from an organ pipe cactus, from the Report

The United States and Mexican Boundary Survey was a land survey that took play from 1848 to 1855 to determine the Mexico–United States border as defined in the Treaty of Guadalupe Hidalgo, the treaty that ended the Mexican–American War. In 1850, the U.S. government commissioned John Russel Bartlett to lead the survey. The results of the survey were published in the three volumes entitled Report on the United States and Mexican boundary survey, made under the direction of the secretary of the Interior by William H. Emory (1857–1859).

In addition to its documentation of the new boundary, the survey report was notable for its natural history content, including paleontology, botany, ichthyology, herpetology, ornithology, and mammalogy. The survey was also provided to the United States Department of War in order to provide data for building a railroad line.

In the report's section titled, "Personal Accounts", a brief description of Panama is also included, along with the experiences the men had while conducting the survey, including the experiences of having insufficient funding which was essentially starving out the men as prices around them rose trying to exploit their presence. Further funds were eventually sent but only after a state of disarray over changes in management for the project. Even when the funds were sent they were embezzled by one of the new commissioners, prompting Emory to go to Washington himself to secure additional funds.

Even after this the funds still took time to reach the workers, who after Emory's return had started to mutiny and riot causing a complete halt in production. Emory, in order to resolve the situation was given authority directly from the Department of the Interior to requisition funds directly which he used to pay a portion of the workers.

The survey faced several issues, most notably from Native populations such as the Apache people, where instances of attacks from Native Americans on survey groups are also noted in the accounts with a request to the War Department for military escorts. The survey and the drawing of a new border cut through these populations' homelands, and thus they did not recognise the sovereignty of either the US or Mexican commissioners, who were constantly aware and threatened by their presence. Their resistance was primarily carried out through raids, with notable examples resulting in Mexican engineers losing both horses and mules, in some more severe examples, raids saw casualties on both the sides of Mexicans and Apache people. Comparatively, the commission maintained much better relations with the Pima people and Maricopa people who acted as guides and provided information to the commission, highlighting the contrasting nature that the commission had with native populations.

Twenty-five hand-colored lithographic plates of birds were included in the volume Zoology of the Boundary, edited by Spencer Fullerton Baird. These illustrations were prepared by J.T. Bowen and Company of Philadelphia, the same firm that had produced the octavo edition of Audubon's Birds of America. Numerous illustrations of plants, reptiles, and amphibians were included, colored in some editions. The hand-colored lithographs of scenery and ethnography are important historical records.

As a result of the boundary survey and subsequent treaties, the U.S. and Mexico established the International Boundary and Water Commission (IBWC) in 1889 to maintain the border, allocate river waters between the two nations, and provide for flood control and water sanitation. Once viewed as a model of international cooperation, in recent decades the IBWC has been heavily criticized as an institutional anachronism.

== See also ==
- Bibliography of the Mexican American War
- Timeline of the Mexican American War
- Outline of the Mexican American War
- Gadsden Purchase
- Pacific Railroad Surveys
