= Jacob Wallace =

American guerrilla leader (1810–1847)

Jacob Wallace (August 1, 1810 – April 20, 1847) was a pro-Mexican guerrilla leader in the Mexican–American War.

== Early life ==
Born in Kentucky in 1810, Wallace was homeschooled by his mother and moved to Missouri when he was 16, marrying Marcie Lewis when he was 18, and having two children, Sarah and Thomas.

In the 1840s, when the United States went to war with Mexico, Wallace struggled to pay his debts on the small farm his family ran. He did not send his children to school. Local government officials in his area met with him in June 1846 in which he was ordered to either join the US military or go to jail for failing to pay his taxes. He agreed to join the military. When it was discovered he was breaking the law by not sending his children to school, they were taken away from him. Wallace became insane after this experience and grew to hate the US. He was enlisted in the Missouri volunteers and sent to Mexico. Shortly after arriving he received word his wife had committed suicide over the loss of their children, which completely unhinged him.

== Defection to the Mexican side ==
In September, his regiment fought at the Battle of Monterrey. During the battle, Wallace killed several US soldiers and defected to the Mexican side. Wallace had been taught Spanish by his mother and he joined the forces of Mexican guerrilla leader Pancho Juana. Juana and Wallace were defeated by US soldiers at the battle of Los Zanetios. Juana died of alcohol poisoning shortly after and Wallace formed his own guerrilla force, known as Raiders matar estadounidenses (Spanish for American-killing raiders). Wallace's men attacked the pro-American Mexican town of Quito, killing over 200 Mexican civilians. In February 1847, Wallace attacked an American wagon train at Gonzales and killed 30 US soldiers. Afterwards his men killed 200 dragoons, scalping and mutilating the bodies, decorating body parts to their saddles. He then rode to the camp of General Antonio López de Santa Anna at the Battle of Buena Vista, and participated in battle there. Next his men fought at the Battle of the Sacramento River and killed 30 Texas rangers in an attack on their camp. He murdered over 150 American soldiers and civilians after attacking a supply column. In March, his guerrillas raided into New Mexico, supporting the Taos Revolt, and fighting Apaches. During the New Mexico raids, his men killed an American general. He wanted to raid into California and Texas but US forces drove him back into Mexico. He suffered a devastating defeat at the Battle of Columbia over which half his men and commanders were killed.

He fought at the Battle of Cerro Gordo on April 18, 1847, and two days later his band was attacked by American forces in which he was fatally shot in the head and all of his men killed or captured. His head was cut off and he was scalped, and his body tossed along the road. US forces displayed his head after capturing Mexico City.

Wallace was known for horrific brutality, raping women, cutting off the genitals of children, and scalping, skinning, dismembering, castrating, disemboweling, beheading, and other mutilations on US soldiers. He became known as the "White Apache Tiger" and "Bloody Jacob". He has some direct living descendants. The Mexican government never recognized him as a Mexican citizen or regular soldier.
