= Mexican Hussars =

The Hussars of the Guard of the Supreme Powers originated as an Active Militia light cavalry squadron raised from Dec. 3rd, 1841. The main function was as a Presidential Escort for Santa Anna. Hussars protected the “supreme powers” held by the president.
