= USS Admittance =

History

United States
- Name: USS Admittance
- Acquired: by seizure, 8 April 1847
- Out of service: 6 May 1848
- Fate: Unknown

General characteristics
- Type: Brig

USS Admittance was a brig in the United States Navy.

Little is known about Admittance. She was an American merchant brig operating along the California coast during the Mexican–American War. The United States sloop of war Portsmouth seized this vessel on 8 April 1847 at San Jose, California, for "trading with the enemy."

Commander John B. Montgomery, commanding officer of Portsmouth, took the prize into the Navy. Under the command of Lt. Joseph Warren Revere, she served until 6 May 1848. No record of her fate thereafter seems to have survived.
