= USS Union (1846) =

History

United States
- Name: USS Union
- Acquired: 14 November 1846
- Fate: Wrecked 16 December 1846

General characteristics
- Type: Schooner
- Propulsion: Sails

The second USS Union was a schooner that served in the United States Navy briefly during the Mexican War.

Union was serving as a Mexican schooner when the U.S. Navy steam screw corvette USS Princeton captured her off Tampico, Mexico, on 14 November 1846. She entered U.S. Navy service later that month with Lieutenant John Ancrum Winslow in command.

Poorly equipped, Union was wrecked on a reef off Veracruz, Mexico, on 16 December 1846.

== See also ==
- John Ancrum Winslow
- Mexican–American War
