= List of weapons of the Mexican–American War =

This is a List of weapons of the Mexican–American War.

== United States of America ==
=== Edged Weapons ===
- Model 1840 Cavalry Saber
- Model 1833 Dragoon Saber
- Model 1840 NCO Sword

=== Muskets ===
- Springfield Model 1842 Musket
- Springfield Model 1816 Musket
- Springfield Model 1795 Musket (limited)

=== Rifles ===
- Mississippi Rifle (Model 1841)
- M1819 Hall rifle
- Deringer M1817 rifle

=== Sidearms ===
- Colt Paterson Revolver
- Colt 1847 Walker Revolver
- Model 1836 Flintlock Pistol
- U.S. H. Aston Model 1842 Pistol

=== Artillery ===
- M1841 6-pounder field gun
- M1841 12-pounder howitzer
- M1841 24-pounder howitzer

== Second Federal Republic of Mexico ==
During the Mexican–American War, the Mexicans mostly used Spanish weapons leftover from the Mexican War of Independence and British arms that were brought in the mid 1820s.

=== Edged Weapons ===
- British Model 1821 Light Cavalry Sabre

Various French and Spanish Sabers and Lances

=== Muskets ===
- Land Pattern Musket (Brown Bess)
- French Pattern 1835 Musket
- French Model 1777
- Spanish Model 1803 Musket

=== Rifles ===
- Pattern 1800 Infantry Rifle (Baker Rifle) (limited)

=== Sidearms ===
- 1817 Ramon Zuloaga Miquelet-lock Fusil

Various other French and Spanish Sidearms

=== Artillery ===
Various French and Spanish Artillery
