= Mexico City National Cemetery =

American war cemetery

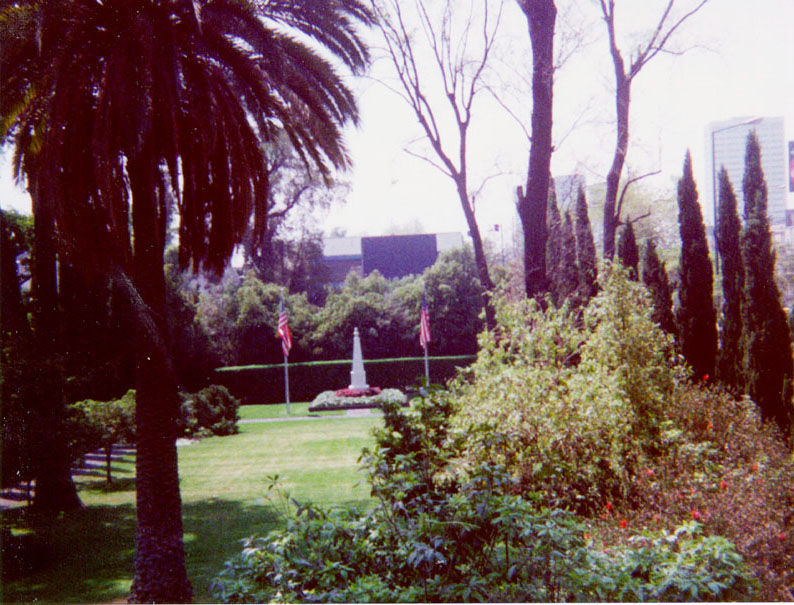
- View toward the monument at the Mexico City National Cemetery
- Interactive map of Mexico City National Cemetery

Details
- Established: 1851
- Location: Colonia San Rafael, Mexico City
- Country: Mexico
- Coordinates: 19°26′34″N 99°9′56″W
- Owned by: American Battle Monuments Commission
- No. of graves: ~1,000
- Website: https://www.abmc.gov/Mexico-City
- Find a Grave: Mexico City National Cemetery

The Mexico City National Cemetery is a cemetery in Mexico City. It was established in 1851 by the United States Congress to gather the American dead of the Mexican–American War who lay in the nearby fields and to provide burial space for Americans who died in the vicinity.

It is first dedicated United States military cemetery abroad and served as a model for later cemeteries.

== History ==
An Act of Congress on 28 September 1850 authorized the purchase of land for a cemetery. Two acres were purchased for US$3,000 and US$1,734 worth of improvements were done in July 1852. The 750 individuals were interred in 1853.

A small monument marks the common grave of 750 American dead of the War of 1847. Inscribed on the monument are the words:

TO THE HONORED MEMORY
OF 750 AMERICANS
KNOWN BUT TO GOD
WHOSE BONES COLLECTED
BY THEIR COUNTRY'S ORDER
ARE HERE BURIED

This inscription is incorrect: all the names are known.

The March 29, 1866 edition of The Nation reported that cemetery keeper Schneider was given permission to grow produce on the grounds to supplement the commissions he earned from burials. He grew cabbages, so the cemetery was consequently given the epithet "American cabbage-ground" by Mexico City residents. In May 1872, the US Congress approved an annual salary of US$1,105 for the cemetery keeper.

In January 1873, the cemetery came under the protection and funding of the administration responsible for military cemeteries in the United States.

In the 1-acre (4,000 m^{2}) area are also placed 813 remains of Americans and others in wall crypts on either side of the cemetery. The cemetery was closed to further burials in 1923.

The cemetery, which is administered by the American Battle Monuments Commission, is open daily to the public from 9 a.m. to 5 p.m. except December 25 and January 1. It is open on Mexican holidays. When the cemetery is open to the public, a staff member is on duty in the Visitor Building to answer questions and to escort relatives to grave and memorial sites.

== Location ==
The cemetery is at 31 Virginia Fabregas, Colonia San Rafael, about 2 miles (3.2 km) west of the Mexico City Metropolitan Cathedral and 1 mile (1.6 km) north of the U.S. embassy.

== Notable burials ==
- Henry Watkins Allen (1820–1866), Confederate States brigadier general and governor of Louisiana, later disinterred and buried in Louisiana
- James E. Slaughter (1827–1901), Confederate States brigadier general
