= Mormon Battalion Monument (Sandoval County, New Mexico) =

Monument in Sandoval County, New Mexico, United States

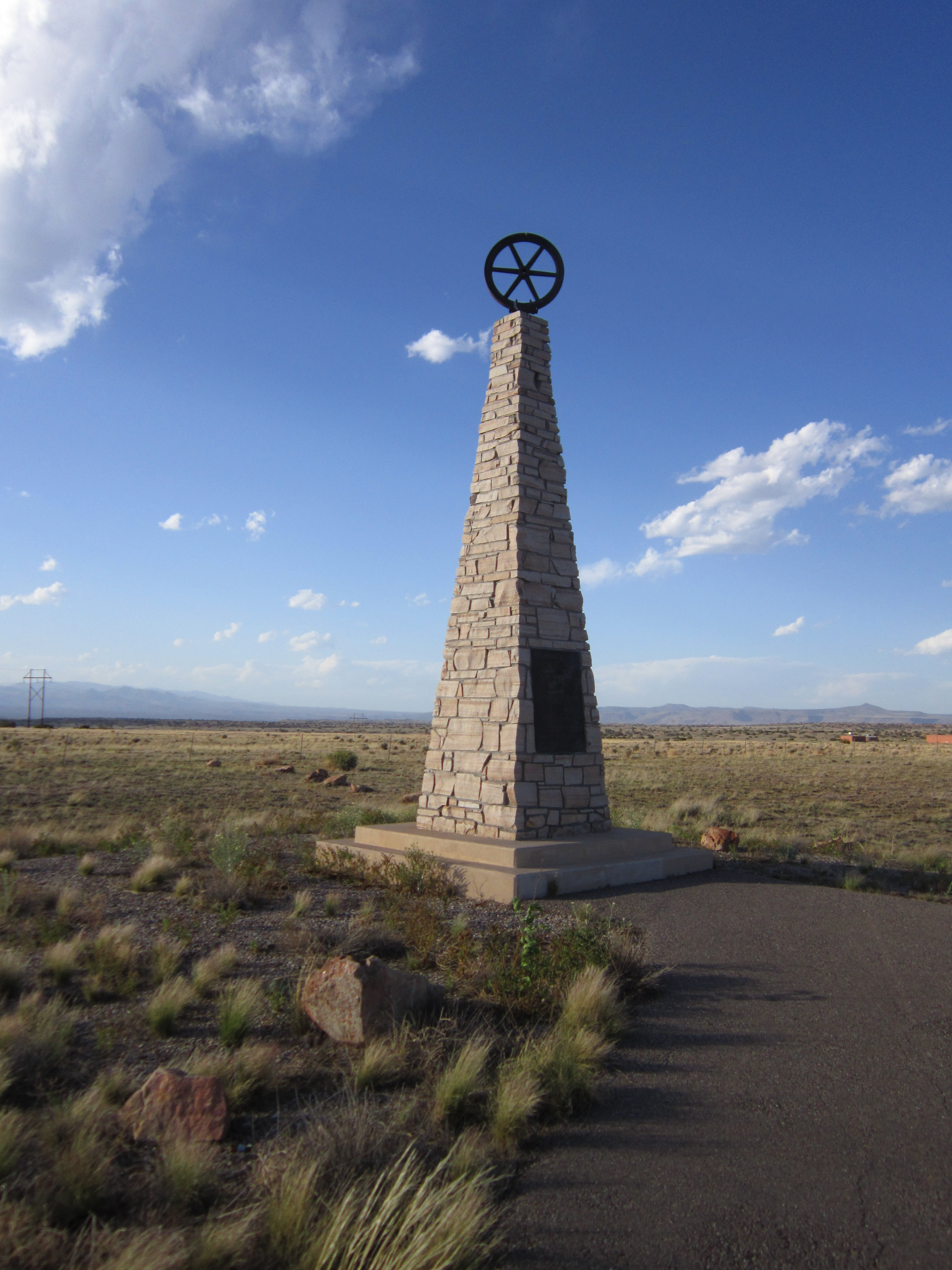
- The monument in 2014
- Interactive map of Mormon Battalion Monument
- Location: Sandoval County, New Mexico
- Coordinates: 35.451646°N 106.353897°W
- Height: 20 feet (6.1 m)
- Opening date: 1940; 1996
- Dedicated to: Mormon Battalion, Mexican–American War

The Mormon Battalion Monument is a historic obelisk in rural Sandoval County, New Mexico. It was built in honor of members of the Church of Jesus Christ of Latter-day Saints (LDS Church) who served in the United States Army's Mormon Battalion during the Mexican–American War of 1846–1848. It was built in 1940, removed in 1982, and rebuilt in 1996.

== Location ==
The original monument was located "32 miles north of Albuquerque on Highway 85." The 1996 monument is located "five miles northeast of San Felipe Pueblo, New Mexico [...] near the dead end of a road reached via exit 257 on Interstate 25." It is located off a frontage road along the north side of Interstate 25.

== History ==
The original monument was erected by members of the LDS Church from Albuquerque and Los Alamos, New Mexico. Its dedication, held in June 1940, was attended by thousands, including the Church of Jesus Christ leader George Albert Smith and U.S. Army Adjutant General R. C. Charlton. (The original monument was designed and built by Joaquin Antonio Bazan after a group of members of the Church of Jesus Christ came to him and commissioned him to do so. A little known secret is that the "wagon wheel" that tops the spire comes from an old oil derrick. Joaquin Bazan, a building contractor, master craftsman and third generation New Mexico politician, used this wheel because he knew that a real wagon wheel would not stand up to the elements.)

The monument was removed in 1982, during the construction of Interstate 25. At the time, it was supposed to be split into two monuments to be installed on either side of the highway.

The forgotten monument was mentioned by columnist George Calloway in the Albuquerque Journal in 1996. Shortly after, a community activist contacted two Republicans about it: Gerald Weeks, who served in the New Mexico House of Representatives, and Joseph Carraro, who served in the New Mexico Senate. For a cost of $30,000, the monument was rebuilt with sandstones from Los Lunas the same year. The 20-foot obelisk has a wheel at the top and a bronze plaque on one side at the bottom. Its rededication, held on September 7, 1996, was attended by 700 individuals, including Elder Garn.

== Plaque Inscription ==
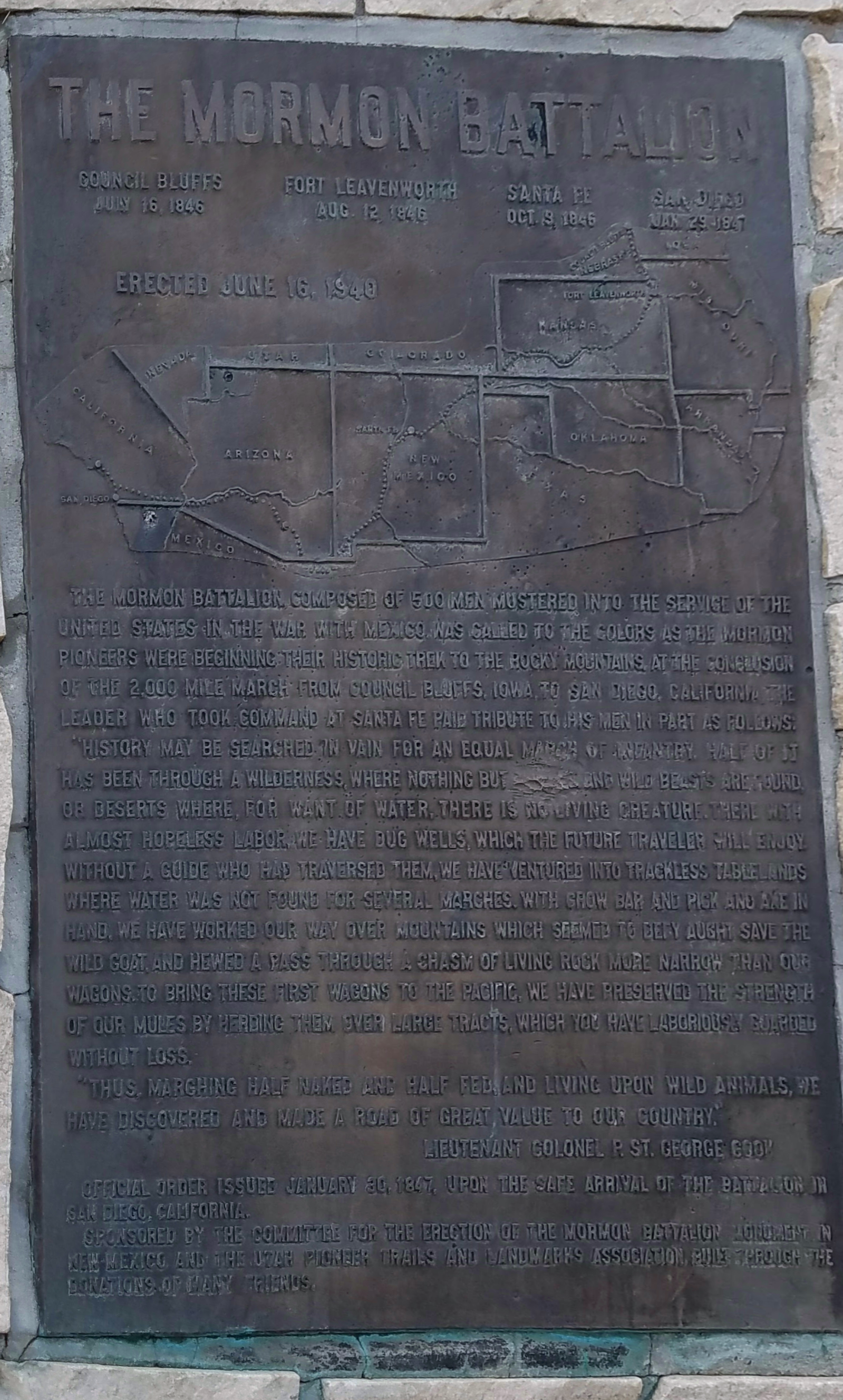
Photo of the plaque on the monument.

The Mormon Battalion

Council Bluffs	Fort Leavenworth	Santa Fe	San Diego
July 16, 1846	Aug. 12, 1846	Oct. 9, 1846	Jan. 29,1847

Erected June 16, 1940

The Mormon battalion, composed of 500 men mustered into the service of the United States in the war with Mexico, was called to the colors as the Mormon pioneers were beginning their historic trek to the Rocky Mountains. At the conclusion of the 2,000 mile march from Council Bluffs, Iowa, to San Diego, California, the leader who took command at Santa Fe paid tribute to his men in part as follows:

"History may be searched in vain for an equal march of infantry. Half of it has been through a wilderness, where nothing but ~~savages*~~ and wild beasts are found, or deserts where, for want of water, there is no living creature. There with almost hopeless labor, we have dug wells, which the future traveler will enjoy. Without a guide who had traversed them, we have ventured into trackless tablelands where water was not found for several marches. With crow bar and pick and axe in hand, we have worked our way over mountains which seemed to defy aught save the wild goat, and hewed a pass through a chasm of living rock more narrow than our wagons. To bring these first wagons to the pacific, we have preserved the strength of our mules by herding them over large tracts, which you have laboriously guarded without loss.

"Thus, marching half naked and half fed, and living upon wild animals, we have discovered and made a road of great value to our country."

Lieutenant Colonel P. St. George Cook

Official order issued January 30, 1847, upon the safe arrival of the battalion in San Diego, California.

Sponsored by the Committee for the Erection of the Mormon Battalion Monument in New Mexico and the Utah Pioneer Trails and Landmarks Association, built through the donation of many friends.

* The word "savages" has since been scratched off.
