= Third Battle of Tuxpan =

1847 minor battle of the Mexican-American War

- Part of Mexican–American War
Date	June 30, 1847
Location	Tuxpan, Veracruz
Result	United States victory

Belligerents
United States	Mexico

Commanders and leaders
Matthew C. Perry	Unknown

Strength
Land: unknown marines, sailors, unknown artillery Sea: unknown naval forces	unknown infantry, militia

Casualties and losses
2 killed, 5 wounded	unknown

The Third Battle of Tuxpan was one of the three small engagements of the Mexican–American War to occur at Tuxpan, Mexico. The battle occurred on June 30, 1847, between Mexican troops (or militia) and an American landing force from the Mosquito Fleet under Matthew C. Perry.

Little is known, but a skirmish was fought, ending in the deaths of one American, and another who died two or three days later. Five others were wounded. At least four of the wounded Americans were made casualties by a gunpowder barrel explosion, caused by an unknown source. Mexican casualties are unknown.

The United States blockade of Tuxpan continued.

== See also ==
- First Battle of Tuxpan
