= Timeline of the Mexican American War =

Mexican–American War
- Part of the Manifest destiny
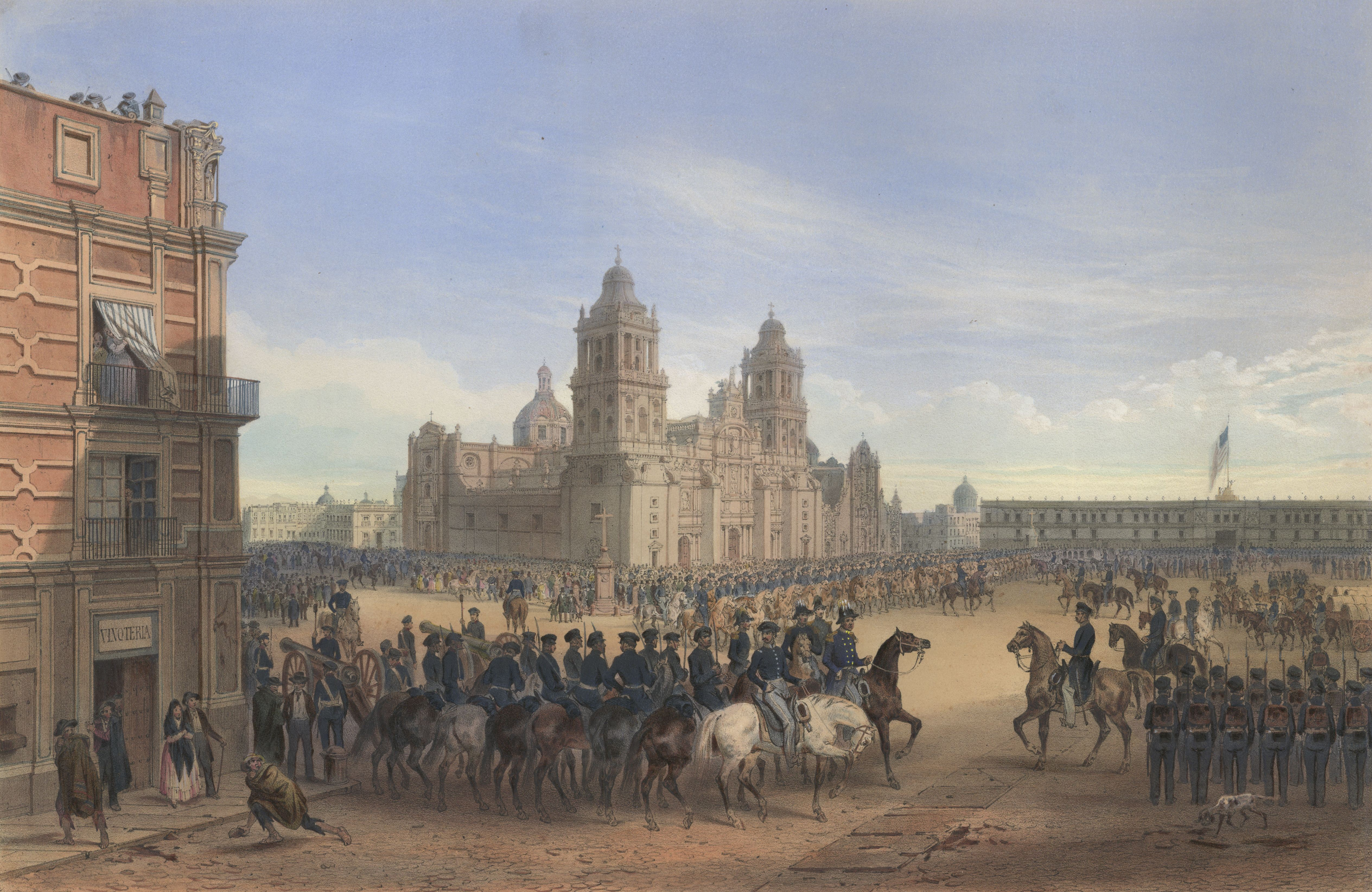
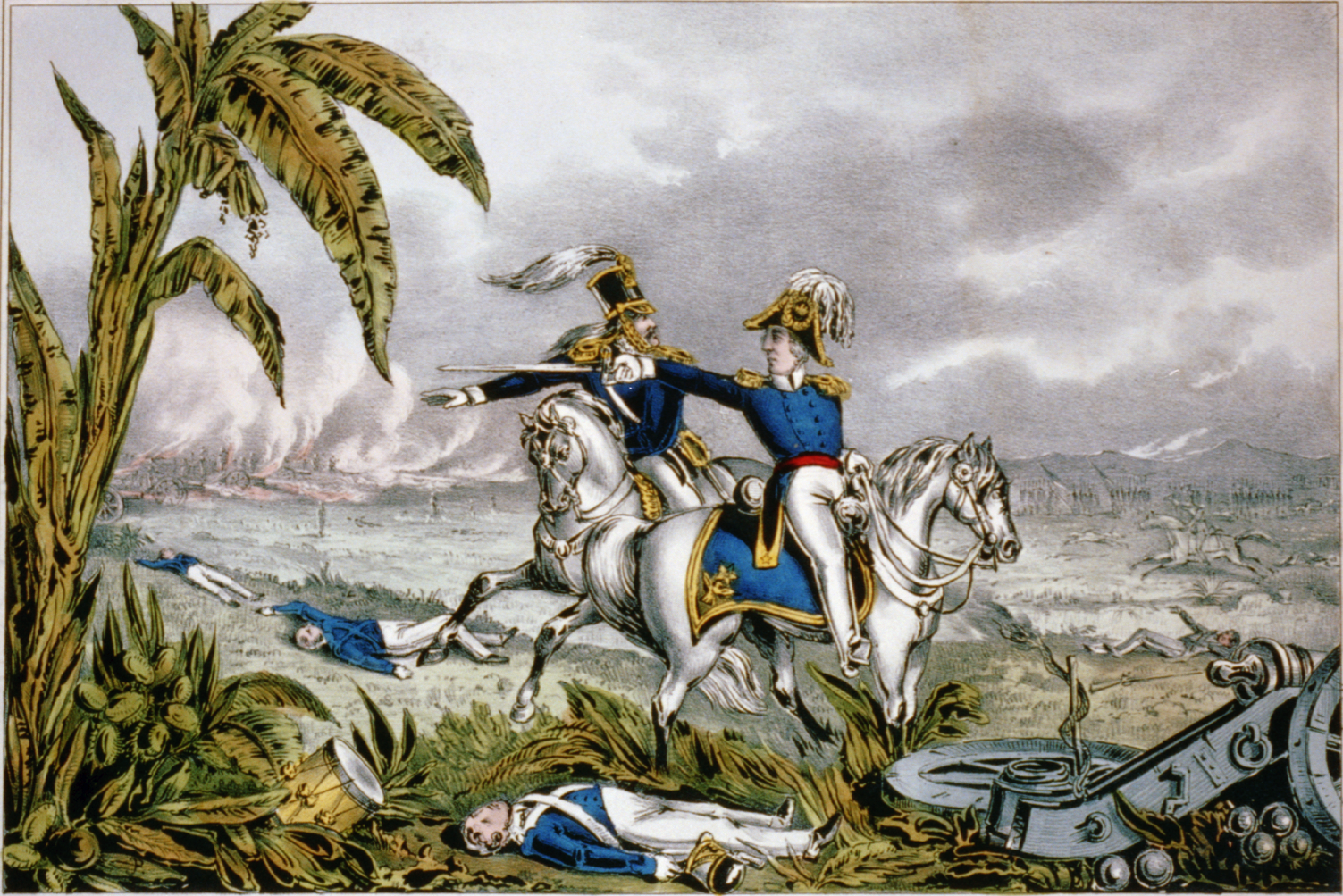
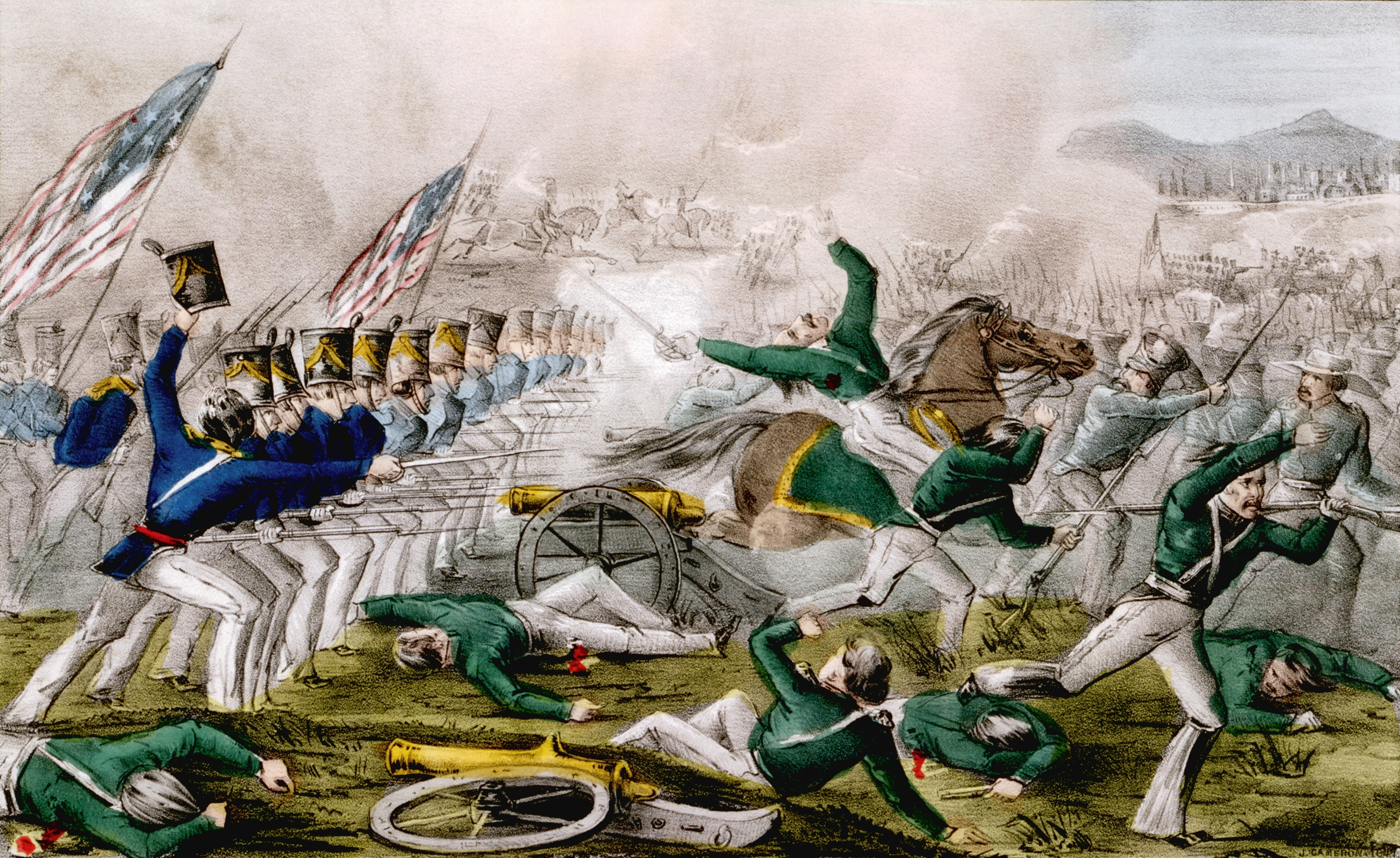
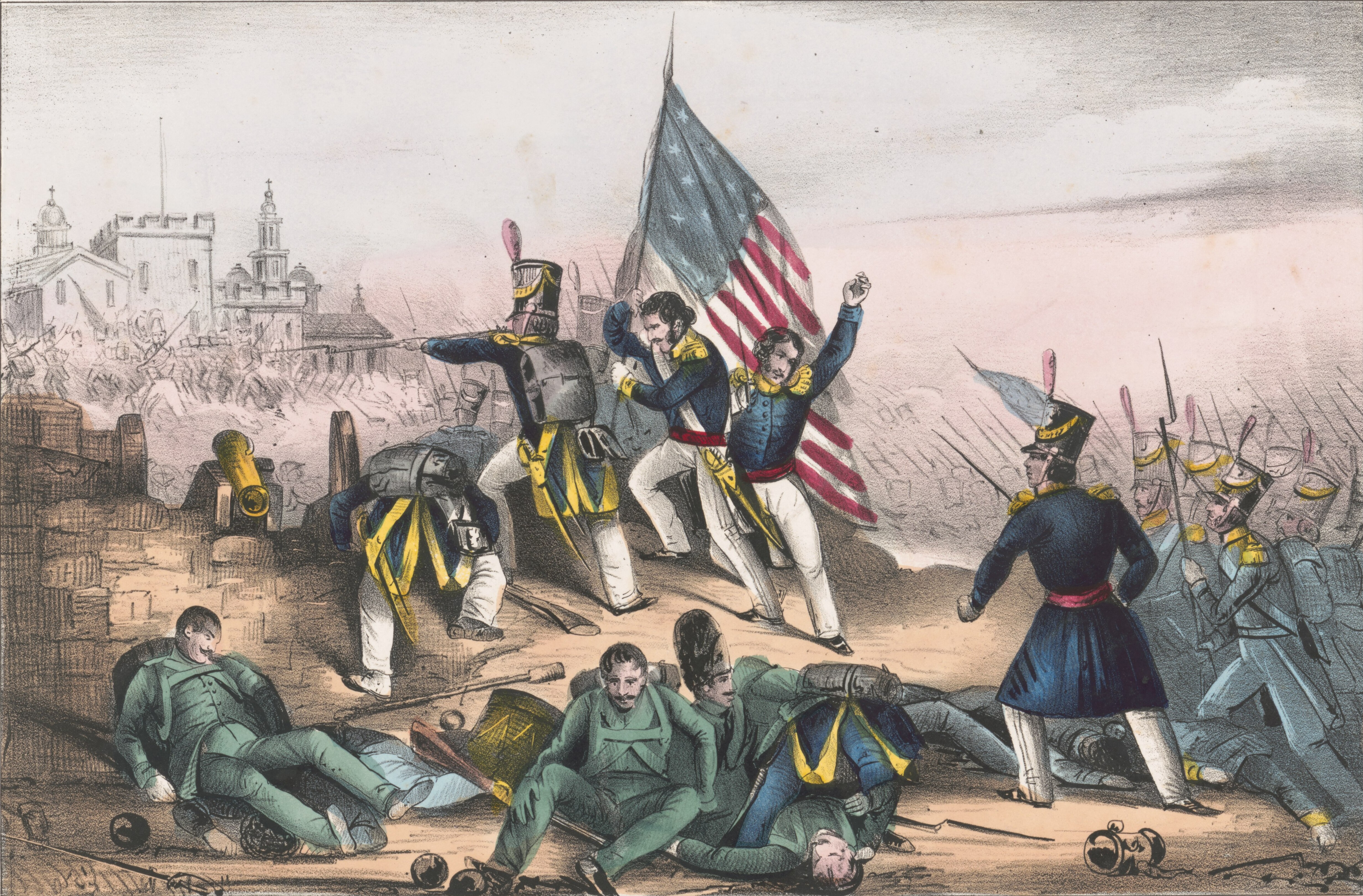
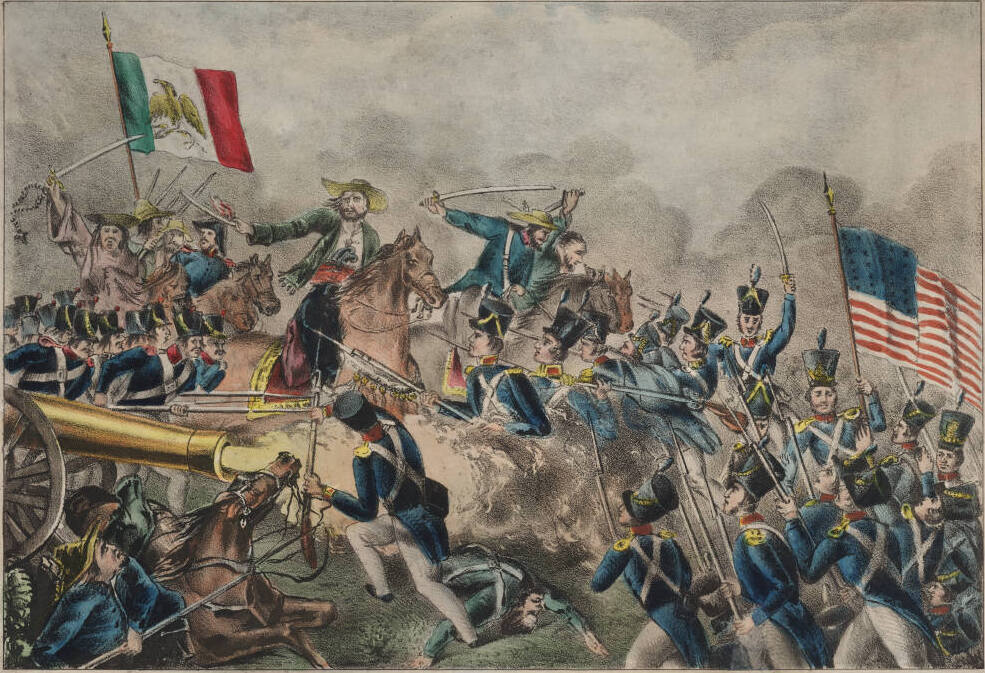
- Clockwise from top: Winfield Scott entering Plaza de la Constitución after the Fall of Mexico City, U.S. soldiers engaging the retreating Mexican force during the Battle of Resaca de la Palma, U.S. victory at Churubusco outside of Mexico City, Marines storming Chapultepec castle under a large U.S. flag, Battle of Cerro Gordo
Date	April 25, 1846 – February 2, 1848 (1 year, 9 months, 1 week and 1 day)
Location	Texas, New Mexico, California; Northern, Central, and Eastern Mexico; Mexico City
Result	American victory
Territorial changes	Mexican Cession: Mexico cedes to the U.S. present-day California, Texas, New Mexico, Utah, Nevada, and Arizona, and parts of Colorado, Oklahoma, Kansas, and Wyoming, for $15 million

This is a timeline of the Mexican American War, with the background events that led to it and the developments that followed it. (Note: Including the Bear Flag Revolt and the Conquest of California.)

The Mexican–American War (April 25, 1846 – February 2, 1848), known in Mexico as the United States intervention in Mexico, was an invasion of Mexico by the United States. It followed the 1845 American annexation of Texas, which Mexico still claimed as its territory, and a dispute over the border: Texas and the U.S. asserted the Rio Grande, Mexico the more northerly Nueces River. President James K. Polk, elected in 1844 on a platform of territorial expansion, offered $25 million for the disputed land and California; Mexico refused. He then sent troops into the disputed territory, where Mexican forces repelled them on April 25, 1846, giving Polk grounds to obtain a declaration of war from Congress.

U.S. forces occupied Santa Fe de Nuevo México and Alta California, the Pacific Squadron blockaded Mexico's Pacific coast, and Major General Winfield Scott landed at Veracruz and captured Mexico City in September 1847. The 1848 Treaty of Guadalupe Hidalgo, negotiated by Nicholas Trist after Polk had recalled him, ended the war: Mexico ceded the territory of present-day California, Nevada, and Utah and parts of Arizona, Colorado, New Mexico, and Wyoming, gave up its claims on Texas, and accepted the Rio Grande as its northern border with the United States, while the U.S. paid $15 million and assumed $3.25 million of Mexican debt to U.S. citizens. The acquisitions intensified the American debate over slavery and are seen by some scholars as a step toward the American Civil War, in which many officers who had gained experience in Mexico later held prominent commands. Mexico was left with heavy casualties, ruined finances, political turmoil, lost prestige, and the loss of more than half its territory.

== Background ==
- Manifest destiny
- Nueces Strip
- 1830s–1840s – Comanche–Mexico Wars
- 1818–1846 – Oregon boundary dispute
- 1835–1846 – Centralist Republic of Mexico
- 1835–1836 – Siete Leyes
- 1835–1836 – Texas Revolution
- 1836 – Battle of the Alamo
- 21 April 1836 – Battle of San Jacinto
- 14 May 1836 – Treaties of Velasco – agreements ending the Texas Revolution.
- 1836–1846 – Republic of Texas
- 1838–1839 – Pastry War
- 1840 – Republic of the Rio Grande
- 1841 – Texan Santa Fe Expedition
- 1842 – Capture of Monterey
- 1842–1843 – Mier expedition
- 1843 – Texas raids on New Mexico (1843)
- 1844 – 1844 United States presidential election
- 1845 – Battle of Providencia
- 29 December 1845 – Texas annexation
- 1845–1846 – John Slidell

== Events of the war ==
=== 1846 ===
- 5 April – Sacramento River massacre
- 25 April – 9 May – Texas Campaign
- 25 April – Thornton Affair
- 3–9 May – Siege of Fort Texas
- 8 May – Battle of Palo Alto
- 9 May – Battle of Resaca de la Palma
- 12 May – Klamath Lake massacre
- 13 May – United States declaration of war on Mexico
- June – Sutter Buttes Massacre
- 14 June – 9 July – Bear Flag Revolt
- 1846 – California Republic
- 15 June 1846 – 13 January 1847 – Conquest of California
- 24 June – Battle of Olómpali
- 7 July – Battle of Monterey
- 9 July – Capture of Yerba Buena
- 15 August – Capture of Santa Fe
- 21–24 September – Battle of Monterrey
- 22–30 September – Siege of Los Angeles
- 26–27 September – Battle of Chino
- 8–9 October – Battle of Dominguez Rancho
- 24–26 October – First Battle of Tabasco
- 16 November – Battle of Natividad
- 6–7 December – Battle of San Pasqual
- 16 December – Capture of Tucson (1846)
- 25 December – Battle of El Brazito
- December – Pauma massacre
- December – Temecula massacre
- 1846–1848 – Blockade of Veracruz
- 1846–1850 – Interim government of California

=== 1847 ===
- 2 January – Battle of Santa Clara (1847)
- 8 January – Battle of Río San Gabriel
- 9 January – Battle of La Mesa
- 13 January – Treaty of Cahuenga – ended fighting in California.
- 19 January – 9 July – Taos Revolt – Hispano and Puebloan uprising against American rule.
- 24 January – Battle of Cañada
- 24 January – First Battle of Mora
- 29 January – Battle of Embudo Pass
- 1 February – Second Battle of Mora
- 3–5 February – Siege of Pueblo de Taos
- 22–23 February – Battle of Buena Vista
- 26 February – 23 March – Revolt of the Polkos – coup d'état in Mexico.
- 28 February – Battle of Sacramento (Mexico)
- 9–29 March – Siege of Veracruz
- 18 April – Battle of Cerro Gordo
- 18 April – First Battle of Tuxpan
- 26 May – Red River Canyon affair
- June – Second Battle of Tuxpan
- 15–16 June – Second Battle of Tabasco
- 30 June – Third Battle of Tuxpan
- July – Cienega affair
- 19–20 August – Battle of Contreras
- 20 August – Battle of Churubusco
- 8–15 September – Battle for Mexico City
- 8 September – Battle of Molino del Rey
- 12–13 September – Battle of Chapultepec
- 14 September – 12 October – Siege of Puebla (1847)
- 2 October – Battle of Mulegé
- 9 October – Battle of Huamantla
- 19 October – Action of Atlixco
- 20 October – Bombardment of Guaymas
- 31 October – Bombardment of Punta Sombrero
- 16–17 November – Battle of La Paz
- 20–21 November – Battle of San José del Cabo
- 23 November – Skirmish at Matamoros
- 24 November – Affair at Galaxara Pass
- 27 November – 8 December – Siege of La Paz
- 22 December – Spot Resolutions – Abraham Lincoln's challenge to the war's justification.

=== 1848 ===
- 22 January – 14 February – Siege of San José del Cabo
- 2 February – Treaty of Guadalupe Hidalgo – peace treaty ending the war.
- 25 February – Action of Sequalteplan
- 16 March – Battle of Santa Cruz de Rosales
- 30 March – Skirmish of Todos Santos
- 1848 – Mexican Cession – territory ceded to the United States.

== Aftermath ==
- 1847 – Aztec Club of 1847 – military society of American officers who served in Mexico.
- 1848 – Free Soil Party
- 1848–1855 – California gold rush
- 1848–1855 – United States and Mexican Boundary Survey – survey fixing the new border.
- 1850 – Compromise of 1850
- 1850 – California Statehood Act
- 1851 – California Land Act of 1851
- 1853–1854 – Gadsden Purchase
- 1854 – Kansas–Nebraska Act
- 1854 – Plan of Ayutla
- 1854–1859 – Bleeding Kansas
- 1857–1861 – Reform War
- 1859–1861 – Cortina Troubles
- 1861–1867 – Second French intervention in Mexico
- 1861–1865 – American Civil War

== See also ==
- Bibliography of the Mexican American War
- Outline of the Mexican American War
- Mexico–United States border
- Mexico–United States relations
- Republic of Texas–United States relations
- Nueces Strip
- Texan raids on New Mexico (1843)
- Compromise of 1850
- Reconquista (Mexico)
- List of United States invasions of Latin American countries
