= Pacific Coast campaign (Mexican–American War) =

Campaign in the Mexican–American War

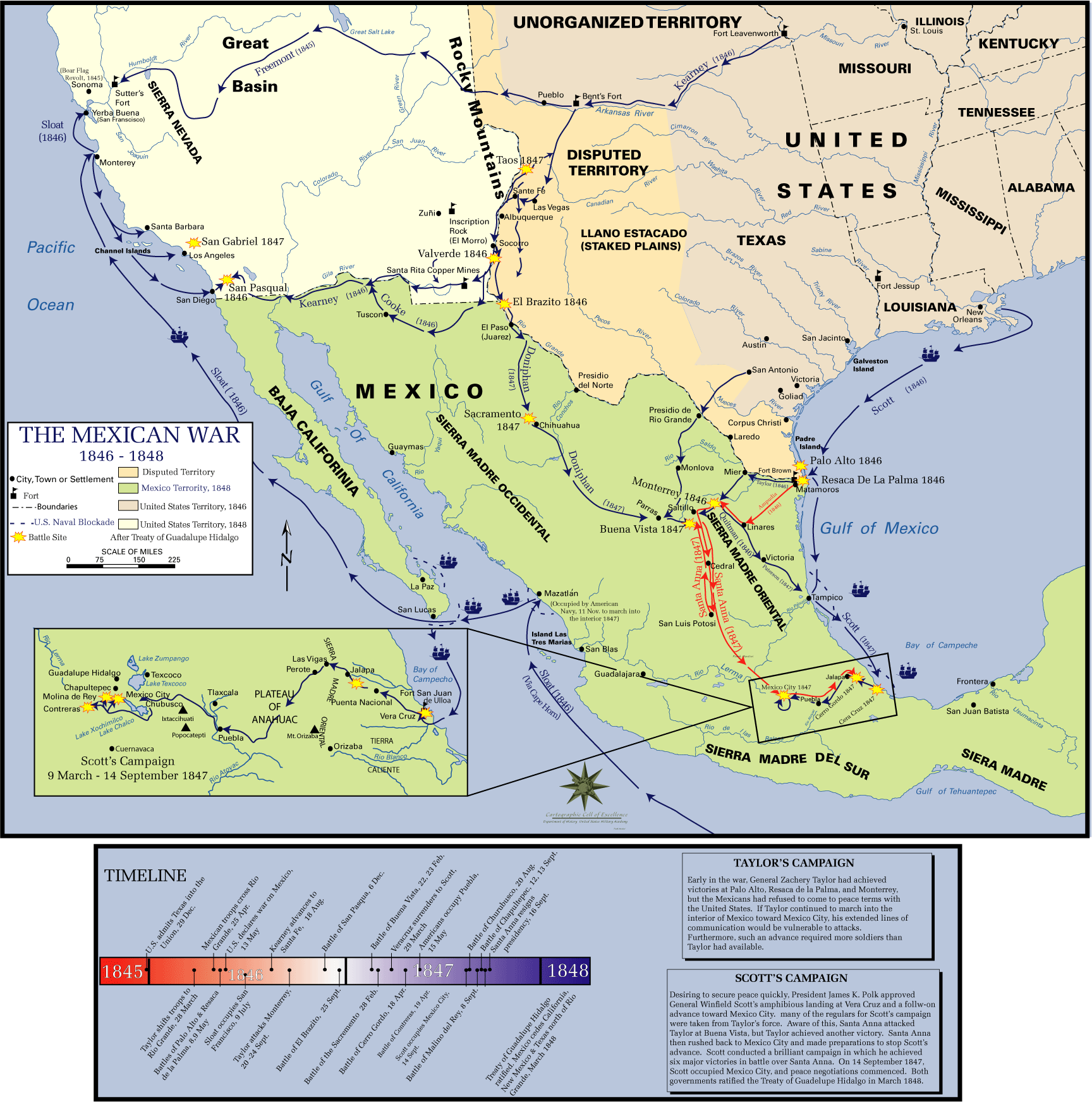
Overview of the war including engagements of the Pacific Coast Campaign

The Pacific Coast Campaign refers to United States naval operations against targets along Mexico's Pacific Coast during the Mexican–American War. It excludes engagements of the California Campaign in areas of The Californias north of the Baja California Peninsula. The objective of the campaign was to secure the Baja Peninsula of Mexico, and to blockade/capture west-coast ports of Mexico—especially Mazatlan, a major port-of-entry for imported supplies. The resistance of Mexican forces to the north in the Los Angeles area and the lack of ships, soldiers and logistical support prevented an early occupation of the peninsula and the west-coast Mexican seaports. The U.S. Navy attempted blockades of the ports three times before being able to successfully blockade and/or occupy them.

Following an easy initial occupation and the capitulation of La Paz by Governor Col. Francisco Palacios Miranda, loyalist residents met, declared Miranda a traitor, and rose in revolt. Under a new governor, Mauricio Castro Cota, and then under the leadership of Manuel Pineda Munoz (who defended Mulege from American landings), the loyalists attempted to expel the Americans from La Paz and San José del Cabo. Pineda was eventually captured and the Mexican army under Cota was finally defeated at Todos Santos but only after the Treaty of Guadalupe Hidalgo that ended the war returned captured regions south of San Diego to Mexico.

== First Blockade of the West Coast of Mexico ==
Following the July–August 1846 campaign led by the Commander of the U.S. Navy Pacific Squadron, Commodore Robert F. Stockton proclaimed United States control of northern regions of Las Californias (known separately before 1836 as Alta California), on August 17, 1846. On August 19, Commander Stockton ordered Joseph B. Hull, commander of the USS Warren, to blockade Mazatlan. Samuel F. Dupont, commander of the second class sloop-of-war Cyane, was ordered to blockade San Blas (about 125 miles south of Mazatlan). Stockton intended to seize Acapulco, and use it as a base for a joint Army-Navy expedition into Mexico. On September 2, 1846, the Cyane captured two Mexican vessels in the harbor then a landing party spiked 34 cannons in the port of San Blas. On September 7, the Warren seized the Mexican brig Malek Adhel at Mazatlan.

In an August 17 proclamation, Stockton had claimed United States control of the Baja Peninsula. To make good on this claim, Commander Dupont then sailed north to La Paz (on the Gulf of California), seized nine small pearl-fishing boats and secured a promise of neutrality from Colonel Francisco Palacios Miranda, governor of Baja California. On October 1, the Cyane seized two schooners at Loreto (about 150 miles north of La Paz). On October 7, the Cyane shelled Guaymas on the mainland after Colonel Antonio Campazano refused to surrender it. A boarding party from the Cyane seized the brig Condor in that port but, finding it unusable, burned it.

The revolt of Californians in Los Angeles (September 27, 1846) prevented the resupply and replacement of the blockade force who could not maintain station without them. When news of the revolt came the Warren left for San Francisco. On November 13, the Cyane followed ending the first blockade of Mexico's west coast after about four weeks.

== Second Blockade of the West Coast of Mexico, Occupation of Baja California Sur ==
On December 24, 1846, Secretary of the Navy John Y. Mason ordered Stockton to impose an effective blockade on the west coast of Mexico. Its object was to prevent the enemy from getting munitions and other supplies and to make possible the landing of American soldiers.

The Battle of La Mesa, which took place on January 9, 1847, was the last armed resistance to the United States conquest of California. The conquest and annexation of was confirmed with the signing of the Treaty of Cahuenga by US Army Lieutenant-Colonel John C. Frémont and Mexican General Andrés Pico on January 13, 1847. With the fate of California settled, on January 11, 1847, Secretary of War William L. Marcy instructed General Stephen Watts Kearny, commanding the Army forces in California, to make the American hold on the Californias so secure that none could successfully challenge it. However, at the time Kearny had only one company of troops (about 100 men), and awaited reinforcements.

On February 3, Commodore Stockton, in San Diego ordered Commander John B. Montgomery, on the Portsmouth, to reestablish the blockade at Mazatlan and to raise the United States flag at San Jose del Cabo, La Paz, Pichilinque, and Loreto. However, resistance to the Americans was arising in the region. On February 15, a council meeting at Santa Anita (about 20 miles north of San Jose del Cabo) declared Governor Miranda a traitor and named Mauricio Castro Cota, of San Jose del Cabo, as his successor. Cota then attempted to raise a company of volunteers, but without success.

On February 17, Montgomery imposed a blockade on Mazatlan, despite British objections. Montgomery then sailed for the Baja California peninsula, seizing San Jose del Cabo and San Lucas, but without sufficient forces did not set up garrisons there. On April 14, Montgomery accepted Colonel Miranda's surrender of La Paz. The articles of capitulation granted, to residents of Baja California who accepted the terms, the rights of United States citizens, along with retention of their own officials and laws.

Fortunately for Kearny, the means to occupy Baja California Sur arrived at San Francisco, in March and April, in the form of the 1st Regiment of New York Volunteers. Acting under blockade instructions issued by the new commander of the Pacific Squadron, Commodore James Biddle, Commodore William Shubrick in the Independence, with the Cyane on April 26, relieved Montgomery and the Portsmouth, and resumed the blockade of Mazatlan April 27, 1847.

On May 30, General Kearny sent U.S. Army Lieutenant Colonel Henry S. Burton, with Companies A and B of the New York Volunteers to La Paz on the storeship Lexington. Burton was to take possession of that part of the peninsula and uphold United States' laws. On July 15, 115 New York Volunteers landed at La Paz. Burton reinstated the civil government on condition it remained loyal to the United States. Residents of La Paz, in turn, entertained the Volunteers.

On June 3, after the Independence left for San Francisco, the Cyane was the only U. S. Navy warship on the west coast of Mexico. To provide the friendly inhabitants of La Paz and San Jose del Cabo with a semblance of protection, Commander Dupont sailed the Cyane back and forth between San Jose del Cabo and Mazatlan, which broke the blockade. Upon meeting the Cyane at San Jose del Cabo, on June 20, Montgomery, of the Portsmouth, became aware that Mazatlan was open to commerce. After conferring with Dupont, Montgomery returned June 28 to San Francisco to ask Biddle for instructions while the Cyane sailed to Hawaii for supplies. The second blockade had failed.

== Third Blockade of West Coast of Mexico, Revolt of Baja California Sur ==
Meanwhile, to the north of La Paz, at Loreto and Mulege, local priest Gabriel Gonzalez Pereyra of Todos Santos and Padre Vicente Sotomayor of Comondú incited rancheros to join the resistance to the Americans. In late September, Captain Manuel Pineda, of the Mexican army, arrived in Mulegé with officers and soldiers from Guaymas and began recruiting rancheros for his command.

On August 10, 1847, U.S. Navy Commodore Shubrick had succeeded Commodore Biddle in command of the Pacific Squadron. His first orders were to send the frigate Congress with of sloops-of-war USS Dale and USS Portsmouth to commence a new blockade of Mazatlán, Guaymas and San Blas.

On October 2, Mexican and local resistance forces led by Captain Pineda prevented a detachment of American forces from USS Dale from capturing the small port of Mulegé. This alerted the Americans to the serious revolt that was brewing.

On October 19 the threat of bombardment of the fort and city of Guaymas by Captain Elie A. F. La Vallette with his USS Congress and the sloop USS Portsmouth led to a secret evacuation of the Mexican garrison and fortress artillery on the night the 19th of November by Col. Antonio Campuzano. Following the morning bombardment of the fort and city, La Vallette landed to take possession, to find the city abandoned by its defenders and most its population. On November 11, 1847, a large Pacific Squadron landing party captured Mazatlan without firing a shot. On November 19–20, 1847 a land force cooperating with a landing force fought the Skirmish of Palos Prietos and the hard-fought Skirmish of Urias to break up the close blockade of the city by the Mexican commander. Afterward, behind defensive works designed by Henry Wager Halleck defended by a 400-man garrison, the city remained in American hands for the rest of the war, with only a few minor skirmishes with Mexican forces nearby.

Meanwhile, in Baja California Sur, on November 16, the Mexican resistance forces under Pineda descended on La Paz, attacking the American garrison and pro-American locals, but were repulsed. The following day at Guaymas, Col. Campuzano attempted to reoccupy Guaymas but was repulsed by a landing party of sailors and marines under Lieutenant W. T. Smith, supported by the guns of the USS Dale. On November 20–21 the local resistance forces under José Antonio Mijares were defeated in their attempt to capture San José del Cabo from the American garrison and pro-American militia. From November 27 – December 8, Manuel Pineda besieged La Paz ending in an American victory, when word came of the arrival of the USS Cyane at San José del Cabo from blockading San Blas.

On January 11, 1848, a landing party from the bark USS Whiton under Lieutenant Frederick Chatard, captured the coastal fort of San Blas and brought off two pieces of artillery and two schooners, one belonging to the custom-house. With no force sufficient to defend it and the port made defenseless, no American occupation of the city took place. A week later, on January 18, Lieutenant Chatard landed a small party at Manzanillo and spiked three large guns defending the port, rendering it defenseless.

From January 22 to February 15, Captain Pineda's forces besieged San José del Cabo. With the garrison nearly starving and low on water, the siege was relieved when the USS Cyane arrived with a relief force under Captain Seymour G. Steele and with part of the garrison under Lieutenant Charles Heywood defeated Pineda, breaking the siege. Soon afterward, Lt. Col. Henry S. Burton marched out against Pineda, surprised and captured him at San Antonio. Burton then marched on Todos Santos where the remaining Mexican forces were gathered under Governor Cota. On March 31, at the Skirmish of Todos Santos, Burton defeated Cota and broke up the remaining Mexican forces, after the Treaty of Guadalupe Hidalgo was already signed but before word of the March 6th truce had reached him.

== See also ==
- Baja California
- Baja California Sur

== Sources ==
- Richard W. Amero, "The Mexican-American War in Baja California", The Journal of San Diego History; Winter 1984, Volume 30, Number 1
- Karl Jack Bauer, The Mexican War, 1846–1848, U. of Nebraska Press, New York, 1992.
