= Siege of San José del Cabo =

- Part of the Mexican–American War
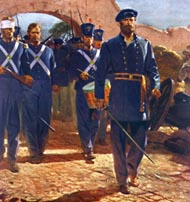
- American Marines during the Mexican War.
Date	January 22 – February 14, 1848 (3 weeks and 2 days)
Location	San José del Cabo, Baja California Sur
Result	American victory

Belligerents
United States	Mexico

Commanders and leaders
Charles Heywood (WIA) (surrendered)	Manuel Pineda Muñoz

Strength
27 marines 15 seaman 20 Californians; 102 Cyane sailors and marines	~300

Casualties and losses
3 killed 4 wounded 8 captured	13–35 killed

The siege of San José del Cabo, from January to February 1848, was a prolonged battle of the Mexican–American War in which Mexican militia besieged a smaller force of American marines, sailors and Californio militia. The final engagement during the battle involved half of the American garrison, and a landing party from a reinforcing warship, which successfully lifted the siege.

== Background ==
Following the Battle of San Jose del Cabo, Captain Manuel Pineda Muñoz of the Mexican Army initiated a siege. The Southampton departed for Mazatlan on 5 Dec., but the Portsmouth remained until 4 Jan. 1848, insuring the garrison's safety, while Commander Montgomery helped Lieutenant Charles Heywood strengthen its defenses "from the danger of another attack". The large windows of their mission fort was bricked in and a parapet raised on the roof. Augmented with two additional guns on carriages and 16 men from the Portsmouth, added to the 26 reinforcements the Southampton delivered earlier, brought the garrison to over 70.

== Siege ==
Passed midshipman James M. Duncan and Alexander P. Warley plus 6 other men were captured by the Mexican insurgents on 22 Jan., while seeking contact with a relief schooner. Pineda's force of 300 men, with Yaqui Indians, then attacked daily.

Cut off from the outside, the garrison, plus the 50 women and children within the port, were placed on "half allowance of salt provisions", without bread. On 7 February, one of the Californian volunteers was killed. By 10 February, Manuel Pineda's militia occupied all of the town except the cuartel or mission fort. On 11 February, Midshipman Tenant McLanahan was mortally wounded. The next day, the loyalists captured the garrison's water supply and a new well came under Mexican crossfire.

On 8 February, Lt. Archibald McRae of the La Paz garrison, had reached Heywood, ascertained the desperate situation, and then sailed for Mazatlan to inform Commodore William B. Shubrick, who dispatched the Southampton to La Paz, so the USS Cyane could relieve San Jose del Cabo. At sundown on 14 February at 3:30 pm, the Cyane reached the waters off San José del Cabo, and on the next morning, offloaded 89 seamen, 5 marines, and 8 officers, onto the beach along with a field piece under the command of Capt. Dupont.

The force from the Cyane advanced toward the hamlet of San Vicente, where the insurgents had concentrated, but this did not stop Dupont's advance, supported by the guns of the Cyane. Heywood took 30 of his men and attacked the Mexicans still occupying the town, and then joined up with the Cyane men.

== Aftermath ==
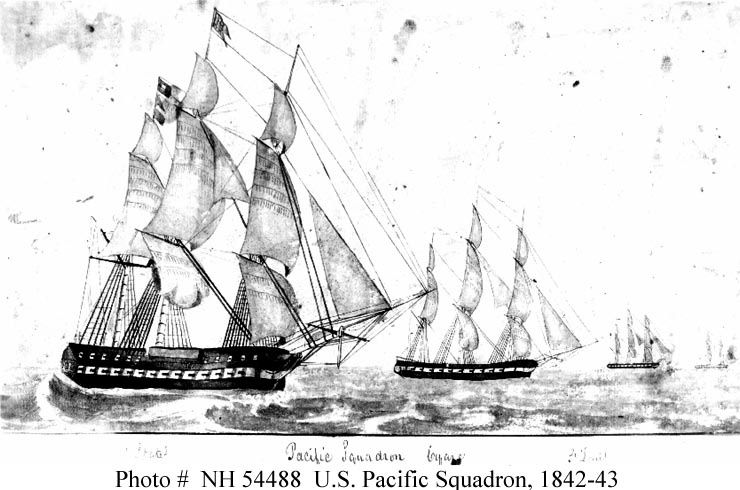
The United States Pacific Squadron before the Mexican War; USS Cyane is the second ship in line at roughly the center of the image.

The Mexicans retreated to Las Animas and then onto San Jose Viejo. The United States military sent reinforcements and would follow this victory up by going on the offensive under the command of Col. Burton from La Paz. The Americans captured Pineda in a raid on his headquarters at San Antonio, several miles south of La Paz. On March 30, 1848 Burton's forces defeated the remaining Mexican forces under Governor Castro in the Skirmish of Todos Santos and dispersed them. Soon after returning they learned of the March 6th Truce and the peace treaty.

== See also ==
- Texas Revolution
- Mexican Revolution
