= Skirmish of Todos Santos =

1848 battle of the Mexican–American War

- Part of the Mexican–American War
Date	March 30, 1848
Location	Todos los Santos, Baja California Sur
Result	American victory: End of the Mexican–American War; Treaty of Guadalupe Hidalgo

Belligerents
United States	Mexico

Commanders and leaders
Henry S. Burton; Henry M. Naglee	Mauricio Castro Cota

Strength
172 infantry, 45 mounted infantry	200 to 300 Mexicans and Yaqui Indians

Casualties and losses
None	10 (7 officers, and 103 soldiers captured)

Skirmish of Todos Santos (March 30, 1848), was the last clash of the Mexican–American War and ended eighteen months of hostilities in Baja California.

== Raid on San Antonio ==
Following the relief of the Siege of San José del Cabo, Colonel Henry S. Burton, ordered a raid on Captain Manuel Pineda's headquarters at San Antonio on March 15, 1848. San Antonio lay about 30 miles south of La Paz. Captain Seymour G. Steele, and Lt. Henry Halleck, led 34 men on a commando raid, killing three with the loss of one, and freeing the American prisoners captured at San Jose del Cabo on 22 Jan. Captain Pineda escaped capture in only his night clothes.

Meanwhile, the Military Governor of Alta California Richard B. Mason sent 114 recruits detached from Companies C and D of the 1st Regiment of New York Volunteers under the command of Captain Henry ("Black Jack") Naglee from Monterey, California to La Paz. They arrived on March 22, 1848 on the storeship Isabella. With Naglee's reinforcements, Colonel Burton could move against the enemy forces in the vicinity that were reported to be gathering against him without leaving La Paz open to attack.

== Expedition against San Antonio and Todos Santos ==
=== Capture of Pineda ===
On 26 March, Colonel Burton, with Captain Naglee and Lt. Halleck, and 217 men set out toward San Antonio. On the next day a detachment of 15 Americans again managed to surprise the Mexican forces at San Antonio and this time succeeded in capturing the Mexican commander, Manuel Pineda. Burton learned that the Baja Californians, under the command of Mauricio Castro, were concentrating at Todos Santos, prior to retreating toward Magdalena Bay, about fifty-five miles southwest of La Paz on the Pacific coast. Burton hastened to attack them before they made their escape.

=== Skirmish of Todos Santos ===
On March 30, as Burton's expedition neared Todos Santos, Burton sent Captain Naglee and 45 mounted men to attack the Mexican force from the rear. With a timely warning that the Californians were lying in ambush in some dense chaparral through which the road ran. Burton directed his detachment along a ridge of high tableland, providing a view of the enemy, some 200 to 300 Mexicans and Yaqui Indians. The Mexican force, responded by falling back to a hill overlooking Burton's force.

The action is described by Private William Redmond Ryan:

"At last, after many days and nights of weary marching, we came to a wide plain, all sand, and stones, and prickly bushes, but the path across which was so narrow as to oblige us to take to the Indian file again;.... However, in spite of the intense heat and dust, and of the burning thirst that devoured us, we pushed on in tolerable spirits, for we now began to distinguish the heights on which the town of Todos Santos is situated, and from which we were separated only by the plain we were now crossing. As we drew nearer, we plainly discerned the enemy dotted about on convenient elevations,...."

"The main body of the enemy, ... lay posted on the summit of a hill, beyond musket-shot, and apparently extremely well mounted and armed. As we drew nearer, they waved their flags by way of defiance, and commenced a dropping fire, which however did us no injury, although it served to animate our courage. Presently we commenced the ascent of the rugged steep on which they were so advantageously posted, when the firing became more sustained, and was returned by us with great spirit and with fatal effect."

"All at once we were saluted with a discharge of musketry from the borders of a dense forest of brushwood and cacti, stretching from the foot of the heights along the right side of the plain we had so recently cleared, and in which this ambuscade had been prepared for us; into this part of the forest the party I belonged to was ordered to plunge, and charge the enemy at the point of the bayonet; an order we executed with the rapidity of lightning, succeeding, after some hard fighting, in which a great number of Californians and Yakees were killed, in dislodging these sharp-shooters, whom we pursued with great spirit."

After the Mexicans had fired on Burton's men and had been engaged for some time, Naglee's company charged them from behind, routing the Mexican force by 5:30 PM. Burton reported this engagement cost the Mexicans ten men, the Americans none.

=== Naglee's Pursuit ===
Following the skirmish, Todos Santos was secured and the hungry American troops fed on sugar cane and green corn in the fields near the town. Burton sent Naglee and fifty men toward Magdalena Bay, about 150 miles northwest on the Pacific coast, to cut off the enemy's retreat. Meanwhile, Burton led his remaining force back to La Paz. With him were prisoners from his two engagements, Captain Pineda and six other officers, and 103 noncommissioned officers and privates. Burton arrived back in La Paz April 7.

Naglee's pursuit returned April 12, after having completed a march of 350 miles over narrow mule paths. His enemy mostly eluded him, he only captured five Mexican soldiers and also surprised a camp of sleeping Yaquis, two of whom were captured. Within a mile of La Paz, Naglee ordered these two captives shot in direct violation of his orders and a subsequent summons to a court-martial.

Private William Redmond Ryan writes about this incident:

"We had been back about ten days, when we heard of the return of Black Jack, and a party of fifty men, who had been sent out on an expedition to the head of the gulf; and the same person who brought this news likewise informed us that two Indians, whom they had captured some fifty miles off and conducted hither, had just been shot by command of this officer. Several of us went to the spot where the tragedy had been enacted, and there saw the two dead bodies, and several of our men digging graves in the sand. I felt deep disgust, when I came to learn the particulars of this murder, which seemed to have been perpetrated without any pretext, even regarding it in the light of an execution. It appeared that they had surrendered themselves prisoners, and the men had spared their lives, notwithstanding Black Jack's orders that every Indian they took should be shot on the spot. He justified the act, by asserting that they had committed violence on some women at one of the ranches, where the party had halted some days before; but this was the first the men had heard of it, and the whole story was besides so improbable, seeing that the men had never been lost sight of, that it could be attributed to nothing save a reckless spirit of blood-shedding. I afterwards ascertained that one of the victims was a Yakee; the other a native of La Paz, who had joined this Indian tribe. His mother and his sister were both kneeling over his corpse, and giving way to their grief in the most frantic manner. The general impression was, that presuming their guilt, they ought to have been at least tried, especially as they had reached headquarters; and I remember that the feeling became very strong against Black Jack on account of this sad event, which we looked upon as calculated to get us a name for cruelty we really did not deserve."

Colonel Mason, military governor of Alta California, later ordered Naglee arrested; however Naglee escaped punishment when a pardon was granted to military and naval offenders acting in wartime by President Polk.

== Aftermath ==
By 5 April, returning to San Jose del Cabo, was the Alcalde of Miraflores, and 23 prisoners, including Jefe Politico Mauricio Castro, taken by an expedition led by Lt. George L. Selden of the USS Cyane. Meanwhile, other officers had brought in a number of prisoners, among them Padre Gabriel Gonzalez, as well as two of his sons, who were serving as officers in the army. Gonzalez, was considered shrewd, energetic and one leader who the Americans feared more than the other military leaders in Baja California. The prisoners were sent to Mazatlan and released on parole. The volunteers continued to garrison the peninsula unmolested until they went back to Alta California to be disbanded.

== See also ==
- 1848 in Mexico
