= Pacific campaign =

Pacific campaign or Pacific campaigns, usually refers to the Pacific War (1941–1945): campaigns involving Allied and Axis forces, in the Pacific and Asia during World War II.

Within the context of World War II, "Pacific campaigns" include:

- Pacific Ocean theater of World War II: the naval and island campaigns in the Central Pacific, North Pacific and South Central Pacific, and;
- South West Pacific theater of World War II: the campaigns in and around the Philippines, New Guinea, Australia, most of the Dutch East Indies (Indonesia) and the British colonies in Borneo.

Pacific theater of operations is a generic term, in US military history, for all campaigns in the Pacific during World War II.

Pacific campaign may also refer to the following campaigns in other wars:

- Pacific Coast campaign (Mexican–American War) (1846–1848) United States Navy operations during the Mexican–American War
- Pacific campaign (Spanish–American War), between the United States and Spain during the Spanish–American War of 1898
- Asian and Pacific theatre of World War I (1914–1918), between the Allies and the German Empire
