= Gabriel González =

Gabriel González may refer to:

- Gabriel González (Argentine footballer) (born 1980), Argentine football forward
- Gabriel González (baseball) (born 2004), Venezuelan baseball outfielder
- Gabriel González (journalist), Venezuelan journalist
- Gabriel González (Mexican footballer) (born 1988), Mexican football midfielder
- Gabriel Gonzalez (musician) (1967–2024), American musician (No Doubt, Save Ferris)
- Gabriel González (Paraguayan footballer) (born 1961), Paraguayan football midfielder
- Gabriel Gonzalez Pereyra (1789–1868), Dominican priest, Bajacalifornio guerrilla in the Mexican–American War
- Gabriel González (referee) (born 1942), Paraguayan football referee
- Gabriel González Videla (1898–1980), Chilean politician, president in 1946–1952
- Gabe González (born 1972), Major League Baseball pitcher
