= Miraflores, Baja California Sur =

Town in State of Baja California Sur, Mexico

Coordinates: 23°22′5″N 109°46′40″W

Miraflores is a small town in the Municipality of Los Cabos (Baja California Sur). Miraflores is located about 45 miles north of San Jose del Cabo, 2 km west of Highway 1, just to the east of the Sierra de la Laguna. Miraflores is 220 meters above sea level. As of 2010, the town had a population of 1,384.

== History ==
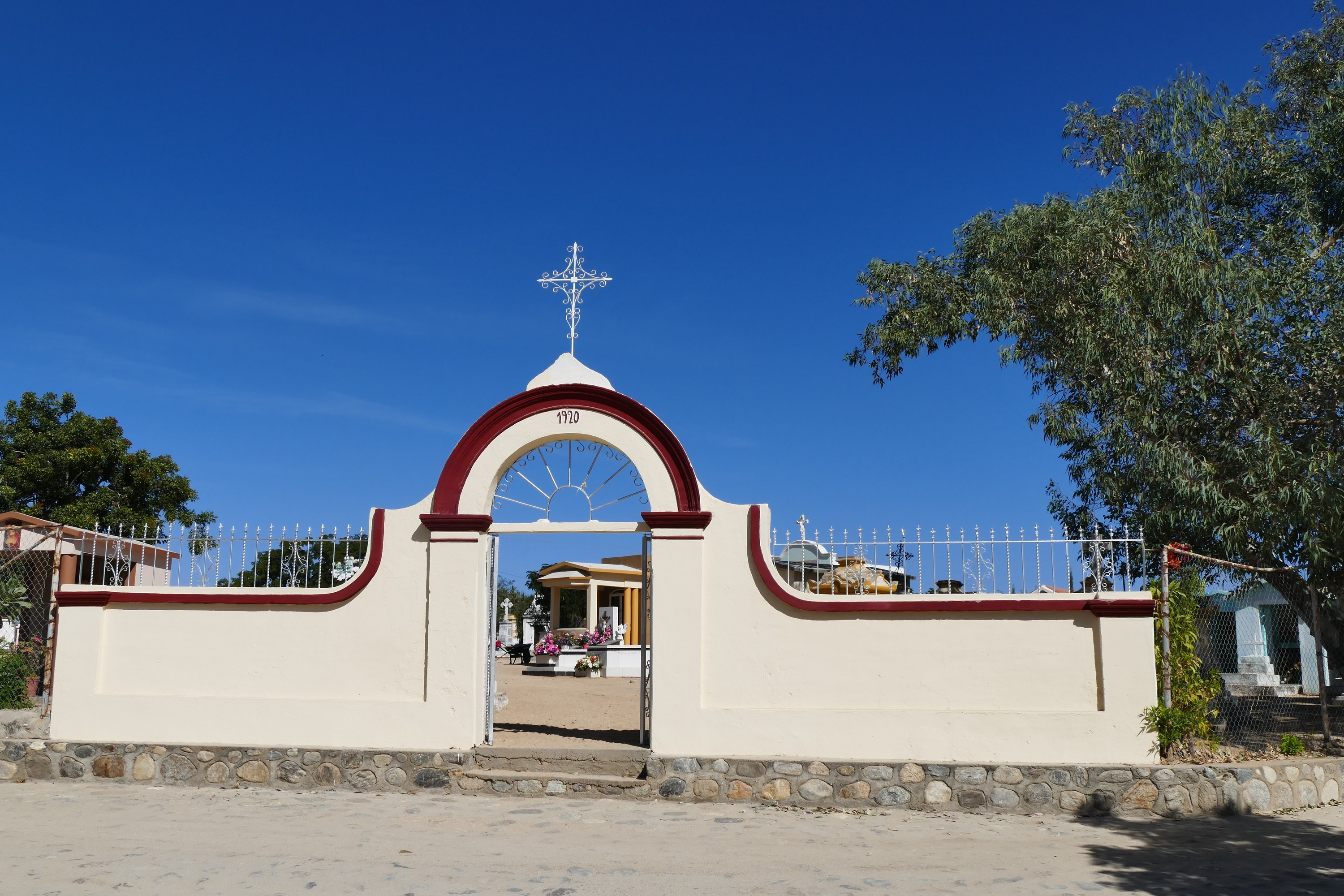
Miraflores - Cimetière

The town's history dates back two centuries to when six English sailors deserted a whaling ship. They learned Spanish, converted to Catholicism and married into the community. The local cemetery has English family names on some of the old headstones.

During the Mexican American War, following the Skirmish of Todos Santos the civil authorities of Miraflores delivered Mauricio Castro, who had replaced Manuel Pineda as commander of the Mexican forces in Baja California, to Lieutenant George L. Selden of the Cyane on April 2, 1848.
