= Naglee Park, San Jose =

Naglee Park
- Neighborhood of San Jose
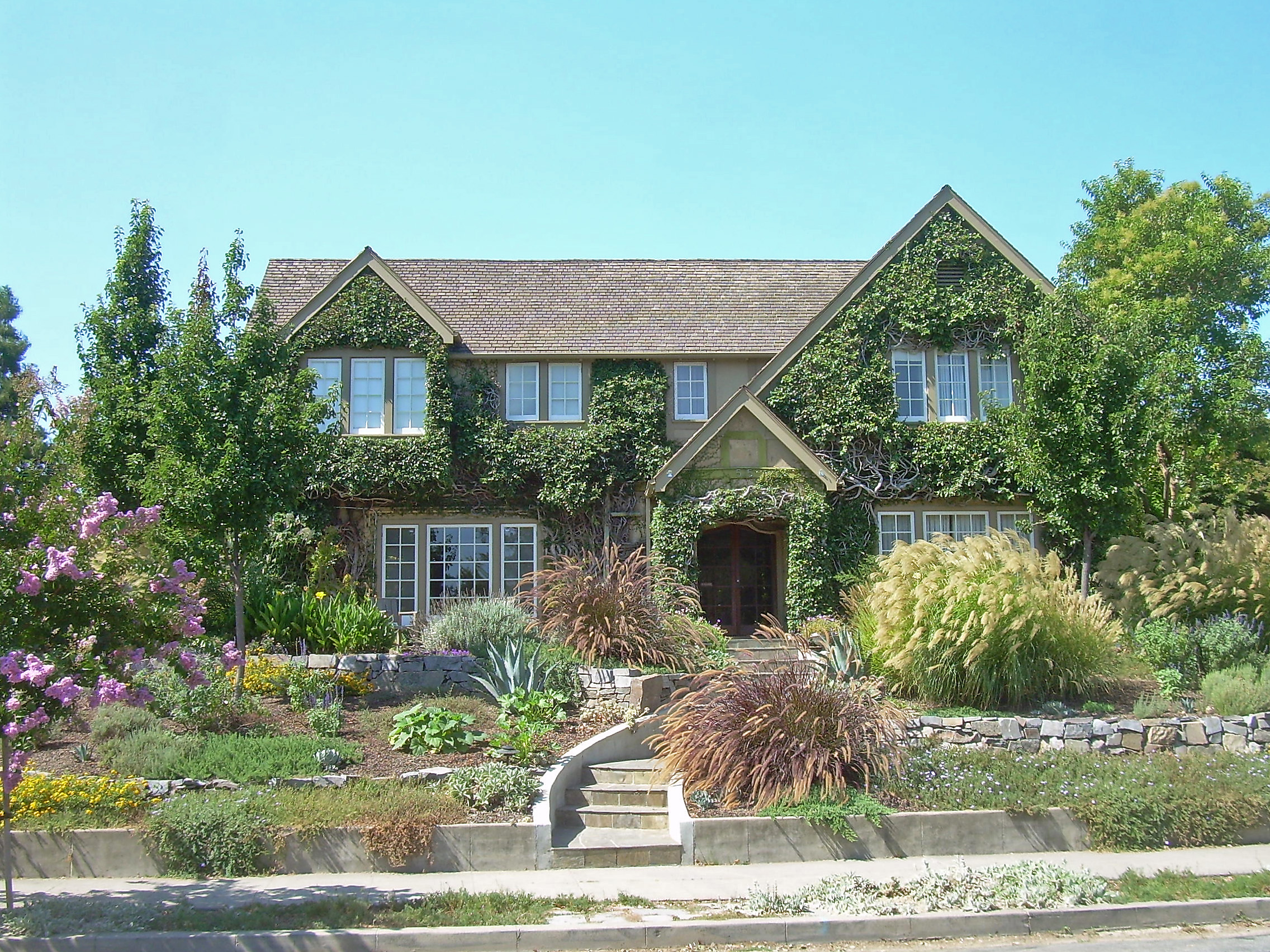
- A historic Naglee Park mansion.

- Location within San Jose
- Coordinates: 37.33779°N 121.87476°W
- Country: United States
- State: California
- County: Santa Clara
- City: San Jose
- Zip Code: 95112
- Website: https://www.nagleepark.org

Naglee Park is a historic residential neighborhood in San Jose, California, to the east of Downtown San Jose and San Jose State University.

== History ==
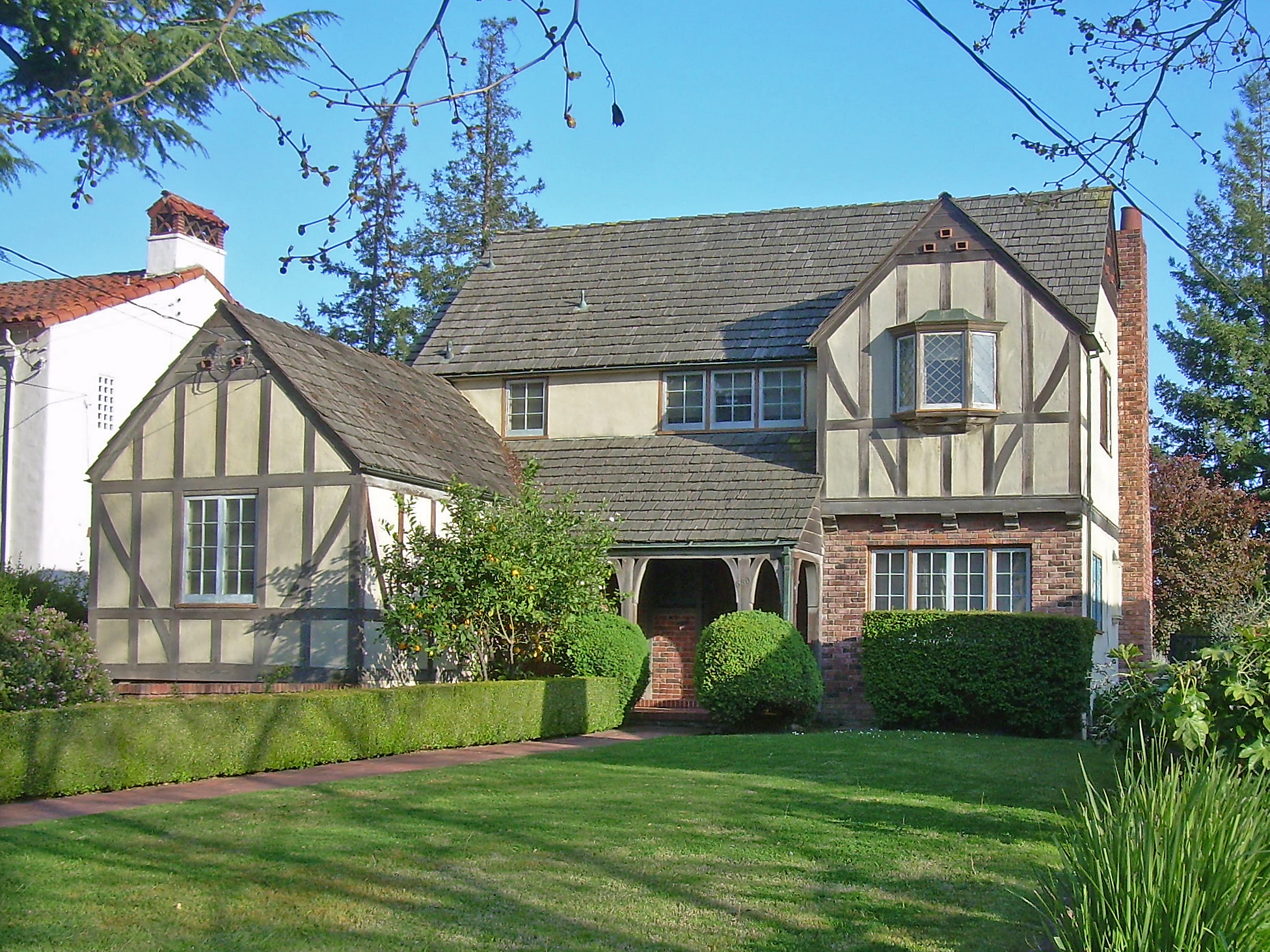
Naglee Park is home to numerous historic mansions and homes.

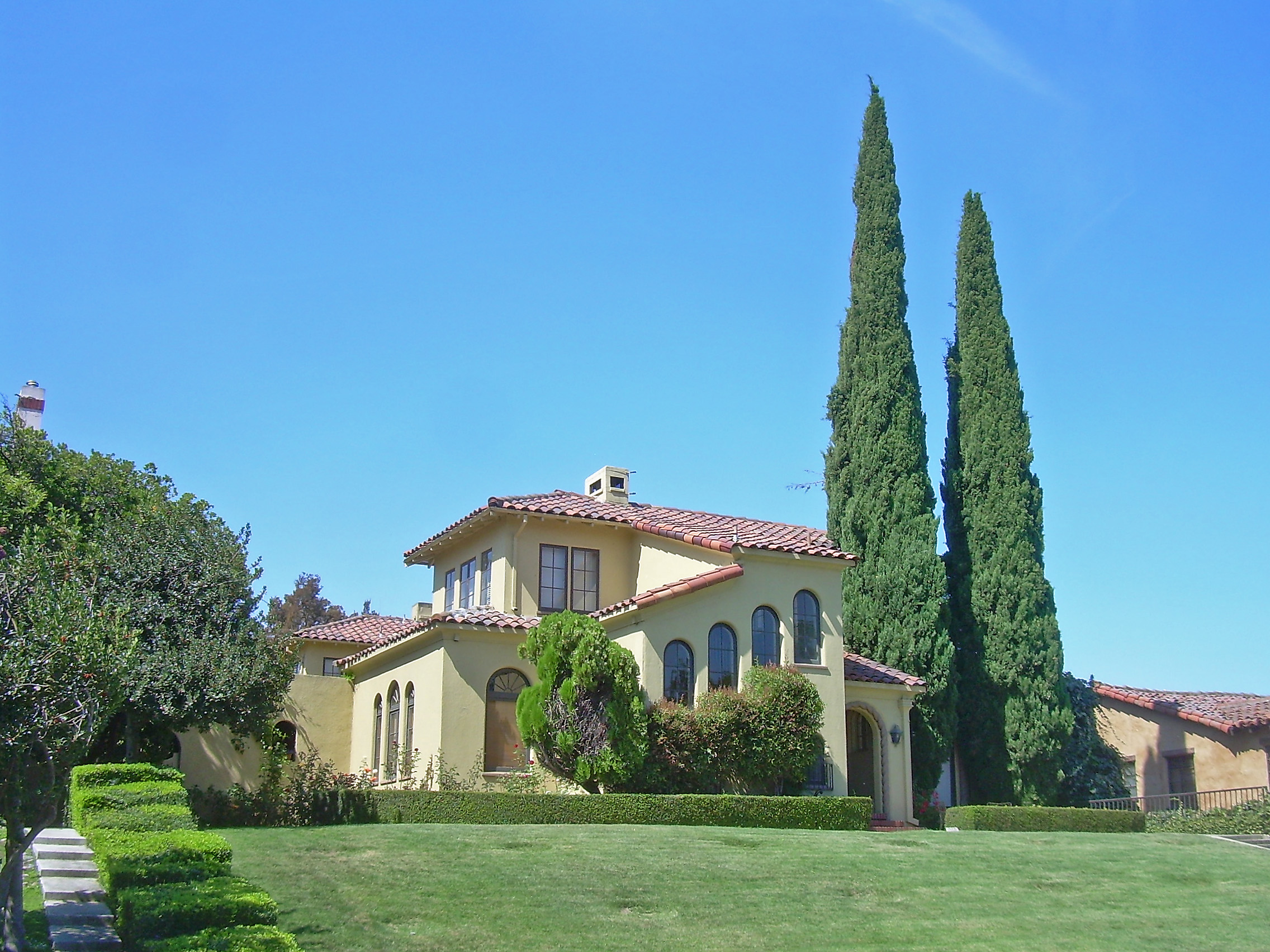
The eastern part of Naglee Park has is characterized by mansions and large homes.

Much of the Naglee Park neighborhood was developed on the grounds of the estate of Civil War Brigadier General Henry Morris Naglee. The Naglee estate was famous for its gardens and vineyards. In 1902, nearly 20 years after General Naglee's death, the estate was subdivided to form the Naglee Park neighborhood. The Naglee Park Subdivision is bounded by E Santa Clara Street, E William Street, South 11th Street, and Coyote Creek. Many of the homes were constructed in the early 1900s, but few date from before 1906 because of the 1906 San Francisco earthquake. These houses were built for many early Santa Clara Valley professionals and are historically significant. The Naglee Terrace Subdivision is bounded by East William Street, East Margaret Street, Coyote Creek (William Street Park), and South 11th Street.

In 1958 a group of property owners were successful in changing the neighborhood zoning to allow multifamily development. Attempts had started in the 1940s with residents who were leaving the area and felt they could get better prices with less restrictive zoning. After San Jose State began to allow students to live off campus, in 1968, students moved into the area. About 70% of board and care facilities for mentally disabled people moved into the neighborhood, after changes to state policies, because of low prices in the late 1960s and early 1970s. Banks redlined the area until 1973 when the neighborhood association convinced the city to not deposit money in particular banks until they began lending in the area again. The neighborhood was zoned back into single-family homes in 1978 at the request of neighborhood residents.

In the 1950s through 1970s, the neighborhood was heavily impacted by growth of the University and downtown. Many of the larger homes were converted into apartments or board and care facilities.

The Campus Community Association (CCA) is the active neighborhood association in Naglee Park. The CCA sponsors neighborhood events such as Bark in the Park, the 4th of July parade and block party, and Christmas social.

== Geography ==
The general boundaries of the neighborhood are Santa Clara Street, 11th Street, Interstate 280, and Coyote Creek. The local high school is San Jose High School.
