= Battle of La Paz =

Battle between the U.S. and Mexico as part of the Pacific Coast Campaign

- Part of the Pacific Coast Campaign
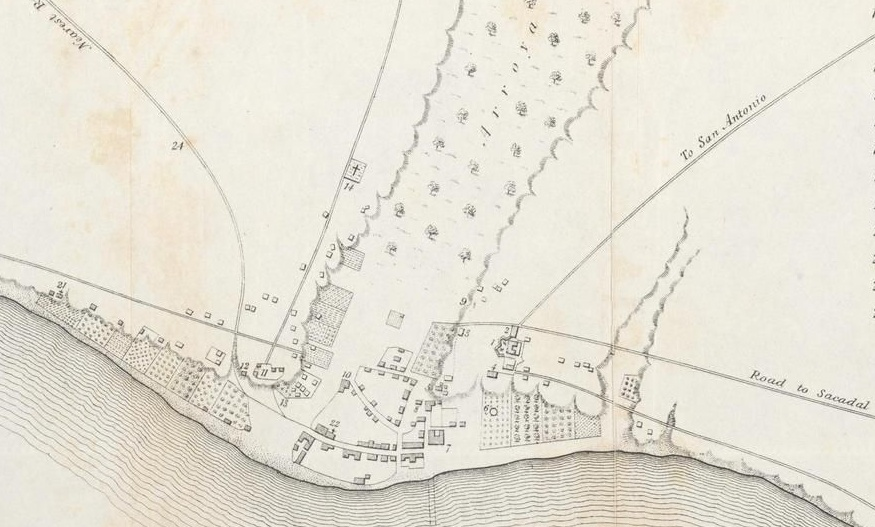
- La Paz disposition of forces in 1847
Date	November 16–17, 1847
Location	La Paz, Baja California Sur 24°08′N 110°18′W
Result	American victory

Belligerents
United States	Mexico

Commanders and leaders
(United States) Henry S. Burton	(Mexico) Manuel Pineda Muñoz

Strength
115 infantry	200 militia

Casualties and losses
1 killed	6 killed

The Battle of La Paz was an engagement of the Pacific Coast Campaign during the Mexican–American War. The belligerents were United States Army troops against Mexican militia, commanded by Mexican Army officers. The battle occurred on November 16 and 17, 1847.

== Background ==
In late September, Captain Manuel Pineda Muñoz of the Mexican Army began to assemble a large militia force of farmers and ranchers to defend the Gulf of California region of Mexico from the invading United States military. Hundreds of men were among Pineda's ranks. In March and April 1847, the 1st Regiment of New York Volunteers, an American volunteer regiment from New York State, arrived in San Francisco, California.

Their mission was to reinforce the United States Navy and marines, occupying various Mexican ports to the south and also to take ports themselves. Lieutenant Colonel Henry S. Burton, of the United States Army, was in command. On May 30, 1847, Burton received orders to embark the sloop-of-war USS Lexington with companies A and B and proceed to La Paz for its capture.

On 21 July, 115 men from the Seventh Regiment of New York Volunteers landed peacefully at La Paz. Lieutenant E. Gould Buffum, of Company B, later described the port city: "The houses were all of adobe, plastered white, and thatched with the leaves of the palm tree, and were most delightfully cool. The whole beach was lined with palms, date, fig, tamarind and coconut trees, their delicious fruit hanging down on them in clusters."

Following the Battle of Mulege, Pineda, as Commandante en Jefe de la Guerilla Guadalupana, set up a provisional capital at San Antonio, raised taxes for defense, started resistance in Oct. at San Jose del Cabo, Comondu and Mulege, and plundered any American sympathizers. By Nov., Pineda had 300-500 insurgents gathered at San Antonio.

Before departing to capture Mazatlan on 11 Nov., William Shubrick landed 4 sailors and 20 marines at San Jose del Cabo.

Burton's La Paz garrison occupied two houses on the plain commanding the town, on the south side of The Arroyo, with a breastwork of palm logs in front of the officer's house for the 6-pounders. Additionally, Burton's men used palm logs to barricade the space between the officer's quarters, the church and a house on the west side of town.

== Battle ==
At 2 AM on 16 Nov., Pineda's brigade of 200 men attacked the American garrison of La Paz, from the north side of The Arroyo with infantry, while the cavalry waited in the east and south waiting to charge. Pineda's men fired upon the Americans for about an hour before stopping, waiting until 9 AM to advance, but their advance slackened by 2 PM. Pineda with 50 men was able to burn former governor Francisco Palacios de Miranda's house, and briefly occupy a house on the lower part of town, before spherical case shot and canister shot forced their retreat, killing 6.

On the morning of 17 Nov., Burton's spherical case shot drove some Mexicans from another house, after which he destroyed the houses on the north side of The Arroyo, strengthened his breastworks, and the roofs of the houses he occupied.

== Aftermath ==
Pineda's men withdrew but continued to hover about the garrison, eventually resulting in the Siege of La Paz.
