= Henry Morris Naglee =

Union Army General (1815–1886)

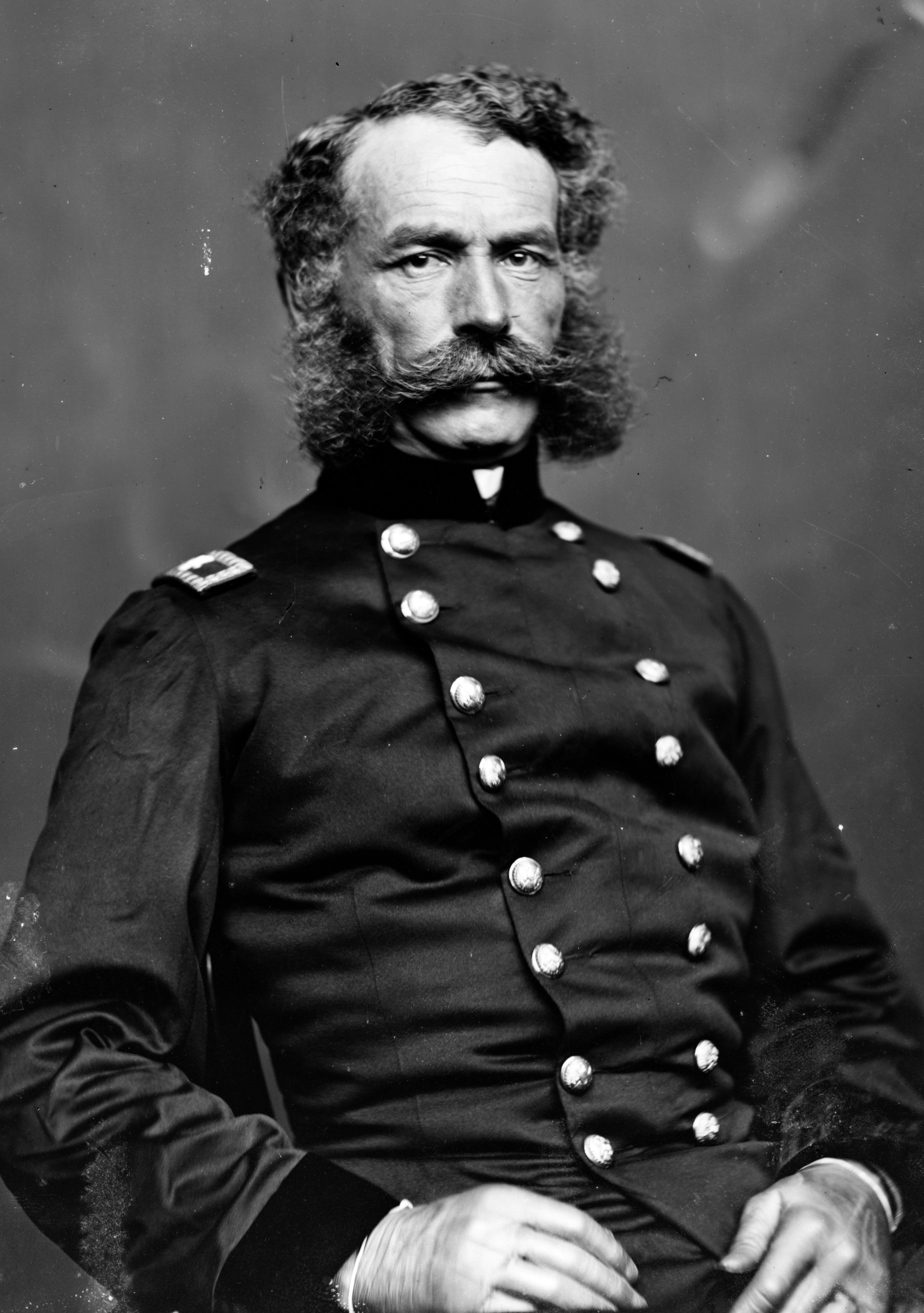
- Henry Morris Naglee
- Born: January 15, 1815; Philadelphia, Pennsylvania, U.S.
- Died: March 5, 1886 (aged 71); San Francisco, California, U.S.
- Burial place: Laurel Hill Cemetery, Philadelphia, Pennsylvania, U.S.
- Military career
- Allegiance: United States; Union
- Branch: United States Army; Union Army
- Service years: 1835, 1846–1848, 1861–1864
- Rank: Brigadier General
- Units: 5th U.S. Infantry; 16th U.S. Infantry
- Commands: 1st Brigade, 3rd Division, IV Corps; VII Corps; District of Virginia
- Conflicts: Mexican–American War; Skirmish of Todos Santos; American Civil War; Peninsula campaign; Battle of Yorktown; Battle of Williamsburg; Battle of Seven Pines
- Other work: civil engineer, banker, viticulturist

Henry Morris Naglee (January 15, 1815 – March 5, 1886) was an American military officer and vintner. He served as a captain in the Mexican-American War, as commanding officer of the California Guards and as a brigadier general in the Union army during the American Civil War. He established a successful vineyard and distilled a brandy named Naglia which earned him a reputation as the "Father of Californian brandy". After his death, his 140-acre estate and vineyards became the Naglee Park neighborhood of San Jose, California.

== Early life and education ==
Naglee was born in Philadelphia, Pennsylvania, on January 15, 1815. He graduated from the United States Military Academy in 1835 as 23rd in a class of 56 cadets. Posted in the 5th U.S. Infantry he resigned shortly after his graduation and worked as a civil engineer for railroad construction in Virginia and Alabama.

== Mexican-American War ==
Naglee came to California in 1846 during the Mexican–American War as captain of Company D of the 1st Regiment of New York Volunteers. He commanded a detachment of volunteers to La Paz in Baja California and fought in the Skirmish of Todos Santos where he led 45 mounted soldiers into the Mexican rear, which led to the collapse of their resistance. In the following pursuit he ordered the killing of two captured Mexicans without orders, for which the military governor of Alta California, Colonel Richard B. Mason, ordered Naglee arrested. When President Polk granted a pardon to military and naval offenders acting in wartime, Naglee escaped punishment for this crime.

== California Guards ==
After his discharge from the army, in 1849, Naglee became the first commanding officer of the 1st California Guards, a California Militia unit in San Francisco, the beginning of what would become the California National Guard.

== Business career ==
He entered into banking and purchased 140 acres in Santa Clara, California in 1848. In 1858, Naglee studied viticulture in Europe. He built an estate and planted vineyards of Riesling and Charbono grapes, from which he distilled a clear brandy named Naglia. His high-quality brandy and his viticultural knowledge earned him a reputation as the "Father of Californian brandy".

== American Civil War ==
In May 1861 Naglee reentered the United States Army as lieutenant colonel of the 16th U.S. Infantry. As the regiment's recruitment took longer and longer Naglee's want for active service made him resign in January 1862. Naglee was made a brigadier general of Volunteers the next month and given command of a brigade in the IV Corps of the Army of the Potomac under command of general Silas Casey.

During the Battle of Seven Pines, he commanded the First Brigade in the Second Division under brigadier general John J. Peck. During the Peninsula Campaign he fought in the Battle of Seven Pines on May 31. His brigade and the whole division distinguished themselves when they were attacked, but had to fall back in the end. Naglee himself had his horse killed under him and received four wounds from musket-balls. While both praise and blame were given to the division, and Naglee, he wrote a number of reports and letters, increasing his role in the battle, that sparked great criticism and animosity. Later that year he commanded a brigade and a division in North Carolina, participating in the relief of Washington. In 1863 he commanded the VII Corps and the District of Virginia. In 1864 he was mustered out of the army and returned to San Jose to resume banking and brandy making. He also actively campaigned in the election of General McClellan for the Democratic Party.

== Personal life ==
In 1865 he married 24 years old Marie Antoinette Ringgold, the daughter of his friend George Hays Ringgold and descendant to President James Monroe. From this marriage were born two daughters, Marie, in 1866, and Antoinette, in 1869. Mrs. Naglee died in 1869 and Naglee never remarried.

Naglee was involved in two public scandals. In 1865, Mary Schell, whom Naglee had met in 1858 and corresponded with while at war, published his love letters in a book entitled The Love Life of Brigadier General Henry M. Naglee, Consisting of a correspondence on Love, War and Politics, after he broke off their relationship. In 1877 his nanny Emily Hanks filed a lawsuit against Naglee, claiming he proposed marriage to her and then seduced her. This led to two trials and three years of headlines in the local newspapers. The court ruled in Hanks's favor in the first trial, but in Naglee's in the second.

== Death and legacy ==
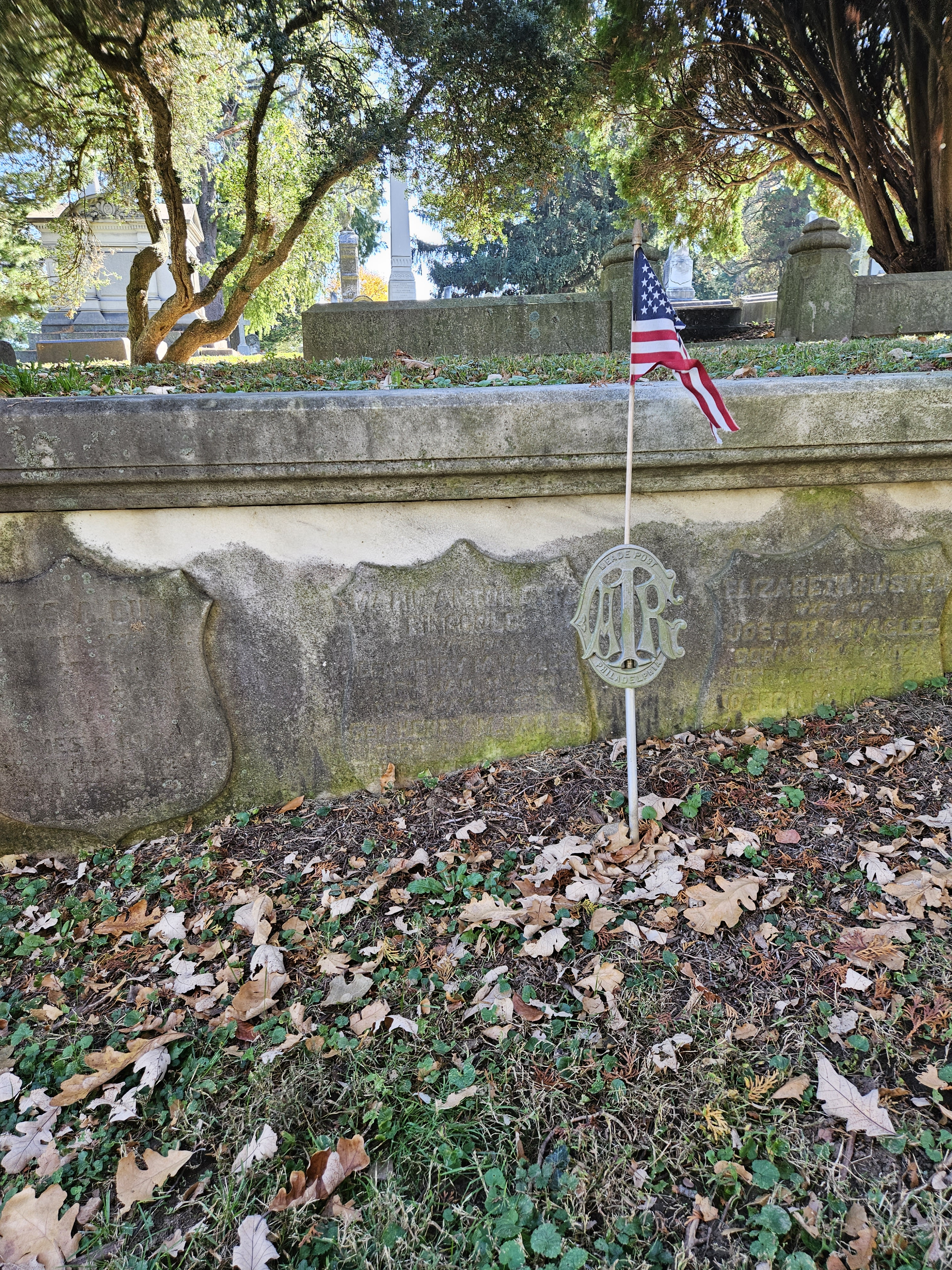
Henry Morris Naglee tombstone in Laurel Hill Cemetery

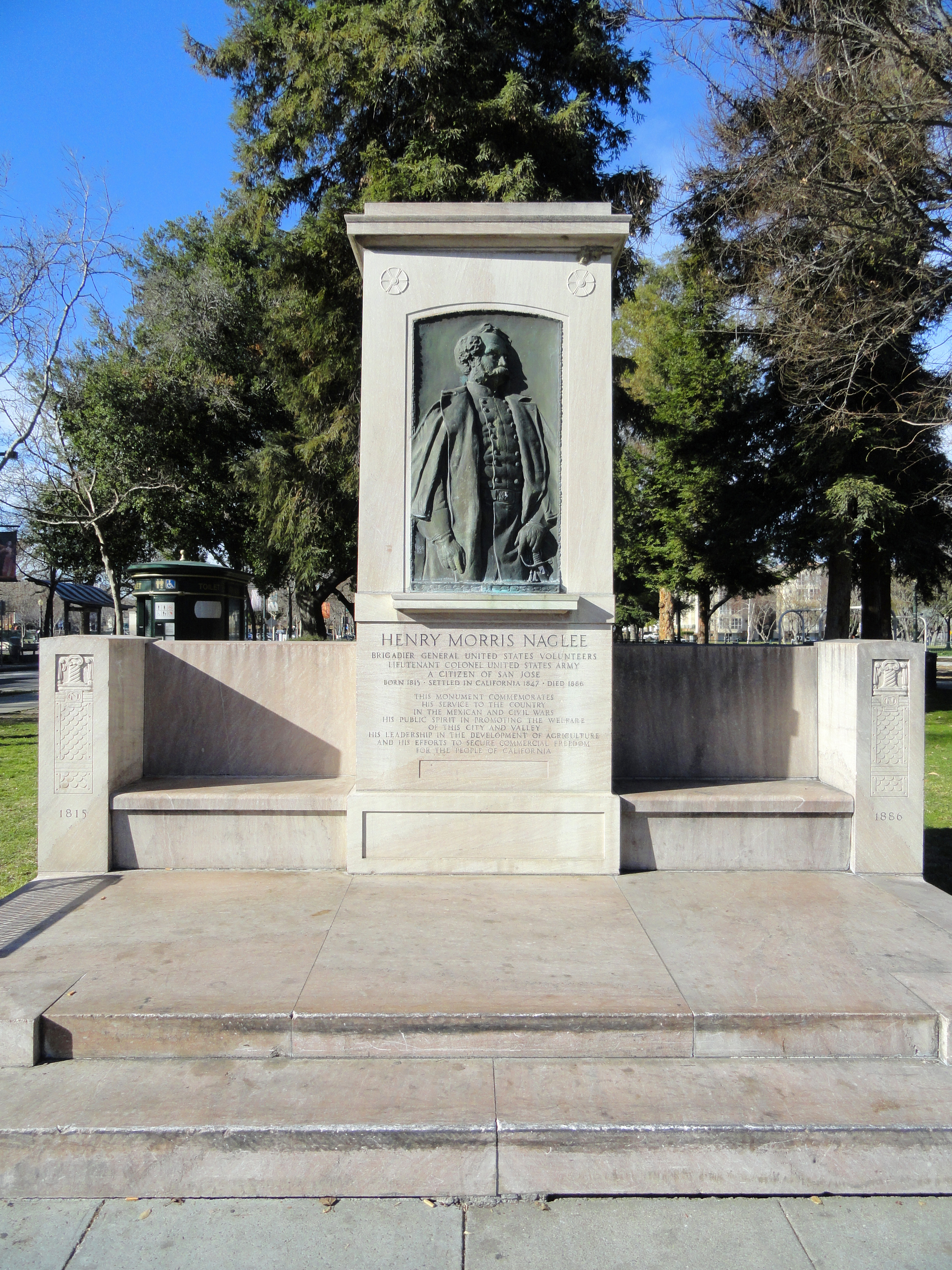
Henry Morris Naglee Memorial in St. James Park

Henry Naglee died of "neuralgia of the bowels" at the Occidental Hotel in San Francisco on March 5, 1886, and was interred in Laurel Hill Cemetery in Philadelphia. His estate was developed into the residential Naglee Park neighborhood in 1902 by his daughters. A memorial was erected in St. James Park in San Jose to honor Naglee.

== Published works ==
- Report of Brig. Gen. Henry M. Naglee, Commanding First Brigade, Casey's Division, Army of the Potomac, of the Part Taken by his Brigade in the Battle of Seven Pines., Philadelphia: Collins, Printer, 1862
- The Love Life of Brig. Gen. Henry M. Naglee, Consisting of a Correspondence on Love, War and Politics., Hilton & Company, 1867

== See also ==
- List of American Civil War generals (Union)
