= El Triunfo, Baja California Sur =

Town in La Paz Municipality, Baja California Sur, Mexico

Coordinates: 23°48′14″N 110°06′22″W

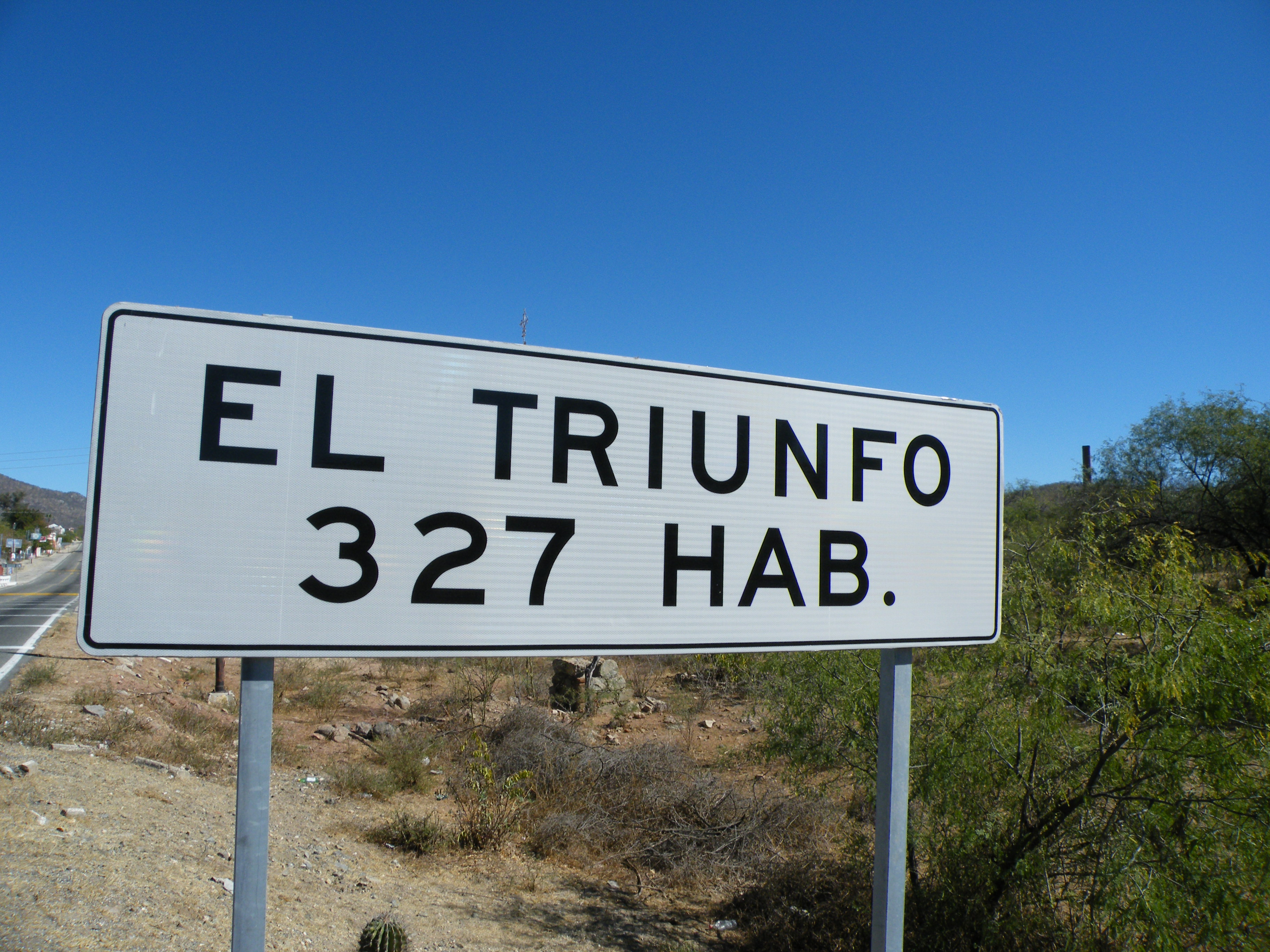
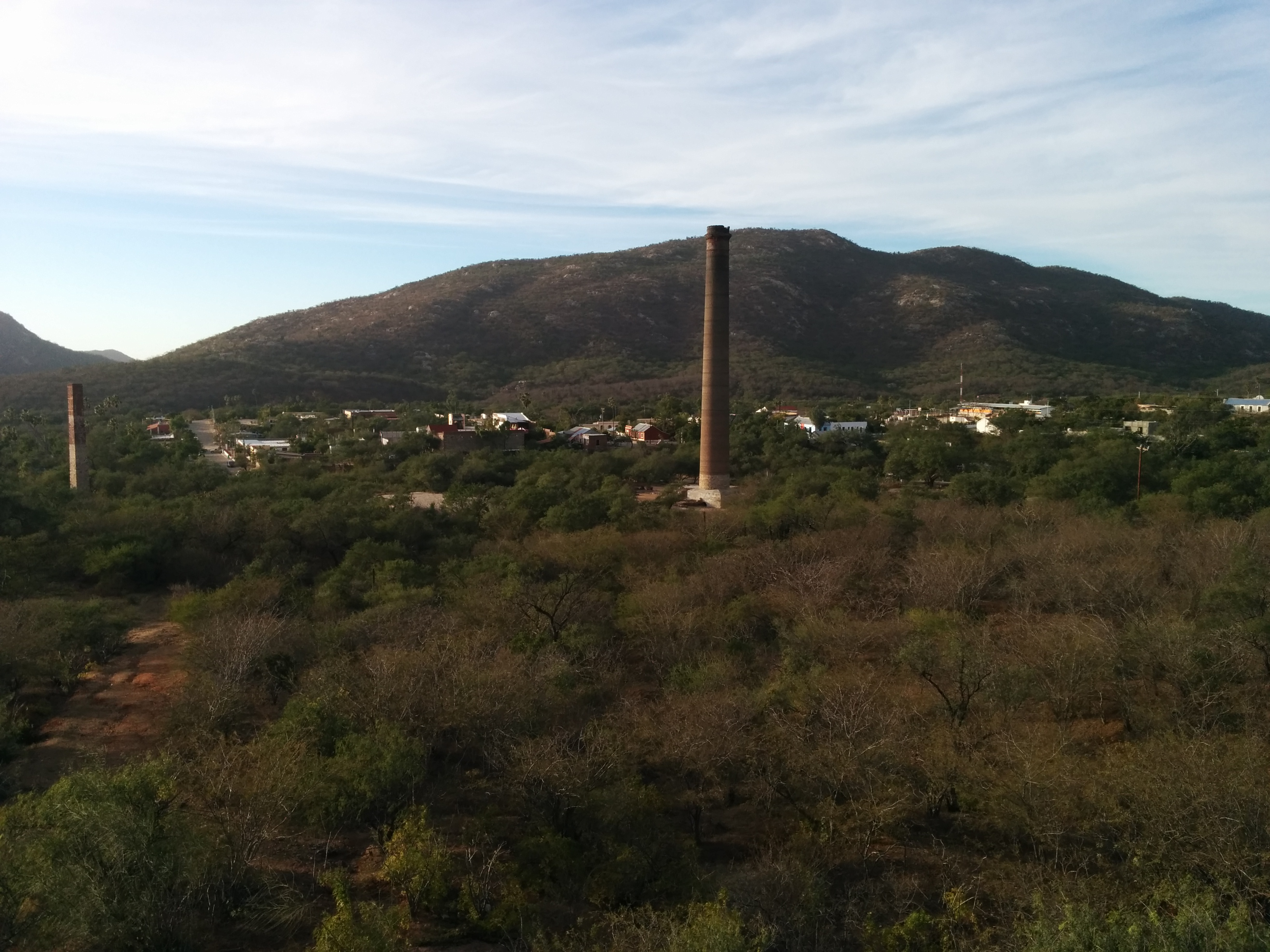

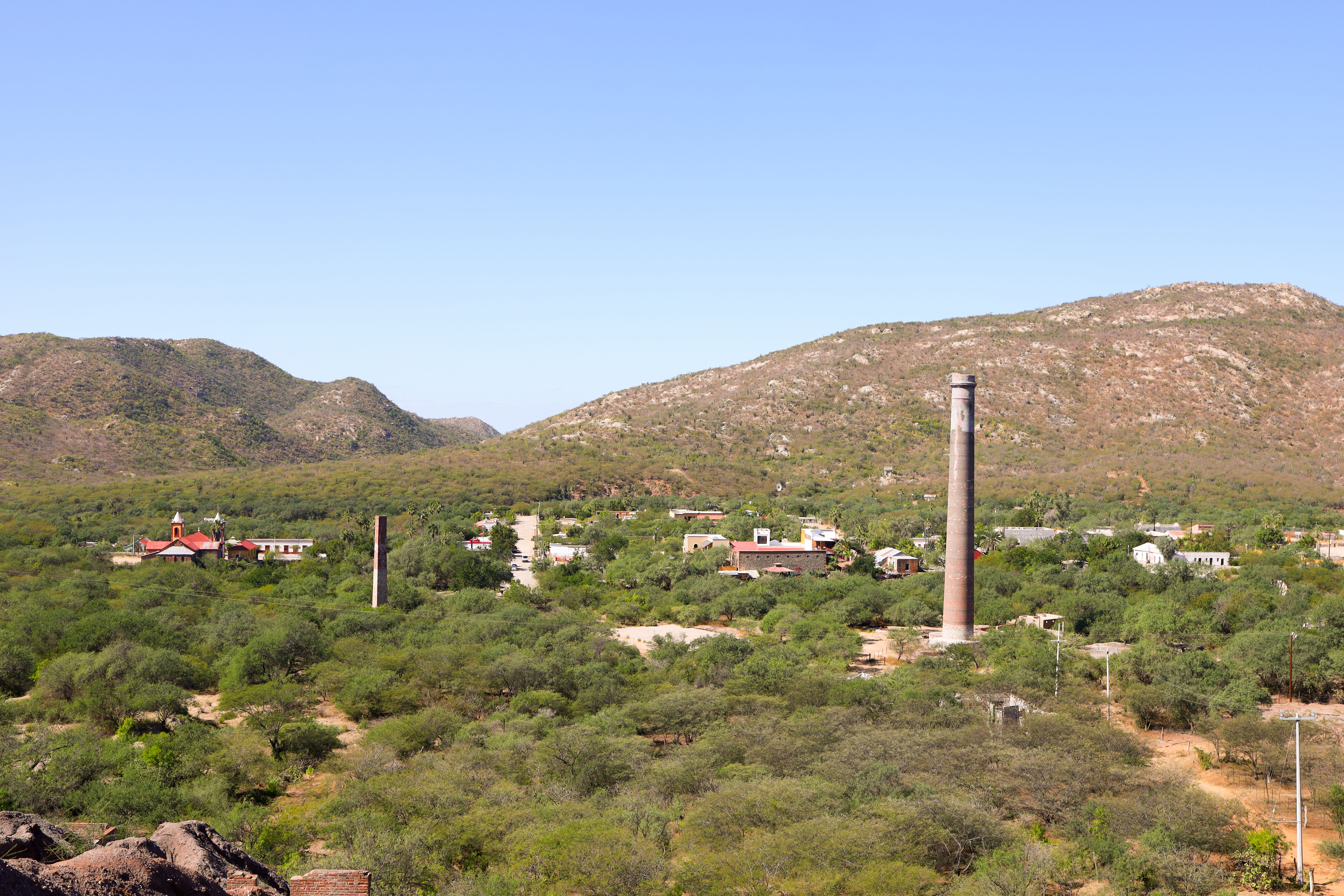
Panoramic view of El Triunfo in November 2021

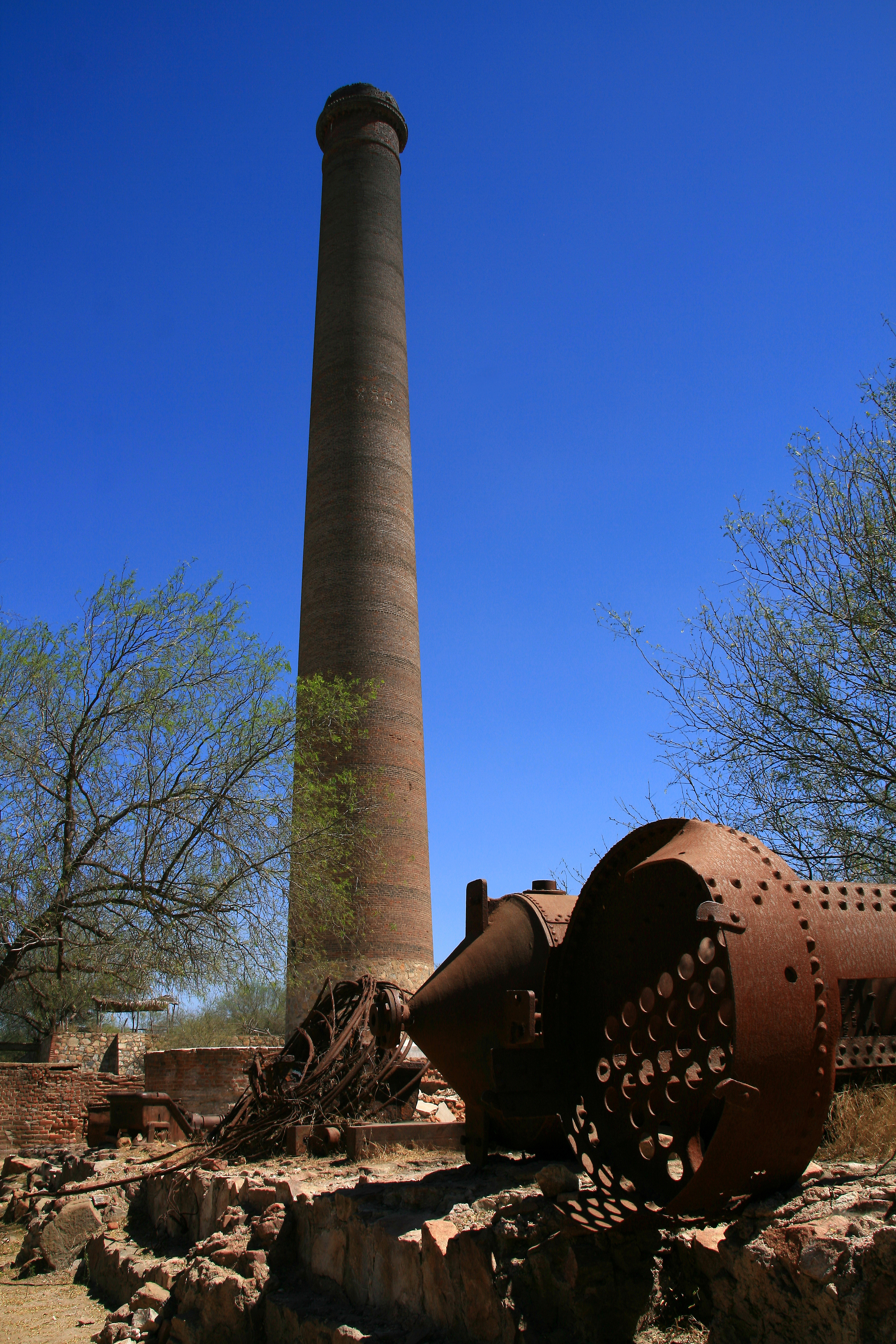
A closer look at "La Ramona"

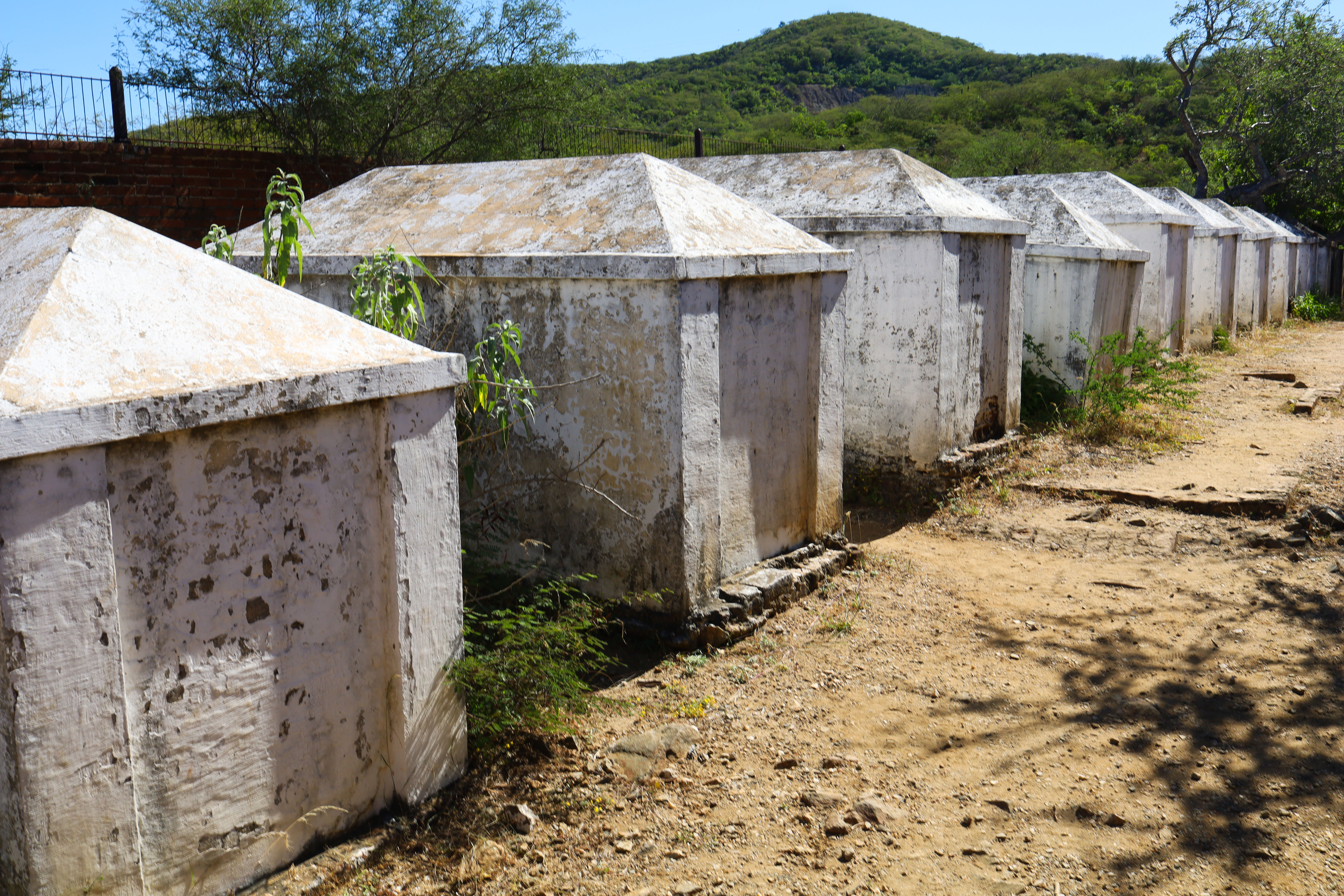
English cemetery above El Triunfo

El Triunfo is a town in La Paz Municipality, Baja California Sur, Mexico, about 4.5 miles north of San Antonio. The town is located at an elevation of 483 meters (1,585 feet) above sea level and has a population of 313 as 2020. It is a former mining town.

== History ==
The first mine in El Triunfo was established by Manuel de Ocio in the late 1700s. Ownership of the mine was temporarily transferred to the Spanish Crown at one point. However, the mine remained largely unsuccessful until 1878, where ownership of the mine was transferred.

In 1862, silver and gold were discovered in the southern Baja California Sur mountains, leading miners from Mexico and the United States to rush to settle in El Triunfo in a gold rush. Many of the miners had participated in the 1849 California gold rush. In 1878, the mine was taken over by the British El Progreso Mining Company and became more successful. Once the largest city in Baja California Sur, it was home to more than 10,000 miners. In its heyday the town was a cultural center, where Francisca Mendoza taught and performed. El Triunfo was the first town in the region to install electricity and telephones. Pianos and other instruments were brought to El Triunfo from around the world and a piano museum still exists. When mines shut down in 1926, most of the townspeople left to look for work elsewhere. The 2010 census reported a population of 327 inhabitants. El Triunfo is one of the best preserved 19th and 20th century mining communities in North America and remains an important site for archaeological research.

A notable feature of the town is the 47-meter-high smokestack constructed in 1890 for El Progreso Mining Company. It is called "La Ramona", named after Saint Raymond, on whose feast day the project was completed on. The smokestack was once thought to be designed by Gustave Eiffel, though no conclusive evidence of his involvement in the project has been located. After more than 100 years, the smokestack was cracked and damaged and collapse during an earthquake or hurricane was a concern. In 2018, the nonprofits International Community Foundation (ICF) and the Corredor Histórico CAREM, A.C. collaborated to restore La Ramona for an estimated US$200,000.

In recent years, to attract tourism, many of the original buildings have been restored and converted into restaurants, museums, boutiques and other locations.

== Climate ==
Climate data for El Triunfo, Baja California Sur (1991–2020 normals, extremes 1961–present)
Month	Jan	Feb	Mar	Apr	May	Jun	Jul	Aug	Sep	Oct	Nov	Dec	Year
Record high °C (°F)	38 (100)	37 (99)	39 (102)	42 (108)	41 (106)	42 (108)	40 (104)	40 (104)	41 (106)	39 (102)	39 (102)	35 (95)	42 (108)
Mean daily maximum °C (°F)	24.8 (76.6)	25.8 (78.4)	28.5 (83.3)	30.6 (87.1)	33.8 (92.8)	35.1 (95.2)	35.4 (95.7)	34.6 (94.3)	32.5 (90.5)	31.9 (89.4)	29.1 (84.4)	25.1 (77.2)	30.6 (87.1)
Daily mean °C (°F)	17.6 (63.7)	18.2 (64.8)	19.8 (67.6)	21.1 (70.0)	23.5 (74.3)	26.0 (78.8)	27.6 (81.7)	27.4 (81.3)	25.9 (78.6)	23.9 (75.0)	20.8 (69.4)	17.7 (63.9)	22.5 (72.5)
Mean daily minimum °C (°F)	10.4 (50.7)	10.5 (50.9)	11.2 (52.2)	11.6 (52.9)	13.2 (55.8)	16.9 (62.4)	19.8 (67.6)	20.1 (68.2)	19.3 (66.7)	15.9 (60.6)	12.6 (54.7)	10.4 (50.7)	14.3 (57.7)
Record low °C (°F)	2 (36)	1 (34)	1 (34)	1 (34)	5 (41)	5 (41)	0 (32)	1 (34)	2 (36)	5 (41)	1 (34)	−4 (25)	−4 (25)
Average precipitation mm (inches)	9.3 (0.37)	7.4 (0.29)	5.3 (0.21)	0.2 (0.01)	0.1 (0.00)	4.8 (0.19)	61.1 (2.41)	124.3 (4.89)	163.1 (6.42)	32.6 (1.28)	9.6 (0.38)	3.1 (0.12)	420.9 (16.57)
Average rainy days	1.3	0.8	0.7	0.3	0.1	0.7	4.6	7.1	6.5	2.1	1.2	0.6	26.0
Source: Servicio Meteorológico Nacional
