= Battle of Mulegé =

- Part of Mexican–American War
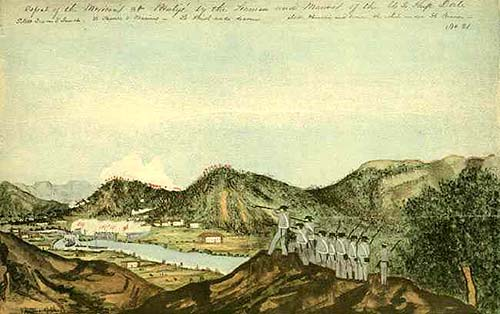
- American forces after capturing the hill at Mulege.
Date	2 October 1847
Location	Mulegé, Baja California Sur
Result	Mexican victory

Belligerents
United States	Mexico

Commanders and leaders
Thomas O. Selfridge; Tunis Craven	(Mexico) Manuel Pineda Muñoz

Strength
17 marines 54 seaman Dale	100 militia

Casualties and losses
2 wounded	None

The Battle of Mulegé was an American attack on Mulegé, Baja California Sur, during the Mexican–American War. On 2 October 1847, United States Marines and sailors fought with Mexican militia.

== Background ==
On August 10, 1847, United States Navy Commodore William Shubrick had resumed command of the Pacific Squadron. His first orders upon retaking command was the sending of sloops-of-war USS Dale and USS Portsmouth along with the frigate Congress to commence a new blockade of Mazatlán, Guaymas and San Blas.

When the Dale arrived alone at La Paz in mid-September, the commander of the U.S. occupation force there, Lieutenant Colonel Henry S. Burton, persuaded the Dale's commander, Thomas O. Selfridge, to sail for Loreto and Mulegé to prevent the landing of supplies from Guaymas and to secure a pledge of neutrality from the Mexican inhabitants.

On September 30, the Dale entered the port of Mulegé under British colors. After Dale was anchored, it lowered the British flag and raised the Stars and Stripes. Lieutenant Tunis Augustus Macdonough Craven of Dale, went ashore under a flag of truce and delivered to the Mexican emissary, Sub-Lt. Jesus Avilez, a message that Californias was American territory, which prompted Avilez's request for time to consider. Craven then seized the Mexican Navy schooner Magdalena, which had brought Capt. Manuel Pineda days before from Guaymas.

On October 1, Commander Selfridge sent a letter ashore warning the Mexican authorities to lay down their arms, to preserve neutrality and to abstain from contact with the mainland within three hours. Returning again after three hours, Craven received Pineda's refusal of the ultimatum. Returning again the next morning, Craven received Pineda's written rejection, Captain Manuel Pineda Muñoz stating that he refused to be neutral and is in protest against the Dale's use of British flag to enter the port.

== Battle ==
Pineda's defiance did not go unanswered. At 2 PM on 2 Oct. 1847, Lieutenant Craven with seventeen marines and fifty-seven sailors landed at the entrance to Muleje Creek (El Sombrerito) and proceeded up the right bank. Just after landing, USS Dale began her bombardment which reportedly had little effect.

Now on shore, the American marines and sailors proceeded to a nearby hill, occupied by a strong Mexican force commanding the town. Before reaching the hill, however, a shot was fired from a window of a nearby house and from a thicket to the Americans' left.

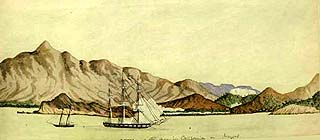
USS Dale bombarding Mulege during the engagement, a small captured schooner is also depicted.

Immediately, Craven dispatched a small force to attack and burn the house while he attacked the thicket. The house was burned and Lieutenant Craven encountered no one in the thicket or additional houses.

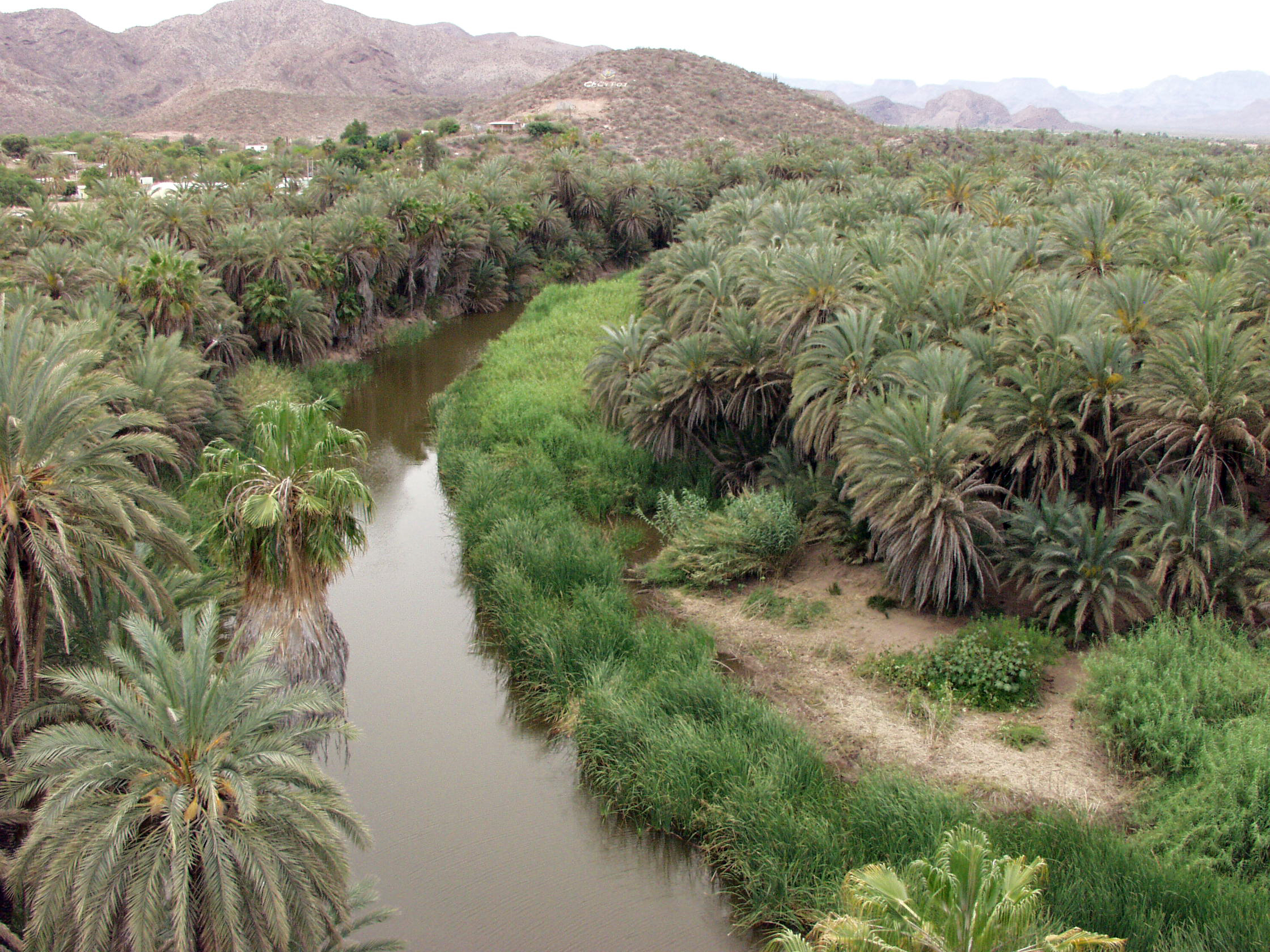
The creek at Mulege.

The Americans took the hill, the Mexicans retreating beyond the stream, and from several ambuscades, fired upon the Americans' left flank. The American forces responded with several volleys of return fire which forced the Mexicans to flee up the creek. Marching to the village at the foot of the hill, they found it deserted before proceeding to the River Road. Lieutenant Craven's men were again attacked by Mexican insurgents firing from the jungle on the opposite bank, but his fire along with The Boat Gun, drove them off. The farthest Craven took his force was three miles from the mouth of the river.

With the approach of night, Craven then proceeded to take his men back aboard the Dale.

== Aftermath ==
Craven thought he had inflicted "Chastisement", while Manuel Pineda reported "the enemy made off shamefully ... having inflicted exemplary punishment."

After the battle at Mulegé, the Dale sailed for La Paz, with the Magdalena in tow, reaching it on 8 Oct.

Commander Selfridge chartered a small schooner from an American citizen living at La Paz, christened it Libertad, and armed it with a 9-pounder on a pivot. Assigned to Lt. Craven, his mission was to sever communication between Mulege and Guaymas. On 2 Nov., Craven captured the sloop Alerta, before heading to Guaymas on 19 Nov.
