= Santa Anita, Baja California Sur =

Coordinates: 23°10′41″N 109°42′05″W

Santa Anita
- Village
- Interactive map of Santa Anita
- Country: Mexico
- State: Baja California Sur
- Municipality: Los Cabos

Area
  - Total: 3.8 km^{2} (1.5 sq mi)

Population (2010)
  - Total: 687
  - Density: 180/km^{2} (470/sq mi)

Santa Anita is a village in Los Cabos Municipality, Baja California Sur, western Mexico. It is located north of San Jose del Cabo on the right bank of the Arroyo San José along Federal Highway 1. It had a population of 687 inhabitants in the 2010 census, and is situated at an elevation of 76 meters (249 ft.) above sea level.

In 1968, it was described as a "little farming village". It is the type locality of the rice rat Oryzomys peninsulae, now possibly extinct.

== History ==
During the Mexican American War, on February 15, 1847, a council meeting at Santa Anita, after the flag of the United States was raised over San Jose del Cabo by forces of the U. S. Navy, declared Governor Francisco Palacios Miranda a traitor and named Maurico Castro Cota, of San Jose del Cabo, as his successor. Castro then attempted to raise the first company of volunteers to resist the Americans.

== Literature cited ==
- Carleton, M.D. and Arroyo-Cabrales, J. 2009. Review of the Oryzomys couesi complex (Rodentia: Cricetidae: Sigmodontinae) in Western Mexico. Bulletin of the American Museum of Natural History 331:94–127.
- Weber, F.J. 1968. The missions & missionaries of Baja California: an historical perspective. Baja California travels series, vol. 11. Dawson's Book Shop, 92 pp.
