= Francisco Palacios Miranda =

19th-century governor and comandante principal of Baja California Sur

Francisco Palacios Miranda was the Governor and Military Commandant of the Baja California Territory from 1844 to 1847. He is known for his cooperation with the Americans during the Mexican American War, accepting neutrality of his Territory in 1846 and making the abject surrender of La Paz to the Americans in 1847. For this he was declared a traitor and forced into exile at the end of the war.

On August 17, 1846, Commodore of the Pacific Squadron, Robert F. Stockton proclaimed: "...having by right of conquest taken possession of that territory known by the name of Upper and Lower California do now declare it to be a territory of the United States under the name of the Territory of California." Holding only part of Alta California and no part of the Territory of Baja California, Stockton was overstating the facts in the extreme. To carry out his intent to blockade the West coast of Mexico and to in fact control Baja California, on August 19, Stockton ordered the blockade of San Blas and Mazatlán. While stopping at La Paz, on the southeast corner of Baja California, and San José del Cabo, at the southern tip of the peninsula, Commander Samuel F. Du Pont, commander of the second-class sloop-of-war Cyane secured a promise of neutrality from Colonel Miranda. This allowed the American Navy to seize ships in the ports and get water and provisions there to support their blockade of the other Mexican ports on the west coast of the mainland.

Receiving this report of weakness from Du Pont, returning to San Francisco from the blockade in October, Stockton on February 2, 1847, ordered Commander John B. Montgomery on the first-class sloop-of-war Portsmouth to reestablish the blockade at Mazatlán and to raise the United States flag at San José del Cabo, La Paz, Pichilinque and Loreto. After reimposing a blockade at Mazatlán Montgomery sailed for Baja California. On April 14, Colonel Miranda surrendered La Paz and in effect all of Baja California to the Americans. A committee of residents soon afterward signed articles of capitulation which granted them United States citizen rights and the retention of their own officials and laws, as had been offered by the Americans before in Alta California.

However, as in Alta California, patriotic bajacalifornios were not ready to quietly surrender. On February 15, a council meeting of resistors at Santa Anita, north of San José del Cabo, declared Miranda a traitor and named Mauricio Castro Cota, of San José del Cabo, as his successor.

On November 16, 1847, Mexican forces under Manuel Pineda, made a sudden assault on the U.S. Army garrison at La Paz but failed to take the town. However, as they withdrew on the 17th, they burned ex-Governor Miranda's town house. At the end of the Mexican American War, in early August, 1848 the 1st Regiment of New York Volunteers occupying Baja California were ordered to return to Alta California to be discharged. They were accompanied by over 130 refugees from La Paz and 350 from San José. Among the refugees was ex-governor Francisco Palacios Miranda, forced to abandon his lands and property.
