= Siege of La Paz =

- Part of the Pacific Coast Campaign
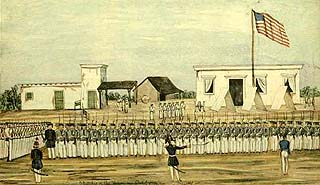
- Marines raising the American flag over La Paz, Mexico, 1847.
Date	November 27 – December 8, 1847
Location	La Paz, Baja California Sur 24°08′32″N 110°18′39″W
Result	American victory

Belligerents
United States	Mexico

Commanders and leaders
Henry S. Burton	Manuel Pineda Muñoz

Strength
115 infantry	~500 militia

Casualties and losses
1 wounded	~36 killed 60 deserted

The siege of La Paz was a Mexican siege of their city of La Paz in Baja California Sur. Mexican militia forces attempted to destroy the United States Army garrison, occupying the peninsular town. The siege occurred over twelve days in November and December 1847, at the end of the Mexican–American War.

== Background ==
Captain Manuel Pineda Muñoz of the Mexican Army had been drafting Mexican peasants to serve in his campaign on the western coast of Mexico. After his militia army was defeated twice (at the Battle of La Paz and the Battle of San José del Cabo), Captain Pineda decided to continue the campaign with a prolonged engagement at La Paz, hoping to finish what he failed to do at the first battle.

The American garrison at this time included 115 men of the New York Volunteers, a volunteer force from New York and was commanded by Lieutenant Colonel Henry S. Burton when they landed peacefully in La Paz on July 21.

The United States Navy had no warships to help protect La Paz; they all sailed north to Alta California for orders. The others had left Mexican waters for supplies. As such, this left the American garrison with no ability to evacuate La Paz, should it become necessary.

== Siege ==
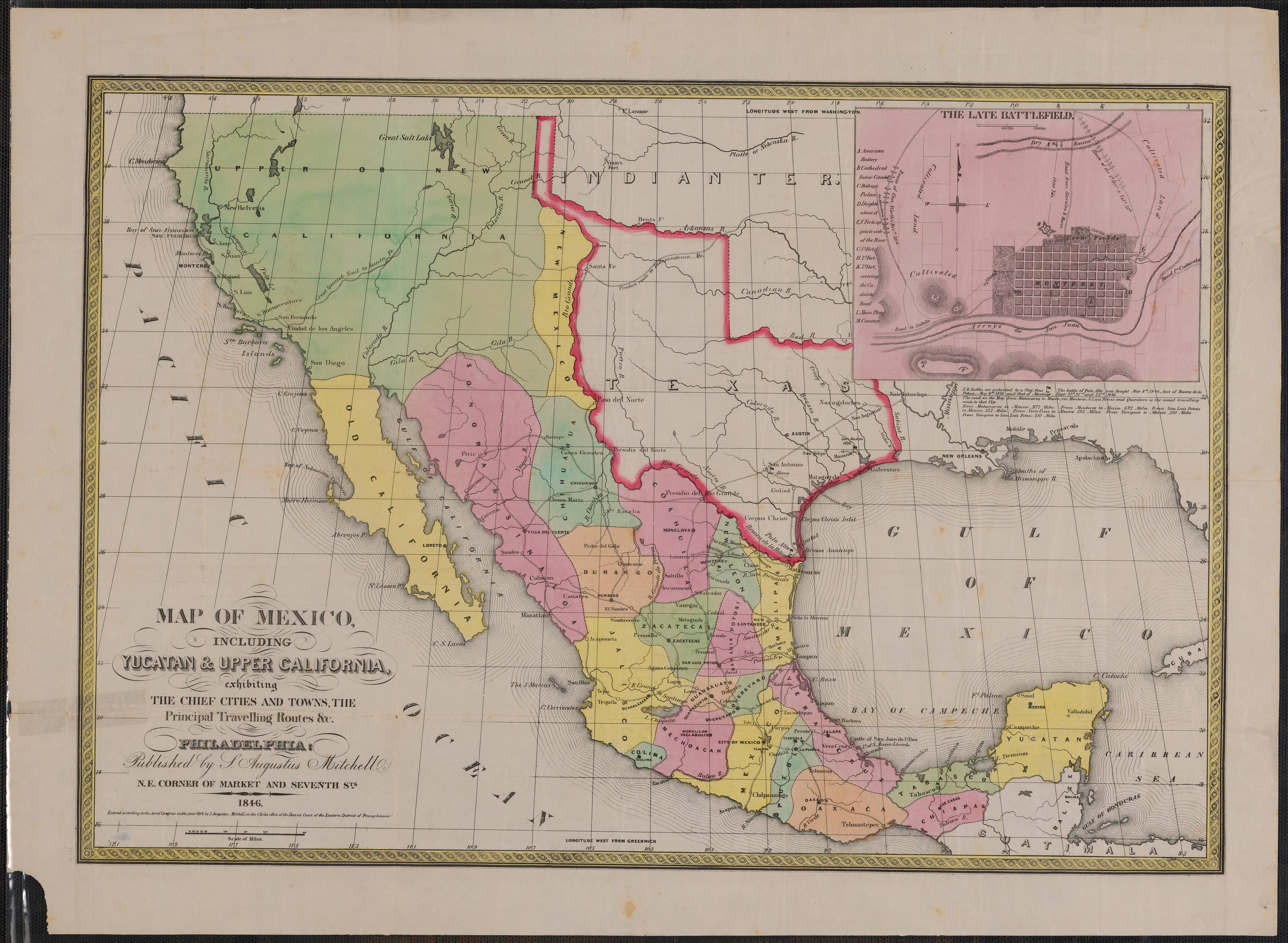
An 1847 map of Mexico, La Paz is located near the tip of the Baja California Peninsula.

Pineda's force, increased to about 500 men by a party from San Jose bringing a 4-pounder, attacked on November 21 from 3 pm to 8 pm. Several times Pineda's men advanced from the east and south but were driven back. Pineda's men occupied the old Mexican barracks on November 28. They erected a Mexican flag, but Burton's men quickly retook the position.

On December 8, a launch, arrived from Mazatlán with supplies, as did the Cyane, when Pineda's men retired to San Antonio.

== Aftermath ==
Pineda's campaign was not over yet, though; he would move on to besiege San José del Cabo in the following days.

Lieutenant Tunis Craven described the appearance of the ruined town later on in a report: "All of that part of the town not protected by the garrison's muskets was burned, the vine and fig tree, as well as the graceful palm-all being devoured. Such are the beauties of war."

While the Mexicans were besieging La Paz, U.S. President James K. Polk, in his annual message to the Congress, on December 7, 1847, stated: "Early after the commencement of the war, New Mexico and the Californias were taken possession by our forces. Our military and naval commanders were ordered to conquer and to hold them, subject to be disposed of by a treaty of peace. These Provinces are now in our undisputed occupation and have been so for many months, all resistance on the part of Mexico having ceased within their limits. ... I am satisfied that they should never be surrendered to Mexico."
