= Bombardment of Guaymas =

- Part of the Mexican–American War
Date	October 20, 1847
Location	Guaymas, Sonora, Mexico, Gulf of California
Result	United States victory: Mexican garrison evacuated Guaymas.

Belligerents
United States	Mexico

Commanders and leaders
Captain Elie A. F. La Vallette	(Mexico) Col. Antonio Campuzano

Strength
1 first-class frigate USS Congress sloop USS Portsmouth	1 coastal fortress, shore batteries

Casualties and losses
None	None known

On October 20, 1847 Captain Elie A. F. La Vallette of the first-class frigate USS Congress in company with the sloop USS Portsmouth forced the Mexican garrison of Guaymas to evacuate the city under the threat of bombardment, then dismantled the seaward defenses of the city and thereafter controlled the city by the threat of bombardment by a sloop of war kept on station at the mouth of the harbor.

Threat of bombardment of the fort and city of Guaymas by the two ships under Captain Elie A. F. La Vallette led to secret evacuation of the Mexican garrison and artillery at night by Col. Antonio Campuzano. Following the bombardment of the fort and city in the morning, La Vallette landed to take possession, to find the city abandoned by its defenders and most its population. With insufficient force to occupy the city, La Vallette demolished the seaward defenses of the port and left the sloop USS Portsmouth offshore to dominate the port with its guns, and collect the tariff, tonnage and ad valorem duties from ships entering the port.

== See also ==
- Pacific Coast Campaign
