= Henry Stanton Burton =

American general (1818-1869)

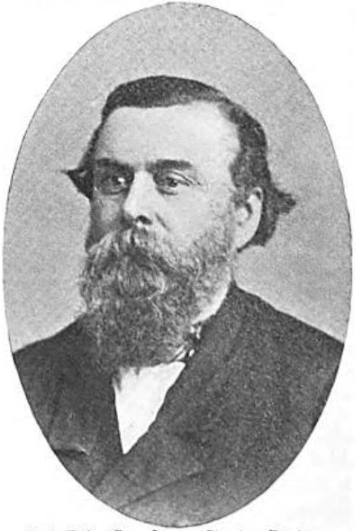
- Born: September 1818; West Point, New York, U.S.
- Died: April 4, 1869 (aged 50); Fort Adams, Newport, Rhode Island, U.S.
- Burial place: West Point, New York, U.S.
- Spouse: María Amparo Ruiz (m. 1849)
- Military career
- Allegiance: United States
- Branch: United States Army; Union Army
- Service years: 1839–1869
- Rank: Colonel; Brevet Brigadier General
- Units: 3rd U.S. Artillery Regiment; 1st Regiment of New York Volunteers
- Commands: Fort Delaware; 5th U.S. Artillery Regiment; Artillery Reserve, Army of the Potomac
- Conflicts: Second Seminole War; Mexican–American War; Pacific Coast Campaign; Battle of La Paz; Siege of La Paz; Skirmish of Todos Santos; American Civil War; Siege of Petersburg

Henry Stanton Burton (1818–1869) was a graduate of West Point, a career American Army officer who served in the Second Seminole War, Mexican–American War and the American Civil War.

== Early life ==
Henry Stanton Burton was born in September 1818 at West Point, New York, where his father was employed as a sutler. He studied at Norwich University from 1832 to 1835 before being appointed to the United States Military Academy at West Point from Vermont in 1835. Burton graduated on July 1, 1839, and was appointed 2nd Lieutenant, 3rd U.S. Artillery Regiment. From 1839 to 1842, he served in the Florida Indian War and on November 11, 1839, was promoted 1st lieutenant. From 1843 to 1846 he was assistant instructor of infantry and artillery tactics at West Point.

== Mexican War and duty in California ==
During the Mexican–American War he became lieutenant colonel of U.S. Volunteers and served as second in command of the 1st Regiment of New York Volunteers. Accepted by the U.S. Army in August 1846, the regiment was transported around Cape Horn to California where it served as garrisons. Elements of the Volunteers under Lt Colonel Burton were involved in operations of the Pacific Coast Campaign in Baja California, fighting in the Battle of La Paz, Siege of La Paz and in the final defeat of the Mexican forces at the Skirmish of Todos Santos. His command remained as a garrison in Baja California until the peace treaty returned it to Mexico.

As the war drew to a close, it appeared that Baja California would remain a Mexican state, while Alta California would become territory of the United States. Burton offered to help residents of Baja California move to Alta California and become United States citizens. Burton returned to Monterey with his command and the evacuated Mexicans. On July 9, 1849, he married one of the refugees, Maria Amparo Ruiz at Monterey. After his Volunteer regiment disbanded in October 1848, Burton, unlike most of them who rushed to the gold fields, returned to his regular army service; having been promoted to Captain on September 22, 1847.

In December 1851, he served as a judge on the courts martial of George H. Derby, the famous humorist, and Joseph Hooker, the assistant adjutant general of the Pacific Division in Sonoma, California.

In 1852, he bought Rancho Jamul near San Diego and homesteaded it on March 3, 1854. In 1855, he went to San Diego, to serve as commander of the Post at Mission San Diego de Alcalá where he first established Camp Burton, as a temporary position before occupying permanent quarters in the abandoned Mission San Diego de Alcalá. While there he was living at Rancho Jamul with his family.

== Civil War ==
Captain Burton remained in California on duty in various forts until 1862, when, having been promoted to major on May 14, 1861, the American Civil War began. He was ordered to Delaware, where he commanded Fort Delaware military prison until 1863. On July 25, 1863, he was promoted lieutenant colonel, 4th U.S. Artillery Regiment. On August 11, 1863, he was promoted colonel, 5th U.S. Artillery Regiment; and commanded the Artillery Reserve of the Army of the Potomac from 1863 to 1864. He was inspector of artillery in the Richmond Campaign in the Department of the East. From 1864 he was a member of the retiring board. On March 13, 1865, he was promoted brevet brigadier general U. S. Army, for the capture of Petersburg, Virginia.

== Later life ==
Following the Civil War, Burton subsequently commanded the 5th U.S. Artillery Regiment at Fort Monroe, Virginia, at Columbia, South Carolina, at Richmond, Virginia, and at Fort Adams, Rhode Island. From October 1868 to March 1869 he was on court martial duty at New York City. He died April 4, 1869, at Fort Adams, in Newport, Rhode Island, and was buried at West Point.
