= Gabriel Gonzalez Pereyra =

Dominican priest (1789–1868)

Gabriel Gonzalez Pereyra (1789-1868), Dominican priest, Bajacalifornio guerrilla in the Mexican–American War.
