= Manuel Pineda Muñoz =

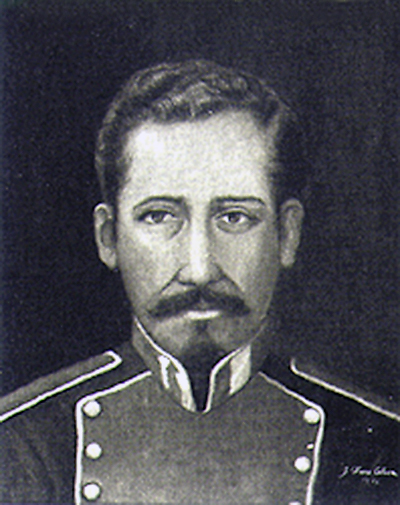
Captain Manuel Pineda Muñoz

Manuel Pineda Muñoz (1804–1891), was a Mexican Army officer that led the Mexican resistance against the forces of the United States in Baja California Sur, during the Mexican–American War. Victor of the Battle of Mulegé, he inspired the resistance force of Bajacalifornios to attack and then besiege La Paz and attack San José del Cabo. Although he was eventually defeated and later captured at San Antonio de la Sierra, the protracted resistance he led made the American hold on the Baja California peninsula unsecure, and prompted American statesmen to omit in the final peace treaty, their original demand for the annexation of Baja California and Baja California Sur.
