= San Antonio, Baja California Sur =

Town in Baja California Sur, Mexico

Coordinates: 23°48′29″N 110°03′25″W

San Antonio is a small town in La Paz Municipality in the Mexican state of Baja California Sur, located near El Triunfo on Federal Highway 1. It had a population of 463 inhabitants in the 2010 census and is situated 400 meters (1,300 ft) above sea level.

== History ==
Spanish conquistador Hernán Cortés visited the existing port of La Paz with the ships St. Lazarus, Santa Agueda and St. Thomas in 1535. Cortés named it Bay St. Croix. Years later, Admiral Sebastián Vizcaíno attempted to set up a settlement in Baja California in 1596, near the current capital city of La Paz. In 1616 a group of Dutch pirates known as "Pichilingues" anchored the boats Great Sun and Full Moon in a bay near La Paz that currently carries the same name.

Isidro de Atondo and Antillon took possession of the port of La Paz in 1683, and on behalf of King Charles II of Spain, designated it the Port of Our Lady of La Paz. In 1720, Mission La Paz was founded by the Jesuit fathers Juan Ugarte and Jaime Bravo. The capital of the Californias was transferred to La Paz in 1830, under the colonial overlord Colonel Manuel Victorio.

In 1847, during the Mexican–American War, the ships Stockton, Shubreick, and Jhones attacked the port of La Paz without encountering resistance. Territorial Governor Francisco Palacios Miranda surrendered La Paz to the U.S. Army in the same year. In 1853, the filibuster William Walker, in his boat Carolina, surprised the garrison paceña with the chief political prisoner and took possession of government offices, establishing what he called the "Republic of the Two Stars". In 1853, faced with the threat of troops led by Lieutenant Colonel Manuel Marquez de Leon, Walker fled La Paz.

In the year 1912, Vice President Pino Suarez visited La Paz and was received with sympathy.

=== Modern ===
With the relocation of the Free Municipality in 1972, in the area of the city of La Paz, is installed the first municipal council.

In 1975, approving the conversion of the then state Territory of Baja California Sur, the city of La Paz was left as the municipality and the state capital simultaneously.

Since the arrival of the Spaniards to the area currently occupied by the municipality of La Paz, its inhabitants were subjected to a radical change, primarily in their economic, political, and social lives. They have fought against their neighbors in civil wars and other military conflicts. However, the municipality has managed to overcome these situations, becoming now the main point of Baja California Sur, as it is the headquarters of the Executive, Legislative and Judicial Branches.

The development of La Paz reflects the economic growth of the region, in which the activities occupy a prominent place as a factor of paramount importance in the economic progress of the town in particular and the state in general, as well as being the gateway to the ancient ruins of the Guaycuras.

== Shield ==
The stylized eagle represents Mexico, and represents Mexico's historical footprint on the history and economic potential of the municipality of La Paz. The sword and the cross represent the Conquest and the evangelization of the region. The framework that surrounds the golden eagle's claws and silver inner frame symbolize wealth from the mines of this municipality, where reserves are held by the state in terms of the future of Mexico. The blue stripe on the side with fish symbolize the vast coastal area of the municipality with an abundance of diverse species of fish, crustaceans, mollusks and other shellfish.

The symbol is split into two rectangles. On the left, by the year 1535, the date of discovery of the territory in the city of La Paz, and on the right, the year 1697, when the Spanish launched evangelism in California. The skull of the conquest was lost over time. In the center, uniting these dates, is a sun that symbolizes the historical past. In the bottom half of the shield says 1978, the date in which the city was refurbished.

The sun symbolizes the progress that La Paz has made. Its motto,: "Peace and Progress", is present, with the Latin words "Coellum, Aqua et Tellusque Valde Bona," in the sun rays. The largest rays illuminate east of four valuable pearls symbolizing the cities La Paz, San Antonio, San Jose and All Saints.
