= Olompali =

Olompali may refer to:

- Battle of Olompali
- Olompali, California
- Olompali State Historic Park
- Rancho Olompali
