= Camilo Ynitia =

Miwok leader (c. 1803 – c. 1856)

Camilo Ynitia (Hueñux)
- Born: c. 1803; Marin County, California, USA
- Died: c. 1856; Marin County, California, USA
- Occupations: Farmer, rancher
- Spouse(s): Elena, Candida, Cayetana, Susanna Maria
- Children: Juan Pablo, Maxima Antonia, Maria Antonia
- Parent(s): Aurelio (Inutia), Aurelia (Mineru)

Camilo Ynitia (alternative spelling "Camillo"; original native name transliterated as "Hueñux") was born in about 1803, in Marin County, southern Marin, of the Huiman tribe near Sausalito. The family likely traveled up to Olompali, where his father had built an adobe brick home. Camilo was a leader of the Coast Miwok. Camilo was known as the last Hoipu (headman) of the Miwok community living at Olompali and the Coast Miwoks of the Southern Marin Band. Camilo was also the only Native American on the northern frontier of Alta California to secure and keep a large Mexican-era land grant: In 1843 Governor Manuel Micheltorena of Alta California deeded him the Rancho Olompali, a large tract of land that is between present-day Novato and Petaluma, California. A part of this land now comprises the Olompali State Historic Park.

== Parents and Childhood ==
Camilo was born to Aurelio (Inutia) and Aurelia (Mineru) about 1803 and baptized under the Spanish name Camilo on 9 January 1819 in the chapel at the Mission San Rafael Arcángel, according to his baptismal record. His surname was the Spanish transliteration of his father's original native name. Aurelio Inutia was Hoipu (headman) of the Caminpuxcui rancheria according to mission records. Aurelio Inutia was a chief of the Huimen tribe. This Coast Miwok tribe inhabited much of today's Marin County, California.

In 1775 the Presidio of San Francisco sent an exploring party into the north bay country and Camilo's father, chief at Olompali, made them welcome. Camilo's father also built the very first adobe home north of the San Francisco Bay at Olompali. The name "Olompali" comes from the Coast Miwok language and likely means "southern village" or "southern people." (It was also spelled "Olompolli" or "Olompoli"). Historians think that the natives that built the house had learned how to make adobe bricks at the Mission San Francisco. Camilo inherited this original home and built another adobe nearby for himself. His birthplace was in "a sheltered valley, with an abundance of game", adjacent to the salt water Bay, with abundant mollusks and fish.

== Adult life ==
In 1835, the Mexican government sent General Mariano Guadalupe Vallejo into the Marin and Sonoma Counties, in order to bring military control in the region from the presidio in Sonoma, California. According to the book Historica de California Vallejo's first day arriving north of the Bay in June 1835 is probably his first meeting with Camilo Ynitia and the people of Olompali: General Vallejo recounts sailing into the North Bay, and first stopping in San Rafael, to form an alliance with a Coast Miwok tribe there, before moving towards Sonoma County to gather all tribes and arrange as many alliances as possible among all tribes.

In 1836, Camillo and Vallejo signed a peace treaty, aligning the Olompali people with the Mexican-Americans.

In 1843, because of this treaty with Vallejo and the Mexican-Americans, Camilo was one of the two Native Americans to be deeded a large grant from the Mexican-American Government. (The other native to receive a land grant was Vallejo's close friend, the Suisunes Chief Solano.) With Vallejo's aid, Camilo petitioned the Mexican Governor for land for his people and received the Rancho Olompali grant, which included Olompali and his birthplace home. This land grant was confirmed by the American government after control of California was transferred to the United States. The land grant was recorded in California state records, as follows:

"Olompali #48, Marin Co., Grant of 2 sq. leagues made in 1843 by Gov. Micheltorena to Camillo Unitia [sic]. Patent for 8,877.48 acres (35.9259 km^{2}) issued in 1862 to Camilo Unitia [sic] in T 3-4N, R 6-7W, MDM."

— California Ranchos: Patented Private Land Grants Listed by County, Shumway 1988:39

Camilo built his own home partly with the bricks his father had used earlier. The adobe home as adapted by Camilo had walls 32 inches (810 mm) thick, and ceilings 8 feet (2.4 m) high. He owned 600 cattle, and was a notable breeder who owned numerous horses and sheep. He raised wheat and some think sold it to the Russians at Fort Ross.

=== Battle of Olompali ===
At the time of the Californian revolution known as the Bear Flag Revolt, on 24 June 1846 the Battle of Olompali occurred when a violent skirmish broke out at Camilo's adobe between a troop of American Bear Flaggers from Sonoma and a Mexican force of 50 from Monterey, under the command of Joaquín de la Torre. Several men were wounded and one man was reportedly killed, the only fatality associated with the brief California revolution.

=== Final years ===
Camilo eventually had to sell most of Rancho Olompali to James Black on 13 August 1852 for $5,200, but retained 1,480 acres (6.0 km^{2}) called Apalacocha. He died in 1856, either abruptly or of a short illness.

=== Family ===
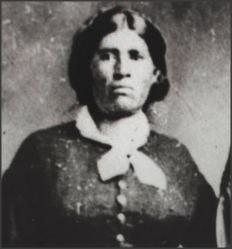
Maxima Antonia Ynita, circa 1865

Camilo married four times. He married his first wife Elena 22 October 1822; she died in April 1830. He next married Candida on 22 May 1831; she died 13 March 1835. He then married Cayetana on 13 July 1835. By Cayetana he had a son, Juan Pablo, and two daughters, Maxina Antonia and Maria Antonia. Juan Pablo was born in 1839; he died in a boating accident on 28 May 1851 along with the father of the man who would marry Maria Antonia. Maxima Antonia (known as Mary Maxima later in life) was born 18 November 1841, and was baptized on 5 December 1841. Maria Antonia was born in August 1845, and was baptized on 31 October 1845. Her godfather was William A. Richardson, the namesake of Richardson Bay. Cayetana died 21 November 1850, and Camilo married his fourth wife, Susanna Maria on 5 January 1852. Camilo also adopted another girl, who married John Pingston, a "free man of color". They had a son, Juan Jose Pingston. Camilo conveyed approximately 20 acres (81,000 m^{2}) in the extreme southwest corner of Apalacocha to John on 14 February 1853.

Camilo's daughter Maxima Antonia was married first to Henry Holden Bennett, an American, on 12 June 1854, likely with Camilo's encouragement. Then after Bennett's death in 1856, Maxima married Henry Harper Willard. Henry and Maxima had 13 children. After Henry's death in 1888, Maxima married Armstrong McCabe on 31 July 1891. Maria Antonia married Joseph Knox and had two children. After Camilo's death, Maxima and Maria purchased a part of Rancho Sanel in the Sanel Valley of Mendocino County, and moved there with their husbands and helped found the town of Sanel, later named Hopland. On 26 November 1860, "Being in want of money for a Maintenance," Maxima and Maria sold Apalacocha, to John Knight, their Mendocino attorney, for $3,693. With that transaction, the last of aboriginal Olompali passed into American ownership.

== Recognition and legends ==
The chief and his adobe house are legendary today. In 1915, Camilo's adobe house was owned by James and Josephine Burdell and they built a 26-room mansion around it. They used to take people on tours and show the home. Much of the original Rancho Olompali, along with the ruins of the original Camilo Ynitia adobe, is now protected within the Olompali State Historic Park.

William Heath, a contemporary, said that Camilo was "fine, intelligent and shrewd." Stephen Richardson called him "clean-cut, capable, and all around."

It is said that Camilo buried all his gold from his sale to James Black on a mountainside, because when he died he had very little money on record. One theory is his last wife or family knew where the gold was and unburied it later to assist them in purchasing cattle and part of Rancho Sanel in Mendocino County.

To this day scattered here and there, there are still those who can claim to be a direct descendant of Camilo Ynitia.

== Sources ==
- The Huntington Library, Early California Population Project Database, 2006.
- Lynch, Robert M. The Sonoma Valley Story. Sonoma, CA: Sonoma-Index Tribune, 1997. ISBN 0-9653857-0-1 (treaties 1836)
- Mason, Jack. Early Marin. Petaluma, CA: House of Printing, 1971.
- Seif, Dena (2006). University of California Irvine Camillo Ynitia, Coast Miwok (1803-1856) - Catholic, Rancho Grant Owner File retrieved 6 Apr. 2007.
- Shumway, Burgess M., California Ranchos: Patented Private Land Grants Listed by County. San Bernardino, CA: The Borgo Press, 1988. ISBN 0-89370-935-2
- Thomas, Robert C., Drake at Olompali printed by Apala Press 1979. ISBN 0-9602546-0-9
