= Battle of Olómpali =

Part of the Bear Flag Revolt in California (1846)

- Part of the Bear Flag Revolt; Conquest of California
Date	June 24, 1846
Location	Olómpali, Alta California, present-day California, US 38.152446°N 122.571170°W
Result	California Republic victory
Territorial changes	Alta California

Belligerents
California Republic	Mexico

Commanders and leaders
Henry L. Ford	(Mexico) Joaquín de la Torre

Strength
17–18 militia	50 infantry, 20 irregulars

Casualties and losses
1–2 killed, unknown wounded	1 killed, 2 wounded, 3–4 captured
- Location within present-day California

The Battle of Olómpali was fought on June 24, 1846, between a rebel group supporting an independent California Republic and a Mexican army force under the command of Joaquín de la Torre. It was the only battle of the Bear Flag Revolt. The encounter took place in present-day Marin County, California at a site that is now part of the Olompali State Historic Park.

== Background ==
The skirmish began when a detachment of General José Castro’s Alta California army forces from the Presidio of Monterey, under the command of Joaquín de la Torre, headed north in reaction to the declaration of an independent California Republic in Sonoma ten days earlier. Near Olómpali (north of present-day Novato) they met up with a militia group that had set out from Sonoma in hopes of rescuing two rebels who had been captured and, as they had learned the previous day, killed.

== Battle ==
During the Bear Flag Revolt, on June 24, 1846, the Battle of Olómpali occurred when a violent skirmish broke out between a group of American Bear Flaggers from Sonoma, led by Henry Ford, and a Mexican army force of 50 from Monterey, under the command of Joaquin de la Torre. The opposing forces met at Rancho Olompali, granted to Coast Miwok chief Camilo Ynitia in 1843.

On about June 16, William Todd was dispatched from Sonoma to Bodega Bay with an unnamed companion to obtain gunpowder from American settlers in that area. On June 18, Bears Thomas Cowie and George Fowler were sent to Rancho Sotoyome (near current-day Healdsburg, California) to pick up a cache of gunpowder from Moses Carson, brother of Frémont's scout Kit Carson.

On June 20 when the procurement parties failed to return as expected, Lieutenant Ford sent Sergeant Gibson with four men to Rancho Sotoyome. Gibson obtained the powder and on the way back fought with several Californians and captured one of them. From the prisoner they learned of the deaths of Cowie and Fowler. There are Californio and Oso versions of what had happened. Ford also learned that William Todd and his companion had been captured by the Californio irregulars led by Juan Padilla and José Ramón Carrillo.

Ford then rode toward Santa Rosa with seventeen to nineteen Bears. Not finding Padilla, the Bears headed toward one of his homes near Two Rock. The following morning the Bears captured three or four men near the Rancho Laguna de San Antonio and also found a corral of horses near the Indian rancho of Olúmpali, near the mouth of the Petaluma River, which they assumed belonged to Padilla's group. Ford approached the adobe but more men appeared and unexpectedly others came "pouring out of the adobe". Militiamen from south of the Bay, led by Mexican Captain Joaquin de la Torre, had joined with Padilla's irregulars and now numbered about seventy. Ford's men positioned themselves in a grove of trees and opened fire when the enemy charged on horseback, killing one and wounding another. During the ensuing long-range battle, William Todd and his companion escaped from the house where they were being held and ran to the Bears. The Alta California militia disengaged from the long-range fighting after suffering a few wounded and returned to San Rafael. An Alta California militiaman reported that their muskets could not shoot as far as the rifles used by some Bears. This was the only battle fought during the Bear Flag Revolt.
