= California Republic =

Unrecognized breakaway state from Mexico (1846)

Coordinates: 38°17′33″N 122°27′27″W

- June 14 – July 9, 1846
- The Bear Flag

- Mexico's Department of Alta California, of which a small area north of San Francisco was controlled by the Bear Flag rebels
- Status: Unrecognized state
- Capital: None
- Common languages: English; Spanish; Indigenous Californian languages
- Religion: Catholic; Latter-day Saints; Indigenous Californian religion
- Government: Republic
- Leader
  - 1846: William B. Ide
  - 1846: John C. Frémont
- History
  - Independence from Mexico declared: June 14, 1846
  - Occupation of Sonoma by the U.S. military: July 9, 1846

Population
  - 1846: 15,000
- Currency: United States dollar Mexican real
Preceded by	Succeeded by
Centralist Republic of Mexico; Department of the Californias	United States; Interim government of California
- Today part of: United States

The California Republic, commonly known as the Bear Flag Republic, was a short-lived unrecognized breakaway state from Mexico, that existed from June 14 to July 9, 1846. It militarily controlled an area north of San Francisco, in and around what is now Sonoma County in California.

In June 1846, 33 American immigrants in Alta California who had entered without official permission rebelled against the Mexican department's (Note: "Department" was a territorial and administrative designation used by Mexico's centralized government under the Seven Laws of 1836.) government. Among their grievances were that they hadn’t been allowed to buy or rent land and had been threatened with expulsion. Mexican officials had been concerned about a coming war with the United States and the growing influx of Americans into California. The rebellion was covertly encouraged by U.S. Army Brevet Captain John C. Frémont, and added to the troubles of the recent outbreak of the Mexican–American War.

The name "California Republic" appeared only on the flag the insurgents raised in Sonoma. It indicated their aspiration of forming a republican government under their control. The rebels elected military officers but no civil structure was ever established. Their flag, featuring a silhouette of a California grizzly bear, became known as the "Bear Flag" and was later the basis for the official state flag of California.

Three weeks later, on July 5, 1846, the Republic's military of 100 to 200 men was subsumed into the California Battalion commanded by Brevet Captain John C. Frémont. The Bear Flag Revolt and what remained of the California Republic ceased to exist on July 9 when U.S. Navy Lieutenant Joseph Revere raised the United States flag in front of the Sonoma Barracks and sent a second flag to be raised at Sutter's Fort.

== Background of the Bear Flag Revolt ==
=== Alta California's Governance ===
By 1845–46, Alta California had been largely neglected by Mexico for the twenty-five years since Mexican independence. It had evolved into a semi-autonomous region with open discussions among Californios about whether California should remain with Mexico; seek independence; or become annexed to the United Kingdom, France, or the United States. In 1845, the widely hated Manuel Micheltorena, the latest governor to be sent by Mexico, was forcefully ejected by the Californians. His forces were defeated at the Battle of Providencia (also known as the Second Battle of Cahuenga Pass) as a result of the actions of California pioneer John Marsh. This resulted in the return of Californian Pio Pico to the governorship. Pico ruled the region south of San Luis Obispo with his capital in The Town of Our Lady the Queen of Angels of the Porciúncula River, now known as Los Angeles. The area to the north of the pueblo of San Luis Obispo was under the control of Alta California's Commandante José Castro with headquarters near Monterey, the traditional capital and, significantly, the location of the Customhouse. Pico and Castro disliked each other personally and soon began escalating disputes over control of the Customhouse income.

Decrees issued by the central government in Mexico City were often acknowledged and supported with proclamations but ignored in practice. By the end of 1845, when rumors of a military force being sent from Mexico proved to be false, rulings by the other district government were mostly ignored.

=== Texas, immigration and land ===
The relationship between the United States and Mexico had been deteriorating for some time. The Republic of Texas, which Mexico still considered to be its territory, had been admitted to statehood in 1845. Mexico had earlier threatened war if this happened. James K. Polk was elected President of the United States in 1844, and considered his election a mandate for his expansionist policies.

Mexican law had long allowed grants of land to naturalized Mexican citizens. Obtaining Mexican citizenship was not difficult and many earlier American immigrants had gone through the process and obtained free grants of land. That same year (1845), anticipation of war with the United States and the increasing number of immigrants reportedly coming from the United States resulted in orders from Mexico City denying immigrants from the United States entry into California. The orders also required California's officials not to allow land grants, sales or even rental of land to non-citizen emigrants already in California. All non-citizen immigrants, who had arrived without permission, were threatened with being forced out of California.

Alta California's Sub-Prefect Francisco Guerrero had written to U.S. Consul Thomas O. Larkin that:

a multitude of foreigners [having] come into California and bought fixed property [land], a right of naturalized foreigners only, he was under the necessity of notifying the authorities in each town to inform such purchasers that the transactions were invalid and they themselves subject to be expelled whenever the government might find it convenient.

During November 1845, California's Commandante General José Castro met with representatives of the 1845 American immigrants at Sonoma and Sutter's Fort. In his decree dated November 6 he wrote: "Therefore conciliating my duty [to enforce the orders from Mexico] with of the sentiment of hospitality which distinguishes the Mexicans, and considering that most of said expedition is composed of families and industrious people, I have deemed it best to permit them, provisionally, to remain in the department" with the conditions that they obey all laws, apply within three months for a license to settle, and promise to depart if that license was not granted.

Key figures
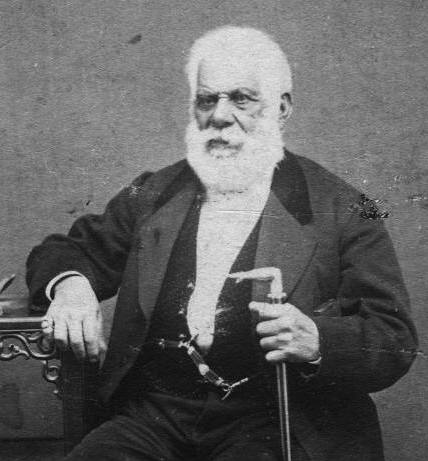
Pío Pico, the last Mexican Governor of Alta California

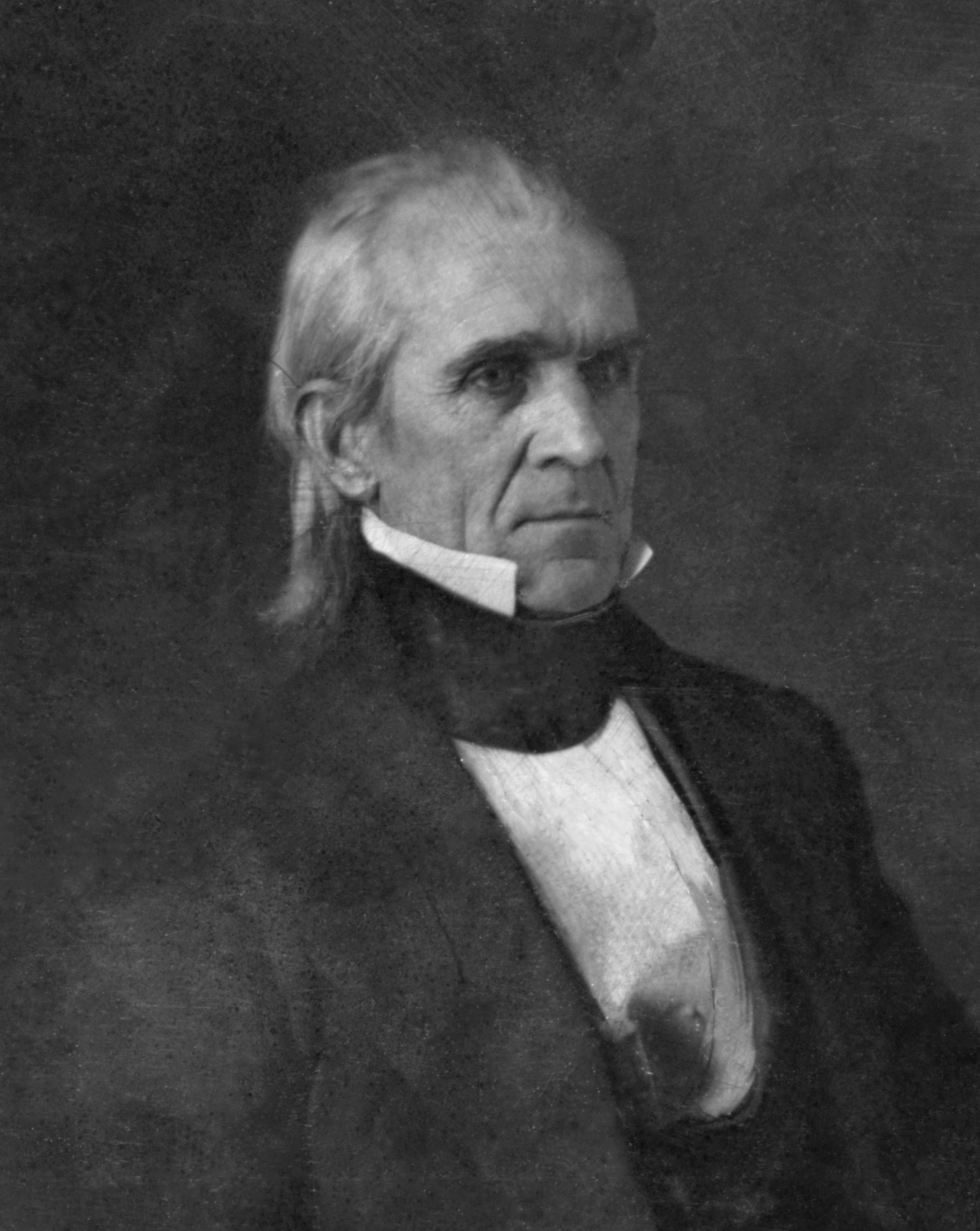
President James K. Polk favored annexation of California

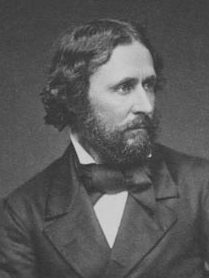
U.S. Army captain John C. Frémont encouraged the revolt

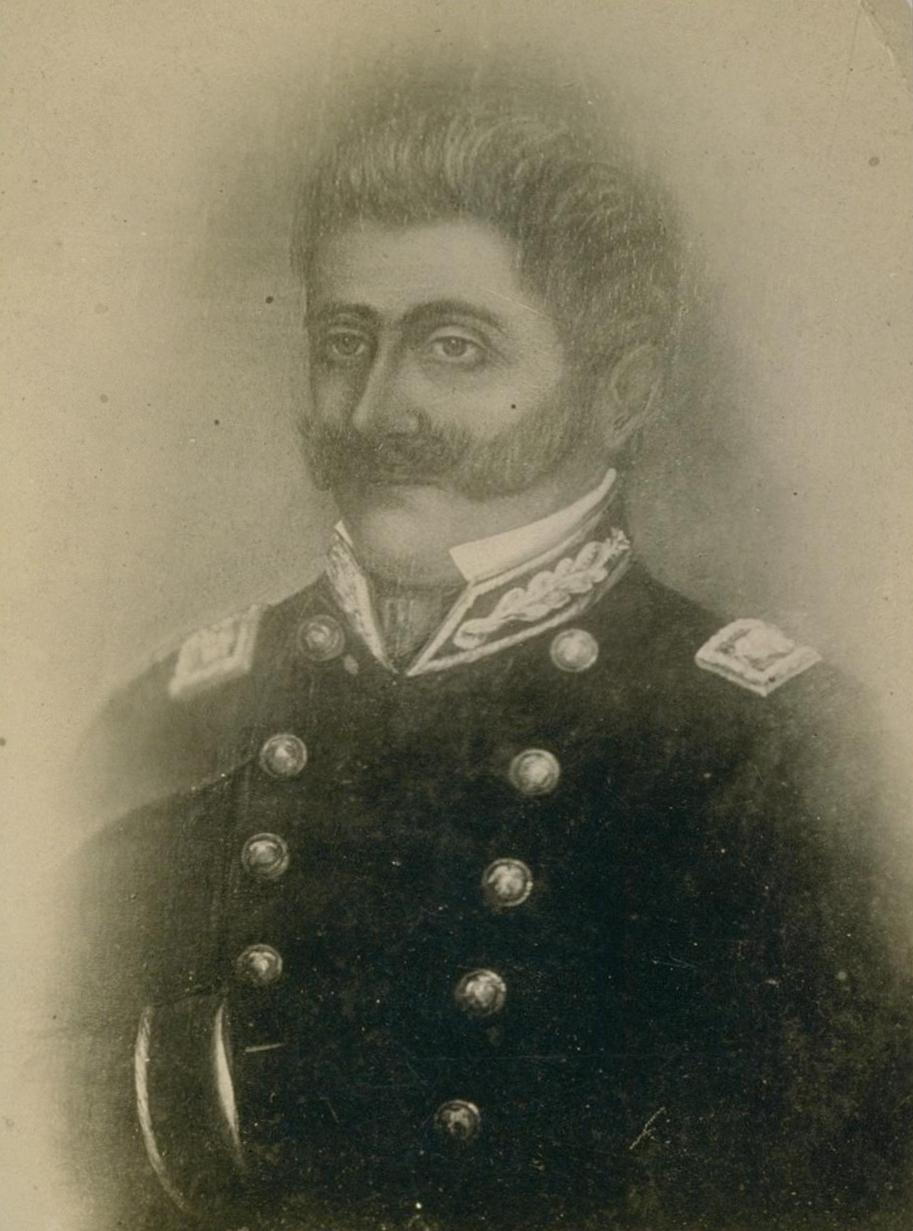
José Castro commanded the Mexican military forces in Alta California

=== Captain Frémont in California ===
A 62-man exploring and mapping expedition entered California in late 1845 under the command of U.S. Army Brevet Captain John C. Frémont. Frémont was well known in the United States as an author and explorer. He was also the son-in-law of expansionist U.S. Senator Thomas Hart Benton. Early in 1846 Frémont acted provocatively with California's Commandante General José Castro near the pueblo of Monterey and then moved his group out of California into Oregon Country. He was followed into Oregon by U.S. Marine Lt Archibald H. Gillespie who had been sent from Washington with a secret message to U.S. Consul Thomas O. Larkin and instructions to share the message with Frémont. Gillespie also brought a packet of letters from Frémont's wife and father-in-law.

Frémont's thoughts (as related in his book, written forty years later) after reading the message and letters were: "I saw the way opening clear before me. War with Mexico was inevitable; and a grand opportunity presented itself to realize in their fullest extent the far-sighted views of Senator Benton. I resolved to move forward on the opportunity and return forthwith to the Sacramento Valley in order to bring to bear all the influence I could command." Nevertheless, Frémont needed to be circumspect. As a military officer he could face court-martial for violating the Neutrality Act of 1794 that made it illegal for an American to wage war against another country at peace with the United States. The next morning Gillespie and Frémont's group departed for California. Frémont returned to the Sacramento Valley and set up camp near Sutter Buttes.

=== USS Portsmouth in the San Francisco Bay ===
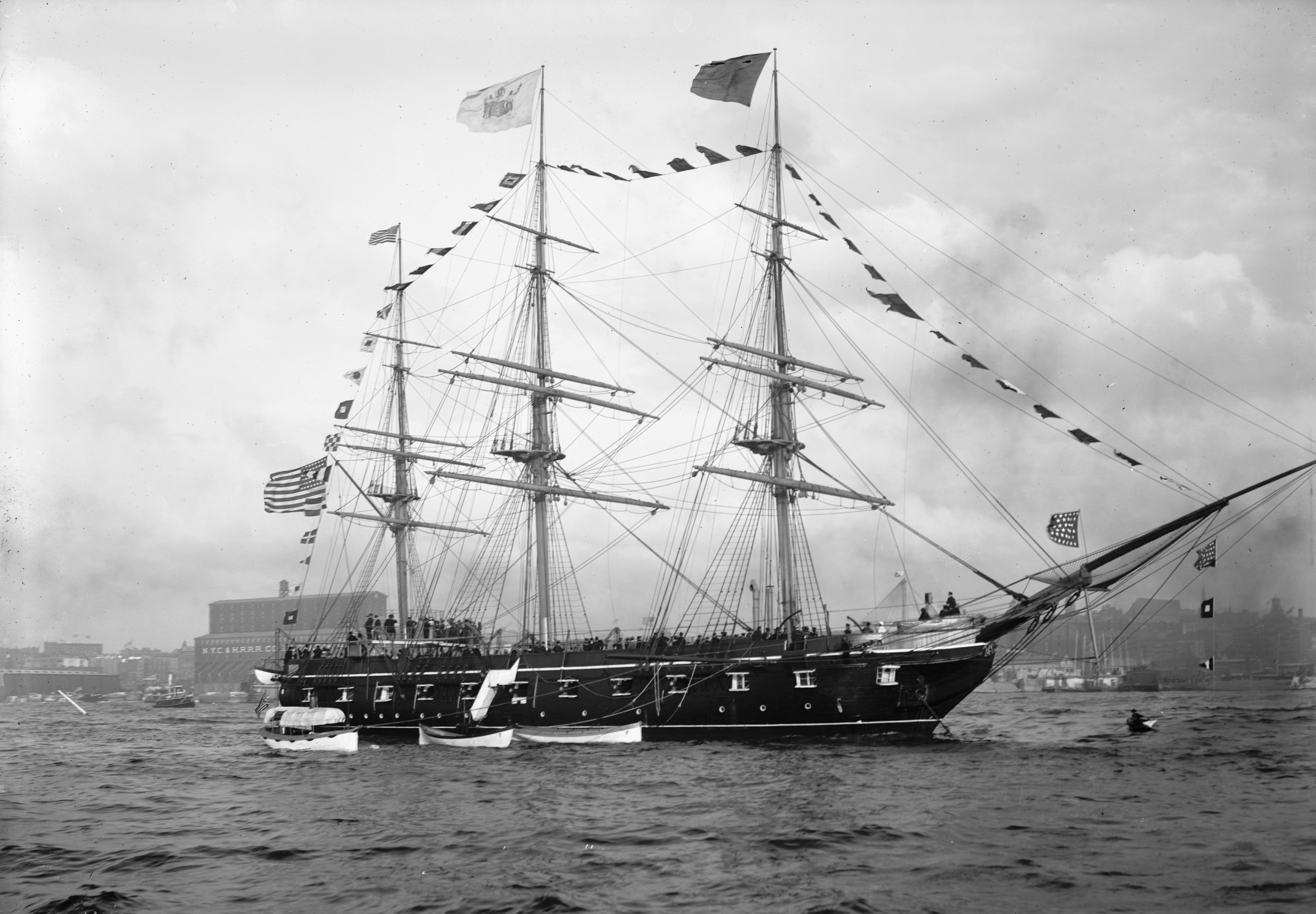
USS Portsmouth, under command of John B. Montgomery, supplied the rebels and later captured Yerba Buena

U.S. Consul Thomas O. Larkin, concerned about the increasing possibility of war, sent a request to Commodore John D. Sloat of U.S. Navy's Pacific Squadron, for a warship to protect U.S. citizens and interests in Alta California. In response, the USS Portsmouth arrived at Monterey on April 22, 1846. After receiving information about Frémont's returning to California, Consul Larkin and Portsmouth's captain John Berrien Montgomery decided the ship should move into the San Francisco Bay. She sailed from Monterey on June 1.

Lt. Gillespie, having returned from the Oregon Country and his meeting with Frémont on June 7, found Portsmouth moored at Sausalito. He carried a request for money, materiel and supplies for Frémont's group. The requested resupplies were taken by the ship's launch up the Sacramento River to a location near Frémont's camp.

== Bear Flag Revolt ==
Bear Flag Revolt
- Los Osos (The Bears)
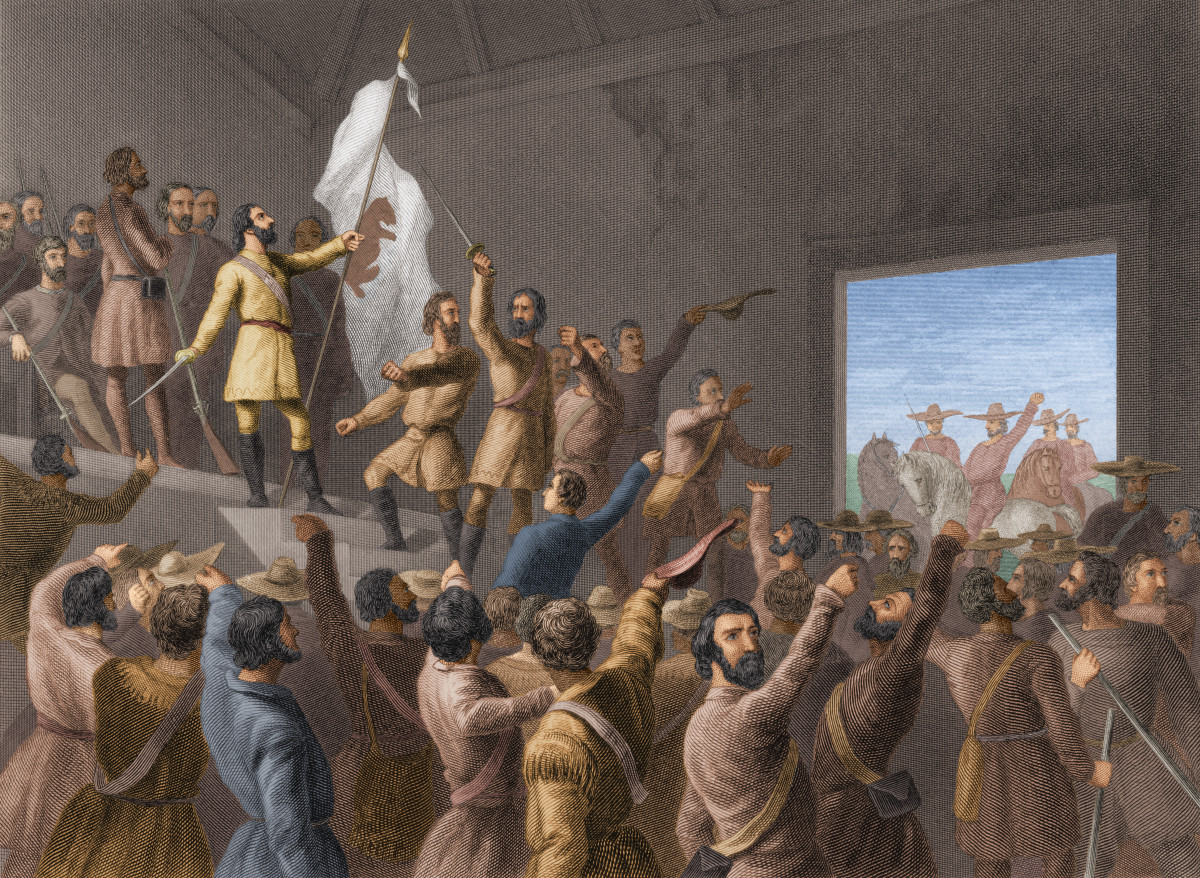
- 1860 romanticized depiction of the Bear Flag Revolt
- Active: June 8, 1846 – July 9, 1846 Centralist Republic of Mexico, Department of Alta California
- Disbanded: 1846
- Allegiance: California Republic; United States
- Type: Militia
- Role: Independence for American settlers from Mexican rule
- Size: 30–300
- Garrison/HQ: Sonoma and Sutter's Fort
- Engagements: Bear Flag Revolt: Battle of Olompali (1846)

Commanders
- Notable commanders: (California Republic) William Ide (California Republic) Ezekiel Merritt (California Republic) Henry Ford

Insignia
- Symbol: California grizzly bear

=== Settlers meet with Frémont ===
William B. Ide, a future leader of the Revolt, writes of receiving an unsigned written message on June 8, 1846: "Notice is hereby given, that a large body of armed Spaniards on horseback, amounting to 250 men, have been seen on their way to the Sacramento Valley, destroying crops and burning houses, and driving off the cattle. Capt. Fremont invites every freeman in the valley to come to his camp at the Butts [sic], immediately; and he hopes to stay the enemy and put a stop to his" – (Here the sheet was folded and worn in-two, and no more is found). Ide and other settlers quickly traveled to Frémont's camp but were generally dissatisfied by the lack of a specific plan and their inability to obtain from Frémont any definite promise of aid.

=== Taking of government horses ===
Some of the group who had been meeting with Frémont departed from his camp and, on June 10, 1846, captured a herd of 170 Mexican government-owned horses being moved by Californio soldiers from San Rafael, and Sonoma to the Californian Commandante General, José Castro, in Santa Clara. It had been reported amongst the emigrants that the officer in charge of the herd had made statements threatening that the horses would be used by Castro to drive the foreigners out of California. The captured horses were taken to Frémont's new camp at the junction of the Feather and Bear Rivers.

These men next determined to seize the pueblo of Sonoma to deny the Californios a rallying point north of San Francisco Bay. Capturing both the arms and military materiel stored in the unmanned Presidio of Sonoma and Mexican Lieutenant Colonel Mariano Guadalupe Vallejo would delay any military response from the Californios. The insurgent group was nominally led by Ezekiel "Stuttering Zeke" Merritt, whom Frémont described as his "field-lieutenant" and lauded for not questioning him.

=== Capture of Sonoma ===
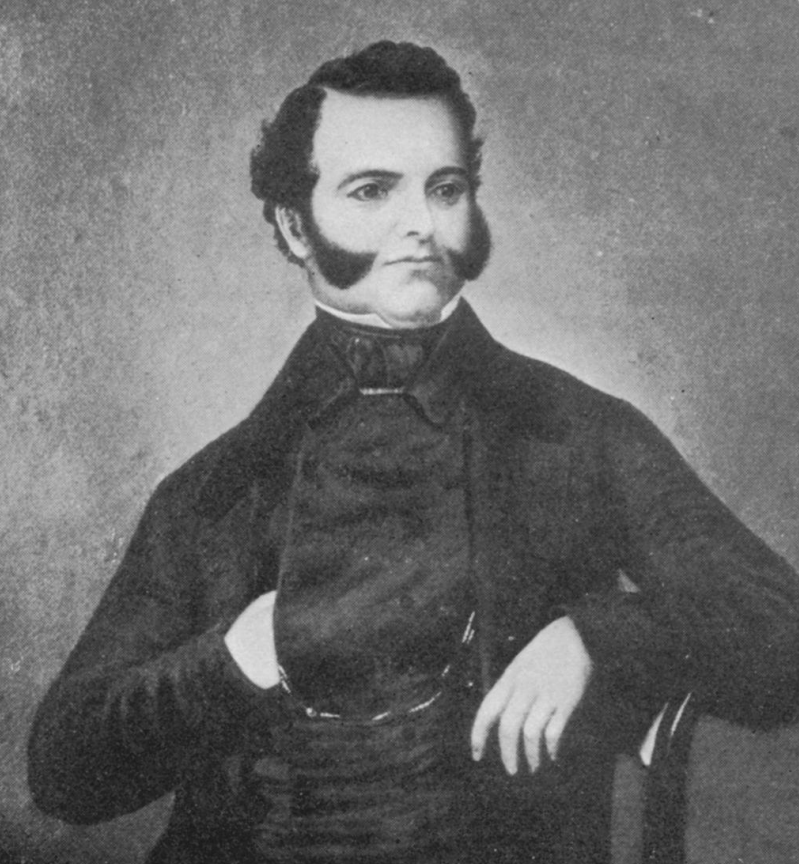
Don Mariano Guadalupe Vallejo, noted Californio statesman and general, made his base in Sonoma.

Historian George Tays has cautioned "The description of the men, their actions just prior and subsequent to the taking of Sonoma, are as varied as the number of authors. No two accounts agree, and it is impossible to determine the truth of their statements." Historian H. H. Bancroft has written that Frémont "instigated and planned" the horse raid, and incited the American settlers indirectly and "guardedly" to revolt.

Before dawn on Sunday, June 14, 1846, over 30 American insurgents arrived at the pueblo of Sonoma. They had traveled overnight from Napa Valley. A majority of their number had started a couple of days earlier from Fremont's camp in the Sacramento valley but others had joined the group along the way. Meeting no resistance, they approached Comandante Vallejo's home and pounded on his door. After a few minutes Vallejo opened the door dressed in his Mexican Army uniform. Communication was not good until American Jacob P. Leese (Vallejo's brother-in-law) was summoned to translate.

Vallejo then invited the filibusters' leaders into his home to negotiate terms. Two other Californio officers and Leese joined the negotiations. The insurgents waiting outside sent elected "captains" John Grigsby and William Ide inside to speed the proceedings. The effect of Vallejo's hospitality in the form of wine and brandy for the negotiators and someone else's barrel of aguardiente for those outside is debatable. However, when the agreement was presented to those outside they refused to endorse it. Rather than releasing the Mexican officers under parole they insisted they be held as hostages. John Grigsby refused to remain as leader of the group, stating he had been deceived by Frémont. William Ide gave an impassioned speech urging the rebels to stay in Sonoma and start a new republic. Referring to the stolen horses Ide ended his oration with "Choose ye this day what you will be! We are robbers, or we must be conquerors!"

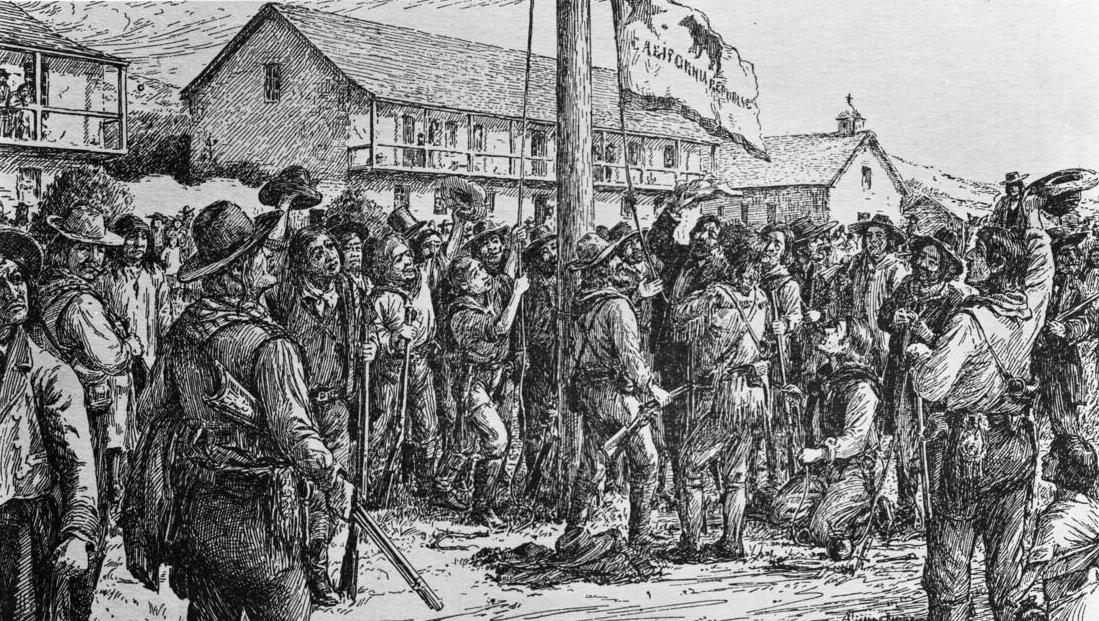
The raising of the Bear Flag and proclamation of the California Republic on June 14, 1846.

At that time, Vallejo and his three associates were placed on horseback and taken to Frémont accompanied by eight or nine of the insurgents who did not favor forming a new republic under the circumstances. That night they camped at the Vaca Rancho. Some young Californio vigilantes under Juan Padilla evaded the guards, aroused Vallejo and offered to help him escape. Vallejo declined, wanting to avoid any bloodshed and anticipating that Frémont would release him on parole.

The Sonoma Barracks became the headquarters for the remaining twenty-four rebels, who within a few days created their Bear Flag (see the "Bear Flag" section below). After the flag was raised Californios called the insurgents Los Osos (The Bears) and "Bear Flaggers" because of their flag and in derision of their often scruffy appearance. The rebels embraced the expression, and their uprising, which they originally called the Popular Movement, became known as the Bear Flag Revolt. Henry L. Ford was elected First Lieutenant of the company and obtained promises of obedience to orders. Samuel Kelsey was elected Second Lieutenant, Grandville P. Swift and Samuel Gibson Sergeants.

=== Ide's proclamation ===
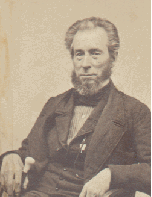
William B. Ide served as the only Commander of the California Republic

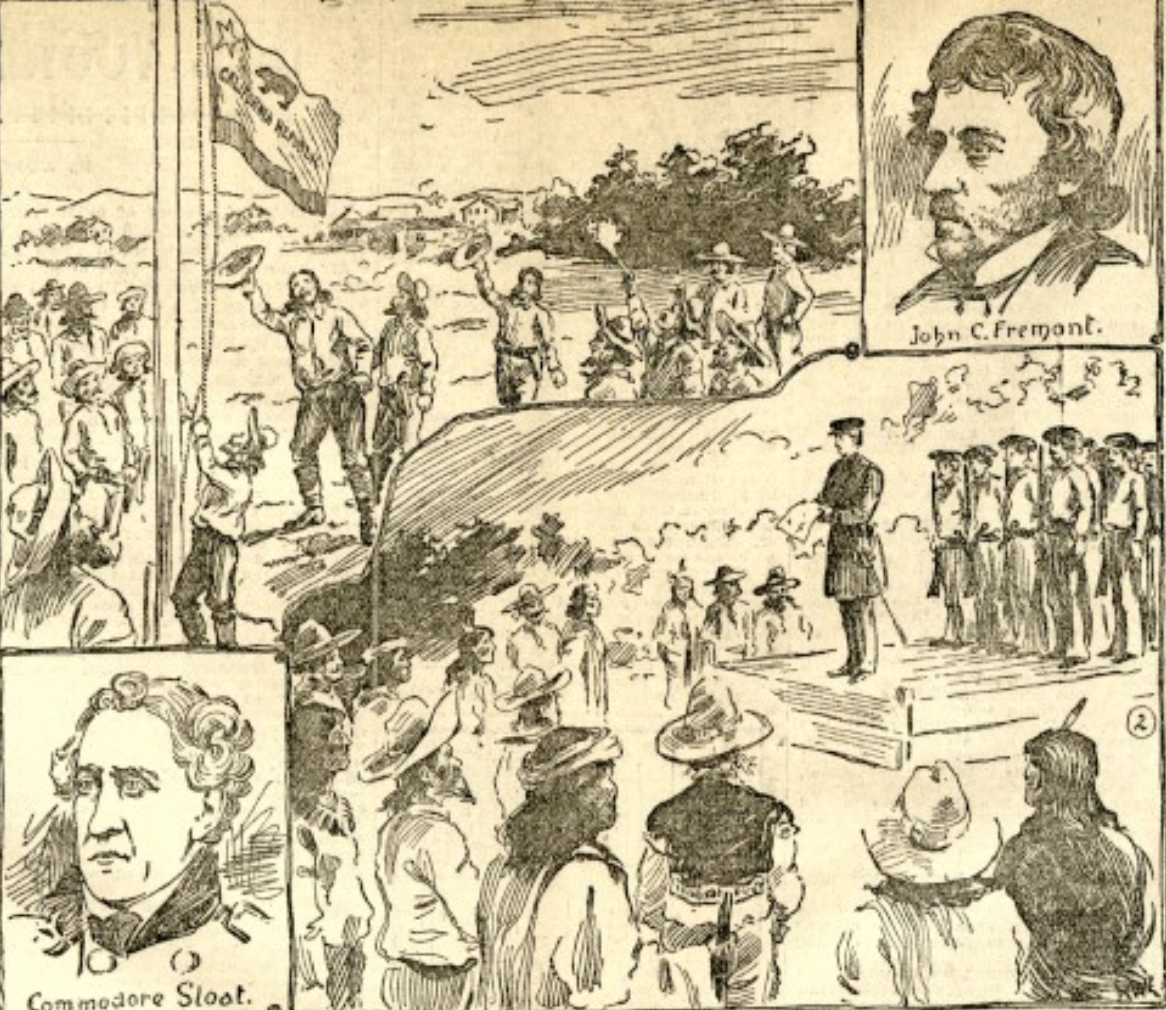
Ide's Proclamation in the bottom right

During the night of June 14–15, 1846 (below), William B. Ide wrote a proclamation announcing and explaining the reasons for the revolt. There were additional copies and some more moderate versions (produced in both English and Spanish) distributed around northern California through June 18.

To all persons, citizens of Sonoma, requesting them to remain at peace, and to follow their rightful occupations without fear of molestation.

The Commander in Chief of the Troops assembled at the Fortress of Sonoma gives his inviolable pledge to all persons in California not found under arms that they shall not be disturbed in their persons, their property or social relations one to another by men under his command.

He also solemnly declares his object to be First, to defend himself and companions in arms who were invited to this country by a promise of Lands on which to settle themselves and families who were also promised a "republican government," who, when having arrived in California were denied even the privilege of buying or renting Lands of their friends, who instead of being allowed to participate in or being protected by a "Republican Government" were oppressed by a "Military Despotism," who were even threatened, by "Proclamation" from the Chief Officer of the aforesaid Despotism, with extermination if they would not depart out of the Country, leaving all of their property, their arms and beasts of burden, and thus deprived of the means of flight or defense. We were to be driven through deserts, inhabited by hostile Indians to certain destruction. To overthrow a Government which has seized upon the property of the Missions for its individual aggrandizement; which has ruined and shamefully oppressed the laboring people of California, by their enormous exactions on goods imported into this country; is the determined purpose of the brave men who are associated under his command.

He also solemnly declares his object in the Second place to be to invite all peaceable and good Citizens of California who are friendly to the maintenance of good order and equal rights (and I do hereby invite them to repair to my camp at Sonoma without delay) to assist us in establishing and perpetuating a "Republican Government" which shall secure to all: civil and religious liberty; which shall detect and punish crime; which shall encourage industry, virtue and literature; which shall leave unshackled by Fetters, Commerce, Agriculture, and Mechanism.

He further declares that he relies upon the rectitude of our intentions; the favor of Heaven and the bravery of those who are bound to and associated with him, by the principle of self preservation; by the love of truth; and by the hatred of tyranny for his hopes of success.

He further declares that he believes that a Government to be prosperous and happyfying [sic] in its tendency must originate with its people who are friendly to its existence. That its Citizens are its Guardians, its officers are its Servants, and its Glory their reward.

— William B. Ide, Head Quarters Sonoma, June 15, 1846

=== Need for gunpowder ===
A major problem for the Bears in Sonoma was the lack of sufficient gunpowder to defend against the expected Mexican attack. William Todd was dispatched on Monday the fifteenth, with a letter to be delivered to the USS Portsmouth telling of the events in Sonoma and describing themselves as "fellow country men". Todd, having been instructed not to repeat any of the requests in the letter (refers to their need for gunpowder), disregarded that and voiced the request for gunpowder. Captain Montgomery, while sympathetic, declined because of his country's neutrality. Todd, José de Rosa (the messenger Vallejo sent to Montgomery), and U.S. Navy Lieutenant John S. Misroon returned to Sonoma in the Portsmouth's launch the morning of the 16th. Misroon's mission was, without interfering with the revolt, to prevent violence to noncombatants.

Todd was given a second assignment. He was sent to Bodega Bay with an unnamed companion (sometimes called 'the Englishman') to obtain powder from American settlers in that area. On June 18, Bears Thomas Cowie and George Fowler were sent to Rancho Sotoyome (near current-day Healdsburg, California) to pick up a cache of gunpowder from Moses Carson, brother of Frémont's scout Kit Carson.

=== Sutter's Fort ===
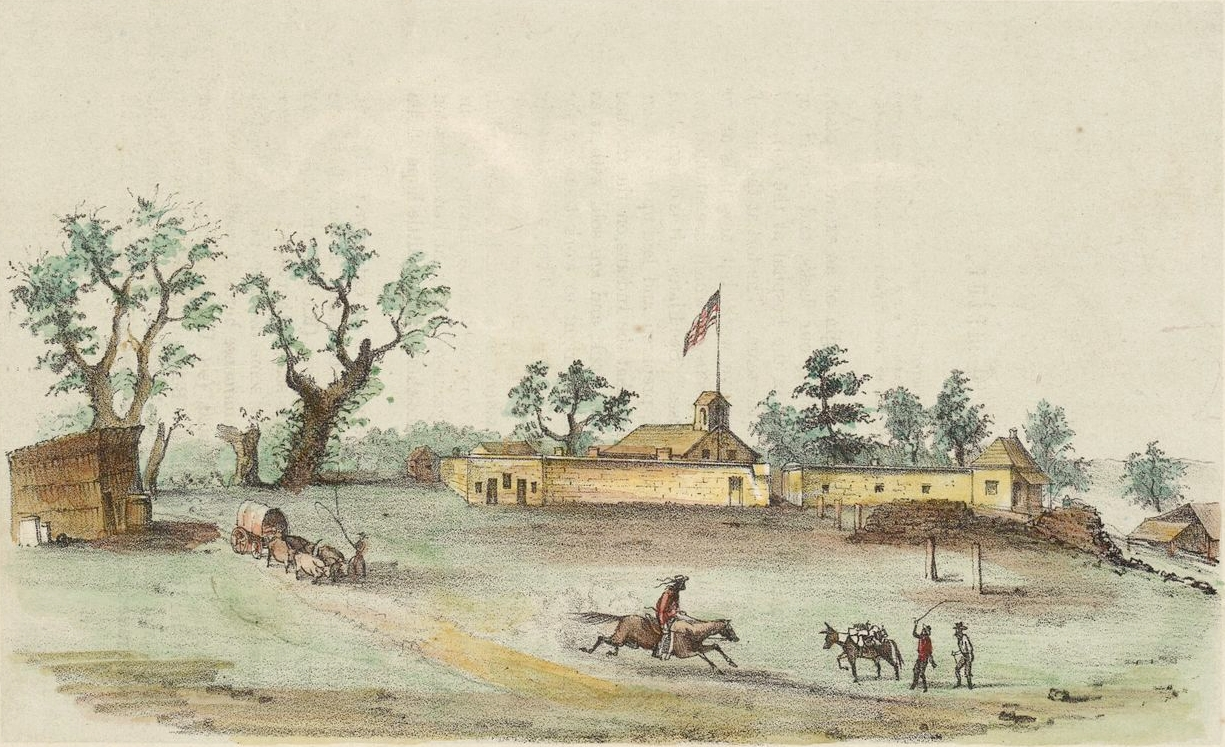
Sutter's Fort was one of two rebel strongholds, having been seized from John Sutter by John Frémont (c. 1849)

Frémont's "field-lieutenant" Merritt returned to Sacramento (known as New Helvetia at the time, so named by the Swiss John Sutter) on June 16 with his prisoners and recounted the events in Sonoma. Frémont either was fearful of going against the popular sentiment at Sonoma or saw the advantages of holding the Californio officers as hostages. He also decided to imprison Governor Vallejo's brother-in-law, the American Jacob Leese, in Sutter's Fort. Frémont recounts in his memoirs, "Affairs had now assumed a critical aspect and I presently saw that the time had come when it was unsafe to leave events to mature under unfriendly, or mistaken, direction … I knew the facts of the situation. These I could not make known, but felt warranted in assuming the responsibility and acting on my own knowledge."

Frémont's artist and cartographer on his third expedition, Edward Kern, was placed in command of Sutter's Fort and its company of dragoons by Frémont. That left John Sutter the assignment as lieutenant of the dragoons at $50 a month, and second in command of his own fort.

While in command there news of the stranded Donner Party reached Kern; Sutter's Fort had been their unreached destination. Kern vaguely promised the federal government would do something for a rescue party across the Sierra, but had no authority to pay anyone. He was later criticized for his mismanagement delaying the search.

=== Castro's response ===
Word of the taking of the government horses, the capture of Sonoma, and the imprisonment of the Mexican officers at Sutter's Fort soon reached Commandante General José Castro at his headquarters in Santa Clara. He issued two proclamations on June 17. The first asked the citizens of California to come to the aid of their country. The second promised protection for all foreigners not involved in the revolt. A group of 50–60 militia under command of Captain Joaquin de la Torre traveled up to San Pablo and, by boat, westward across the San Francisco Bay to Point San Quentin on the 23rd. Two additional divisions with a total of about 100 men arrived at San Pablo on June 27.

=== Battle of Olúmpali ===
On June 20 when the procurement parties failed to return as expected, Lieutenant Ford sent Sergeant Gibson with four men to Rancho Sotoyome. Gibson obtained the powder and on the way back fought with several Californians and captured one of them. From the prisoner they learned that Cowie and Fowler had died. There are Californio and Oso versions of what had happened. Ford also learned that William Todd and his companion had been captured by the Californio irregulars led by Juan Padilla and José Ramón Carrillo.

Ford writes, in his biography, that before leaving Sonoma to search for the other two captives and Padilla's men, he sent a note to Ezekiel Merritt in Sacramento asking him to gather volunteers to help defend Sonoma. Ide's version is that Ford wrote to Frémont saying that the Bears had lost confidence in Ide's leadership. In either case, Ford then rode toward Santa Rosa with seventeen to nineteen Bears. Not finding Padilla, the Bears headed toward one of his homes near Two Rock. The following morning the Bears captured three or four men near the Rancho Laguna de San Antonio and unexpectedly discovered what they assumed was Juan Padilla's group near the Indian rancho of Olúmpali. Ford approached the adobe but more men appeared and others came "pouring out of the adobe". Militiamen from south of the Bay, led by Mexican Captain Joaquin de la Torre, had joined with Padilla's irregulars and now numbered about seventy. Ford's men positioned themselves in a grove of trees and opened fire when the enemy charged on horseback, killing one Californio and wounding another. During the ensuing long-range battle, William Todd and his companion escaped from the house where they were being held and ran to the Bears. The Californios disengaged from the long-range fighting after suffering a few wounded and returned to San Rafael. A Californian militiaman reported that their muskets could not shoot as far as the rifles used by some Bears. This was the only battle fought during the Bear Flag Revolt.

The deaths of Cowie and Fowler, as well as the lethal battle, raised the anxiety of both the Californios, who left the area for safety, and the immigrants, who moved into Sonoma to be under the protection of the muskets and cannon that had been taken from the Sonoma Barracks. This increased the number in Sonoma to about two hundred. Some immigrant families were housed in the Barracks, others in the homes of the Californios.

=== Frémont arrives to defend Sonoma ===
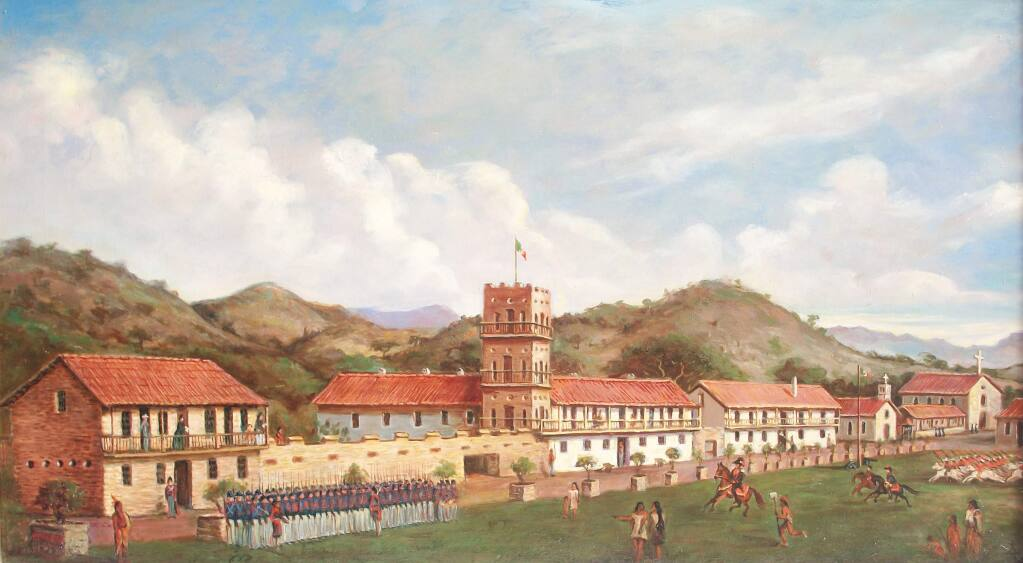
General Vallejo reviewing his troops in the Sonoma Plaza, 1846

Having learned of Ford's request for volunteers to defend Sonoma and hearing reports that General Castro was preparing an attack, Frémont left his camp near Sutter's Fort for Sonoma on June 23. With him were ninety men – his own party plus trappers and settlers under Samuel J. Hensley. Frémont would say in his memoirs that he wrote a letter of resignation from the Army and sent it to his father-in-law Thomas Hart Benton in case the government should wish to disavow his action. They arrived at Sonoma in the early morning of the 25th and by noon were on their way to San Rafael accompanied by a contingent of Bears under Ford's command. They arrived at the San Rafael mission, but the Californios had vanished. The rebels set up camp in the old mission and sent out scouting parties.

On Sunday the 28th a small boat was spotted coming across the bay. Kit Carson and some companions went to intercept it. It held twin brothers Francisco and Ramón de Haro, their uncle José de la Reyes Berreyesa, and an oarsman (probably one of the Castro brothers from San Pablo) – all unarmed. The Haro brothers and Berreyesa were dropped off at the shoreline and started on foot for the mission. All three were shot and killed. Beyond that almost every fact is disputed. Some say Frémont ordered the killings. Others, that they were carrying secret messages from Castro to Torre. Others that Carson committed the homicides as revenge for the deaths of Cowie and Fowler or they were shot by Frémont's Delaware Indians. This incident became an issue in Frémont's later campaign for President. Partisan eyewitnesses and newspapers related totally conflicting stories.

=== Captain de la Torre's ruse ===
Late the same afternoon as the killings, a scouting party intercepted a letter indicating that Torre intended to attack Sonoma the following morning. Frémont felt there was no choice but to return to defend Sonoma as quickly as possible. The garrison there had found a similar letter and had all weapons loaded and at the ready before dawn the next day when Frémont and Ford's forces approached Sonoma – almost provoking firing by the garrison. Frémont, understanding that he had been tricked, left again for San Rafael after a hasty breakfast. He arrived back at the old mission within twenty-four hours of leaving but during that period Torre and his men had time to escape to San Pablo via boat. Torre had successfully used the ruse not only to escape but almost succeeded in provoking a 'friendly fire' incident among the insurgents.

After reaching San Pablo, Torre reported that the combined rebel force was too strong to be attacked as planned. All three of Castro's divisions then returned to the old headquarters near Santa Clara where a council of war was held on June 30. It was decided that the current plan must be abandoned and any new approach would require the cooperation of Pio Pico and his southern forces. A messenger was sent to the Governor. Meanwhile, the army moved southwards to San Juan where General Castro was, on July 6, when he learned of the events in Monterey.

=== Actions in and around Yerba Buena ===
On July 1, Frémont and twelve men convinced Captain William Phelps to ferry them in the Moscow's launch to the old Spanish fort at the entrance to the Golden Gate. They landed without resistance and spiked the ten old, abandoned cannon. The next day Robert B. Semple led ten Bears in the launch to the pueblo of Yerba Buena (the future San Francisco) to arrest the naturalized Englishman Robert Ridley who was captain of the port. Ridley was sent to Sutter's Fort to be locked up with other prisoners.

=== Independence Day, 1846, in Sonoma ===
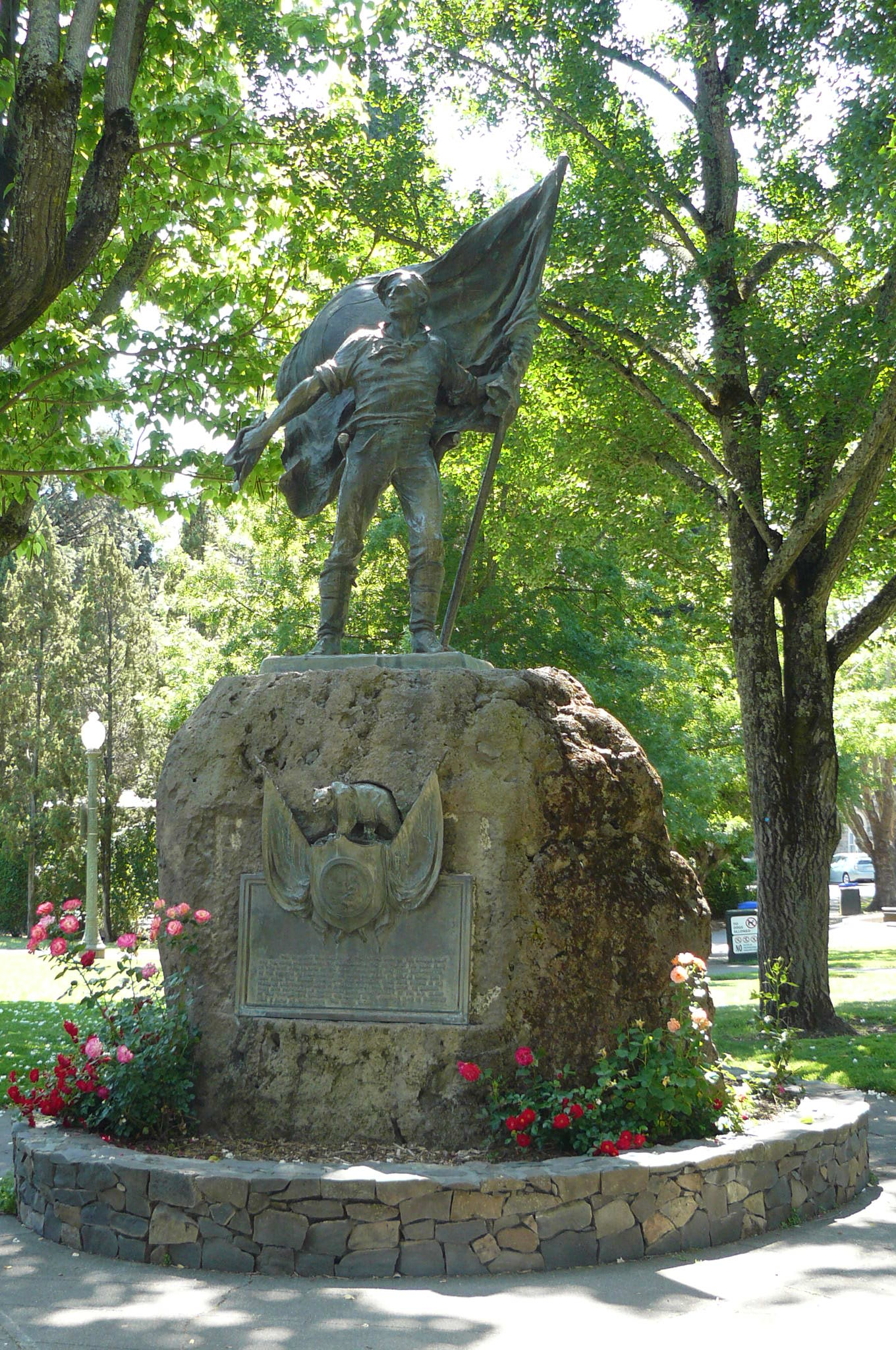
Bear Flag monument in Sonoma commemorating its capture by rebels

A great celebration was held on the Fourth of July beginning with readings of the United States Declaration of Independence in Sonoma's plaza. There were also cannon salutes, the roasting of whole beeves, and the consumption of many foods and all manner of beverages. Frémont and the contingent from San Rafael arrived in time for the fandango held in Salvador Vallejo's big adobe on the corner of the town square.

=== Formation of the California Battalion ===
On July 5, Frémont called a public meeting and proposed to the Bears that they unite with his party and form a single military unit, with Frémont in command. He said that he would accept command if they would pledge obedience, proceed honorably, and not violate the chastity of women. A compact was drawn up which the volunteers of the California Battalion (as it was soon called) and Fremont's men, all numbering about 250, signed or made their marks.

The next day Frémont, leaving the fifty men of Company B at the barracks to defend Sonoma, left with the rest of the battalion for Sutter's Fort. They took with them two of the captured Mexican field pieces, as well as muskets, a supply of ammunition, blankets, horses, and cattle. The seven-ton Mermaid was used for transporting the cannon, arms, ammunition and saddles from Napa to Sutter's Fort.

=== U.S. Navy and U.S. Marine Corps capture Monterey ===
The war against Mexico had already been declared by the United States Congress on May 13, 1846. Because of the slow cross-continent communication of the time, no one in California knew that conclusively. (Official notice of the war finally reached California on August 12, 1846.) Commodore John D. Sloat, commanding the U.S. Navy's Pacific Squadron, had been waiting in Monterey Bay since July 1 or 2 to obtain convincing proof of war. Sloat was 65 years old and had requested to be relieved from his command the previous May. He was also acutely aware of the 1842 Capture of Monterey, when his predecessor, Commodore Thomas ap Catesby Jones, thought war had been declared and captured the capital of Alta California, only to discover his error and abandon it the next day. This resulted in diplomatic problems, and Jones was removed as commander of the Pacific Squadron.

Sloat had learned of Frémont's confrontation with the Californios on Gavilan Peak and of his support for the Bears in Sonoma. He was also aware of Lt. Gillespie's tracking down of Frémont with letters and orders. Sloat finally concluded on July 6 that he needed to act, saying to U.S. Consul Larkin, "I shall be blamed for doing too little or too much – I prefer the latter." Early July 7, the frigate USS Savannah and the two sloops, USS Cyane and USS Levant of the United States Navy, captured Monterey, California, and raised the flag of the United States. Sloat had his proclamation read in and posted in English and Spanish: "...henceforth California will be a portion of the United States".

=== Conclusion and aftermath ===
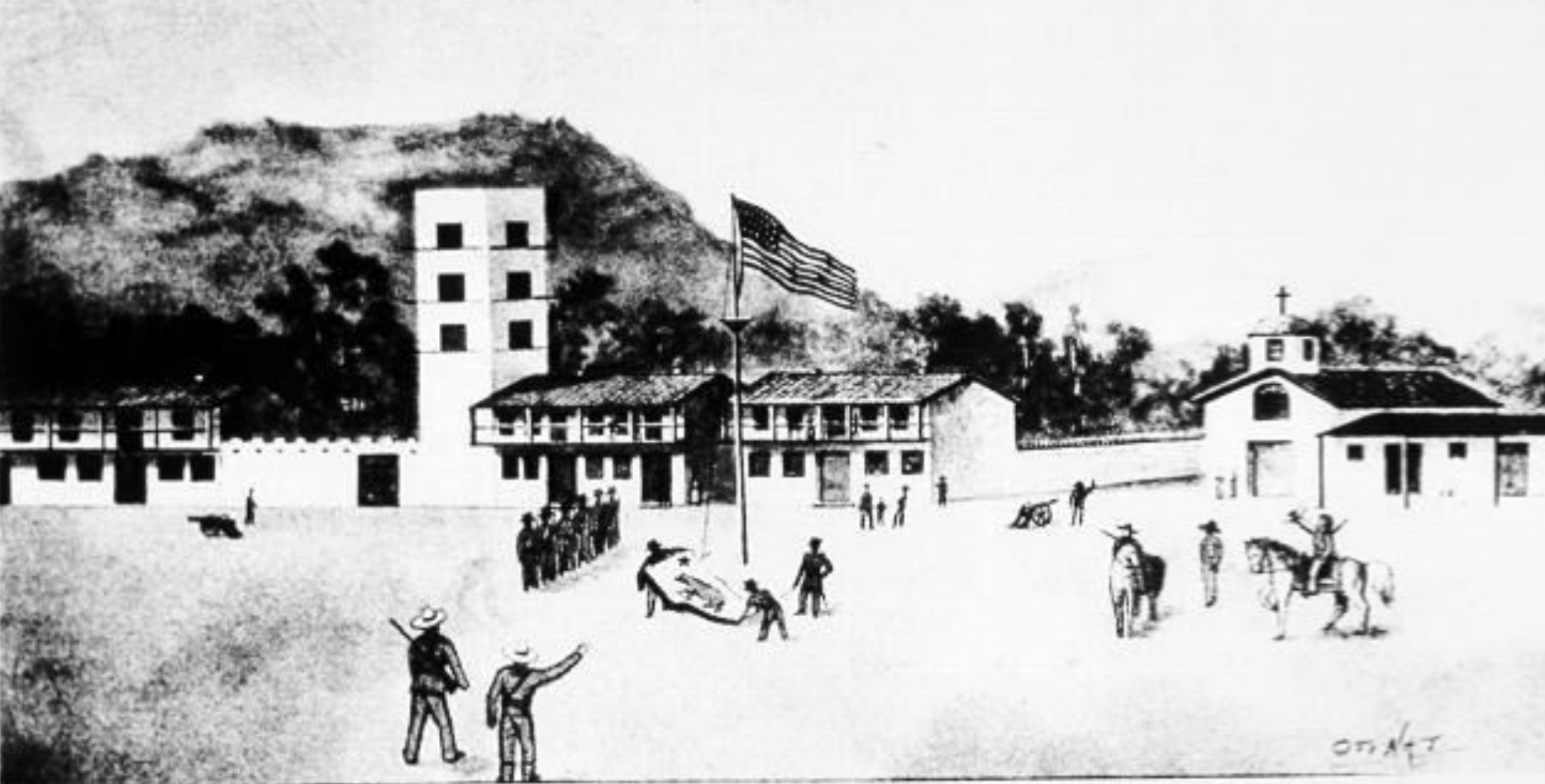
Joseph Revere of the U.S. Navy lowering the Bear Flag and raising the American flag on July 9

Two days later, July 9, the Bear Flag Revolt and whatever remained of the "California Republic" ended when Navy Lieutenant Joseph Revere was sent to Sonoma from the USS Portsmouth, which had been berthed at Sausalito, carrying two 27-star United States flags, one for Sonoma and the other for Sutter's Fort (the squadron had run out of new 28-star flags that reflected Texas' admittance to the Union). The Bear Flag that was taken down that day was given to the Clerk of the Portsmouth, John Elliott Montgomery, the son of Commander John B. Montgomery. John E. wrote to his mother later in July that "Cuffy came down growling". The following November, John and his older brother disappeared while traveling to Sacramento and were presumed deceased. Commander Montgomery kept the Bear Flag, had a copy made, and eventually both were delivered to the Secretary of the Navy. In 1855 the Secretary sent both flags to the Senators from California who donated them to the Society of Pioneers in San Francisco. The original Bear Flag was destroyed in the fires following the 1906 San Francisco earthquake. A replica, created in 1896 for the 50th Anniversary celebrations, is on display at the Sonoma Barracks.

== Bear Flag ==
The most notable legacy of the "California Republic" was the adoption of its flag as the basis of the modern state Flag of California. The flag has a star, a grizzly bear, and a red stripe with the words "California Republic". The Bear Flag Monument on the Sonoma Plaza, site of the raising of the original Bear Flag, is marked by a California Historical Landmark #7.

The design and creation of the original Bear Flag used in the Bear Flag Revolt is often credited to Peter Storm. The flags were made about one week before the storming of Sonoma, when William Todd and his companions claim to have made theirs, apparently based on Mr. Storm's first flags.

In 1878, at the request of the Los Angeles Evening Express, William L. Todd (1818–1879) wrote an account of the Bear Flag used at the storming of Sonoma, perhaps the first to be raised. Soon after, his implementation became the basis for the first official State flag. Todd acknowledged the contributions of other Osos to the flag, including Granville P. Swift, Peter Storm, and Henry L. Ford in an 1878 newspaper article. Todd painted the flag on domestic cotton cloth, roughly a yard and a half in length. The fabric was supplied by Dorcas Prigmore, wife of John Sears. It featured a red star based on the California Lone Star Flag that was flown during California's 1836 revolt led by Juan Alvarado and Isaac Graham. The flag also featured an image of a grizzly bear statant (standing), as opposed to the original flag, which showed it salient (leaping) or rampant (rearing up). The modern flag shows the bear passant (walking).

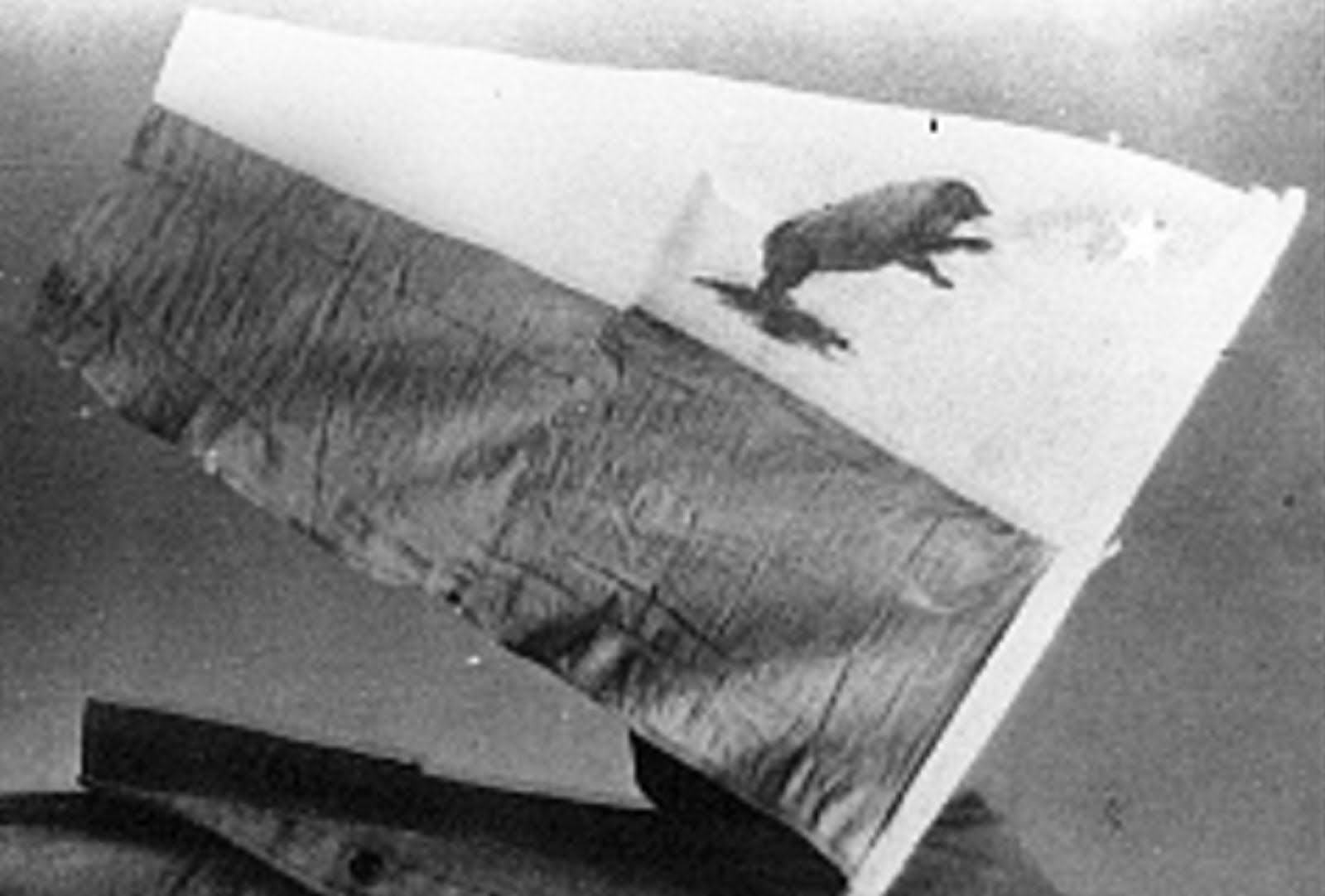
The First Bear Flag, by Peter Storm photographed c. 1870

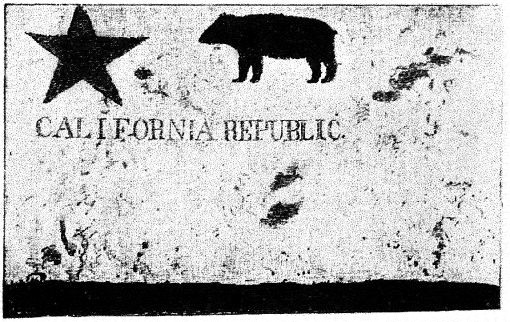
The original of Todd's Bear Flag, photographed in 1890

Modern flag of the State of California, for comparison

== Timeline of events ==
Date	Events surrounding the Bear Flag Revolt
August 16, 1845	John C. Frémont, leading a U.S. Army topographical expedition to survey the Great Basin in Alta California, departed from Bent's Fort in what is now Colorado.
October 1845	Frémont's expedition reached the Salt Lake.
October 17, 1845	Secretary of State James Buchanan dispatched a secret message to U.S. Consul Thomas Larkin in Monterey instructing him to take advantage of any sign of unrest among the Californians.
October 30, 1845	President James K. Polk met with Lt. Archibald Gillespie to send him on a secret mission to California. He departed for Vera Cruz, Mexico, on November 16 carrying orders for Sloat, instructions for Larkin and letters for Frémont.
November 1845	General José Castro, the senior military officer in California, issued a decree ordering all American immigrants in Alta California (about 800) to proceed to Sonoma to swear an oath to Mexico and get a license to settle. Twenty Americans later showed up at Sonoma.
November 1845	Commodore John D. Sloat, commander of the Navy's Pacific Squadron, then off Mazatlán, Mexico, was joined by the Cyane, which carried orders that if Sloat learned "beyond a doubt" that war between the U.S. and Mexico had begun, he was to seize San Francisco Bay and blockade the other California ports.
November 11, 1845	General Castro visited Colonel Mariano Vallejo, commandante of the Mexican garrison in Sonoma.
November 16, 1845	Lt. Archibald Gillespie departed Washington for Vera Cruz, Mexico.
November 27, 1845	The two parts of Frémont's split party had a rendezvous at Walker Lake, northeast of Yosemite Valley.
December 1845	The Frémont expedition entered the Sacramento Valley.
December 10, 1845	Splitting up once more, Frémont and 16 others (including scout Kit Carson) reached Sutter's Fort.
December 29, 1845	President Polk signed legislation admitting Texas to the Union. Mexico refused to recognize the U.S. annexation.
January 1846	John Slidell, appointed by Polk, arrived in Vera Cruz on a mission to negotiate a boundary agreement, and, if Mexico demonstrated a willingness to sell its departments of New Mexico and California, to offer up to $40 million for them.
January 1846	Frémont and his smaller group crossed the San Joaquin Valley to Monterey.
January 27, 1846	Frémont visited Thomas Larkin, the U.S. consul in Monterey. Frémont also met Jose Castro, who agreed to let Frémont winter in the San Joaquin Valley, away from the coast.
mid-February 1846	Frémont met up with the other 45 men in his party and traveled north to the vicinity of the San Jose Mission.
March 5, 1846	After moving his camp to Santa Cruz, Frémont moved it again closer to Monterey on the Salinas River. Via courier, General Castro ordered Frémont to leave. Frémont then set up camp at Gavilan Peak, near San Juan Bautista.
March 6, 1846	Mexican president José Herrera rejected all points of Slidell's proposed negotiation.
March 8, 1846	General Castro assembled a cavalry force of nearly 200 men to confront Frémont near San Luis Bautista.
March 8, 1846	Zachary Taylor moved his army across the Nueces River in Texas, which Mexico considered the southern border of its department of Texas.
March 9, 1846	After receiving a message from Larkin not to oppose Castro, Frémont's band left Gavilan Peak and headed for Sutter's Fort.
mid-March 1846	Larkin sent a message to Sloat at Mazatlán asking one of his ships to come to Monterey. Sloat sent the Portsmouth, John B. Montgomery commanding. Montgomery was tasked to distribute copies of the U.S. and Texas constitutions in Spanish.
March 21, 1846	Frémont arrived at Sutter's Fort to ready a further expedition to the Oregon Territory.
March 28, 1846	Zachary Taylor's force arrived at the Rio Grande near Matamoros.
March 30, 1846	Frémont's party reached Rancho Bosquejo on Deer Creek, 200 miles (320 km) north of Sutter's Fort. His tentative plan was to map a route from the western slope of the Cascades across the Great Basin to link with the Oregon Trail. (Historians have suggested this was a calculated delaying tactic.)
late March 1846	Alarmed by Frémont's transgression at Gavilan Peak, General Castro called a military council in Monterey.
April 5, 1846	Fremont's party carried out the Sacramento River massacre of several hundred Indians near present-day Redding, California.
April 17, 1846	In Monterey, Larkin met with Lt. Gillespie, who had finally arrived in Monterey via Honolulu on the Cyane.
April 17, 1846	In Monterey, Mexico issued a proclamation that unnaturalized foreigners were no longer permitted to hold or work land in California and were subject to expulsion.
April 21, 1846	The Portsmouth anchored in Monterey Bay.
April 24, 1846	Mexican President Mariano Rivera y Arrillaga (who had deposed Herrera), having earlier sent a 5,000-man army northward to Texas, declared a "defensive war" against the United States. The Mexican army arrived in Matamoros on the Rio Grande on April 24.
April 25, 1846	Troops under Zachary Taylor and Mexican General Mariano Arista skirmished north of the Rio Grande. 16 Americans were killed, after which Taylor communicated the events in a message sent to Washington.
May 8, 1846	Frémont, then camped at Upper Klamath Lake in Oregon Territory, learned that a military man (Gillespie) was riding north to intercept him.
May 8, 1846	At Palo Alto on the Rio Grande in Texas, an artillery battle lasted from 2:30 p.m. to nightfall. 5 Americans died, 43 were wounded, and over 30 Mexicans were killed.
May 9, 1846	Frémont met with Gillespie and received letters from wife Jessie, Senator Benton and Secretary of State James Buchanan, as well as Gillespie's memorized messages from Polk, Benton and Larkin.
May 9, 1846	At the Rio Grande, the U.S. and Mexican armies met at Reseca de la Palma. Arista's army was routed, leaving behind 400 wounded. 33 Americans died, 89 were wounded.
May 9, 1846	President Polk received General Taylor's April 25 message.
May 10, 1846	While asleep in the early morning hours, the Frémont camp was attacked by Klamath Indians, killing three of Frémont's party. The Klamath chief was shot dead during the fight.
May 12, 1846	The Frémont party attacked a Klamath village, killing 14 Indians and burning the lodges (see Klamath Lake massacre). The expedition turned back toward California.
May 13, 1846	The United States Congress voted overwhelmingly to declare war on Mexico. Definitive word of the declaration reached California in August.
May 13, 1846	The war secretary sent orders to Colonel Stephen Kearny at Fort Leavenworth, in what is now Kansas, to march west to conquer and occupy the Mexican departments of New Mexico and California.
May 18, 1846	General Taylor's army entered Mexico and occupied Matamoros.
May 18, 1846	Commodore Sloat in Mazatlán received detailed news of the April 25 ambush of Captain Seth Thornton's command on the Rio Grande. Sloat sent the warning of hostilities to Monterey with Captain William Mervine aboard the Cyane, which set sail on May 19.
May 24, 1846	On its way south, the Frémont expedition reached Peter Lassen's ranch and learned that the Portsmouth was anchored at Sausalito. Lt. Gillespie was sent to request supplies (8000 percussion caps, 300 pounds of rifle lead, one keg of powder and food provisions) from Montgomery and to continue on to Monterey to inform Larkin that the expedition would be heading back to St. Louis.
May 31, 1846	Frémont's party, along with Gillespie and his escort, camped at the Buttes, 60 miles north of Sutter's Fort. While there, they killed several Indians near present-day Meridian, California (see Sutter Buttes massacre).
late May 1846	With rumors swirling that General Castro was massing an army against them, American settlers in the Sacramento Valley banded together to meet the threat.
May 31, 1846	Sloat received trustworthy news of Taylor's battles of May 8–9. His orders required him to sail north upon learning "without a doubt" that war had been declared.
early June 1846	Believing that war with Mexico was a virtual certainty, Frémont joined the Sacramento Valley rebels in a "silent partnership."
early June 1846	John Sutter, a Swiss who was a naturalized Mexican citizen, notified his immediate superior, General Castro, of Gillespie's true identity and urged Castro to send a respectable garrison north in the event of trouble.
June 5, 1846	José Castro again visited Mariano Vallejo in Sonoma and collected horses and supplies for his men from Vallejo's ranch.
June 7, 1846	Sloat received news that an American squadron had blockaded Vera Cruz.
June 8, 1846	Among the settlers, William Knight visited William Ide to report the rumor that "armed Spaniards on horseback" had been seen in the valley. The two rode to Frémont's camp north of New Helvetia. Another report to Frémont said that Lt. Francisco Arce, militia officer Jose Maria Alviso, and eight armed men were near Sutter's Fort, driving a herd of 170 horses destined for Santa Clara.
June 8, 1846	Sloat set sail for Monterey on the Savannah, leaving the Warren in Mazatlán to await receipt of the official declaration of war.
June 10, 1846	The frigate Congress, flagship of Commodore Robert F. Stockton, arrived at Honolulu in the Sandwich Islands to land the U.S. Commissioner. Congress later departed for Monterey Bay to join the Pacific Squadron, trailing by a significant distance the sloop Levant, which had departed Mazatlán on May 20, taken on supplies in Hawaii, and also sailed for Monterey.
June 11, 1846	Four men from Frémont's party and 10 volunteers rode out to intercept Arce, surprised him and seized the horse herd, thus initiating the open rebellion of the Osos.
June 11, 1846	The Americans drove the herd north to the Buttes camp, gathering a dozen new volunteers. (Historian H. H. Bancroft later wrote that Frémont "instigated and planned" the horse raid, and incited the American settlers indirectly and "guardedly" to revolt.)
June 13, 1846	34 armed men (none was from Frémont's party) rode from the Buttes to seize the town of Sonoma, force the surrender of Colonel Vallejo, and thus forestall Castro's plan to harry the settlers and force them to leave Mexico. The Osos knew that Sonoma had had no garrison for a year and no finances for one.
June 14, 1846	The Osos entered Sonoma at dawn, rode to Vallejo's Casa Grande and knocked on the door. Vallejo served the Oso leaders food and brandy during a three-hour period in which surrender documents were drafted, with provisions for the Americans to respect the townspeople and their property. Several Osos rejected the surrender. Ezekiel Merritt and John Grigsby asserted that Frémont had ordered the capture of Sonoma. William Ide beseeched his fellow insurgents to keep themselves under control. 24 Osos stood with him and elected him their leader. William Todd fashioned the Bear Flag, which was later raised in Sonoma Plaza. Ten men were selected to escort four prisoners taken from the Vallejo's homestead, including Mariano Vallejo, to the American camp, 80 miles away.
June 14, 1846	Frémont and his band rode to Sutter's Fort, not yet aware of the raid's outcome, to receive the supplies that were requested from Montgomery.
June 15, 1846	The Oregon Territory convention was signed by England and the U.S., ending its joint occupation with England and making most Oregonians below the 49th parallel American citizens.
June 15, 1846	William Ide proclaimed his "Bear Flag Manifesto". Within a week, over 70 more American volunteers joined the Osos.
June 15, 1846	Ide sent Todd to the Portsmouth to notify Montgomery of the events in Sonoma. Todd also requested gunpowder, which was denied.
June 16, 1846	Prisoners and escorts arrived at Frémont's camp. Frémont denied responsibility for the raid. The escorts removed the prisoners to Sutter's Fort. Frémont began signing letters as "Military Commander of U.S. Forces in California."
June 16, 1846	John Montgomery of the Portsmouth in Sausalito sent a small landing party to Sonoma. Ide, in his first act as commander-in-chief, reappointed Jose Berryessa alcalde to continue as local magistrate.
June 16, 1846	Todd returned to Sonoma. He and a companion were then assigned to ride toward Bodega Bay to obtain arms and powder from American settlers.
June 17, 1846	General Castro and Pío Pico, governor of Alta California, condemned the takeover.
June 18, 1846	Thomas Cowie and George Fowler were sent to Rancho Sotoyome (near modern-day Healdsburg) to pick up a cache of gunpowder from Moses Carson, brother of Frémont's scout.
June 19, 1846	The Cyane reached Monterey, 31 days after leaving Mazatlán.
June 20, 1846	After Todd, his companion, Cowie, and Fowler all failed to return, a five-man group obtained powder and also learned from a captured Californian that Cowie and Fowler were tortured and murdered by a patrol of California "irregulars" near Santa Rosa, led by Juan Padilla, and that Todd and his companion had been taken prisoner.
June 23, 1846	50 to 60 men under Captain Joaquin de la Torre traveled to San Pablo and crossed the San Francisco Bay by boat to Point San Quentin.
June 23, 1846	Led by Henry Ford, about 20 Osos rode toward Santa Rosa to search for the two captives and Padilla's men.
June 24, 1846	The search party captured four Californians near San Antonio and also found a corral of horses at Olompali, near the mouth of the Petaluma River, which they assumed belonged to Padilla's group. When they approached the ranchhouse, they discovered about 50 uniformed Californio lancers, in addition to Padilla's group, under the command of Captain Joaquin de la Torre. Ford's men opened fire from a distance, killing one and wounding one. Todd and his partner escaped, while the Californios returned to San Rafael and the Osos went to Sonoma. The "Battle of Olompali" was the only fight of the Bear Flag Republic.
June 25, 1846	After learning of Cowie, Fowler and Ford's patrol, Frémont and his men rode to Sonoma.
June 26, 1846	Frémont, Ford and a detachment of Osos rode south to San Rafael, but were unable to locate de la Torre and his Californios.
June 27, 1846	Two additional divisions of General Castro's troops with a total of about 100 men arrived at San Pablo.
June 28, 1846	General Castro, on the other side of San Francisco Bay, sent a boat across to Point San Pablo with a message for de la Torre. Kit Carson, Granville Swift and Sam Neal rode to the beach to intercept the three unarmed men who came ashore. Two 20-year-old twin brothers and the father of Jose Berryessa were then murdered in cold blood.
June 28, 1846	Frémont's men intercepted a messenger with a letter advising Castro that de la Torre was about to attack Sonoma. Frémont and his forces immediately went there, only to find the Osos prepared to fire upon them as they approached.
June 29, 1846	Realizing he had been tricked, Frémont hurried back to San Rafael and Sausalito in pursuit of de la Torre and his men, who had escaped across the bay and joined Castro in a retreat to Santa Clara.
June 30, 1846	The Levant arrived at Monterey after sailing from Mazatlán via Hawaii.
July 1, 1846	Sloat, sailing from Mazatlán aboard the Savannah, arrived at Monterey.
July 2, 1846	The merchant ship Moscow transported Frémont and several others from Sausalito to Castillo de San Joaquin, an abandoned fort south of the entrance to San Francisco Bay, where they plugged the touch-holes of ten rusty cannons.
July 2, 1846	Several Osos occupied Yerba Buena without resistance.
July 4, 1846	The Bear Flaggers, including Frémont and his men, celebrated Independence Day in Sonoma.
July 4, 1846	Sloat met with Larkin in Monterey.
July 5, 1846	Ide's rebels numbered nearly 300. Frémont, Ide and their officers met to discuss strategy. Frémont announced that a disciplined army was to be formed, which he volunteered to command, by combining his and the Osos' forces. In order to march south, engage Castro and any other Californians, the California Battalion, as it came to be called, combined Frémont's original exploring party and over 200 rebels, Sutter workers and local Indians.
July 5, 1846	Sloat received a message from Montgomery reporting the events in Sonoma and Frémont's involvement.
July 6, 1846	One of the four companies of the California Battalion remained in Sonoma, as the other three left with Frémont for the camp near Sutter's Fort, where they planned the campaign against Castro and the other Californios.
July 6, 1846	Believing Frémont to be acting on orders from Washington, Sloat began to carry out his orders.
July 9, 1846	A landing party demanded the surrender of Monterey. An artillery officer in charge refused. Sloat then landed 225 sailors and marines on the beach. Within minutes the American flag was hoisted, the American ships' cannons added a 21-gun salute, and Sloat read his proclamation of the annexation of Alta California to the United States. A messenger was sent to General Castro at San Juan Bautista requesting his surrender. No shots had been fired.
July 9, 1846	Castro answered in the negative.
July 9, 1846	At 8:00 a.m., Commander John B. Montgomery, with 70 sailors and marines, landed at Yerba Buena, raised the American flag, and claimed San Francisco Bay for the United States. Lt. John S. Missroon read Sloat's proclamation. No Mexican officials were in Yerba Buena.
July 9, 1846	Later that day, Lt. Joseph Warren Revere repeated this ceremony in Sonoma Plaza. The Bear Flag was lowered, and the American flag was raised in its place. The 25-day Bear Flag Republic ended.
July 10, 1846	At his camp, Frémont received a message from Montgomery on the U.S. Navy's occupation of Monterey and Yerba Buena.
July 12, 1846	The American flag flew above Sutter's Fort and Bodega Bay.
July 12, 1846	Frémont's party, including the Bear Flaggers, rode into New Helvetia, where a letter from Sloat awaited them, describing the capture of Monterey and ordering Frémont to bring at least 100 armed men to Monterey. Frémont would bring 160 men.
July 15, 1846	Commodore Robert Field Stockton, sailing from Honolulu, arrived in Monterey to replace the 65-year-old Sloat in command of the Pacific Squadron. On July 23, Sloat named Stockton commander-in-chief of all land forces in California, and on July 29 transferred his whole command to Stockton.
July 16, 1846	Frémont raised the U.S. flag over San Juan Bautista.
July 16, 1846	Governor Pico issued a proclamation on the American invasion and a conscription order for Mexican citizens, which produced about 100 men to join with Castro's force.
July 19, 1846	Frémont's party entered Monterey. Frémont met with Sloat on board the Savannah. When Sloat learned "to his horror" that Frémont had acted on his own authority without orders or knowledge of war, Sloat abruptly ended the meeting.
July 23, 1846	Stockton mustered Frémont's party and the former Bear Flaggers into military service as the "Naval Battalion of Mounted Volunteer Riflemen" with Frémont in command.
July 26, 1846	Stockton ordered Frémont and his battalion to San Diego to prepare to move northward to Los Angeles.
July 29, 1846	Sloat ordered the release of Vallejo and the other prisoners at Sutter's Fort. Sloat turned command over to Stockton and left for home. Stockton issued a proclamation annexing California to the U.S. General Castro in Santa Clara subsequently began to move south to Los Angeles with about 100 men.
July 29, 1846	The battalion landed and raised the U.S. flag in San Diego.
late July 1846	A garrison of Stockton's men raised the U.S. flag at Santa Barbara.
August 1, 1846	An ill and much thinner Vallejo was released from Sutter's Fort. While in confinement, 1000 of his cattle and 600 horses were stolen.
August 1, 1846	Stockton's 360 men arrived in San Pedro.
August 2, 1846	Two representatives of Castro arrived at Stockton's camp with a message expressing Castro's willingness to negotiate for peace. Stockton rejected the terms of the letter.
August 7, 1846	Stockton penned a return message to Castro, who also rejected its terms, including that California cease to be part of Mexico.
August 9, 1846	Castro held a war council at La Mesa, expressed doubts about his forces, and wrote a farewell address to the people of California. Governor Pico read Castro's message to the legislature in Los Angeles, which then adjourned sine die. Pico penned an open farewell letter.
August 10, 1846	Castro and 20 men rode toward the Colorado River and reached the Mexican state of Sonora in September. Pico left to hide out in San Juan Capistrano for one month and eventually made his way to Baja California and Sonora.
August 12, 1846	Official notice of the U.S. declaration of war reached Monterey aboard the Warren.
August 13, 1846	Stockton's army entered Los Angeles unopposed.
August 17, 1846	Stockton issued a proclamation announcing that California was now part of the United States.
August 22, 1846	Stockton sent a report to Secretary of State Bancroft that "California is entirely free from Mexican dominion."

== See also ==
- Bibliography of California history
- Bibliography of the Mexican American War
- Bibliography of James K. Polk
- Benjamin Dewell, member of the Bear Flag Rebellion
- Republic of Lower California/Republic of Sonora, Mexico
- Rough and Ready, California

== Citations ==
- Bancroft, Hubert Howe (1886), History of California, Vol V, San Francisco: History Publishing Company Also at History of California, VOL. V. 1846–1848
- CSMM, The California State Military Museum. "Captain John Charles Fremont and the Bear Flag Revolt".
- Fremont, John Charles (1886), Memoirs of My Life and Times, Vol. 1, Cooper Square Press
- Hague, Harlan; Langum, David J. (1990), Thomas O. Larkin: A Life of Patriotism and Profit in Old California, University of Oklahoma Press
- Harlow, Neal (1982), California Conquered: The Annexation of a Mexican Province 1846–1850, University of California Press, ISBN 978-0-520-06605-2
- "Ide, Simeon; A Sketch of the Life of William B. Ide". Archived from the original on June 23, 2021.
- Rice, Richard B.; et al. (2001), "Ch. 7", The Elusive Eden: A New History of California
- Richman, Irving B. (1911), California Under Spain and Mexico: 1535–1847, Boston
- Rogers, Fred Blackburn (1990), Montgomery and The Portsmouth, Portsmouth NH
- Rogers, Fred Blackburn (1962), William Brown Ide: Bear Flagger, San Francisco
- SSHP, Sonoma State Historic Park. "General Plan" (PDF). California Dept. Parks and Recreation.
- Tays, George (September 1937). "Mariano Guadalupe Vallejo and Sonoma, a Biography and a History". California Historical Society Quarterly. XVI (3).
- Texas State Historical Society (June 15, 2010). "Mexican Colonization Laws".
- Walker, Dale L. (1999), Bear Flag Rising: The Conquest of California, 1846, New York: Macmillan, ISBN 978-0312866853
- Warner, Barbara R (1996), The Men of the California Bear Flag Revolt and Their Heritage, Sonoma
