= Benjamin Dewell =

American early settler and rancher

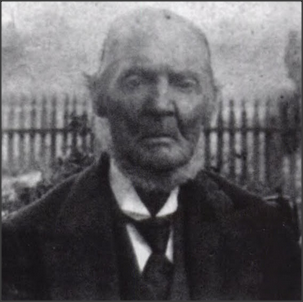
- Born: October 27, 1821; Jefferson County, Ohio, United States
- Died: February 21, 1905 (aged 83); Upper Lake, California, United States
- Known for: First white settler of Lake County, California

Benjamin Dewell (October 27, 1821 – February 21, 1905) was an American early settler and rancher. Dewell and his wife, Celia H. Elliott, were the first white permanent settlers in Lake County, California. Dewell was a member of the "Bear Flag Party" and participated in the Bear Flag Revolt.

== Early life ==
Benjamin Dewell was born in 1821 in Jefferson County, Ohio. In 1840, Dewell moved with his family to Indiana. He was hired in 1845 to serve as a drover for William Bell Elliott, based in Dade County, Missouri. That same year, Dewell traveled with Elliott and his family to California on a wagon train. Dewell settled in Napa County, California in October, spending the winter in Calistoga. In 1846, he moved to Sonoma.

== Bear Flag Rebellion and Mexican–American War ==
By 1846, Dewell was living in Sonoma, California, where the Elliot family lived. Upon his arrival, Dewell became a supporter of the California Republic and fought in the Bear Flag Revolt. The wife of William Elliot provided flannel that would comprise the California Republic flag that was raised on the Sonoma Plaza on the day of the revolt and her daughter, Celia, would help sew the flag. After the revolt, Dewell joined John C. Frémont's California Battalion. The Battalion was sent to Los Angeles in late 1846. Upon arrival the Treaty of Cahuenga was signed, and there were no further armed conflicts of the Mexican–American War in California. Dewell returned to Sonoma, settling in Rancho Los Guilicos, where he would become involved in ranching.

== Life in Lake County ==
Dewell married William Elliott's daughter, Celia, on May 5, 1850, in Santa Rosa, California. On May 24, 1854, the couple moved to Lake County, California. They were the first white people to move permanently to the county. On their move, they brought with them 22 horses and 100 cattle and the settled just north of the then village of Upper Lake, California. Dewell acquired the land by visiting Mariano Guadalupe Vallejo.

He lived the remainder of his life at his ranch in Upper Lake. Dewell sold a portion of his ranch land to a Mr. McCray, which would become the founding plot of land for Upper Lake. Dewell was active in local politics, helping to shape local affairs with his opinion and advice. The Dewell's were not active churchgoers; however, they helped build the first founding churches of Upper Lake.

== Legacy ==
Benjamin Dewell's papers are in the collection of the Society of California Pioneers.
