= Rancho Olómpali =

Mexican land grant in California

Coordinates: 38.16°N 122.62°W

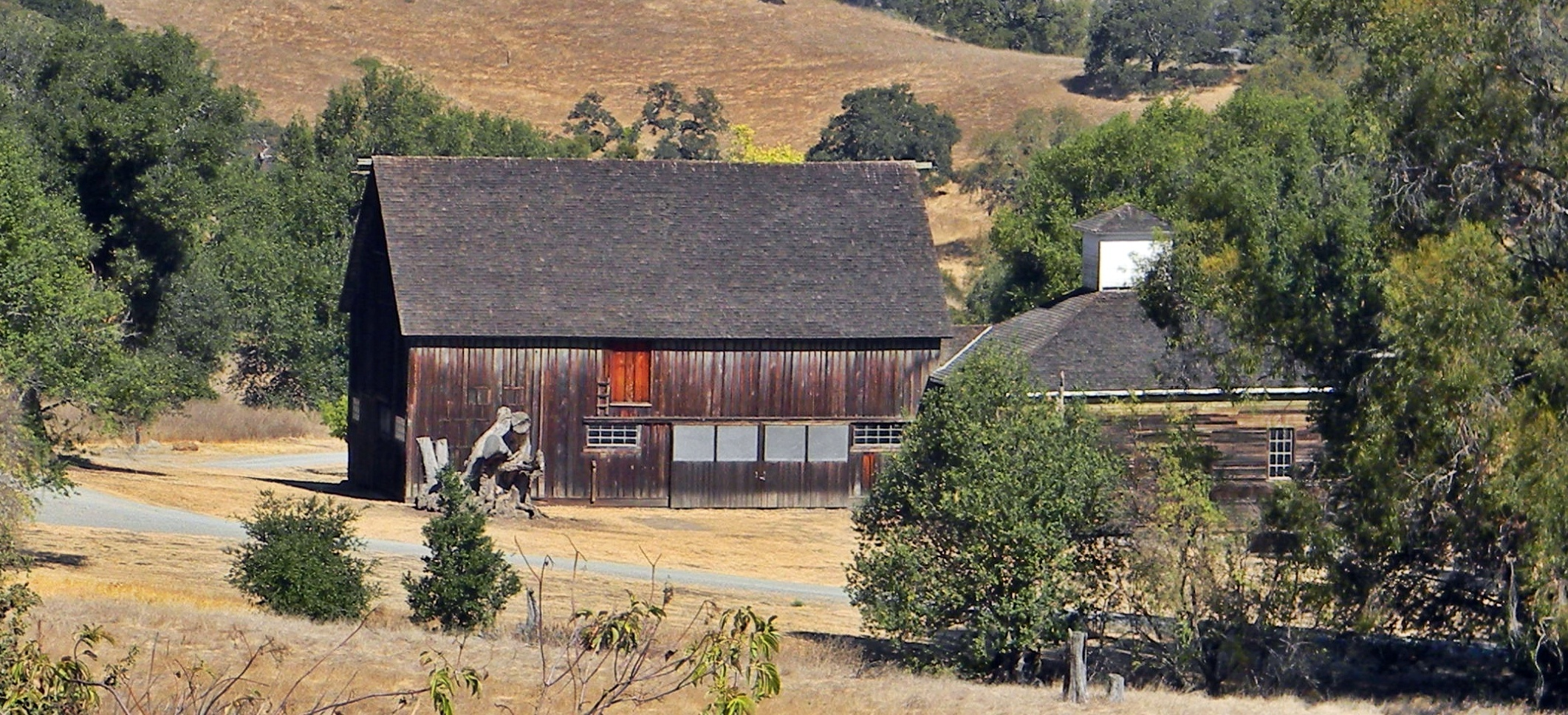
Burdell Barn at Rancho Olómpali

Rancho Olómpali was a 8,877-acre (35.92 km^{2}) Mexican land grant in present-day Marin County, California given in 1834 by governor Manuel Micheltorena to Camilo Ynitia, son of a Coast Miwok chief. The name Olómpali comes from the Coast Miwok language and likely means southern village or southern people. The land grant is between present-day Novato and Petaluma. A part of this land now comprises the Olompali State Historic Park.

== History ==
In 1843 Mexican governor Micheltorena granted Rancho Olómpali to Camilo Ynitia. Camilo was the only Native American on the northern frontier of Alta California to secure and keep a large land grant for his tribe.

With the cession of California to the United States following the Mexican-American War, the 1848 Treaty of Guadalupe Hidalgo provided that the land grants would be honored. As required by the Land Act of 1851, a claim for Rancho Olómpali was filed with the Public Land Commission in 1852, and the grant was patented to Camilo Ynitia in 1862.

In 1852 Ynitia sold most of his land to James Black, grantee of Rancho Cañada de Jonive and one of the largest landowners in Marin County. Black's daughter, Mary, married Dr. Galen Burdell. Black's wife, Maria Agustina Sais, died in Dr. Burdell's dental chair in 1864. In 1866 Black married Maria Loreto Duarte, Ygnacio Pacheco's widow. James Black died in 1870.

== Historic sites of the Rancho ==
- Olompali State Historic Park. The first of two adobes on the site was the home of the hoipu, or head man, of Olómpali and the father of Camilo Ynitia, who was to be the last hoipu of the village. It is disputed whether the first adobe was dismantled to provide bricks for Camilo's adobe at about 1837. The second adobe is the only adobe home in Marin county; its remains are protected within Olompali State Historic Park. Ynitia's adobe house was the site of the Battle of Olómpali in June 1846 during the Bear Flag Revolt.

== See also ==
- Battle of Olómpali
- Ranchos of California
- List of Ranchos of California
