= Olompali, California =

Olompali Olómpali Õlõmpõ'llï
- Former settlement
- Location in California
- Coordinates: 38°09′N 122°34′W
- Country: United States
- State: California
- County: Marin County

Olompali (Coast Miwok:Õlõmpõ'llï; Spanish: Olómpali) is a former Native American settlement in Marin County, California. It was located 5 miles (8 km) south of Petaluma.

Its site now lies within the Olompali State Historic Park.

== Geography ==
The site lies on the waterfront at the foot of Burdell Mountain.

== History ==
The name comes from the Coast Miwok language Olompais and likely means "southern village" or "southern people". The Coast Miwok had inhabited a site within the State Historic Park continuously from as early as 6000 BC. Unlike other settlements in the Bay Area that required seasonal migrations for year-round feeding, the resources available around Olompali made the village occupied all year-round.

Olompali had been a main center in 1200, and might have been the largest native village in Marin County.

According to senior state archeologist E. Breck Parkman, a secret matriarchal society, the Máien, existed among the Indigenous people of the Bay Area, including the Olompali people. Between 1816 and 1818, 10 Máien women from Olompali were baptized in the Mission San Jose de Guadalupe. Records also show that between 1814 and 1822, 250 members of the Olompali settlement were baptized.

After California became part of the United States, its last-standing chief Ynitia (born Huemox) was able to maintain ownership over Olompali.

An article in the Marin Journal from March 1911 mentions that relics and remains of the Olompali people were still scattered all across the county. Mounds of shell and soil from their settlement have been leveled in 1874 and 1875, and used to fill land in Marin County.

== Bibliography ==
- Carlson, Pamela McGuire, and E. Breck Parkman, An Exceptional Adaptation: Camillo Ynitia, the Last Headman of the Olompalis, California History 65 (4): 238–247, 309–310. San Francisco: California Historical Society, 1986
- Charles M. Slaymaker, Cry for Olompali, privately printed, 1972

== See also ==
- Rancho Olompali
- Miwok villages
