= Olompali State Historic Park =

700-acre State park in Marin County, California

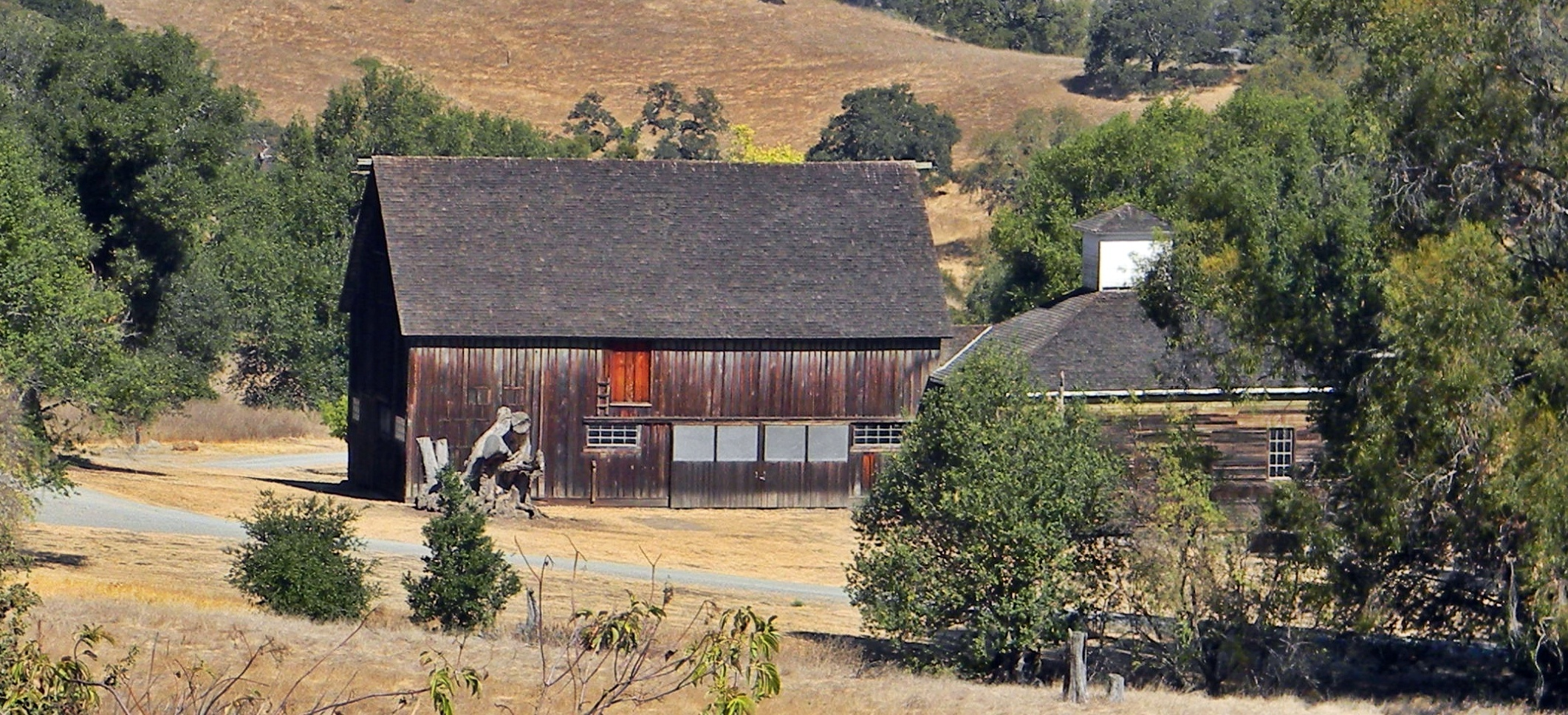
- The Burdell Barn at Olompali State Historic Park

- Location within California Location within the United States
- Location: Marin County, California, United States
- Nearest city: Novato, California
- Coordinates: 38°9′9″N 122°34′11″W
- Area: 700 acres (2.8 km^{2})
- Governing body: State of California

U.S. National Register of Historic Places
- Official name: Rancho Olompali
- Designated: January 12, 1973
- Reference no.: 73000409
- Built: 1840

California Historical Landmark
- Official name: Oldest House North of San Francisco Bay
- Reference no.: 210

Olompali State Historic Park is a 700-acre (2.8 km^{2}) California State Park in Marin County, California. It consists of the former Rancho Olómpali and was the site of the famed Battle of Olómpali during the Bear Flag Revolt. Rancho Olómpali was purchased by the Californian government in 1977, which turned it into a public park.

== Significance ==
The park is the site of the oldest surviving house north of the San Francisco Bay, built in 1776 of adobe bricks by the chief of the Olompolli band of the Coast Miwok tribe. It is California Historical Landmark #210.

The chief's son, given the Spanish Mission Indian name of Camilo Ynitia (alternatively spelled 'Camillo'), was the only Californian Native American in Northern California to confirm and keep a large Mexican-era land grant in the post—Mexican Cession U.S. era.

== History ==
=== Prehistoric—Native American era ===
The name "Olompali" comes from the Coast Miwok language and likely means "southern village" or "southern people". The Coast Miwok village site of Olompali (alternatively spelled "Olompolli", "Olompoli" or "Olumpali") dates back to about 500 CE. Olompali had been a main center in 1200 CE, and might have been the largest native village in Marin County.

An Elizabethan English silver sixpence minted in 1567 was discovered in the park by archeologists, indicating that villagers may have had contact with Sir Francis Drake, or with people who had traded with the early English explorer. Many Miwok cultural artifacts have been identified during archaeological studies within the area of the present-day park, indicating this may have once been an important trade and cultural crossroads.

The oldest house built north of the San Francisco Bay was built here in 1776 by the Coast Miwok, out of adobe bricks, and owned by the chief of the Olompoli tribe Aurelio, who was the father of Camillo Ynitia. Camillo was known as the last Hoipu (Headman) of the Miwok community living at Olompali.

=== Mexican era—Rancho Olompali ===
In 1843, with the helpful petition of General Vallejo, Governor Manuel Micheltorena of Alta California granted the land of Rancho Olompali to Camillo Ynitia, the acting Hoipu (Headman) of the village:

"Olompali #48, Marin Co., Grant of 2 sq. leagues made in 1843 by Gov. Micheltorena to Camilo Unitia [sic]. Patent for 8,877.48 acres (35.9259 km^{2}) issued in 1862 to Camilo Unitia [sic] in T 3-4N, R 6-7W, MDM."

— California Ranchos: Patented Private Land Grants Listed by County, Shumway 1988:39

The newly secured grant of Rancho Olompali included Ynitia's father's historic house, the first adobe house built north of the San Francisco Bay, as well as his own adobe house.

Ynitia's adobe house was the site of the Battle of Olompali in June 1846, during the Bear Flag Revolt.

Ynitia held onto the Olompali land title for 9 years, but in 1852 he sold most of the land to James Black of Marin for $5,200. Black was to become one of the largest landowners of Marin County. Ynitia retained 1,480 acres (6.0 km^{2}) of Olompali called Apalacocha.

=== The Blacks and Burdells ===
In 1863 the land and adobe house passed from James Black to his daughter Mary (Black) Burdell and her husband Galen Burdell, a wealthy dentist. Mary's son James transformed Olompali into a country estate, he built a 26-room mansion with a formal Victorian-style mansion that incorporated the foundations and rooms of Ynitio's adobe house.

=== Jesuit retreat, commune and state park ===
The land and estate was eventually sold by the Burdell family to Court Harrington. Harrington in turn sold it to the University of San Francisco, to be used as a Jesuit retreat.

During the 1960s, the University of San Francisco sold Olompali several times. Each time, the buyers defaulted and the property reverted to the university. The most famous tenant was the rock band Grateful Dead. During the Dead's brief stay it became a gathering place for San Francisco's rock musicians, including Janis Joplin and Grace Slick.

In 1967 Don McCoy leased Olompali, and started a hippie commune there called The Chosen Family. By February 1969 the Burdell Mansion had been destroyed by an electrical fire, a fatal car wreck had been caused by the commune's loose animal, narcotics raids had been conducted by authorities, and Don McCoy had been placed in a mental ward. Two small children then drowned on the commune, after which the residents were evicted by their Jesuit landlords. Finally, in 1977, the State of California purchased the land and turned it into the state park.

== Location ==
Olompali State Historic Park is located at 8901 Redwood Highway, State Highway 101 (P.M. 24.8), 3.5 miles (5.6 km) north of Novato. It is also listed on the National Register of Historic Places as Rancho Olompali. Ynitia's adobe house is registered as California Historical Landmark #210.

== Notes ==
=== Sources ===
- Reutinger, Joan (September 1997). "Olompali Park Filled With History". The Coastal Post. Archived from the original on February 1, 1998.
- California State Parks, Office of Historic Preservation — Marin County landmarks
- Olompali State Historic Park; by California Department of Parks and Recreation; 2008.
- Shumway, Burgess M. (1988). California Ranchos: Patented Private Land Grants Listed by County. San Bernardino, Calif.: The Borgo Press. ISBN 0-89370-935-2.
