= Rancho Arroyo Seco =

Mexican land grant in California

Coordinates: 36.330°N 121.290°W

Rancho Arroyo Seco was a 16,523-acre (66.87 km^{2}) Mexican land grant in the Salinas Valley, in present-day Monterey County, California. It was given in 1840 by Governor Juan B. Alvarado to Joaquín de la Torre.

The grant extended along the west bank of the Salinas River at Arroyo Seco Creek, and encompassed present-day Greenfield.

== History ==
José Joaquín de la Torre was a soldier who was Alcalde of Monterey, and afterwards secretary to Governor Pablo Vicente de Solá. Torre married Maria Los Angeles Cota (1790–1877) in 1803. Torre was granted the two square league Rancho Bolsa del Potrero y Moro Cojo in 1822 by Governor Sola, and the four square league Rancho Arroyo Seco in 1840 by Governor Alvarado. In 1845, Joaquin de la Torre and a detachment of fifty-six armed and mounted volunteers, was sent by Alvarado to capture Los Angeles. The raid upon the unsuspecting pueblo was accomplished quickly and the Pico brothers, along with José Antonio Carrillo, were taken into custody. Joaquín de la Torre commanded José Castro's troops at the Battle of Olompali in 1846.

With the cession of California to the United States following the Mexican-American War, the 1848 Treaty of Guadalupe Hidalgo provided that the land grants would be honored. As required by the Land Act of 1851, a claim for Rancho Arroyo Seco was filed with the Public Land Commission in 1852, and the grant was patented to Joaquín de la Torre in 1859. The rancho was later acquired by Pedro Zabala. The property remained in the Zabala family for many years. The Zabala family currently operates Zabala Vineyards on a portion of the rancho.

John S. Clark founded the California Home Extension Association which in 1902, purchased of 4,000 acres (16 km^{2}) of Rancho Arroyo Seco. The colony grew and became known as Clark City, and eventually as Greenfield.

== See also ==
- Ranchos of California
- List of Ranchos of California
