= Rancho Laguna de San Antonio =

Mexican land grant in California

Coordinates: 38.220°N 122.770°W

Rancho Laguna de San Antonio was a 24,903-acre (100.78 km^{2}) Mexican land grant in present-day Marin County and Sonoma County, California given in 1845 by Governor Pío Pico to Bartolomé Bojorquez. The grant encompassed Chileno Creek and Laguna Lake.

== History ==
Bartolomé Bojórquez (1780–1863) was the son of Pedro Antonio Bojorques, who came to California with the De Anza Expedition. In 1803, Bartolomé married Maria Nicolasa Linares (1784–1869) and they had 7 children (2 male and 5 female). Bojorquez, a soldier serving at the Presidio of San Francisco, was granted the six-square-league Rancho Laguna de San Antonio in 1845.

With the cession of California to the United States following the Mexican-American War, the 1848 Treaty of Guadalupe Hidalgo provided that the land grants would be honored. As required by the Land Act of 1851, a claim for Rancho Laguna de San Antonio was filed with the Public Land Commission in 1852, and the grant was patented to Bartolomé Bojorquez in 1871.

In 1851, Bojorquez gave a one-ninth undivided interest in the rancho to each of his seven children, and one each for himself and his wife. The Bojorques lost their property due to foreclosure of loans against the property.

== See also ==
- List of Ranchos of California
