= List of battles of the Mexican–American War =

The battles of the Mexican–American War include all major engagements and most reported skirmishes, including Thornton's Defeat, the Battle of Palo Alto, and the Battle of Resaca de la Palma, which took place prior to the official start of hostilities.

== Background ==
The Mexican–American War lasted from 1846 until 1848. It grew out of unresolved border disputes between the Republic of Texas and Mexico after the United States annexed Texas nine years after the Texas Revolution. It ended in 1848 with the Treaty of Guadalupe Hidalgo in which Mexico was forced to sell a vast tract of land that amounted to almost half its national territory to the United States.

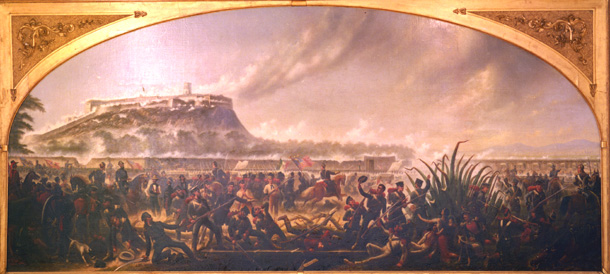
Depiction of the Battle of Chapultepec

== List of battles ==
Key
(A) – American Victory
(M) – Mexican Victory
(I) – Inconclusive

== 1846 ==
Battle	Date	Engagement remarks	Result
Thornton Affair	April 25/26	Skirmishing in the disputed borderlands of South Texas.	(M)
Siege of Fort Texas	May 3–9	American forces withstand Mexican Army attacks.	(A)
Battle of Palo Alto	May 8	Mexican Army under Mariano Arista in the disputed land between the Rio Grande (Río Bravo) and the Nueces River engage an American army attempting to lift the aforementioned Siege of Fort Texas.	(A)
Battle of Resaca de la Palma	May 9	Arista is defeated by Zachary Taylor.	(A)
Occupation of Matamoros	May 18	U.S. troops occupy Matamoros, Tamaulipas, with no resistance. More than 300 sick and wounded Mexicans were captured in the hospitals. Also abandoned were 5 spiked guns.	(A)
Battle of Monterey	July 7	U.S. Navy occupies Monterey, California.	(A)
Capture of Yerba Buena	July 10	U.S. Navy occupies Yerba Buena (present-day San Francisco, California).	(A)
Occupation of Camargo, Tamaulipas.	July 14	—	(A)
Capture of Santa Fe	August 18	Kearny occupies Santa Fe, New Mexico.	(A)
Battle of Monterrey	September 21–23	Zachary Taylor forces Pedro de Ampudia to surrender Monterrey.	(A)
Siege of Los Angeles	September 22–30	Led by Gen José María Flores, Californios and Mexicans retake Los Angeles.	(M)
Battle of Chino	September 26–27	Californios defeat and capture 24 Americans, led by Benjamin D. Wilson, who were hiding in an adobe house in Rancho Santa Ana del Chino, near present-day Chino, California.	(M)
Battle of Dominguez Rancho	October 7	Californios, led by José Antonio Carrillo, defeated 203 U.S. Marines led by Navy Captain William Mervine.	(M)
First Battle of Tabasco	October 24–26	Commodore Matthew C. Perry is defeated in San Juan Bautista, Tabasco, by Juan Bautista Traconis.	(M)
Occupation of Tampico, Tamaulipas	November 14	Occupation by the U.S. Navy.	(A)
Occupation of Saltillo, Coahuila	November 16	Occupation by the U.S. Army.	(A)
Battle of Natividad	November 16	Rancho La Natividad located in the Salinas Valley of California.	(A)
Battle of San Pasqual	December 6	Both sides claim victory, Californios departed the battlefield after inflicting heavy losses	(–)
Capture of Tucson (1846)	December 16	The Mormon Battalion captures Tucson, Sonora, and occupies it for a day or two.	(A)
Battle of El Brazito or Bracito	December 25	Also called the "Battle of Temascalitos" in Spanish. Mexican forces attack El Brazito or Bracito, New Mexico. U.S. forces were led by Colonel Alexander William Doniphan.	(A)

== 1847 ==
Battle	Date	Engagement remarks	Result
Battle of Santa Clara	January 2	Fought in 2 1/2 miles west of Mission Santa Clara de Asís, California.	(A)
Battle of Río San Gabriel	January 8	Part of a series of battles for control of Los Angeles.	(A)
Battle of La Mesa	January 9	Last conflict before U.S. forces enters Los Angeles.	(A)
Battle of Cañada	January 24	Sterling Price defeats insurgents in New Mexico.	(A)
First Battle of Mora	January 24	A failed attack by American Forces on Mora, New Mexico, led by Israel Hendley on January 24.	(M)
Battle of Embudo Pass	January 29	Last insurgent stands before the Siege of Pueblo de Taos.	(A)
Second Battle of Mora	February 1	On February 1, another American expedition armed with howitzers succeeded in razing the village of Mora in New Mexico.	(A)
Siege of Pueblo de Taos	February 3/4	Rancheros and Mexican Militia surrender to U.S. forces thus ending the Taos Revolt.	(A)
Battle of Buena Vista	February 22/23	Zachary Taylor fights Antonio López de Santa Anna south of Saltillo in one of the largest battles of the war.	(I)
Battle of the Sacramento	February 28	Doniphan defeats a larger Mexican army at the Sacramento River Pass before the capture of Chihuahua.	(A)
Siege of Veracruz	March 9–29	Beginning with Marine landings, U.S. forces besiege and gradually encircle Mexican Marines and Coast Guard in a vicious twenty-day siege.	(A)
Battle of Cerro Gordo	April 18	Dubbed by the U.S. the "Thermopylae of the West."	(A)
First Battle of Tuxpan	April 18	Commodore Matthew C. Perry seizes the port city of Tuxpan on the Gulf coast.	(A)
Capture of Perote	April 22	Perote Castle, considered the strongest fortress in Mexico after Veracruz, surrendered without resistance to General William J. Worth, following the battle of Cerro Gordo. 54 Guns and mortars, and 500 muskets were captured. Annual Reports 1894, War Department trophy guns list 4- 17 inch mortars.	I (A)
Battle of Red River Canyon	May 26	New Mexican insurgents fight a skirmish with United States troops.	(A)
Second Battle of Tuxpan	June	Perry's Mosquito Fleet engages Mexicans at Tuxpan for a second time.	(A)
Third Battle of Tuxpan	June 30	Perry's Mosquito Fleet engages Mexicans for the third time.	(A)
Second Battle of Tabasco	June 16	Commodore Matthew C. Perry captures Villahermosa, Tabasco, the last port city on the Mexican Gulf Coast.	(A)
Battle of Las Vegas	July 6	New Mexican insurgents and the United States soldiers fight at Las Vegas, New Mexico.	(A)
Battle of Cienega Creek	July 9	New Mexicans and United States forces clash near Taos, New Mexico.	(A)
Battle of Contreras (also known as Battle of Padierna)	August 19	Santa Anna fails to support the Mexican line at a critical moment; turns victory into a rout.	(A)
Battle of Churubusco	August 20	Regular Mexican troops and Saint Patrick's Battalion under Manuel Rincón hold a fortified monastery against Winfield Scott; just over half of the San Patricios are killed or captured, the rest retreat with the rest of the Mexican forces in the area.	(A)
Battle of Molino del Rey	September 8	U.S. forces lose nearly 800 men in an attempt to take a suspected cannon foundry: "They fell in platoons and companies."	(A)
Battle of Chapultepec	September 13	Scott assaults Chapultepec Castle. Los Niños Héroes pass into legend. Some captured San Patricio's members were executed after the U.S. raised its flag over the castle.	(A)
Battle for Mexico City	September 13/14	Fierce fighting for Mexico City.	(A)
Siege of Puebla	September 14	Mexican Light Corps forces under General Joaquín Rea begin the siege of Puebla.	(A)
Fall of Mexico City	September 15	U.S. forces enter Mexico City.	(A)
Battle of Mulegé	October 2	Mexican forces led by Captain Manuel Pineda defeated a small detachment of U.S. forces at Mulegé, Baja California Sur.	(M)
Battle of Huamantla	October 9	A relief force under the command of General Joseph Lane marching to relieve Puebla defeated the Mexican reinforcements moving to Puebla under the command of General Santa Anna.	(A)
Siege of Puebla	October 12	General Lane's U.S. relief column reaches Puebla, Siege of Puebla lifted. Skirmishes with Light Corps skirmishers and snipers as Lane's forces entered the city.	(A)
Action of Atlixco	October 19	Also known as the "Atlixco Affair", fought at Atlixco between Mexican Light Corps forces under Gen. Rea and U.S. forces under Gen. Joseph Lane.	(A)
Bombardment of Guaymas	October 19/20	Threat of bombardment of the fort and city of Guaymas, Sonora, by the 2 ships of Captain Elie A. F. La Vallette led to the secret evacuation of the Mexican garrison and artillery on the night of 19 November by Col. Antonio Campuzano. Following the morning bombardment of the fort and city, La Vallette landed to take possession, to find the city abandoned by its defenders and most of its population.	(A)
Bombardment of Punta Sombrero	October 31	United States Navy schooner Libertad silences Mexican shore batteries at Punta Sombrero, defending the anchorage of Mulege, Baja California Sur, on the Gulf of California.	(A)
Occupation of Mazatlán	November 11	With the guns of a U.S. Squadron under Commodore William Branford Shubrick trained on the city, a landing force of 730 marines, sailors, and guns summoned Mazatlán to surrender, its garrison evacuated the previous night, the city capitulated and was occupied and held to the end of the war.	(A)
Battle of La Paz	November 16/17	Mexicans under Manuel Pineda were defeated in an attack on the American garrison at La Paz, Baja California Sur	(A)
Affair at Guaymas	November 17	An attempt to reoccupy Guaymas, Sonora, by Col. Antonio Campuzano was repulsed by a landing party of sailors and marines under Lieutenant W. T. Smith, supported by the guns of the USS Dale.	(A)
Skirmishes of Palos Prietos and Urias	November 19/20	A U.S. force from Mazatlán, attempting to link up with a naval landing force to break up the close blockade of Mazatlán fought a skirmish at Palos Prietos. The Naval landing force from Mazatlán linked up with the land force after a hard-fought skirmish with Mexican marines at Urias, to break up the close blockade of Mazatlán.	(A)
Battle of San José del Cabo	November 20/21	Mexicans under José Antonio Mijares defeated by U.S. forces at San José del Cabo	(A)
Skirmish at Matamoros	November 23	American force under Gen. Lane surprised and defeated the Mexican garrison at Izúcar de Matamoros, capturing or destroying the materiel at the depot of Gen. Rea's Light Corps that was in the town.	(A)
Affair at Galaxara Pass	November 24	Mexican Light Corps cavalry under Gen. Rea was defeated after they blocked the withdrawal to Puebla of the U.S. forces under Gen. Lane at Galaxara Pass, after their successful attack on Izúcar de Matamoros.	(A)
Siege of La Paz	November 27/December 8	A second Mexican attack by Manuel Pineda on La Paz, Baja California Sur, ending in a U.S. victory.	(A)
Action of San Sebastián	December 13	U.S. Naval landing force making a night march from Mazatlán surprised and routed an entrenched post of Mexican cavalry at San Sebastián, breaking the blockade of Mazatlan.	(A)

== 1848 ==
Battle	Date	Engagement remarks	Result
Capture of San Blas	January 11	An unopposed landing party under Lieutenant Frederick Chatard, captured the coastal fort and brought off two pieces of artillery and two schooners, one belonging to the custom-house. With no force sufficient to defend it and the port made defenseless, no American occupation of the city took place.	(A)
Landing at Manzanillo	January 18	Lieutenant Chatard landed a small party at Manzanillo, Colima, and spiked three large guns defending the port, rendering it defenseless.	(A)
Siege of San José del Cabo	January 22/February 14	A Mexican siege of San José del Cabo that failed when the garrison with a U.S. Navy landing force attacked together to break it up.	(A)
Skirmish at Cochori	January 30	Fabius Stanley's surprise descent on the camp at the village of Cochori held by Mexican forces blockading Guaymas.	(A)
Skirmish at Bocachicacampo	February 13	Fabius Stanley's surprise night naval landing and assault against Campuzano's main camp blockading Guaymas, at Bocachicacampo.	(A)
Action of Sequalteplan	February 25	An American force under Gen. Lane defeated a Mexican guerrilla force under Padre Jarauta at Zacualtipan	(A)
Truce of March 6, 1848	March 6	Truce ordered the official end of hostilities between Mexico and the United States, awaiting the ratification of the Treaty of Guadalupe Hidalgo. From January to August Mexican partisans continued to resist the U.S. Army of Occupation. Formal fighting, however, had ceased by the terms of the truce on March 6, 1848. This truce also ended attacks by guerrilla units under the control of the government. Rebellious guerrilla units continued until the end of the American occupation in July or, like that of Padre Jaruta, until crushed by the Mexican Army, as it was obligated to do under terms of the truce.	(-)
Battle of Santa Cruz de Rosales	March 16	Sterling Price advances into Chihuahua after the Treaty of Guadalupe Hidalgo was signed. He captured Chihuahua after being told by the Mexican Governor Angel Trias that the Truce of March 6 was already signed. Price followed the Mexican garrison that fell back to Santa Cruz de Rosales and defeated it, before getting word from his chain of command of the cessation of hostilities.	(A)
Skirmish of Todos Santos	March 31	The culminating clash of Lt. Col. Henry S. Burton's campaign that defeated Mexican forces in Baja California Sur and subsequently dispersed them, after the Treaty of Guadalupe Hidalgo, and the truce of March 6, was already signed.	(A)

== See also ==
- James Polk
- Mexican–American War campaigns
- List of United States military and volunteer units in the Mexican–American War

== Notes ==
  - Combined official Mexican losses and the US estimates Northern Campaign (Palo Alto-Buena Vista): c. 1,031 Mexican killed. Valley Campaign (Cerro Gordo-Mexico City): c. 2,854 Mexican were killed. Or, c. 3,885 not including later died of wounds, died from disease, or the losses in the West.
    - The Mexican Cavalry Division (Army of the South) escaped the Valley Campaign largely intact (4,000 evacuated Mexico City). Of some 16,000 Infantry of the Armies of the East & North, only 5,000 evacuated Mexico City.
