= Affair at Galaxara Pass =

1847 event in the Mexican–American War

Coordinates: 18°40′14″N 98°26′43″W

- Part of the Mexican–American War
Date	November 24, 1847
Location	Galaxara Pass, Puebla
Result	American victory

Belligerents
United States	Mexico

Commanders and leaders
Joseph Lane	Joaquín Rea

Strength
135 Texas Rangers, Texas Mounted Riflemen and Louisiana Dragoons, 25 artillerymen and 1 gun, 21 freed American soldiers	700 cavalry of the Light Corps.

Casualties and losses
2 killed and 2 slightly wounded.	Uncertain but not less than fifty killed and wounded.

Affair at Galaxara Pass, November 24, 1847, was a U.S. Army victory of Gen. Joseph Lane, over the Mexican Army Light Corps, an irregular force under Gen. Joaquín Rea. The Light Corps had been the principal force harassing the U.S. Army line of communications on the National Road during Scott's campaign against Mexico City during the Mexican–American War. Following Lane's relief of the Siege of Puebla he moved against the Light Corps to end that threat.

== Background ==
After their defeat at Atlixco by General Lane a month earlier, the Light Corps of Gen. Joaquín Rea had retreated to Izúcar de Matamoros, more distant from the American garrison at Puebla and continued harassing the U.S. Army line of communications on the National Road between Vera Cruz and Mexico City. General Lane decided to strike again at Rea, and ordered a night march to surprise the garrison at his base at Izúcar de Matamoros. Surprise complete the Skirmish at Matamoros was extremely successful, killing many of the enemy, dispersing the rest and capturing and destroying tons of arms and material belonging to the Light Corps.

== Battle ==
Early on the morning of November 24, 1847, General Lane's command moved off on their return march to Puebla, with 25 or 30 men of Captain Robert's company of Texas mounted riflemen in the advanced guard. The remainder of the Riflemen followed the artillery and a small train of four wagons, containing property captured the day before, drawn mules and driven by Mexican drivers. The Louisiana Dragoons were the rear guard.

As they moved northward though the difficult road through the long Galaxara Pass, five miles north of Izúcar de Matamoros the train became spread out along the road. General Lane fell back to get it moving and close up the column, shortly thereafter a report came that Mexican cavalry had appeared to their front.

General Lane ordered Colonel Hays to the head of the column to engage the enemy with the advance guard. When the Colonel arrived he found a small party of the advance guard being chased back to the American column by two hundred Mexican lancers. Hays promptly charged the advancing Mexicans with Captain Roberts' company, and Lieutenants Ridgely, Whipple, Waters, McDonald, Blake, and General Lane's private secretary, Mr. Phelps, 35 men in all. Their charge broke the lancers and Hays' detachment then pursued the lancers back across the plain and up a steep slope toward the mountains, from which they had originally come. The Mexican Lancers attempted to rally but were broken buy the continuing charge by Hays and his men, and fell back over the summit of the mountain. Hays continued in close pursuit where they found the defeated lancers being reinforced by the main body of the Light Corps, 500 lancers under their commander General Joaquin Rea.

At this point in the contest, the revolvers and rifles of the mounted riflemen had all been discharged in the advance and none had sabres. In the face of the disadvantage of numbers and weaponry, Hays ordered his force to retire to their original position. Despite being charged by four or five hundred lancers, Hays’ men retired in good order to their original position, recharged their weapons and repulsed the charge. They held their position until the artillery and the Dragoons came up under Captain Lewis. The artillery was unlimbered. When the lancers then retired to the mountains several rounds of grape shot and canister persuaded them to disappear from sight.

During the engagement, no longer guarded by American soldiers, the Mexican drivers cut the mules from the wagons and escaped with them. The captured property with no means of transport was destroyed with the exception of the sabres, which were distributed to the mounted men, the remainder destroyed.

For several hours after the engagement the Mexican lancers shadowed the march of Lane's command. They kept their distance, too far from the Americans to charge or shoot at, despite some attempts to do so by the riflemen and artillery.

The Americans lost 2 men killed and 2 slightly wounded all in Hays' charge. One of the killed was Lieutenant Ridgely, Lane's acting assistant adjutant general, who was mortally wounded while charging with his comrades by the side of Colonel Hays. The other killed was a Texas Ranger, William Malpass, who also fell in the charge. Several men were mentioned in the report for distinction in the action, among them Private Glanton, of the Texan rangers, who "attracted general notice for his extraordinary activity and daring throughout the actions both of the 23d and 24th." The Mexicans loss was not accurately known by the Americans, but Lane wrote in his report that it:

could not have been less than fifty killed and wounded. Of the killed, were two captains, one lieutenant, and also three noncommissioned officers of artillery.

This engagement was a clear illustration of the advantage repeating firearms gave mounted troops over those with single shot firearms and hand held weapons.

== Aftermath ==
Lane's column marched on through the night arriving at Atlixco, about ten o'clock of the morning of the 25th. After four hours of sleep the column moved off to Puebla, where they arrived at two o'clock in the afternoon with no further incidents. Their raid on Matamoros, the subsequent battle in the pass and their return were accomplished within sixty hours. Lane's raid had effectively negated the danger of the Light Corps to the American line of communications for the rest of the war.

== Battle site today ==
The site of the Galaxara Pass battlefield is now partly occupied by the town called La Galarza, in the Municipality of Izúcar de Matamoros, in the State of Puebla.

== See also ==
- Battles of the Mexican–American War
