= Acatlán de Osorio =

City in the Mexican state of Puebla

- City and municipality
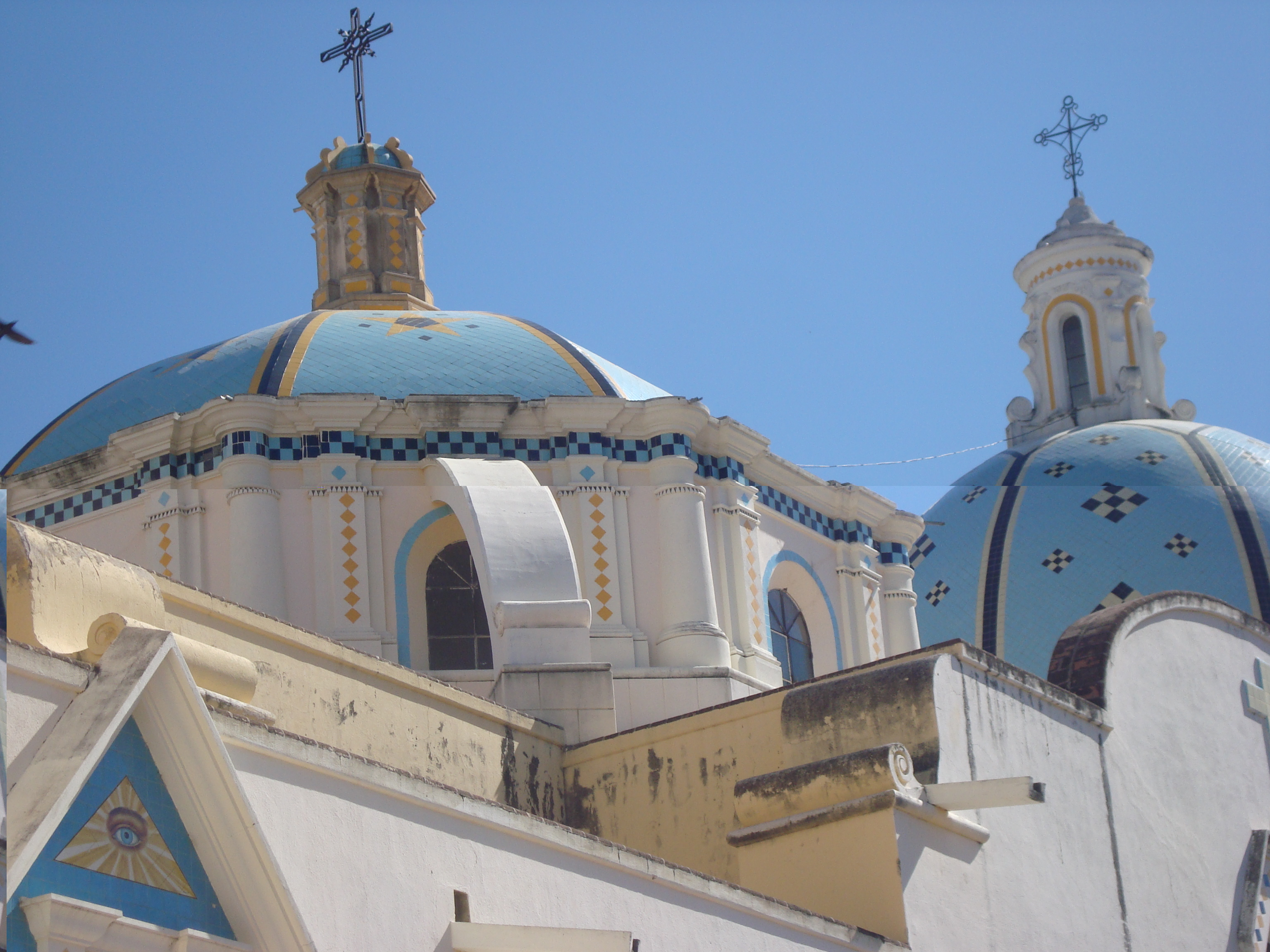
- Domes in Acatlán

- Coat of arms

- Location within Puebla (state) Location within Mexico
- Coordinates: 18°12′31″N 98°03′27″W
- Country: Mexico
- State: Puebla

Population (2020)
  - Total: 19,341
  - Municipality: 37,955

Acatlán de Osorio is a city in the Mexican state of Puebla. The shortened name Acatlán, is commonly used to refer to the municipality of which it is the seat, and to the city itself. It is at an elevation of 1,213 m (3,981 ft). In the 2020 census, the population of the city was 19,341.

== Name ==
The name "Acatlán" comes from a combination of two Nahuatl words: acatl, for "cane" or "reed", and tlan, for "together" or "close". The name Osorio was in honor of Don Joaquín Osorio.

== History ==
The Mixtecs who ruled this area prior to the Spanish incursion called it Yucuyuxi or Yuta Tisaha. Acatlán was the capital of a strategic province of the Aztec Empire after being conquered by Moctezuma I, and its rulers were related those of the Mexica. It sent gifts of mantas and rabbit skins to Tenochtitlan and received gifts in return, and every 80 days, two nobles were sent along with their wives to serve in the royal palace. Although mainly inhabited by Mixtecs, the town had a Nahua minority. Salt and cochineal dye were important local products. Acatlan fought wars with Itzocan (now Izúcar de Matamoros), Tepexic, Piaxtla and Petlalcingo. In New Spain, Acatlán was the seat of the alcaldía mayor Acatlán y Piastla.

The modern city of Acatlán was founded on January 6, 1712, and built on the ruins of a town destroyed by an earthquake in 1711. It attained city status on April 3, 1883.

== Sources ==
- Sánchez Rubio, Miguel Ángel. La Mejor Pagina Web de ciudad de Acatlan (Archived October 24, 2009) (Retrieved September 19, 2006).
