= Handcrafts and folk art in Puebla =

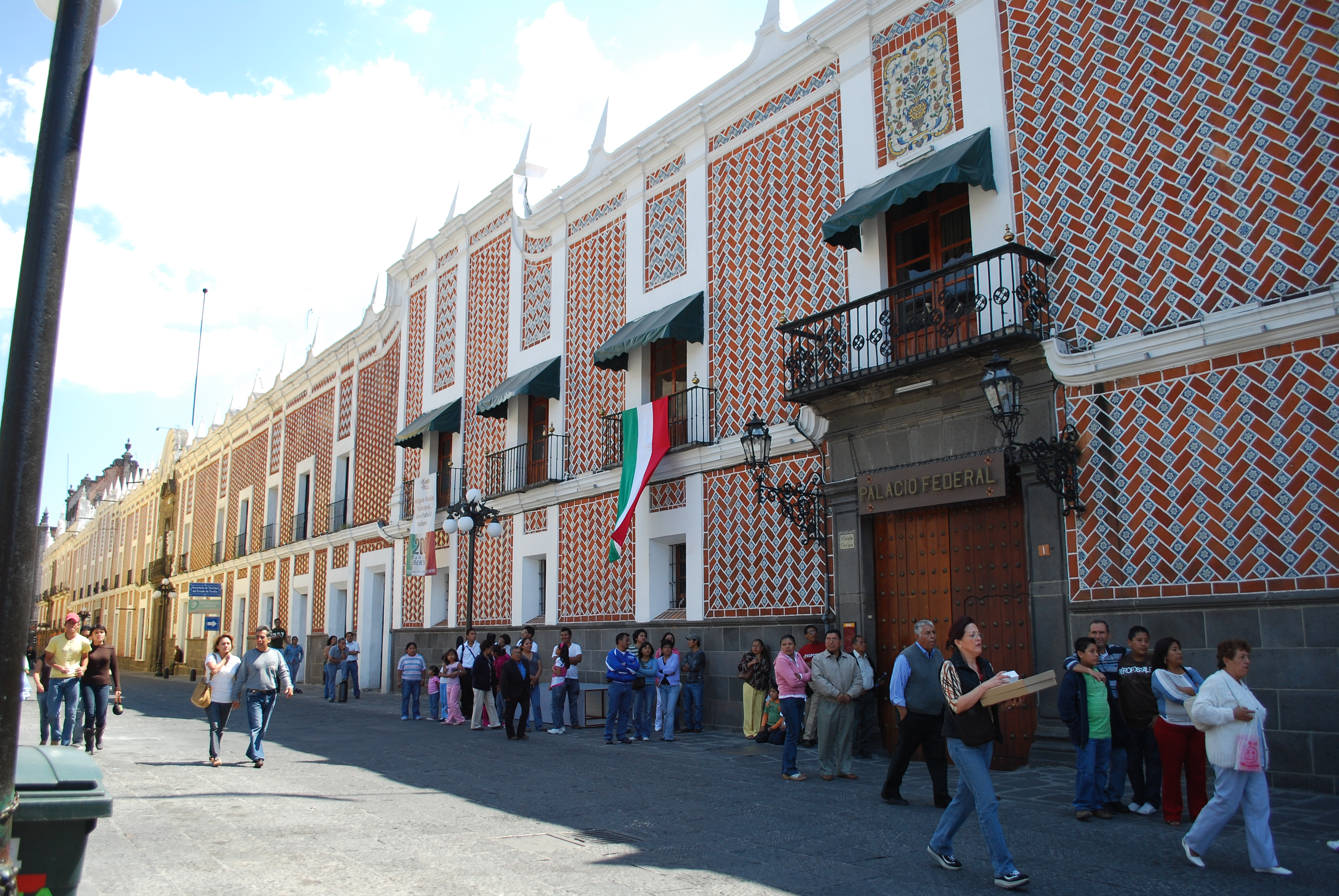
Buildings with ceramic tiles in the city of Puebla

Puebla handcrafts and folk art is handcraft and folk art from the Mexican state of Puebla. The best-known craft of Puebla is Talavera pottery—which is the only mayolica style pottery continuously produced in Mexico since it was introduced in the early colonial period. Other notable handcraft traditions include trees of life from Izúcar de Matamoros and amate (bark) paper made by the very small town of San Pablito in the north of the state. The state also makes glass, Christmas tree ornaments, indigenous textiles, monumental clocks, baskets, and apple cider.

== History ==
Handcraft traditions of the state are a mixture of indigenous and European. These traditions can be viewed as two main types: those that retain most of their indigenous quality, and those heavily European in design or technique. Indigenous-style products include certain pottery traditions, textiles, and the making of amate (bark) paper. European styles include Talavera pottery and glass.

== Pottery ==
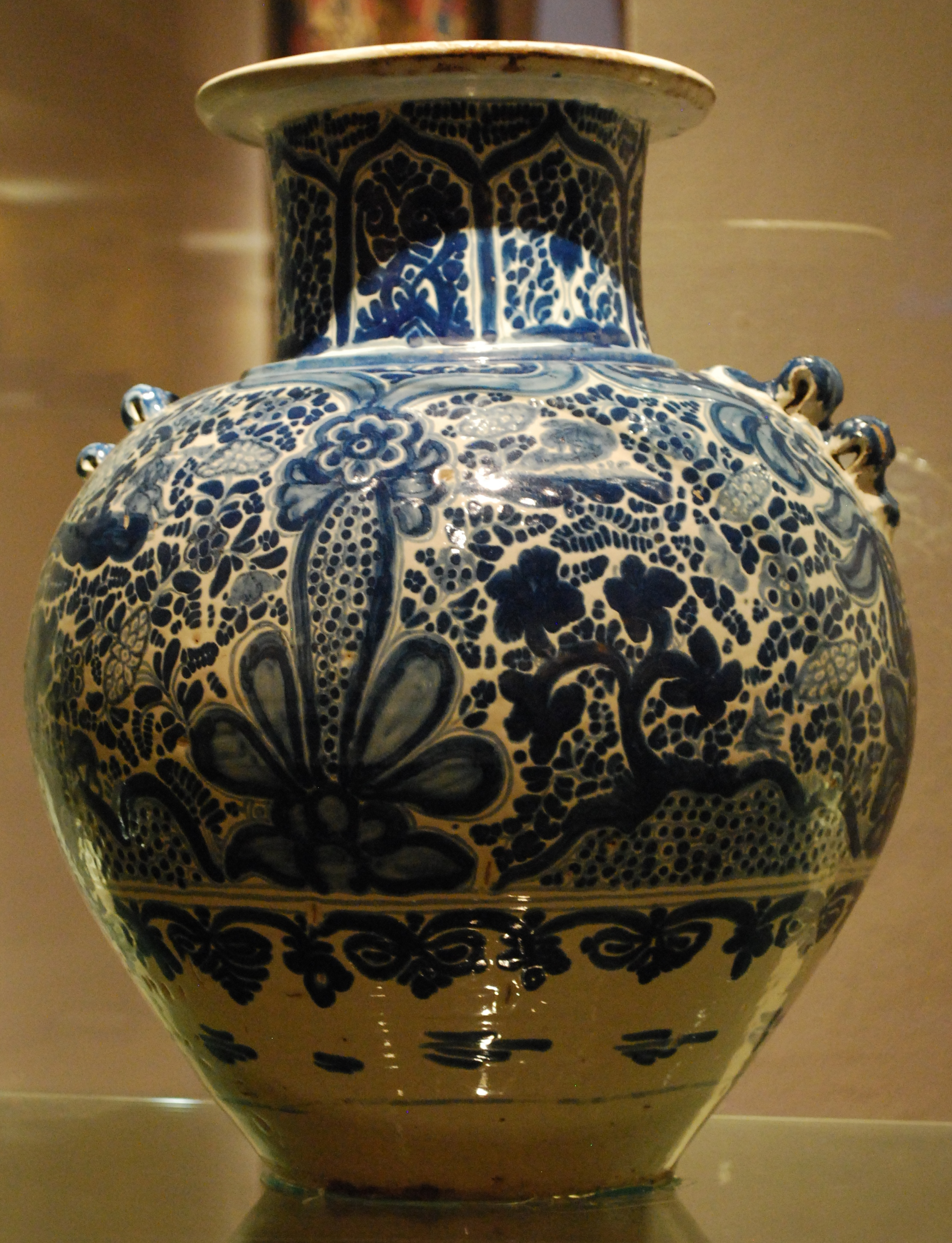
19th century Talavera piece on display at the Franz Mayer Museum in Mexico City

Glazed, double-fired pottery called mayolica was introduced to Mexico from Spain between 1550 and 1585, and was produced in various areas during the colonial period. However, only in Puebla has it been made continuously to the present.

The best known pottery of this type is called Talavera, named after the white background ceramics of Talavera de la Reina, Spain, which it sought to imitate. Like its namesake, Puebla Talavera is characterized by a white background, achieved with tin salts, and mostly blue decorative features using cobalt salts. It has been used to make vases, china, sculpted figures, and tiles. White with blue only as decoration is the most traditional but there are other colors that are accepted as well. The blue decoration of Puebla Talavera is both from east and west. Glazed ceramic was invented in Asia and came to Mexico via Europe, specifically Spain. However, there is also direct Asian influence on the work because of the Oriental goods that came to the country on the Manila Galleon. The use of talavera and other tiles also distinguishes Puebla architecture, being found on facades of major buildings all over the state.

A number of other communities have lesser-known pottery traditions. The best known of these is that of Izúcar de Matamoros, whose main product are a traditional sculpted work called a tree of life. These are distinctly decorated from the better-known trees of Metepec, State of Mexico. The best known artisan of this tradition is Alfonso Castillo Orta, who won the National Prize of Arts and Sciences in folk art in 1996. The family continues to make the trees and other figures such as those of La Catrina, those for nativity scenes, Frida Kahlo, and more. The Castillo family’s work has garnered awards both in Mexico and abroad, and are found in noted collections such as that of the royal family of Spain.

Common pottery item include large pots and casseroles used for cooking traditional dishes such as rice and mole poblano. These pieces are glazed on the interior, with the outside decorated with black and or pastillaje (small bits of clay rolled into designs). Most of the pottery is made in the city of Puebla, especially in the Barrio de la Luz neighborhood. This kind of pottery-making remains a viable occupation because of the creativity and organization of the artisans who work principally to make large size cooking utensils. Production can be highly specialized among artisans, with those dedicated to different aspects of the process such as molding and firing. The making of these utensils survives because traditional rural cooking techniques still survive in many parts of the state, where meals are prepared in clay pots over wood fires, especially for major festivities and celebrations.

These are also made in the town of Amozoc de Mota, to the east of the city of Puebla, where being a member of an artisan family still carries some prestige. The town makes two kinds of pottery, kitchen utensils, and pots—and two kinds of decorative animal and human figures: those used in sets such as for nativity scenes, and miniature skulls. Much of the kitchenware is large pots and casseroles for preparing mole poblano—and sometimes also used for adobo, pipian, or tinga. Other are for making rice or bean dishes. Pots include those for making atole and other hot beverages, and for making traditional piñatas. The work is divided by sex and age in artisan families, usually directed by a male. Families make the greenware and sell the pieces to those who fire them, who in turn sell them to middlemen. Most are sold locally and in the central eastern region of Mexico where Puebla is located.

Both the Barrio de la Luz and Amozoc communities also make ritual items such as incense burners, candle holders, and containers—which are generally covered in a black glaze and most often used for Day of the Dead decoration.

Acatlán traditionally makes unglazed clay toys. However, the work of pottery Herón Martínez in the 20th century has promoted the creation of larger sculpted pieces.

== Textiles ==
Puebla has had a history of industrial textile making, but the hand-made ones remain important, especially culturally. Rebozos and quechquemitls are important items in traditional indigenous dress. One particular tradition is the making of black wool rebozos, richly decorated with multicolored animal and flower designs that predate the Conquest. These originally had religious significance but have mostly been lost.

Acaxochitlan is a traditional Nahua community noted for its textiles. They sell various types of garments, mostly on the nearby highway. Some products are made on backstrap looms, and most are embroidered. These garments are distinctive to the community, often with multicolored birds and mythological figures. Makers also decorate garments with small beads.

Santa Anita is known for weaving wrap skirts.

== Amate ==
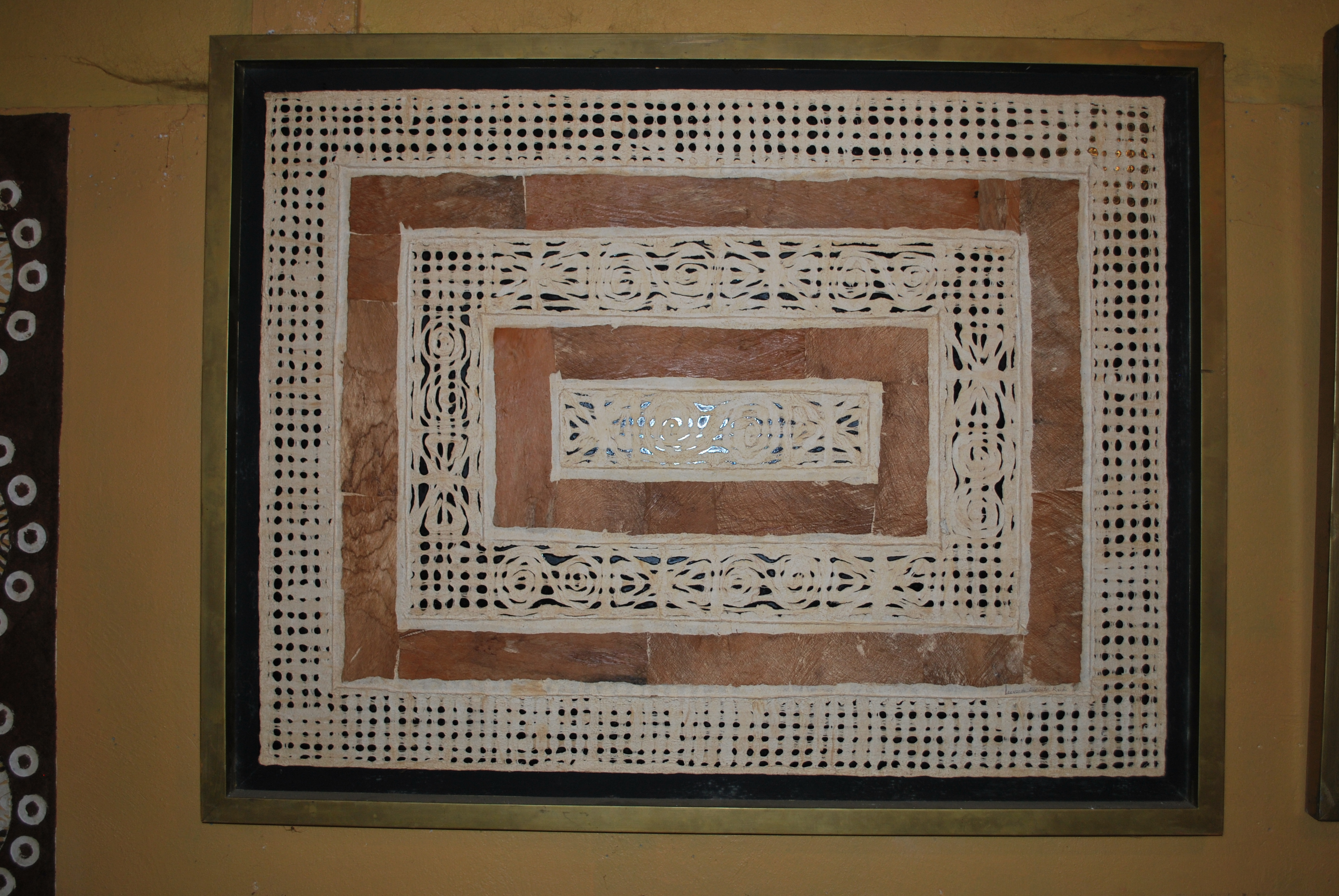
Amate paper wall hanging from San Pablito

Amate paper is made in the small village of San Pablito, Pahuatlan in the Sierra Norte de Puebla. The paper dates from the pre Hispanic era, when the Aztecs used it for codices and ritual use. The making of the paper survived in this remote area for ritual purposes, making cut-out figures. The most important traditional use for this paper was the making of cut-out figures for religious and magical ceremonies. Today, most is made for sale to other indigenous artisans who use it to paint images in Amayaltepec, San Agustin de las Flores, and various communities in the state of Guerrero. The town has less than five thousand inhabitants but is the main amate paper producer in the country. It is made in family workshops, where the bark fiber is pounded daily.

The chemicals used in making the paper is causing environmental problems, such as pollution in the nearby Cazones River. It has caused a depletion of the trees needed to provide the bark.

== Glass ==
Glass work in Mexico began in Puebla with the first glass kiln documented at 1542, before spreading to other areas such as Mexico City and Guadalajara. Initially, the production was utilitarian containers. Production in Puebla mostly consisted of pressed glass, of which little remains. A wide array of drinking glasses and commercial containers were made, especially those for pulque. However, this has all but disappeared because of competition from industrial glass as well as the decrease in the consumption of pulque.

Most handcrafted glass production today is blown glass, with some pressed glass is used to make miniatures. One notable glass product are glass spheres to decorate Christmas trees. The best known community for this is Chignahuapan, a small town in the Sierra Norte region, surrounded by pine trees. The craft became established here when Rafael Mendez from Tlalpujahua, Michoacan, set up shop in 1970. Today, this workshop employs about 100 people. The spheres are blown glass coated on the inside with silver nitrate, then handpainted on the outside. Sizes ranges from tiny spheres sold as earrings, to very large singular pieces displayed on its own wood base selling for about 2,000 pesos each. Expert painters can do thousands spheres a day, depending on the design used. While painted spheres dominate, other Christmas tree ornaments such as glass in other shapes (e.g., piñatas, fruit, and human figures), and those with pine branches, ixtle and wood are also made.

The town has about 450 family workshops and six small factories, which make the community the number one producer of Christmas ornaments in the country. The town holds an annual fair dedicated to the craft at the end of October to the beginning of November. The fair attracts visitors from Mexico and abroad, mostly from the United States and Spain, and business people interested in export. Some artisans make different designs for display year-round, for other seasons, for social events, and as personalized trinkets. One of the newer designs are clear spheres filled with feathers, or notes with words such as “love” and “peace.”

== Other traditions ==
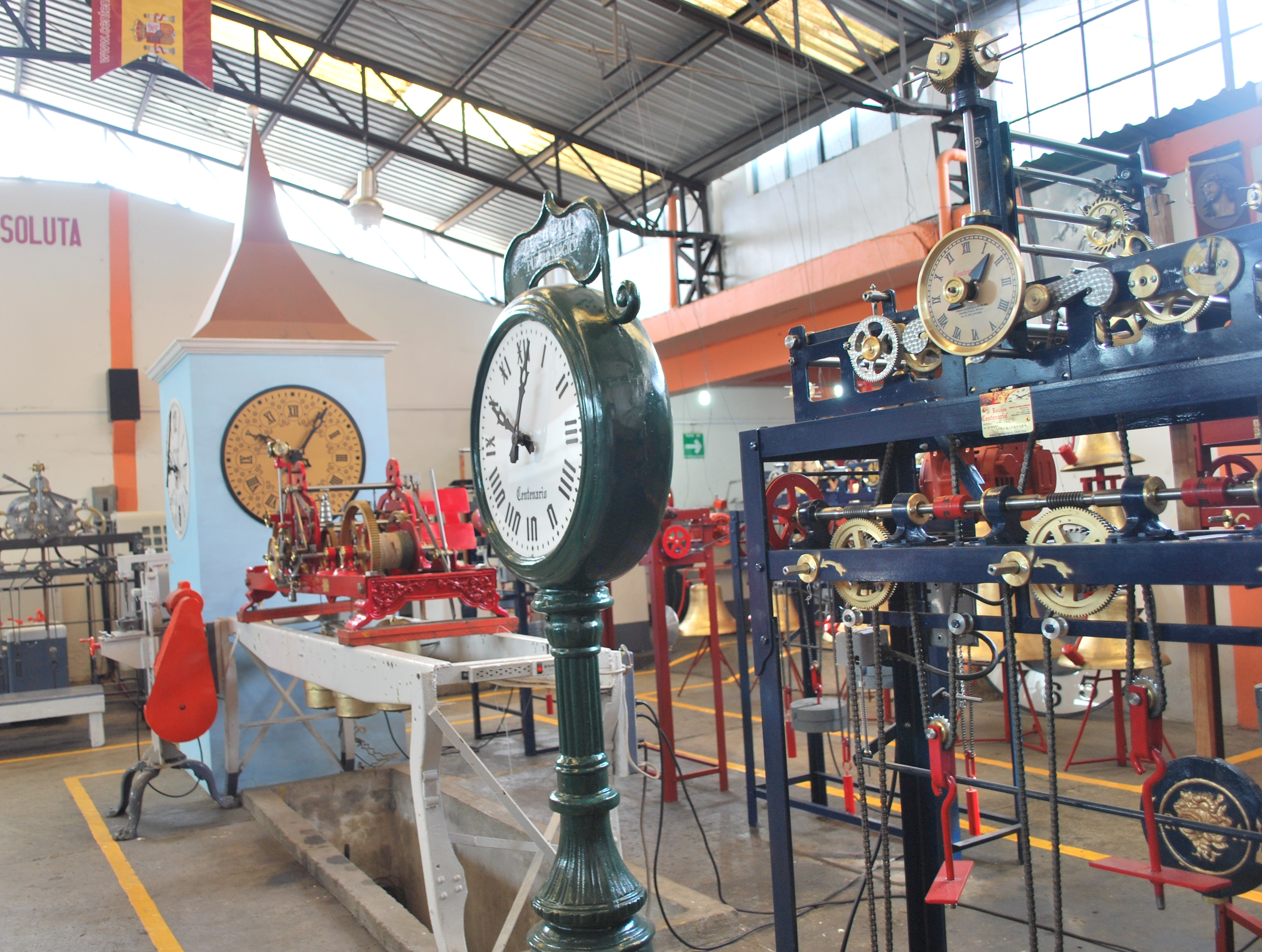
Inside the Centenario clock works in Zacalán

Other handcrafts are related to construction, such as stone quarrying and artistic wrought iron—both important to colonial and colonial-style buildings. Onyx is a commonly worked stone, not only for construction, but also for the making of decorative objects such as boxes, lamps, book holders, and tables. Other objects made with this material include drinking glasses and jewelry.

Zacatlán is home to a monumental clock works, where each piece is made to order in a small factory. Centenario clocks began when Alberto Olvera Hernández began building them in his father’s woodshop, located outside the town, even making his own tools. After making several as a hobby, he opened a workshop in town, which became the first of its kind in Latin America. Today Centenario is known for making monumental clocks for towers, churches, public buildings—and “flower” clocks, where vegetation provides the face. These clocks can be found in most parts of Mexico and some abroad as well. The business remains family owned, with about fifty employees.

Amozoc is noted for silver-inlaid iron work, which is almost entirely dedicated to the production of gear for charros such as spurs, stirrups, buttons for charro suits, and pistol butts. While charro as a working profession has waned, charro associations and competitions continue as a cultural activity.

Santa María Chigmecatitlán is a Mixtec community in southern Puebla that is noted for its basketry, especially the making of miniature figures with palm fronds. While the town has woven palm for many years, only after 1965 did miniatures become popular, mostly due to demand from tourists and handcraft retailers. Acaxochitlan is also known for basketry, making floor coverings, petates, and other types of mats.

Apple cider in Mexico is mostly drunk for the Christmas and New Year’s holidays. It is generally sweet, mildy alcoholic, and carbonated. The most famous variety is made in and around the town Huejotzingo, which hosts an annual cider and handcrafts Fair. It is made with locally grown apples and comes in two varieties: rose (mixed with red wine) and natural. It is sold in various parts of the country. Cider and fruit wines are commonly made in small enterprises in the north of the state, in communities such as Acaxochitlan, which makes one wine from a local fruit called acachul. The Copa de Oro cider enterprise in Huejotzingo hosts a museum dedicated to cider making in Puebla, especially to the history of the enterprise, with photographs, documents, and keepsakes.

== Notable artisans ==
- Uriarte Talavera
- Esther Medina Hernández
- Maximo Gómez Ponce
- Cesar Torres Ramírez
- Ignacio Peralta Soledad
- Alfonso Castillo Orta
- Rodolfo Villena Hernández
- Pineda Palacios family
