= Skirmish at Matamoros =

- Part of the Mexican–American War
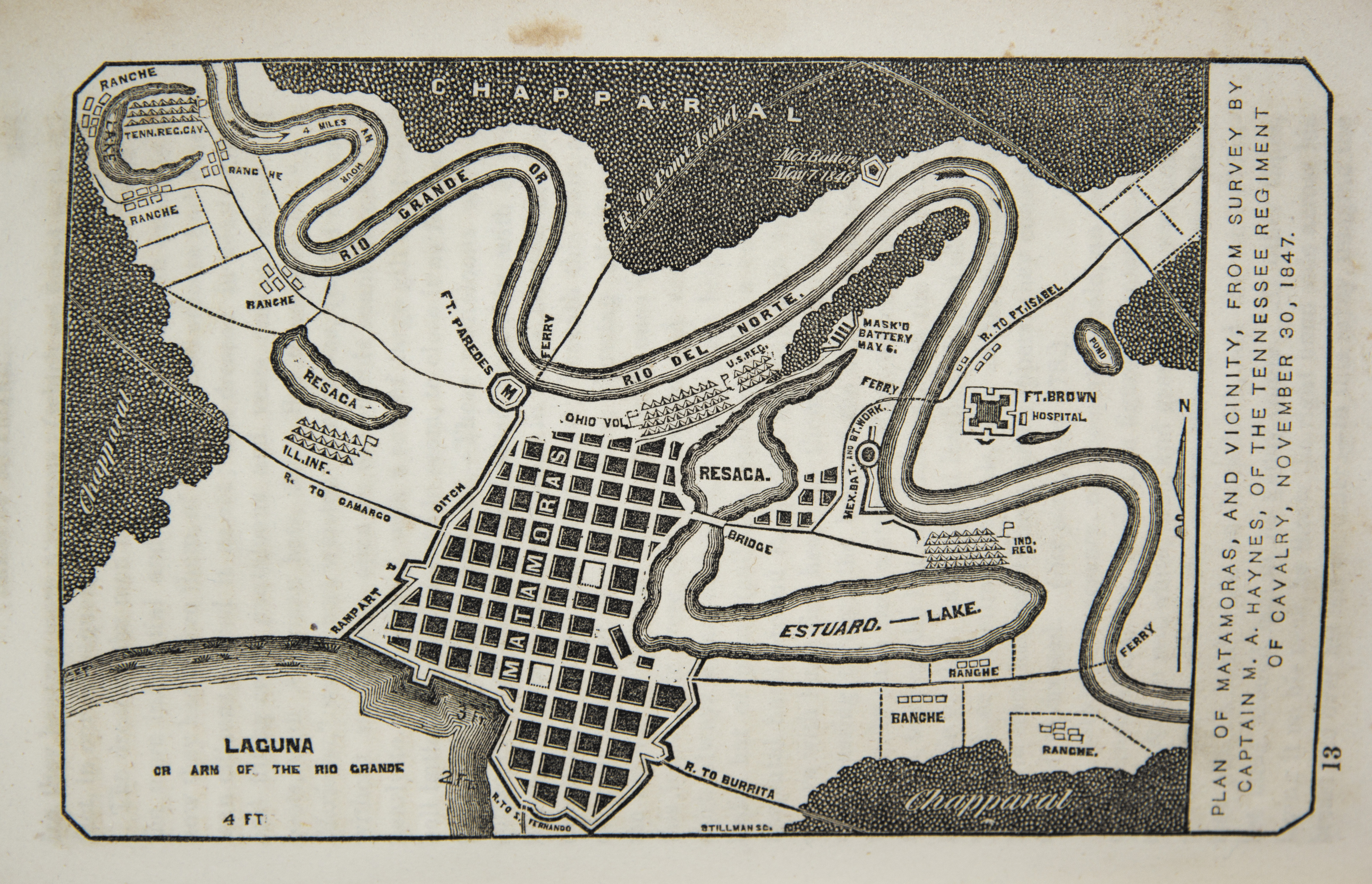
- Plan of Matamoras, and vicinity (November 30, 1847)
Date	November 23, 1847
Location	Izúcar de Matamoros, Puebla
Result	American victory

Belligerents
United States	Mexico

Commanders and leaders
Gen. Joseph Lane	Colonel Piedras

Strength
135 mounted riflemen and dragoons, 25 artillerymen and 1 gun	400–600 men

Casualties and losses
3 soldiers killed, 1 American citizen killed 5 wounded	60–80 killed or wounded
- 21 U.S. Soldiers freed, large amounts of munitions captured or destroyed

The Skirmish at Matamoros on November 23, 1847, was a U.S. victory of Gen. Joseph Lane, over a detachment under Colonel Piedras guarding the depot of the Mexican Army Light Corps that had been harassing the U.S. Army line of communications on the National Road under Gen. Joaquín Rea late in the Mexican–American War.

== March to Izucar de Matamoros and surprise attack ==
A night march in the rain from Puebla brought General Lane's force to the outskirts of Izucar de Matamoros, early in the morning. Lane quickly launched an attack, surprising and routing the guards at an outpost there. The surprised guards fled into the town with the Texan riflemen and Louisiana Dragoons in hot pursuit. Bursting into the town, a "short and sanguinary action" made the main body of troops flee and disperse into a forest on the far side of town leaving Gen. Lane in possession of the place and its depot, having suffered no casualties. 60 to 80 Mexicans were killed or wounded in the engagement, including the commander of the place, Colonel Piedras.

21 captured American soldiers were freed and armed with muskets, and mounted on horses captured from the enemy. At the depot they captured 3 artillery pieces, twelve boxes of ammunition, five hundred muskets, five hundred sabres which they had transport to take away. They spent the rest of the day resting and destroying the remaining twelve tons of shot, large amounts of bullets, matches, medical stores, and other public property from the depot. Three men were injured in an accident destroying the material.

== Aftermath ==
Lane returned to Puebla the next day but was intercepted on the way, by a larger force under Gen. Rea in the Pass of Galaxara. Lane had to fight his way through in the Affair at Galaxara Pass. The raid had destroyed the material needed to support an effective offensive by the Light Corps, rendering it a minor nuisance for the rest of the war.

== See also ==
- Battles of the Mexican–American War
