= Tunis Craven =

Tunis Augustus Macdonough Craven
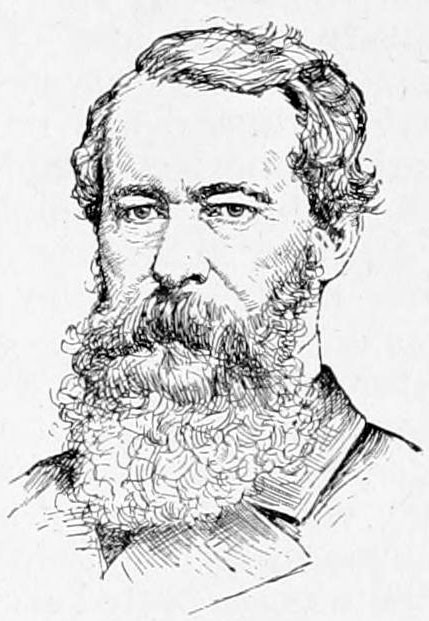
- Born: January 11, 1813; Portsmouth, New Hampshire
- Died: August 5, 1864 (aged 51); Battle of Mobile Bay
- Military career
- Allegiance: United States
- Branch: United States Navy
- Service years: 1829–1864
- Rank: Commander
- Commands: USS Libertad; USS Corwin; USS Mohawk; USS Crusader; USS Tuscarora; USS Tecumseh
- Conflicts: Mexican–American War; American Civil War

Signature
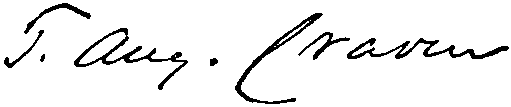

Tunis Augustus Macdonough Craven (11 January 1813 – 5 August 1864) was an officer in the United States Navy. His career included service in the Mexican–American War and the American Civil War.

== Early life ==
Tunis Augustus Macdonough Craven was born in Portsmouth, New Hampshire, January 11, 1813. He was the youngest son of Tunis Craven, a Naval Storekeeper, stationed at the Portsmouth Yard, and his wife, Hannah Tingey, daughter of Commodore Thomas Tingey, a longtime commandant of the Washington Navy Yard. His brother, Thomas Tingey Craven would also join the navy, rising to the rank of rear admiral, while another brother, Alfred Wingate Craven (1810–1879), became a noted civil engineer.

In his youth he attended the Columbia College Grammar School in New York, his father having removed his family to Brooklyn, when ordered to duty in the New York Yard. February 2, 1829, Craven was appointed an acting midshipman from New York (warranted November 18, 1831), and was attached to the Boston and St. Louis.

== U.S. Navy service ==
Promoted to passed midshipman in September 1835, he was on duty in the United States Coast Survey almost continually until 1843, nearly two years after his promotion to lieutenant, in September 1841. In 1838 he married Mary Carter, a member of one of the oldest and most influential families on Long Island, who died in 1843, leaving three children. The same year, Lieutenant Craven was ordered to the receiving ship at New York, where he remained until ordered to the Dale in May, 1846. In the meantime, he had married again and moved from Brooklyn to Bound Brook, New Jersey. His second wife was Marie L. Stevenson, of Baltimore, Maryland, with whom he had three children. Craven served on the Dale during the Mexican–American War with the Pacific Squadron. He was given command of the chartered schooner Libertad in 1847, patrolling the coast of Baja California Sur to intercept Mexican ships trying to bring men and military material to their army in the territory. In the Bombardment of Punta Sombrero, Craven engaged in a gun duel with a shore battery guarding the anchorage of Mulege.

After his return from duty on the Dale, he was employed on U.S. Coast Survey duty until 1859, with the exception of a year at the United States Naval Observatory in 1850. Most of this time, he commanded the steamer Corwin, but in October 1857, sailed in the Varina in command of the Atrato Expedition, which was for the purpose of surveying a route for a proposed ship canal through the Isthmus of Darien (now called the Isthmus of Panama) by way of the Atrato River.

In 1859 Lieutenant Craven was given command of the steamer Mohawk, Home Squadron, in which he captured two slavers; in 1860 he saved the crew of the Bella, a foundering Spanish vessel, for which he was given a gold medal and diploma by Queen Isabella II. About the same time, the New York Board of Underwriters presented Mrs. Craven with a silver service for efficient services rendered to merchant vessels at sea by her husband.

In 1861 Lieutenant Craven was ordered to take command of the Crusader, Home Squadron, but was shortly after promoted to commander and given command of the Tuscarora, special service. The Tuscarora went to England with orders to report to the U.S. Minister, Mr. Adams. While in Southampton, the Confederate steamer CSS Nashville came in; but after she departed, the Tuscarora had to wait 24 hours to follow. After giving up the chase, Commander Craven went to the Mediterranean, where he succeeded in watching the CSS Sumter so closely that her officers and crew finally abandoned the ship at Gibraltar.

The Tuscarora was ordered home in 1863, and Commander Craven was detached and placed in command of the Tecumseh, then being built at Secor's yard, Jersey City. The following spring, the Tecumseh left New York and joined the squadron of Admiral Lee in the James River.

== Death at Battle of Mobile Bay ==
Shortly after, the Tecumseh was sent to join Admiral Farragut's fleet in the projected attack on Mobile. The position of Commander Craven in the attack, which took place August 5, was at the head of the column of monitors which was on the starboard hand of the wooden vessels between them and Fort Morgan. Admiral Farragut in his reports states:

"The attacking fleet steamed steadily up the main ship channel, the Tecumseh firing the first shot at forty-seven minutes past six o'clock. At six minutes past seven the fort opened on us, and was replied to by a gun from the USS Brooklyn, and immediately after the action became general. It was soon apparent that there was some difficulty ahead. The Brooklyn, for some cause which I did not then clearly understand, but which has since been explained by Captain Alden in his report, arrested the advance of the whole fleet, while at the same time the guns of the fort were playing with great effect upon that vessel and the Hartford. A moment after I saw the Tecumseh, struck by a torpedo, disappear almost instantaneously beneath the waves, carrying with her her gallant commander and nearly all her crew."

The captain and the pilot were in the conning tower directly over the turret, whence there was no escape save through a narrow opening. Upon reaching this Commander Craven turned to the pilot and said, "You first, sir." The pilot, John Collins, escaped, and, as he related, the vessel sank under him, carrying her crew of one hundred and sixteen in all, save himself and the few that were able to escape through the port holes. A buoy in Mobile Bay marks the spot where the Tecumseh lies.

== Tribute ==
Henry Newbolt's poem "Craven" describes the actions of Commander Tunis Craven.

Craven

(Mobile Bay, 1864)

Over the turret, shut in his iron-clad tower,
Craven was conning his ship through smoke and flame;
Gun to gun he had battered the fort for an hour,
Now was the time for a charge to end the game.

There lay the narrowing channel, smooth and grim,
A hundred deaths beneath it, and never a sign;
There lay the enemy's ships, and sink or swim
The flag was flying, and he was head of the line.

The fleet behind was jamming; the monitor hung
Beating the stream; the roar for a moment hushed,
Craven spoke to the pilot; slow she swung;
Again he spoke, and right for the foe she rushed.

Into the narrowing channel, between the shore
And the sunk torpedoes lying in treacherous rank;
She turned but a yard too short; a muffled roar,
A mountainous wave, and she rolled, righted, and sank.

Over the manhole, up in the iron-clad tower,
Pilot and Captain met as they turned to fly:
The hundredth part of a moment seemed an hour,
For one could pass to be saved, and one must die.

They stood like men in a dream: Craven spoke,
Spoke as he lived and fought, with a Captain's pride,
"After you, Pilot." The pilot woke,
Down the ladder he went, and Craven died.

All men praise the deed and the manner, but we---
We set it apart from the pride that stoops to the proud,
The strength that is supple to serve the strong and free,
The grace of the empty hands and promises loud:

Sidney thirsting, a humbler need to slake,
Nelson waiting his turn for the surgeon's hand,
Lucas crushed with chains for a comrade's sake,
Outram coveting right before command:

These were paladins, these were Craven's peers,
These with him shall be crowned in story and song,
Crowned with the glitter of steel and the glimmer of tears,
Princes of courtesy, merciful, proud, and strong.

== Namesakes ==
Three ships in the Navy have been named USS Craven for him.

A portion of East 156th Street in The Bronx was once called Craven Street in his honor."Fox Playground". NYCParks.
