= Raboso =

Raboso may refer to:

- San Juan Raboso, Puebla, a town sometimes called Raboso
- Raboso (grape)
