= Pass of Galaxara =

Coordinates: 18°40′11″N 98°26′52″W

Pass of Galaxara or Paso de Galaxara is a pass in Izúcar de Matamoros municipality, Puebla. It is the pass on the road between the towns of Atlixco and Izúcar de Matamoros. During the Mexican American War this pass was the site of the Affair at Galaxara Pass on November 24, 1847, between the Mexican mounted guerrilla force of General Joaquín Rea and the American force of General Joseph Lane. This pass is now the location of the town of La Galarza.
