= Acatlan y Piastla =

Acatlan y Piastla was an alcaldia mayore in New Spain located in what is today Puebla State. Its capital was Acatlán, known in Mixtec as Yucuyuxi.

Prior to the coming of the Spanish this area was divided between the Mixtec kingdoms of Acatlan, Chilla, Icxitlan and Petlaltzinco and the Nahuatl-speaking kingdom of Piastla. All of these were tributary states of the Aztec Empire. Piastla was in a region known as Totollan, while the other kingdoms were in the Mixteca Baja region.

Spanish control was established in this region in 1521. The government was set up under a corregidor in 1532. It was changed to an alcaldia mayore in 1558.

== Sources ==
- Gerhard, Peter. A Guide to the Historical Geography of New Spain. Cambridge: Cambridge University Press, 1972. p. 42-44.
