= Punta el Sombrerito =

Coordinates: 26°54′5″N 111°57′12″W

Punta el Sombrerito (Baja California Sur)

Punta el Sombrerito, also known as Punta Sombrero, is a small hill overlooks the entrance to the Estero de Mulege (Mulage estuary) and anchorage of the town of Mulege. It was described in 1851, as shaped as a hat or a pyramid on a round base like a fort. The hill now has a lighthouse at its apex, marking the entrance to the anchorage.

== History ==
During the Mexican American War a battery was mounted on the hill to protect the anchorage from the U. S. Navy. The battery actively engaged the Schooner Libertad in the Bombardment of Punta Sombrero exchanging fire with it for an hour and a half until it was silenced. However, the batteries fire stopped the attack of Libertad on a ship in the anchorage, and the USS Libertad withdrew following the end of the engagement.
