= Battle of Sacramento (Mexico) =

1847 battle of the Mexican-American War in Chihuahua State, Mexico

Coordinates: 28°52′18″N 106°11′11″W

Battle of the Sacramento River
- Part of the Mexican–American War
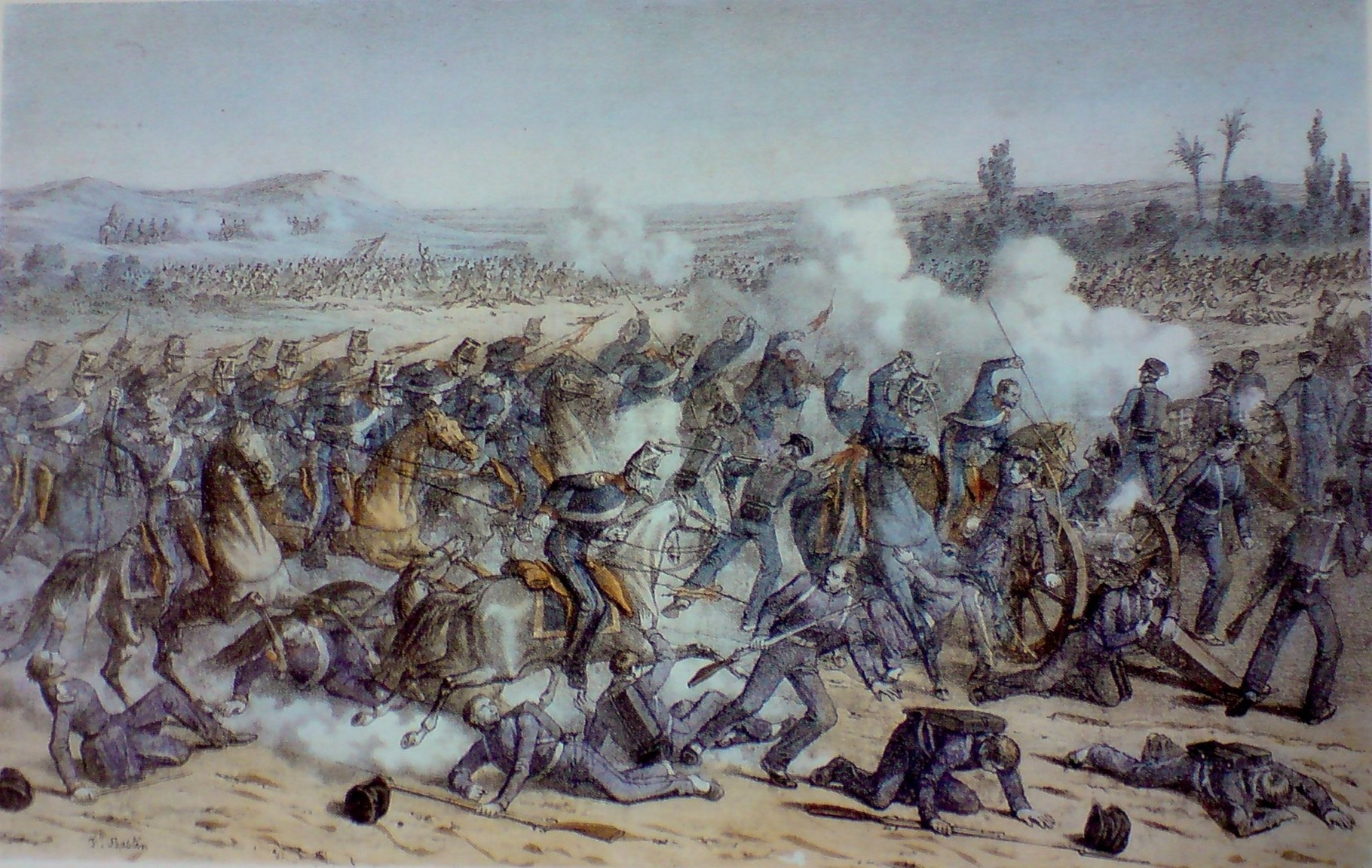
- Battle of the Sacramento, F. Bastin
Date	February 28, 1847
Location	Sacramento River, Chihuahua, Mexico
Result	United States victory

Belligerents
United States	Mexico

Commanders and leaders
Alexander Doniphan; Samuel Owens; Richard H. Weightman	Ángel Trías Álvarez; José Antonio Heredia; Francisco Garcia Conde

Strength
1,300	~1,000–1,300

Casualties and losses
N/D	N/D

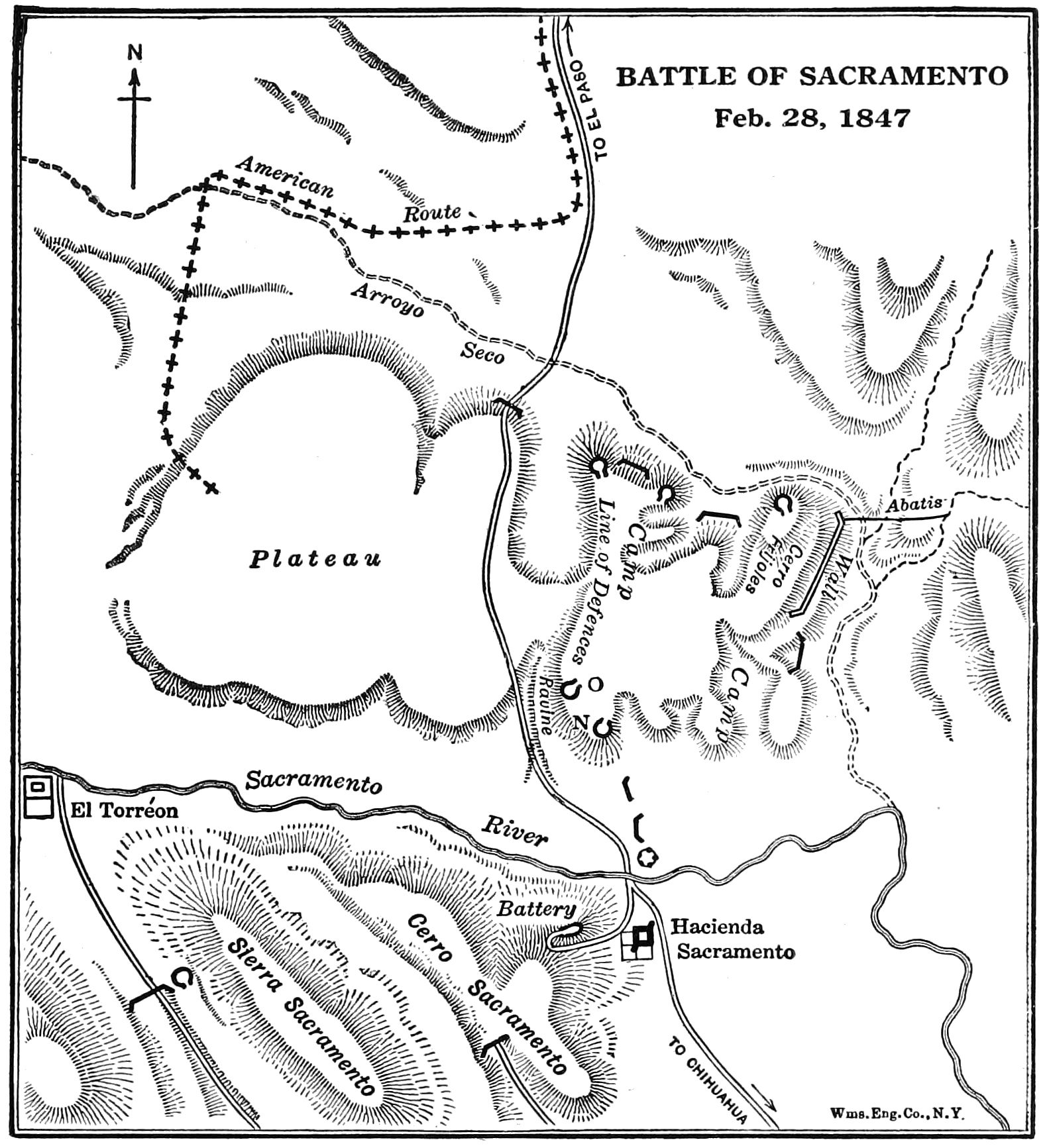
Disposition of forces along the Sacramento

The Battle of Sacramento, or the battle of the Sacramento River, took place on February 28, 1847, during the Mexican–American War. About fifteen miles (24 km) north of Chihuahua, Mexico, at the crossing of the Sacramento River, American forces numbering less than 1,000 defeated the superior Mexican army.

== Background ==
On February 8, Colonel Alexander Doniphan's force of 924 soldiers and 300 civilians left El Paso del Norte for Chihuahua, despite learning that John E. Wool had abandoned his march there. Major Samuel Owens had the civilians formed into a battalion along with the caravan of 312 wagons. On 25 February, they reached the Laguna de Encinillas, where they learned of the Mexican defenses prepared for them.

Governor Trias had built up a force under the command of General Jose A. Heredia, consisting of Around 800 cavalry (Gen. Garcia Conde: Vera Cruz Dragoons, Durango & Chihuahua Lancers), 250 infantry (Chihuahua Activos), 119 artillerymen (10 field guns & 6 culverins), 180 National Guards and Mostly Volunteer rancheros. They had constructed a redoubt near the Hacienda Sacramento where the El Paso road crosses the river, and at Hacienda el Torreon two miles (3.2 km) to the west.

At sunrise on February 28, the Americans took up the line of march and formed the whole wagon train into four columns with the artillery and mounted men in the middle. Three companies screened the front. When the Americans arrived within sight of the Mexican defenses, Doniphan made a reconnaissance of the enemy positions. Twenty-three separate works had been dug for twelve 4- to 9-pounders and nine lighter pieces.

== Battle ==
Doniphan used his cavalry to screen the movement of his force parallel to the Arroyo Seco and to the right and out of range of the Mexican artillery. Doniphan formed the wagons into a fort after crossing the gully onto a plateau, and Major Meriwether Lewis Clark Sr.'s guns fired on General Garcia Conde's lancers, forcing them to flee.

Doniphan's men approached the southernmost Mexican earthworks, held by Heredia's best troops. Doniphan ordered Capt. Richard H. Weightman's twin howitzers to the front accompanied by Capt. Reid's force of mounted cavalry men. Major Owens was killed in the charge, but Missourians took the fort.

Trias made a counterattack and Captured an Artillery piece that made the Americans Retreat. By 5 PM the fighting was over.

== Aftermath ==
Unable to defend Chihuahua, Trias fled to Parras. Doniphan commented, "The fire of our battery was so effective as to completely silence theirs." Doniphan's men marched into Chihuahua on March 2, and on April 23 he was ordered to bring his men to Saltillo, reaching Encantada on May 21.

Mexician sources One recurring phrase in oral retellings (recorded in interviews from the 1930s and 1940s) says:

“Los americanos vinieron con sus carretas y se llevaron a sus muertos, más de doscientos, para darles sepultura cristiana cerca del río.” (“The Americans came with their wagons and took their dead — more than two hundred — to give them a Christian burial near the river.”)

== In popular culture ==
The Battle of the Sacramento River is mentioned in the 1985 Western novel Blood Meridian. While interned in a Chihuahua City prison, the main character meets a veteran of the battle who recounts the events.

== See also ==
- Battles of the Mexican–American War

== Gallery ==
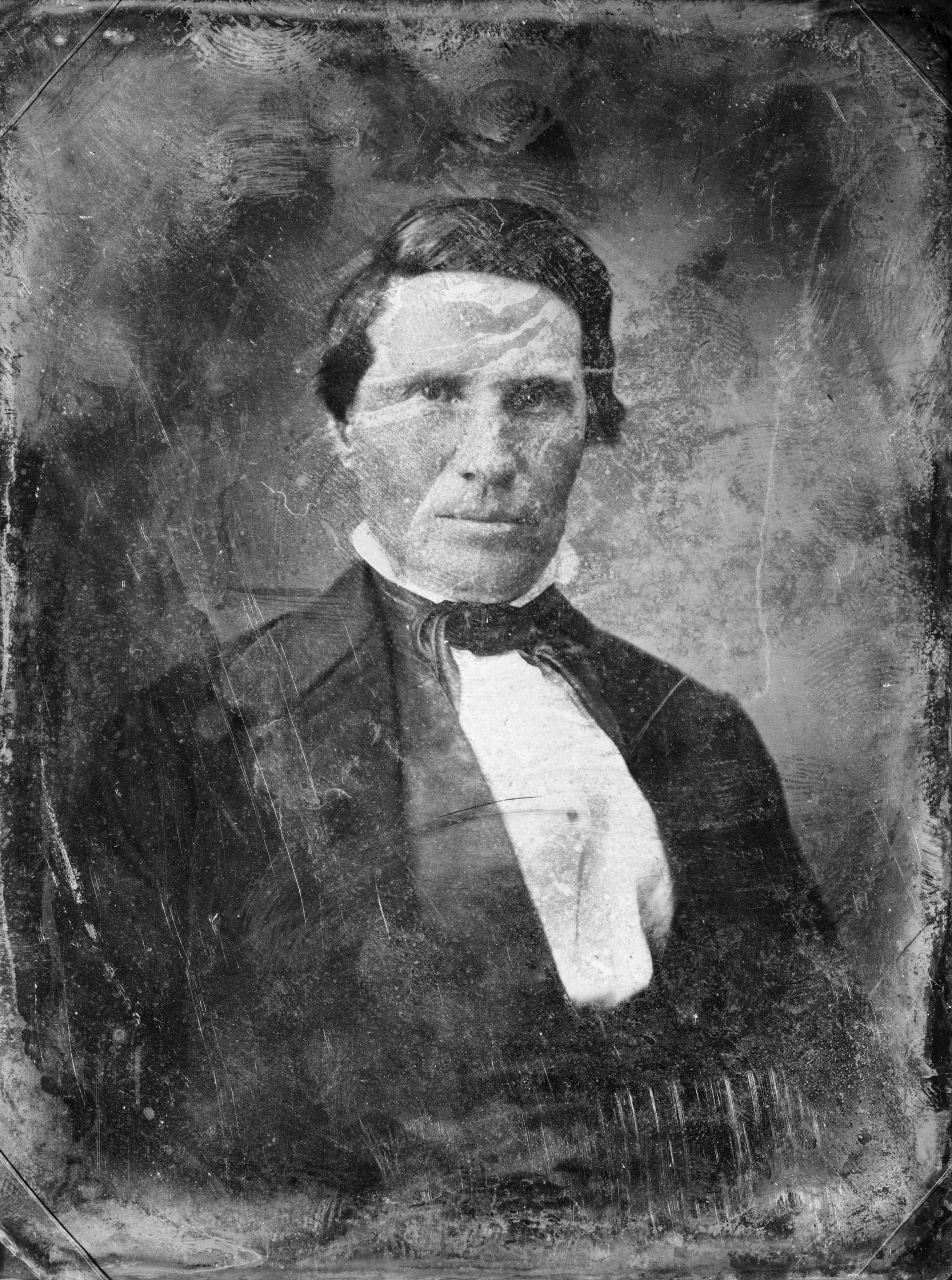
Colonel Alexander Doniphan

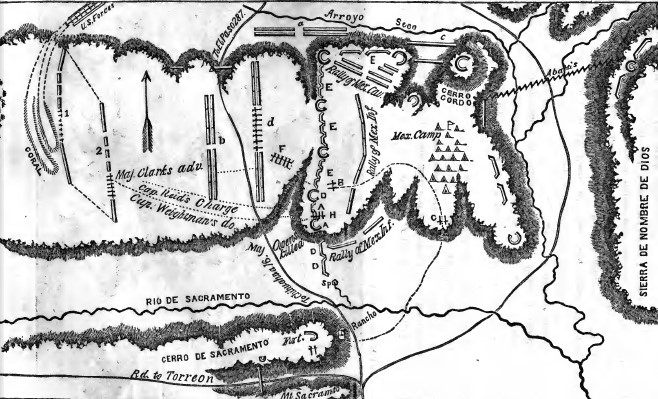
Doniphan's Map from John T. Hughes' 1847 Doniphan's Expedition

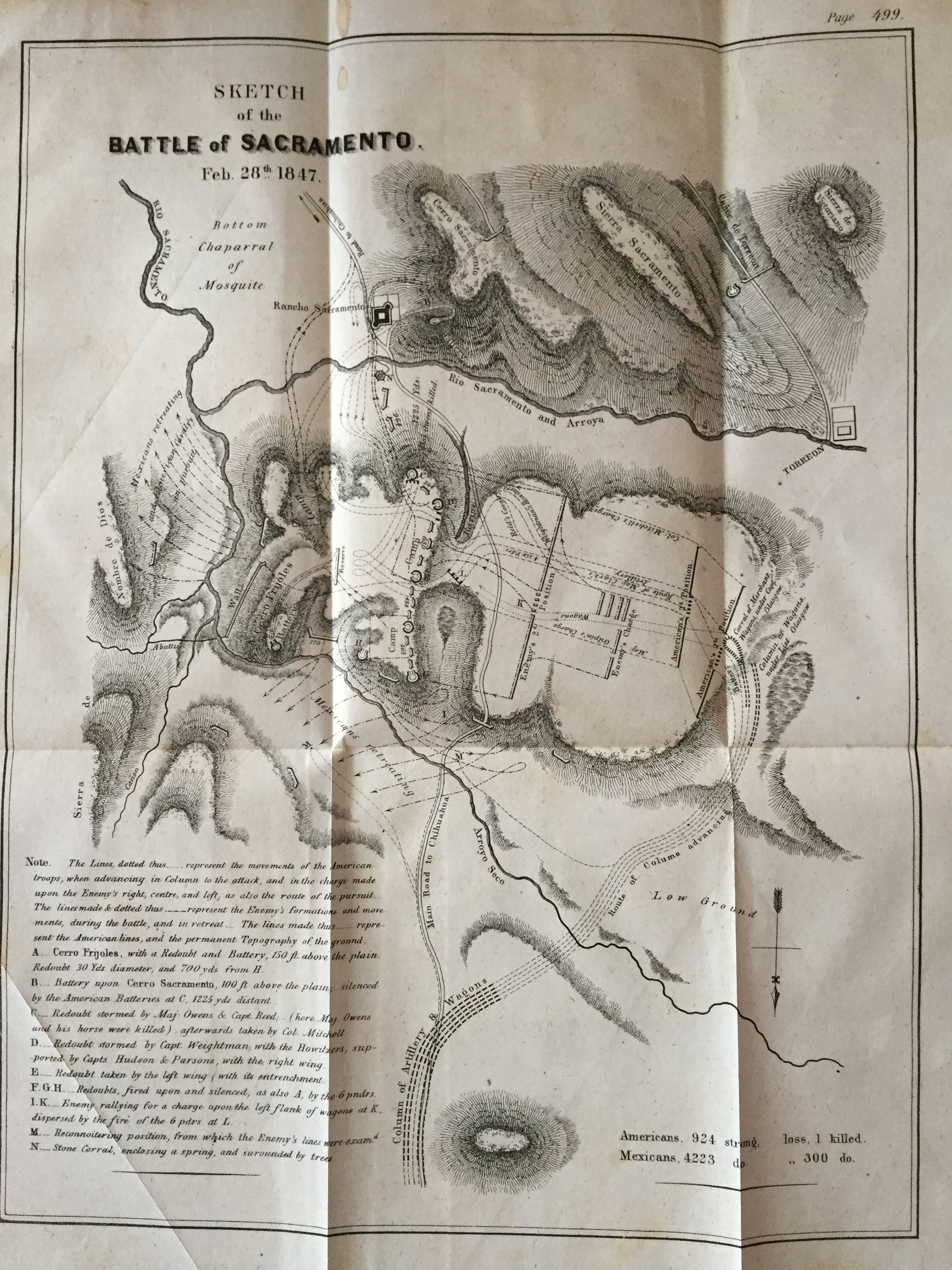
Sketch of the Battle of Sacramento Omnis Viae Private Collection
