= Paulina Ana María Zapata Portillo =

Mexican politician

Anita Zapata
- Born: Paulina Ana María Zapata Portillo; 22 June 1915; Izucar de Matamoros, Puebla, Mexico
- Died: 28 February 2010 (aged 94); Cuautla, Morelos, Mexico
- Occupation(s): politician, feminist, suffragette
- Years active: 1935–1961
- Known for: 1st female federal delegate from Morelos

Paulina Ana María Zapata Portillo (22 June 1915 – 28 February 2010), daughter of General Emiliano Zapata, was a suffragist who fought for the vote for Mexican women and was the first female federal representative from the state of Morelos.

== Biography ==
Zapata was born on 22 June 1915 in Izucar de Matamoros, Puebla, Mexico, to Emiliano Zapata Salazar and Petra Portillo Torres. Because her father was murdered when she was four and the family was persecuted by his enemies, Anita was taken to live with family members in Chietla, Puebla.

When she was aged 20, Anita began working for feminist causes and joined the Unión de Mujeres Americanas (Union of American Women), which had been founded in 1934 by Margarita Robles de Mendoza. The UMA Chapter of Morelos was founded in 1935 with Zapata as its president. She organized women to fight for the vote in Morelos, recruited women from Guerrero to join and served as the president of the Puebla chapter as well as the Morelos chapter. She also joined the Partido Nacional Revolucionario (PNR) (the precursor to PRI) and fought for the vote from within the ranks of the party, becoming president of the Asociación Nacional Femenina Revolucionaria the Institutional Revolutionary Party (PRI)'s women's affiliate.

In 1946, she married Manuel Manrique, with whom she had seven children: Isaías Manuel, Beatriz Ofelia, María del Carmen, Julieta Ana María (Fanny), Lina Martha, and twins Hermenegildo and Justino. Zapata served in many local political organizations, as treasurer of the ejido of Cuautla, as the land grant beneficiary of Cuautla, as municipal councilor and municipal trustee. From 1958 to 1961, she served as the first female federal representative from the state of Morelos as a PRI representative in the XLIV Federal Legislature.

Zapata died on 28 February 2010, in Cuautla, Morelos, Mexico.

== See also ==
- Politics of Mexico
