= Unión de Mujeres Americanas =

Organisation for women's rights activism

The Unión de Mujeres Americanas (Union of American Women, UAW) was founded in 1934 by Mexican women's rights activist and suffragette, Margarita Robles de Mendoza. The purpose of the organization was to develop ties between women in the region to fight for the civic and political rights of women throughout the Americas and improve women's social and economic situations. She served as first chair along with an international board which initially had representatives from Cuba, the Dominican Republic, Peru and Venezuela. The headquarters of the organization is in New York City, but there are branches of affiliates in almost every country of the Western Hemisphere.

In the 1930s and 1940s much of the work of the organization was directed towards enfranchisement, in the widest sense of the word, but even more specifically, as in the case of Nicaragua, towards the attainment of women's rights, an advocacy led by educator Josefa Toledo de Aguerri (b. Juigalpa, 1866 – d. Managua, 1962) and by the President of the Nicaraguan Feminist League, Dame Angélica Balladares Montealegre de Arguello Vargas, (b. Chinandega, 1872 – d. San Marcos, 1973) both of whom named "Women of the Americas" (1950) and "Woman of Nicaragua" (1959), respectively by the Union, with Dame Angelica, also known as the "First Lady of Liberalism" being the prime mover behind the attainment of worker's legal rights, as early as in 1936, an effort which led to the approval of the first legal code in 1946.

In Colombia, work towards the enfranchisement of women was led by María Currea Manrique, Josefina Valencia and Esmeralda Arboleda, the last of whom working hand in hand with the Inter-American Commission of Women (CIM), the organization was concerned with disparities of legal status for women, as in their 1937 endorsement of a CIM project to clarify the legal status of married women and illegitimate children. In Puerto Rico the organization was tied to pacifist organizations, worked for racial parity, and against white-supremacist groups while in places like Tlaxcala, Mexico; Puebla, Mexico; and Venezuela women like Elvira Trueba and Paulina Ana María Zapata Portillo as well as another UAW laureate, Dame Amelia Benard de Lacayo, (1897-1987), in Nicaragua, were working for socioeconomic gains for women, as well as political gains.

Today the organization functions under the direction of the CIM but derives its own funding from member dues and has its own board of directors composed of the president, four vice presidents, a treasurer and three secretaries (one for recording, one for internal affairs, and one for external affairs).
