= Bombardment of Punta Sombrero =

- Part of the Mexican–American War
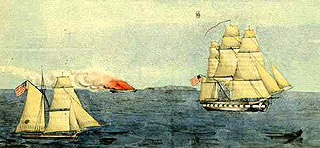
- USS Dale (right) and USS Liberdad (left) burning Alerta (center) off Loreto, Mexico.
Date	October 31, 1847
Location	Punta Sombrero, Mulege, Baja California Sur, Mexico
Result	United States victory, Mexican shore batteries silenced.

Belligerents
United States	Mexico

Commanders and leaders
Tunis Craven	Unknown

Strength
1 schooner Libertad	1 shore battery

Casualties and losses
Schooner damaged	Unknown

The Bombardment of Punta Sombrero was an American naval bombardment in response to a Mexican attack on a United States Navy warship during the Mexican–American War, on October 31, 1847.

== Background ==
Following the Battle of Mulege and the christening of the chartered schooner Libertad, Lieutenant Tunis Craven took command and set sail north, up the Gulf of California. Libertad was most likely armed with three or four cannons taken from Loreto days earlier by the crew of USS Dale.

Her mission was to disrupt enemy communications from Mulegé's garrison to other communities and fortifications. According to reports, the Mexican population of coastal towns grew terrified of the repeated appearances of Libertad in the waters off their settlements. No engagements occurred until October 31, when Tunis Craven spotted a Mexican merchant schooner, in the anchorage of Mulege at 10:00 pm.

Unknown to Craven at the time, the Mexican schooner was protected by an artillery battery of considerable strength at the mouth of the anchorage on Punta Sombrero, with several riflemen to guard the battery.

== Bombardment ==
The American Lieutenant advanced his ship, but the Mexican batteries witnessed the attack and opened fire. Craven later reported the initiation of the action:

"I heard no sound ashore, but the passing of the sentry's call, till about half-past ten o'clock, when bang! bang! bang! they commenced from every direction. I jumped out of my bed, seized my gun and fired at the group nearest me, which I could only discern by the flashes of their guns".

The Libertad, well armed and prepared for action, immediately abandoned the attempt to capture a prize ship. Instead she opened fire on the Mexican batteries with her guns, one of which was a pivot gun which was set up in haste just after hostilities commenced. The Mexicans found themselves in a good defensive position that night.

The moon was rising behind the American vessel leaving her silhouetted against the horizon. This made the United States ship easier to see despite having to engage in an artillery duel at night. Craven ordered his men to fire on what appeared to be the largest concentrations of Mexican forces.

Craven reported that the Mexicans kept up a steady stream of cannonballs on their target, most of them however flew over the ship or passed just across Libertad's bow. The fighting lasted about two hours, slowly the batteries reduced their rate of fire before being mostly silenced at about 11:00 pm and by 12:00 midnight, all was quiet again.

== Aftermath ==
No Americans were wounded that night. Libertad received slight damage to her sails and rigging but was otherwise unharmed. Mexican casualties are unknown as it was too dark to ascertain casualties from the American perspective. Lieutenant Craven decided not to send a land party ashore that night, so instead he proceeded to meet USS Dale off Guaymas but was too late to participate in the Bombardment of Guaymas.

== See also ==
- Pacific Coast Campaign
