= La Galarza =

Coordinates: 18.667778°N 98.455278°W

La Galarza in a town in the Municipality of Izúcar de Matamoros, in the state of Puebla. It is located in the Pass of Galarza at an elevation of 1400 meters above sea level. The population of La Galarza is 3846.

== History ==
During the Mexican American War the site of the town was open country, and the location of the Affair at Galaxara Pass a cavalry battle between the lancers of the Mexican Light Corps under Gen. Joaquín Rea and American Mounted Riflemen and Dragoons under Gen. Joseph Lane.
