= USS Craven =

Three ships of the United States Navy have been named Craven after Tunis Craven, a Navy Commander who died at the Battle of Mobile Bay.

- USS Craven (TB-10), a torpedo boat, commissioned in 1900 and decommissioned in 1913.
- USS Craven (DD-70), a destroyer, commissioned in 1918, served in the Royal Navy as Lewes until being scrapped in 1945.
- USS Craven (DD-382), a destroyer, commissioned in 1937 and decommissioned in 1945.
