= Chuviscar River =

Chuvíscar River
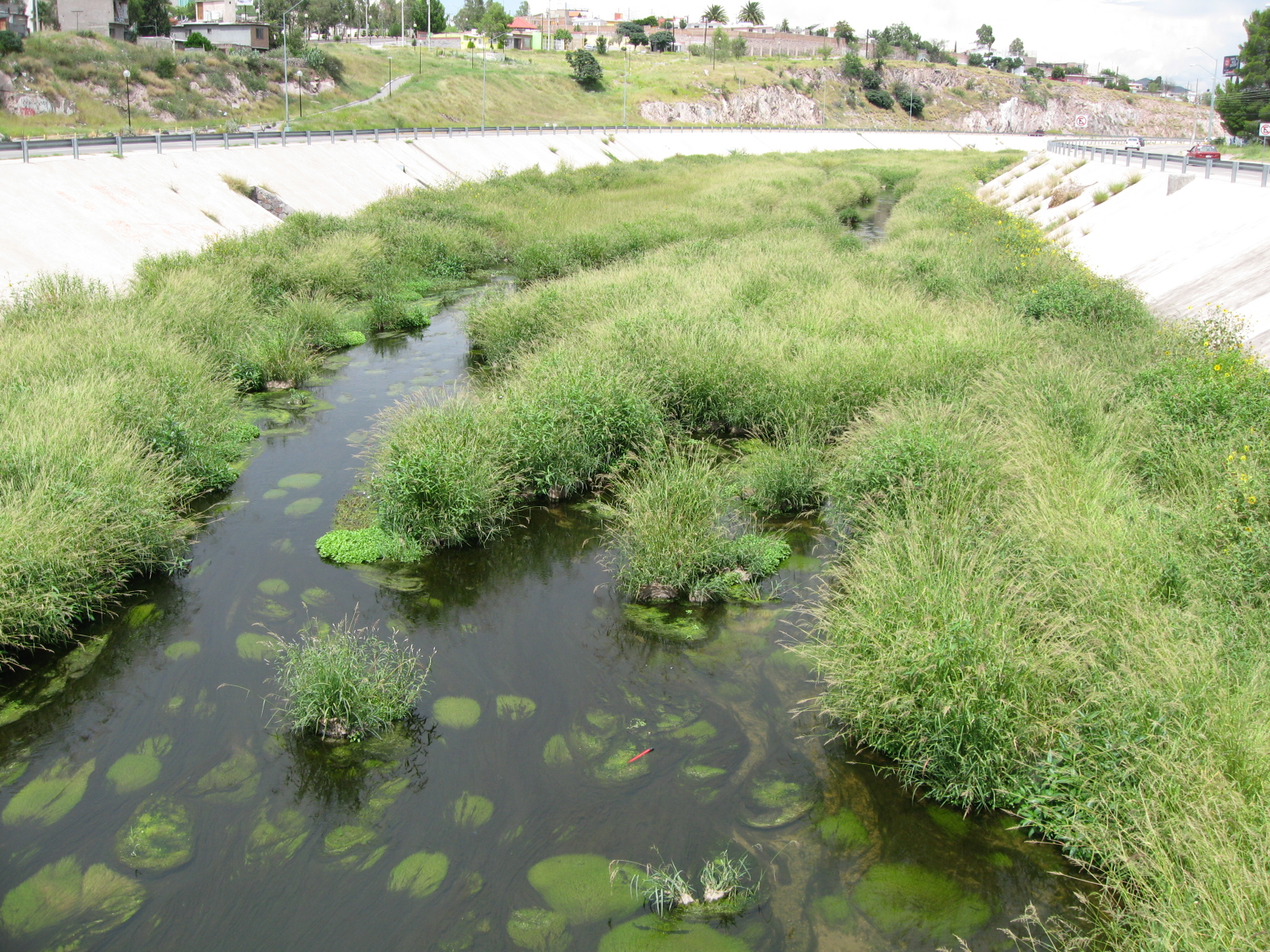

Location
- Country: Mexico
- State: Chihuahua

Physical characteristics
- Mouth
  - location: Rio Conchos

The Chuvíscar River is a river of Mexico. It is a tributary of the Rio Conchos, which in turn flows into the Rio Grande. It flows through the Mexican state of Chihuahua, directly through the state capital, the city of Chihuahua.

It rises in a place called Cañada del Chivato, in the municipality of Chihuahua. One of its tributaries is the Sacramento River.

== See also ==
- List of rivers of Mexico
- List of tributaries of the Rio Grande
