= Alfonso Castillo Orta =

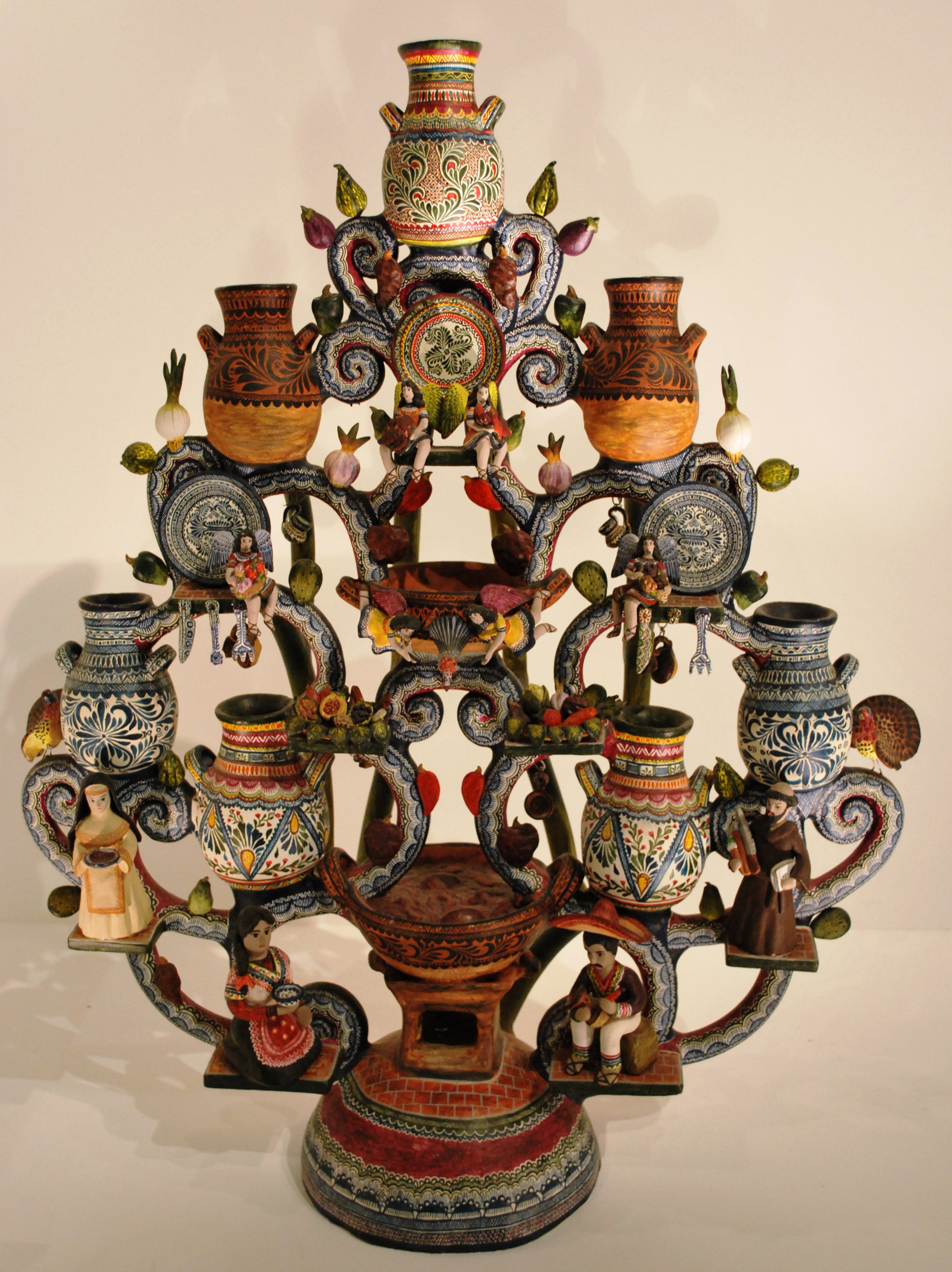
Tree of life dedicated to mole by the artisan at the Museo de Arte Popular

Alfonso Castillo Orta (1944 – January 2009) was a Mexican potter from the ceramics town of Izúcar de Matamoros, Puebla, whose work made the ceramics of this area internationally known. He was particularly known for his trees of life sculptures and received various awards for his work, including the Premio Nacional de Ciencias y Artes in 1996. He taught the craft to his wife and five children who continue to create pieces in his style in the family workshop.

== The artisan ==
Castillo Orta was born in Izúcar de Matamoros, Puebla, which has been a pottery center for many generations. It is one of two centers for ceramic sculptures called Trees of Life, along with Metepec, State of Mexico. Originally these depicted the story of Adam and Eve and were created as wedding gifts.

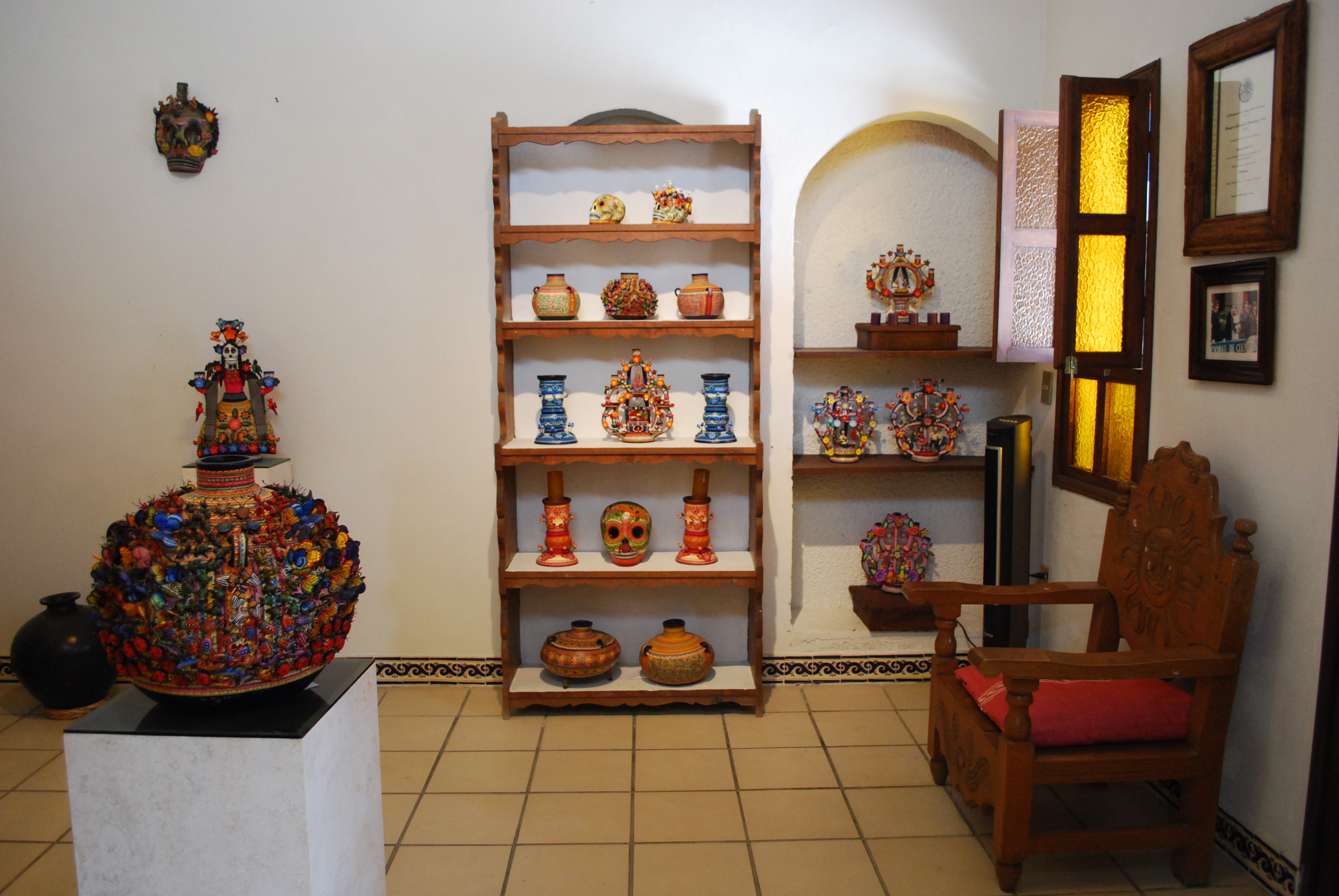
View of a display area in the family home and workshop in Izucar de Matamoros

Castillo Orta was a fourth generation potter, he learned to craft from his mother and grandfather, helping his mother at the family workshop when he was twelve. Along with his siblings, he began making utilitarian pieces along with candle holders and incense burners. However over his more than 40-year career, he experimented with more decorative pieces, refining his techniques to create his own unique style. He became particularly noted for his inventive trees of life, diversifying themes to include mole, other religious stories and festivals such as Day of the Dead. Castillo Orta became the center of popular art in Izúcar de Matamoros, leading the other artisans and making the town's polychromatic pottery known internationally.

The artisan's work has been exhibited in venues in Mexico, such as the Amparo Museum and in various other countries, especially in the United States where he had exhibitions in Chicago, Dallas, New York, Washington, San Diego, Philadelphia and other cities starting in 1988, as well as Germany, Austria and Spain. His work can be found in collections of the Museum of London, the Kunsthaus in Munich and the royal family of Spain along with collections in Germany, Japan, Venezuela and Italy. One of his most notable pieces is Homage to Mole, which is featured in the Grandes Maestros book of the Fomento Cultural Banamex. It is four feet high in Baroque style and dedicated to one of Mexico's signature dishes. This piece took six months.

Castillo Orta's work received numerous awards and recognitions, including the Premio Nacional de Artesanías "Las Manos de México" of FONART in 1993 and the Premio Nacional de Ciencias y Artes directly from President Ernesto Zedillo in 1996. (abetran) Other awards include first place at the Consurso Diciembre en la Tradición Popular of the Secretaría de Educación Pública in 1985, first place at the Gran Premio de Arte Popular in 1992 and 1994, an honorable mention at the Candelero Traditional competition of UNESCO in Havana in 1995, and the title of "grand master" by the Fomento Cultural Banamex in 2001.

== The family ==
Castillo Orta and his wife, Marta Hernández, had five children. He taught his wife the craft after they married and they in turn taught their children. Today, the family continues his work in the family home at Callejon del Partidor in the San Martín Huaquechula neighborhood of Izúcar de Matamoros keeping to the style he originated.

The family home serves as a workshop (in the central courtyard) as well as a gallery and museum, open to visitors. Most of the work found here is either for display only, such as a tree of life dedicated to Frida Kahlo or those destined for pre-existing orders.

The pieces are made from local clay, with firing done in a wood kiln. After firing, they are coated in a white paint that served as the background then decorative elements are added with tempura paints using natural pigments such as indigo for blue and cochineal for red. The family is still best known for trees of life with elements ranging from Catrinas, angels, demons, warriors, skeletons, musicians and more. In addition, they made skeletal figures for Day of the Dead, incense holders and other ceremonial pieces, and figures of farm workers and carpenters, reflecting the family's occupations before they became full-time potters. The pieces are capricious and with a sense of irony, reflecting influence from José Guadalupe Posada. The family still has pieces exhibited abroad with the largest piece created being a 3.7-meter tree of life, made in nine sections so that it could be transported to the buyer.
