= Piaxtla =

Coordinates: 18.1048°N 98.2868°W

- Municipality and town
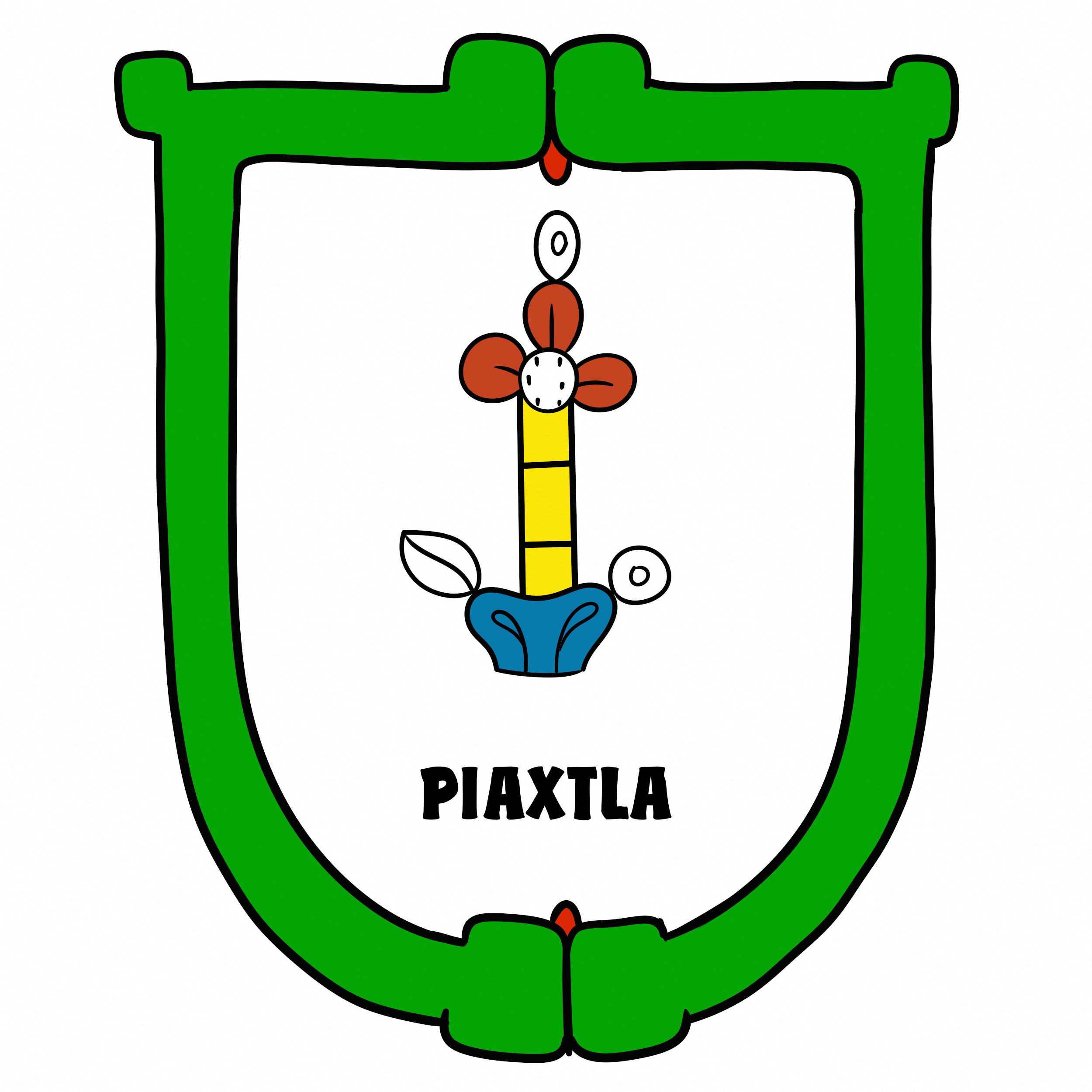
- Coat of arms
- Interactive map of Piaxtla
- Country: Mexico
- State: Puebla
- Time zone: UTC-6 (Zona Centro)

Piaxtla (Mixtec: Sahañuuquu, 'At the foot of the Place of Incense-burners') is a town and municipality in the Mexican state of Puebla.

== See also ==
- Piaxtla River
- Acatlan y Piastla
- Acatlán de Osorio
