= Action of Atlixco =

Battle of the Mexican-American war

Coordinates: 18°54′10″N 98°26′15″W

- Part of the Mexican–American War
Date	October 19, 1847
Location	Atlixco, Puebla
Result	American victory

Belligerents
United States	Mexico

Commanders and leaders
Joseph Lane	Joaquín Rea

Strength
1,500 infantry squadron of 3rd U.S. Dragoons; 5 guns	Unknown

Casualties and losses
1 killed 5 wounded, one if which was fatal. 1 missing	219 killed 300 wounded

The action of Atlixco, also known as the Atlixco affair, on October 19, 1847, was a U.S. victory late in the Mexican–American War by an American force under General Joseph Lane that defeated the Light Corps of the Mexican Army under General Joaquín Rea and captured their base at Atlixco a week after Lane had driven Rea from his lines and relieved the Siege of Puebla.

== See also ==
- Battles of the Mexican–American War
