= Tepexi el Viejo =

Archaeological site in Mexico

Tepexi el Viejo is a pre-Columbian archaeological site in Mexico, located southeast of the city of Puebla. The name was originally Tepexic, which means "split rock or steep" in Nahuatl, composed of the words tetl ("stone") and pexic ("split" or "cut").

== History ==
The site served as the head of one of the most important lordships. It was occupied from 2013 B.C. until the Spanish Conquest. Shirley Gorennstein defined three phases based on her analysis of the area's architecture and pottery: (1350 - 1450 AD) Phase Huichi, (1300 1350 AD), and Phase Xaqua Toyna (1450 AD -. Conquest).

== Design ==
The core of the site is a walled fortress, which is located at the confluence of two deep ravines (140 meters high); one of them is the Xamilpa or Lazamilpan river, giving the spot strategic importance: this river is a tributary of Atoyac River. The area consists of a wall surrounding the exposed archaeological structures of squares and ceremonial mounds, which suggests it was once a military fortress.
