= San Juan Raboso =

- Location in Mexico
- Coordinates: 18°34′15″N 98°26′31″W
- Country: Mexico
- State: Puebla
- Municipality: Izúcar de Matamoros
- Elevation: 1,270 m (4,170 ft)

Population
  - Total: 3,637

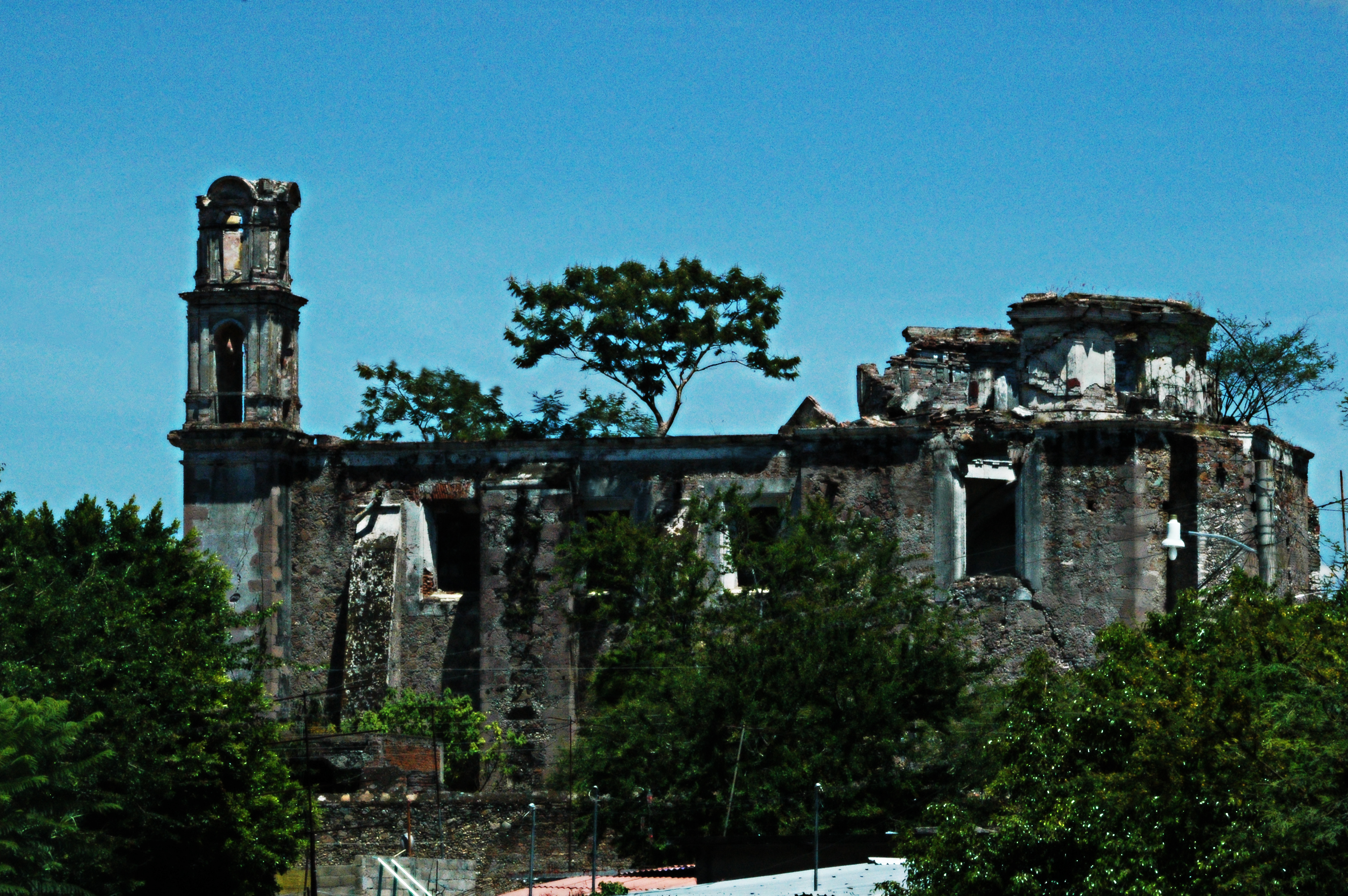
Ruins of a former San Juan Raboso hacienda

San Juan Raboso is a community in the municipality of Izúcar de Matamoros, Puebla, Mexico, with 3,637 inhabitants.

It is about 4.5 km (2.8 mi) from the epicenter of the 2017 Puebla earthquake.

Mexican Federal Highway 120 passes through the town.
