= Sacramento River (Mexico) =

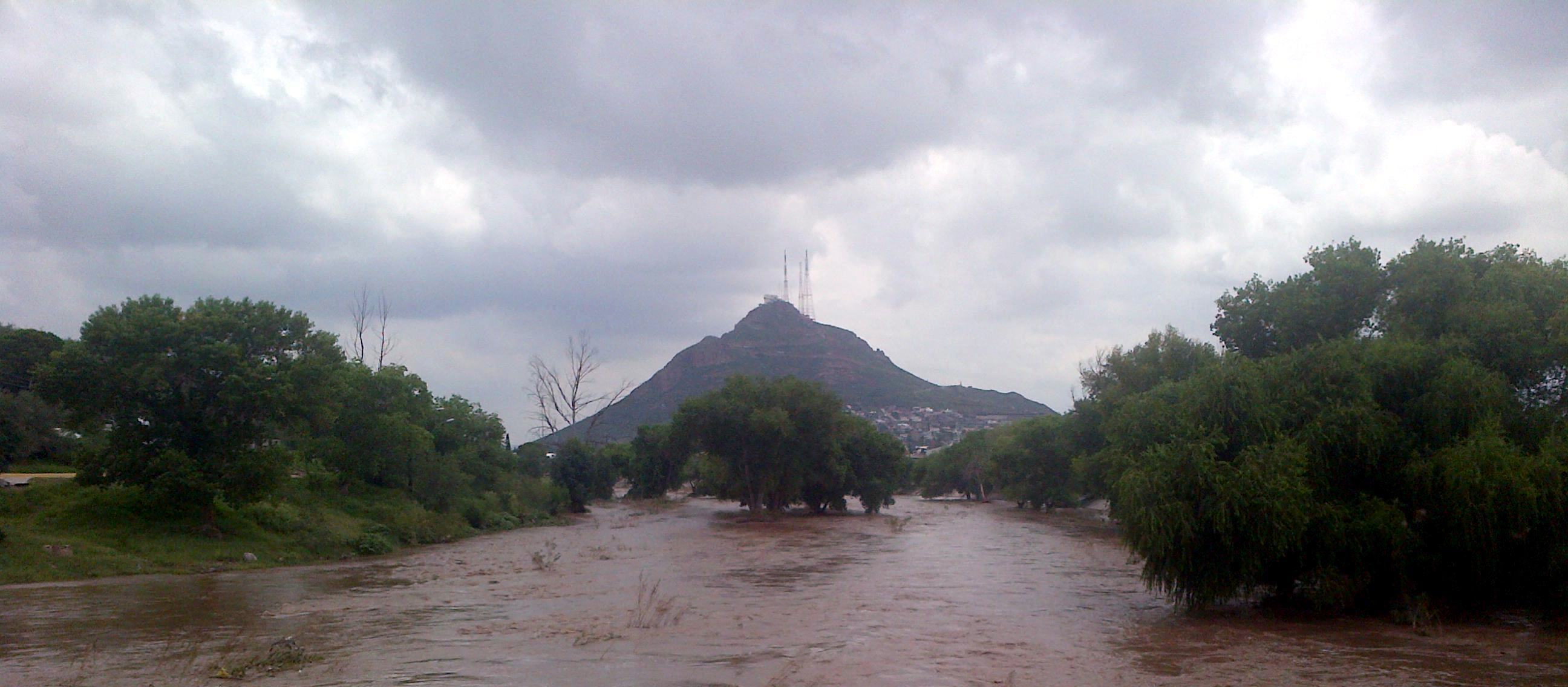
- Sacramento River passing along Chihuahua City

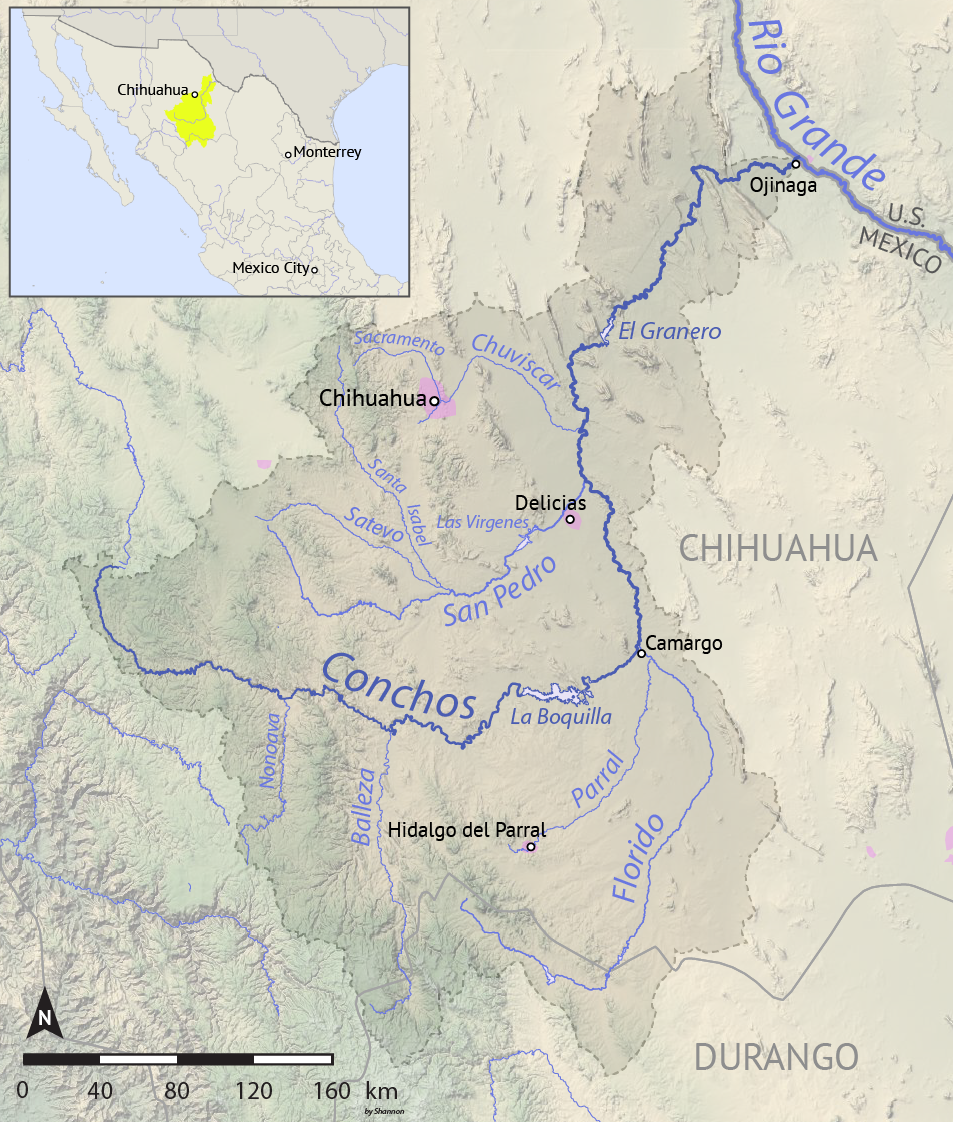
- Map of the Rio Conchos drainage basin, the Sacramento River is located north of Chihuahua city.

Location
- Country: Mexico

Physical characteristics
- Source
  - location: Sierra de Majalca
  - elevation: 2370 m.
- Mouth
  - location: Chihuahua City
  - elevation: 1395 m.

The Sacramento River is a short river in Mexico, the main tributary of the Chuvíscar River, which in turn is a tributary of the Rio Conchos which runs entirely through the state of Chihuahua to the Río Bravo.

== History ==
On February 28, 1847, a Mexican army in a defensive position was engaged by an advancing U.S. Army and was defeated along the river during the Mexican–American War. The engagement, fought about fifteen miles north of Chihuahua, is known as the Battle of Sacramento. The American victory permitted their army to occupy Chihuahua unopposed on March 2.

== See also ==
- List of rivers of Mexico
- Battle of the Sacramento
