= Alcaldía mayor =

An alcaldía mayor was a civil division of the government of New Spain until 1786 when the intendencia system was introduced. In 1786 there were 129 of these subdivisions.

== Sources ==
- Gerhard, Peter. A Guide to the Historical Geography of New Spain. Cambridge: Cambridge University Press, 1972.
