= Izúcar de Matamoros =

City in Puebla, Mexico

- City and municipality

- Location within Puebla (state) Location within Mexico
- Coordinates: 18.6028°N 98.4653°W
- Country: Mexico
- State: Puebla
- Municipality: Izúcar de Matamoros

Population (2020)
  - Total: 49,578
- Time zone: UTC-6 (CST)

Izúcar de Matamoros is a city in Izúcar de Matamoros Municipality located in the southwestern part of the Mexican state of Puebla. The city serves as the municipal seat of the municipality. At the census of 2005 the city had a population of 41,042 inhabitants, while the municipality had a population of 69,413. The municipality has an area of 514.11 km^{2} (198.5 sq mi), and stands at 1100 m above sea level. Its largest other communities are the towns of La Galarza and San Juan Raboso. It has many sights like the portales, and Santo Domingo, the biggest church in the city.

== History ==
Izúcar de Matamoros derives its name from the Náhuatl word Itzocan, which is composed of itztli, meaning "knife" or "flint," ohtli meaning "path," and -can. Therefore, it means "place of the flint path." Other interpretations suggest that it could mean "place of painted faces," or "place of obsidian" or "place where obsidian is worked." Itzocan was a notable altepetl inhabited by Nahuatl-speaking Nonoalca and ruled by a dynasty related to those of both Tenochtitlan and neighboring Huaquechula. The region around Itzocan was known as Coatlalpan, and the people as the Coatlalpaneca. Cotton was grown here, and there was a notable slave market. At some point, the town was conquered by the Aztec Empire. The Aztecs built a garrison here and made Itzocan subordinate to Tepeaca. Itzocan conducted wars against Piaxtla despite both being Aztec subjects. Mexican archaeologist Wigberto Jiménez-Moreno suggested that in addition to Nahuas, Mixtecs or Popoloca-speakers lived in the vicinity of Itzocan in the sixteenth century.

Izúcar de Matamoros was the site of the Mexican American War Skirmish at Matamoros on 23 November 1847.

The epicenter of the 2017 Puebla earthquake was about 6.0 km (3.7 mi) east of the city center.

== Agriculture ==
The agriculture of the surrounding countryside is devoted to growing sugar cane which is processed at a plant in Atencingo.

== Notable people ==
- Alfonso Castillo Orta (1944-2009), potter
- Ángel Maturino Reséndiz (1959-2006), serial killer
- Paulina Ana María Zapata Portillo (1915-2010), suffragist
