= Izúcar de Matamoros (municipality) =

Coordinates: 18.5476°N 98.4564°W

- Municipality
- Coat of arms

- Location of the municipality in Puebla
- Country: Mexico
- State: Puebla
- Seat: Izúcar de Matamoros

Population (2020)
  - Total: 82,809
- Time zone: UTC-6 (Zona Centro)

Izúcar de Matamoros is a municipality in the Mexican state of Puebla.

== Settlements ==
For 1998 there were seven settlements listed for the Izúcar de Matamoros municipality, with some having more than one ejido.

- Abelardo Rodriguez
- San Isidro
- Agua Escondida
- Ayutla
- Las Minas
- Matzaco
  - Puctla (ejido)
  - San Nicolás Tolentino (ejido)
- San Pedro Calantla
  - Santiago Mihuacan (ejido)
