= Libertad (1847 schooner) =

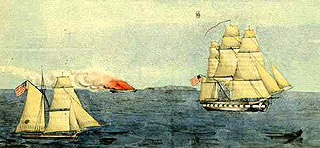
- USS Libertad (left), USS Dale (right) and burning Alerta (center) off Loreto.
Location	Loreto, Baja California Sur, Mexico

Libertad, meaning 'liberty' in Spanish, was a merchant schooner built on the west coast of Mexico for service between Mexico and the Baja California peninsula and along the coast of Mexico. During the Mexican–American War, she was captured at Loreto, Mexico, along with the schooner Fortuna on 1 October 1846 by the United States Navy sloop-of-war USS Cyane under the command of Commander Samuel Francis Du Pont.

The U.S. navy fitted Libertad for duty as a tender, armed with one 9-pounder gun, retaining her name. She was placed in service with Commodore Robert F. Stockton's Pacific Squadron early in 1847. Near the end of the war in February 1848, Libertad was sold at public sale.
