= Joaquín Rea =

Mexican general

Joaquín Rea (?–1850) was a Mexican general in the Mexican–American War.

General Rea led guerrilla forces of the Light Corps in harassing American convoys on the National Road between Vera Cruz and Puebla from May 1847. Due to this harassment by the guerrillas between Puebla and Vera Cruz, General Winfield Scott was forced to abandon his line of communications to make his attack on Mexico City.

Following the fall of Mexico City, General Rea and General Santa Anna attempted to besiege and capture Puebla cutting the American Army in Mexico City off from Vera Cruz in September 1847. Rea and Santa Anna failed to take it before the approach of a relief column from Vera Cruz under Brig. Gen. Joseph Lane prompted Santa Anna to leave the siege to stop him. Puebla was relieved by Gen. Lane October 12, 1847, following his defeat of Santa Anna at the Battle of Huamantla October 9, 1847. Lane pursued Rea and defeated him at the action of Atlixco, or "Atlixco affair", on October 18, 1847, and he was defeated again at the Affair at Galaxara Pass on November 24, 1847, by forces under General Lane. Nevertheless, guerrilla raids on the American supply route and American anti guerrilla actions continued until the end of the war with the truce in March 1848.

According to Harper's New Monthly Magazine, Vol. 2, No. 8, January, 1851:

"Mexico

We have intelligence from the City of Mexico to November 13. The question of the Presidency, it is conceded, is definitely settled in favor of Arista. The financial condition of the Republic still engages the attention of Congress, which body is yet occupied in arranging the interior and foreign debt. General Thomas Reguena died on the 13th ultimo, at Guadalajara, and General Manuel Romero on the 31st, at San Louis Potosi. General Joaquin Rea, living at a village called Minerva, was, about the same time, murdered by one Felipe Delgado, and a band of scoundrels under his command."
