= Mexican–American War =

1846–1848 conflict between Mexico and the United States

- Part of U.S. Territorial Expansion, and Manifest Destiny
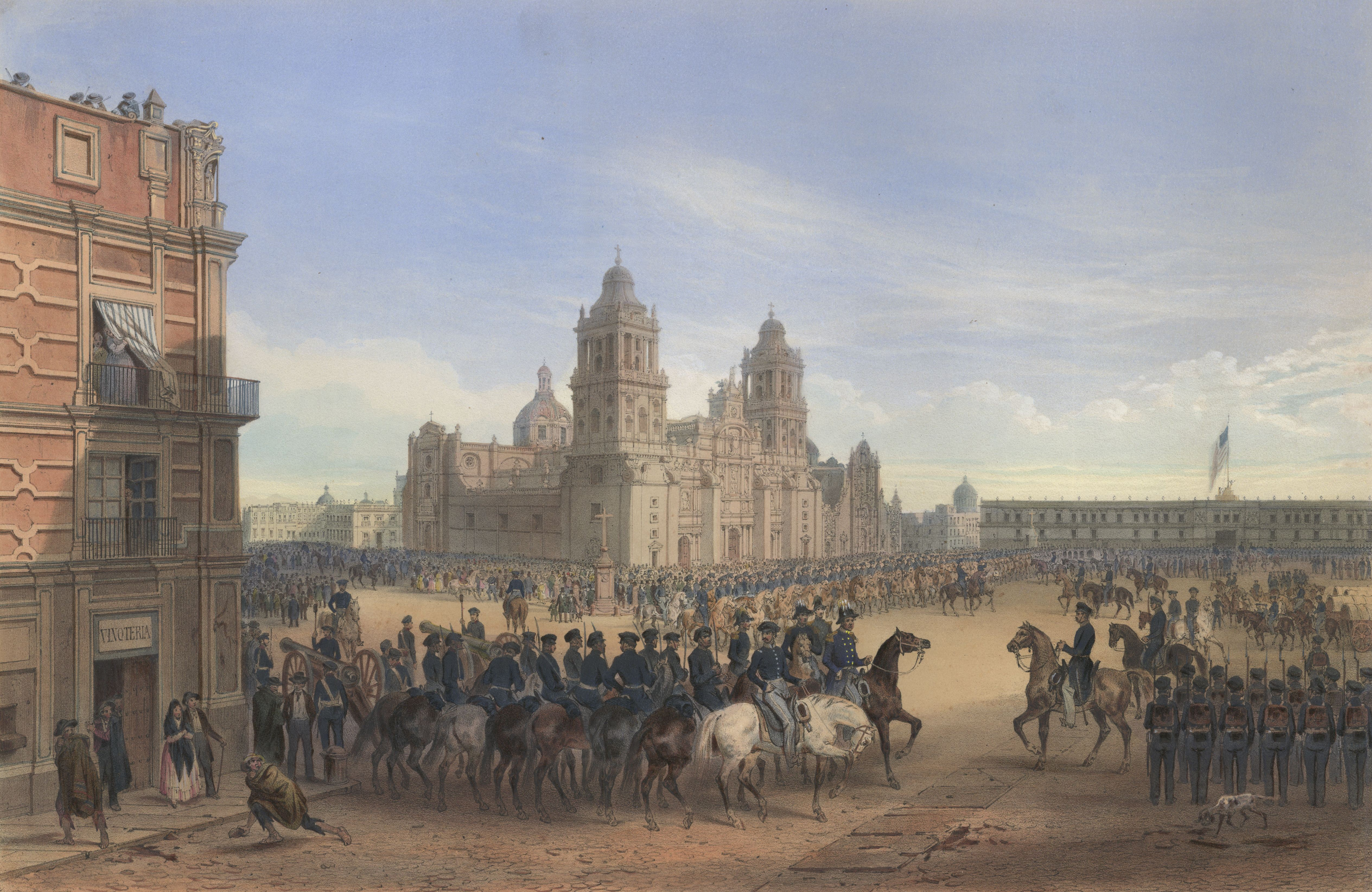
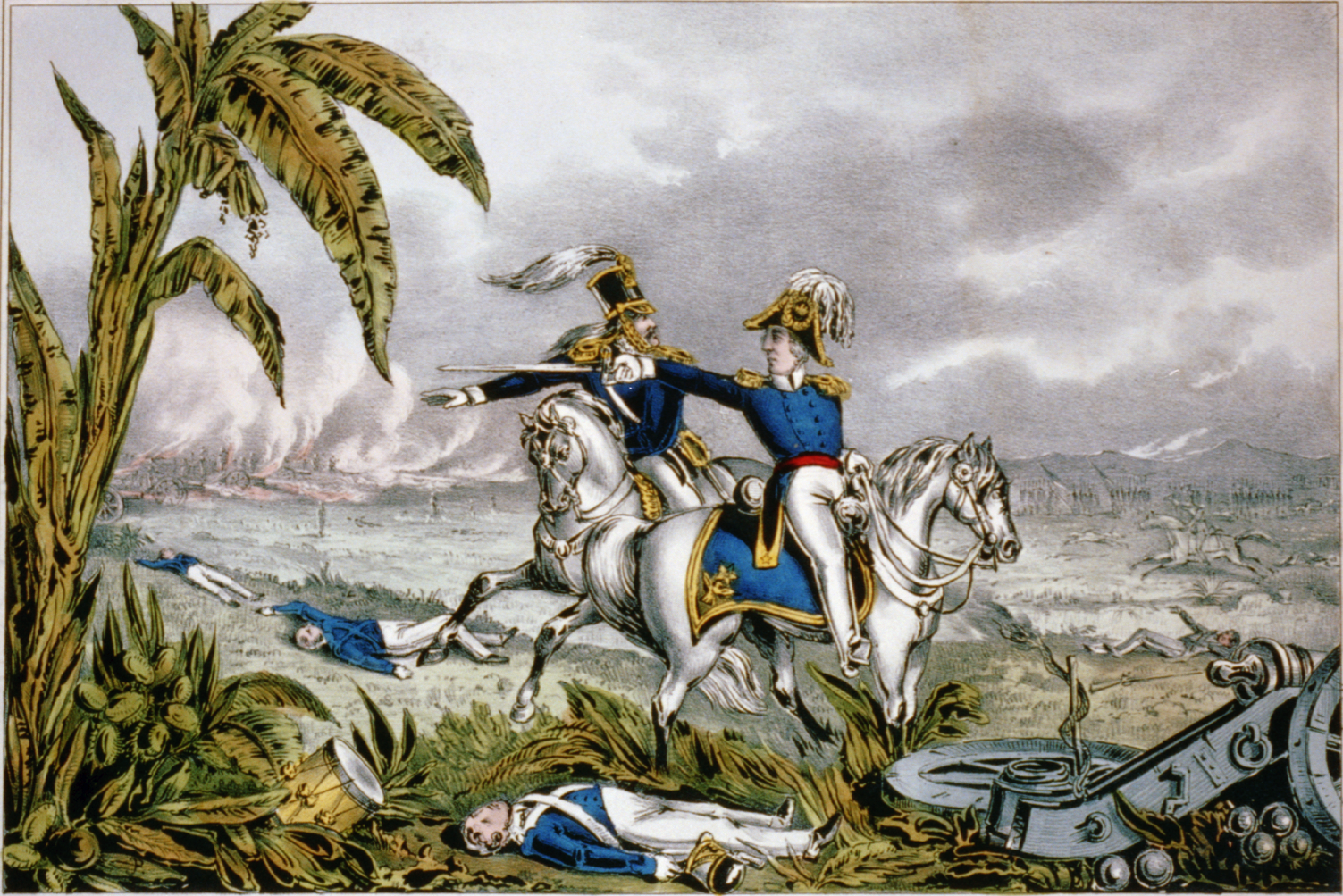
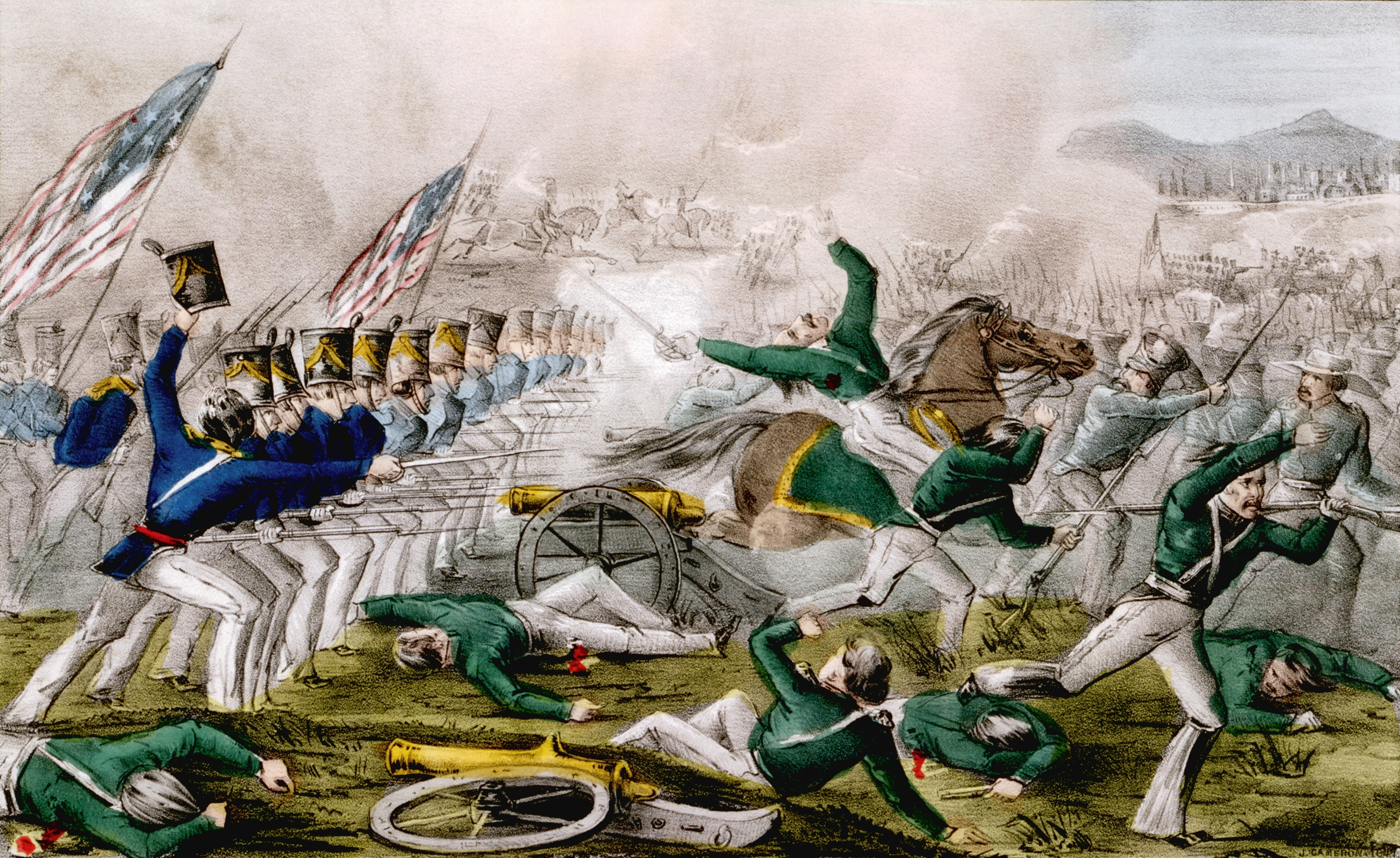
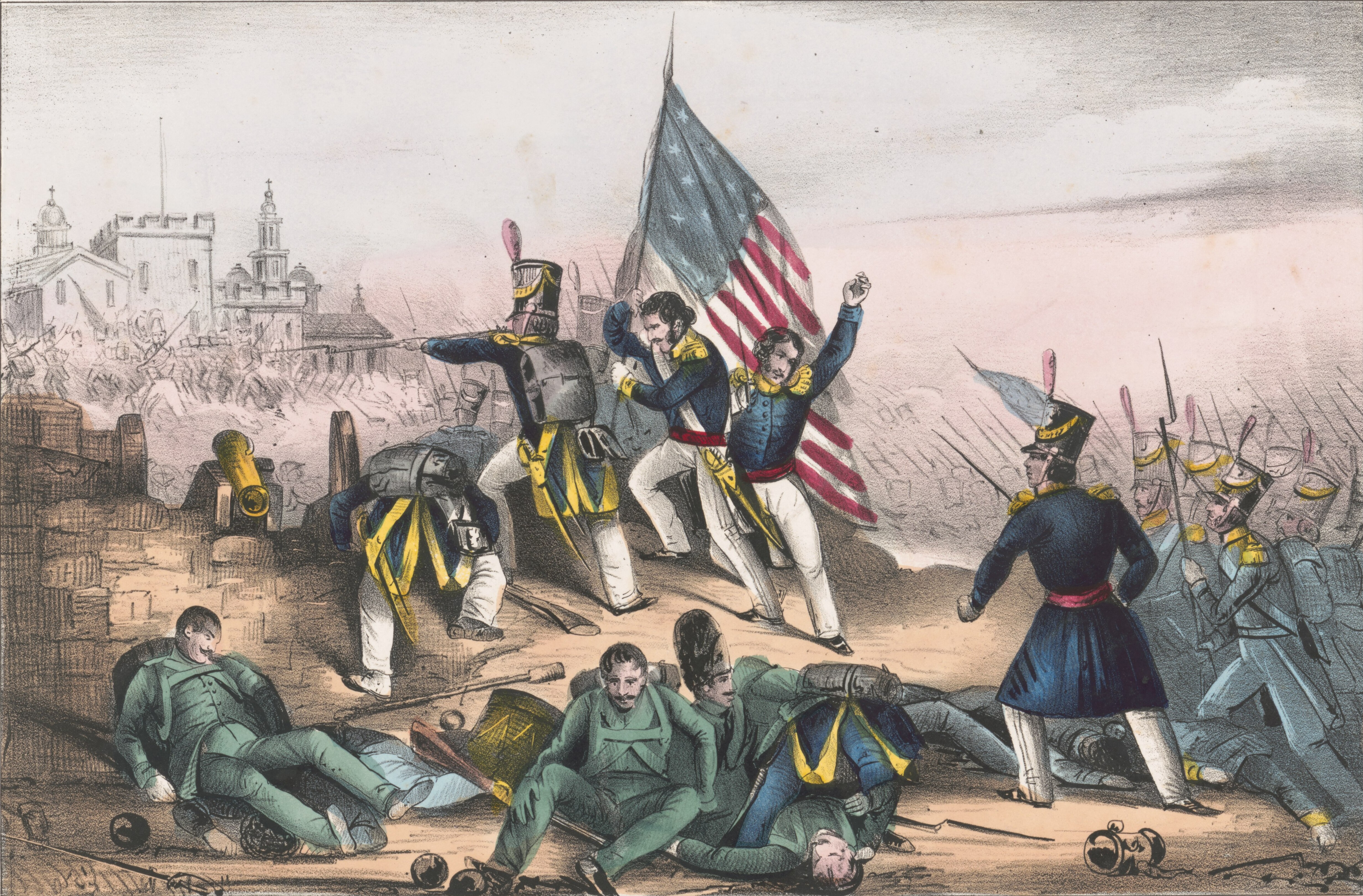
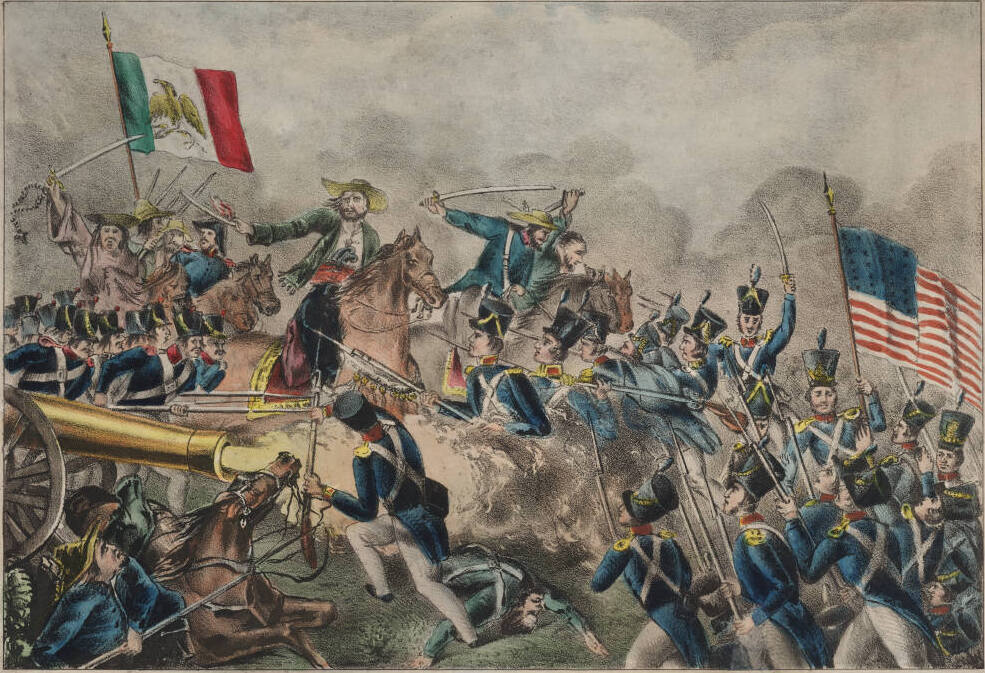
- Clockwise from top: Winfield Scott entering Plaza de la Constitución after the Fall of Mexico City, U.S. soldiers engaging the retreating Mexican force during the Battle of Resaca de la Palma, U.S. victory at Churubusco outside of Mexico City, Marines storming Chapultepec castle under a large U.S. flag, Battle of Cerro Gordo
Date	April 25, 1846 – February 2, 1848 (1 year, 9 months, 1 week and 1 day)
Location	Texas, New Mexico, California; Northern, Central, and Eastern Mexico; Mexico City
Result	American victory
Territorial changes	Mexican Cession: Mexico cedes to the U.S. present-day California, Texas, New Mexico, Utah, Nevada, and Arizona, and parts of Colorado, Oklahoma, Kansas, and Wyoming, for $15 million

Belligerents
United States: California (Note: From June 14 to July 9, 1846)	Mexico

Commanders and leaders
(United States) James K. Polk; (United States) George M. Dallas; (United States) William Marcy; (United States) Winfield Scott; (United States) George Bancroft; (United States) Robert Stockton; (United States) John Wool; (United States) John Fremont; (United States) John Sloat; (United States) John Mason; (United States) Zachary Taylor; (United States) William Hardee (POW); (United States) Jacob Brown (DOW); (United States) Earl Van Dorn; (United States) Archibald Gillespie (surrendered); (United States) Benjamin Wilson (surrendered); (United States) William Mervine; (United States) Stephen Kearny; (United States) Philip Cooke; (United States) Alexander Doniphan; (United States) Sterling Price (WIA); (United States) Ceran St. Vrain; (United States) John Burgwin †; (United States) Henry Clay Jr. †; Richard Weightman; (United States) John Adams; (United States) David Twiggs; (United States) William Harney; (United States) James Shields (WIA); (United States) William Worth; (United States) Thomas Childs; (United States) Joseph Lane; (United States) Henry Burton; (United States) Henry Naglee; (United States) David Conner; (United States) Matthew Perry; (United States) Elie Vallette; (United States) Thomas Selfridge; (United States) Tunis Craven; (United States) Charles Heywood; (United States) William Shubrick; (United States) French Forrest; (California Republic) / (United States) William Ide	Antonio López de Santa Anna; Mariano Paredes; Manuel Peña; Mariano Arista; Pedro Ampudia; Nicolás Bravo; José Mariano Salas; José Herrera; Pedro Anaya; Juan Álvarez; Joaquín Rea; Gabriel Valencia †; José de Urrea; Juan Almonte; Anastasio Torrejón; Francisco Mejía; José Castro; José Flores; Andrés Pico (surrendered); (Mexico) José del Lugo; José Carrillo; (Mexico) Manuel Armijo; (Mexico) Diego Archuleta; (Mexico) Pablo Montoya (executed); (Mexico) Tomás Romero (executed); (Mexico) Manuel Lombardini (WIA); (Mexico) Agustín Huarte; John Riley; (Mexico) Antonio León †; Felipe Xicoténcatl †; Joaquín Rea; Celedonio Jarauta; (Mexico) Manuel Muñoz; (Mexico) José Mijares; (Mexico) Martín de Cos

Strength
(United States) 78,718	(Second Federal Republic of Mexico) 82,000

Casualties and losses
Total: 18,130: 1,733 killed; 4,152 wounded; 11,550 dead from disease; 695 missing	Total: 35,000: 5,000 killed; 20,000 wounded; 10,000 missing
- Including civilians killed by violence, military deaths from disease and accidental deaths, the Mexican death toll may have reached 25,000 and the American death toll reached 13,283.

The Mexican–American War, (Note: Spanish: Guerra de Estados Unidos-México, Guerra mexicano-estadounidense, Guerra mexicano-americano, Guerra mexicano-norteamericano. Variations include U.S.–Mexican War, the US–Mexico War.) also known in the United States as the Mexican War and in Mexico as the United States intervention in Mexico, (Note: Spanish: Intervención estadounidense en México, Intervención americana en México or Intervención norteamericana en México, English: American intervention in Mexico. In Mexico, it may also be called the War of United States–Mexico (Guerra de Estados Unidos–México).) (April 25, 1846 – February 2, 1848) was an invasion of Mexico by the United States. It followed the 1845 American annexation of Texas, which Mexico still considered its territory because it refused to recognize the Treaties of Velasco, signed by President Antonio López de Santa Anna after he was captured by the Texian Army during the 1836 Texas Revolution. The Republic of Texas was de facto an independent country, but most of its Anglo-American citizens who had moved from the United States to Texas after 1822 wanted to be annexed by the United States.

Sectional politics over slavery in the United States had previously prevented annexation because Texas would have been admitted as a slave state, upsetting the balance of power between Northern free states and Southern slave states. In the 1844 United States presidential election, Democrat James K. Polk was elected on a platform of expanding U.S. territory to Oregon, California (also Mexican territory), and Texas by any means, with the 1845 annexation of Texas furthering that goal. However, the boundary between Texas and Mexico was disputed, with the Republic of Texas and the U.S. asserting it to be the Rio Grande and Mexico claiming it to be the more northerly Nueces River. Polk sent a diplomatic mission to Mexico in an attempt to buy the disputed territory, together with California and everything in between for $25 million (equivalent to $820 million in 2025), an offer the Mexican government refused. Polk then sent a group of 80 soldiers across the disputed territory to the Rio Grande, ignoring Mexican demands to withdraw. Mexican forces interpreted this as an attack and repelled the U.S. forces on April 25, 1846, a move that Polk used to convince the Congress of the United States to declare war.

Beyond the disputed area of Texas, U.S. forces quickly occupied the regional capital of Santa Fe de Nuevo México along the upper Rio Grande. U.S. forces also moved against the province of Alta California and then turned south. The Pacific Squadron of the U.S. Navy blockaded the Pacific coast in the lower Baja California Territory. The U.S. Army, under Major General Winfield Scott, invaded the Mexican heartland via an amphibious landing at the port of Veracruz on March 9 and captured the capital, Mexico City, in September 1847. Although Mexico was defeated on the battlefield, negotiating peace was politically complex. Some Mexican factions refused to consider any recognition of its loss of territory. Although Polk formally relieved his peace envoy, Nicholas Trist, of his post as negotiator, Trist ignored the order and successfully concluded the 1848 Treaty of Guadalupe Hidalgo. It ended the war, and Mexico recognized the cession of present-day Texas, California, Nevada, and Utah as well as parts of present-day Arizona, Colorado, New Mexico, and Wyoming. The U.S. agreed to pay $15 million (equivalent to $492 million in 2025) for the physical damage of the war and assumed $3.25 million of debt already owed by the Mexican government to U.S. citizens. Mexico relinquished its claims on Texas and accepted the Rio Grande as its northern border with the United States.

The U.S. victory and territorial expansion Polk had spearheaded inspired patriotism among some sections of the United States, but the war and treaty drew fierce criticism for the casualties, monetary cost, and heavy-handedness. The question of how to treat the new acquisitions intensified the debate over slavery in the United States. Some scholars see the Mexican–American War as leading to the American Civil War. Many officers who had trained at West Point Academy gained experience in the war and later played prominent leadership roles during the Civil War. In Mexico, the war worsened domestic political turmoil and led to a loss of national prestige, as it suffered large losses of life in both its military and civilian population, had its financial foundations undermined, and lost more than half of its territory.

== Background ==
=== Mexico after independence from Spain ===
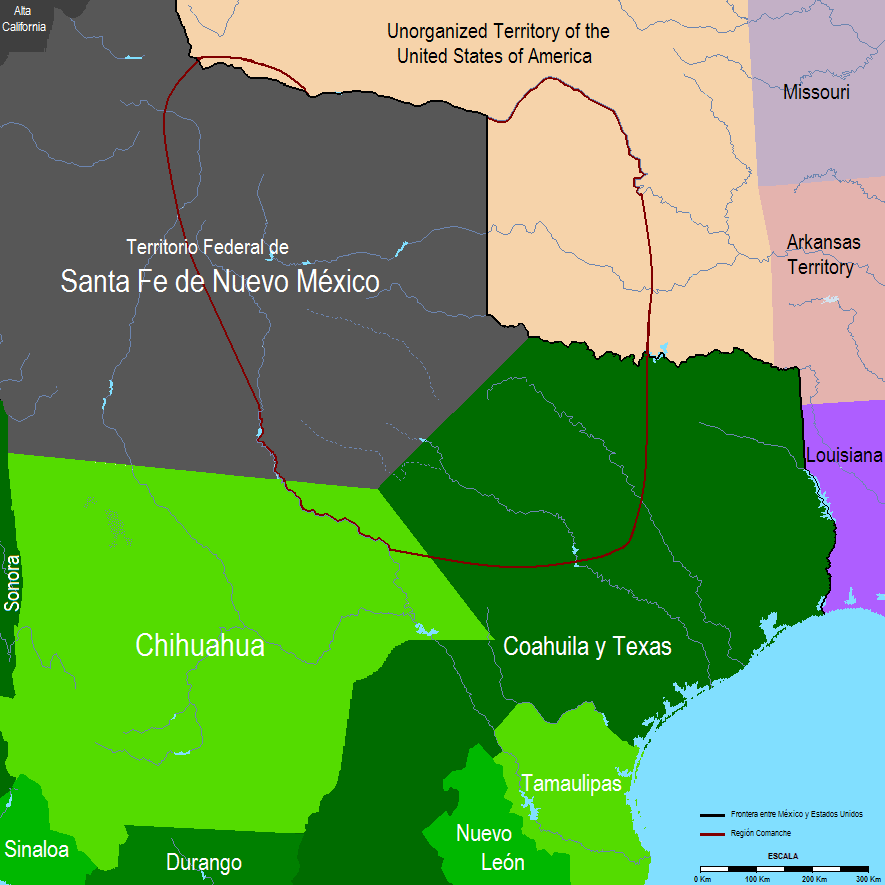
The 1832 boundaries of Comancheria, the Comanche people’s historic homeland

Mexico obtained independence from Spain’s Spanish Empire with the Treaty of Córdoba in 1821 after a decade of conflict between the Spanish royal army and Mexican insurgents for independence, with no foreign intervention. The conflict ruined the silver-mining districts of Zacatecas and Guanajuato. Mexico began as a sovereign nation with its future financial stability from its main export destroyed. Mexico briefly experimented with monarchy, but became a republic in 1824. This government was characterized by instability, and it was ill-prepared for a major international conflict when war broke out with the U.S. in 1846. Mexico had successfully resisted Spanish attempts to be reconquered in the 1820s and resisted the French in the so-called Pastry War of 1838 but the secessionists' success in Texas and the Yucatán against the centralist government of Mexico showed its political weakness as the government changed hands multiple times. The Mexican military and the Catholic Church in Mexico, both privileged institutions with conservative political views, were stronger politically than the Mexican state.

=== U.S. expansionism ===
The United States' 1803 Louisiana Purchase resulted in an undefined border between Spanish colonial territories and the U.S. Some of the boundary issues between the U.S. and Spain were resolved with the Adams-Onís Treaty of 1818. U.S. negotiator John Quincy Adams wanted clear possession of East Florida and establishment of U.S. claims above the 42nd parallel, while Spain sought to limit U.S. expansion into what is now the American Southwest. The U.S. sought to purchase territory from Mexico, starting in 1825, in order to settle some of these issues. Seventh U.S. President Andrew Jackson made a sustained effort to acquire northern Mexican territory, with no success.

Historian Peter Guardino states that,"the greatest advantage the United States had was its prosperity." With the Industrial Revolution across the Atlantic increasing the demand for cotton for textile factories, there was a large external market for cotton produced by enslaved African-American labor in the southern states. This demand helped fuel expansion into northern Mexico. Although there were political conflicts in the U.S., they were largely contained by the framework of the constitution and did not result in revolution or rebellion by 1846, but rather in sectional political conflicts. Northerners in the U.S. sought to develop the country's existing resources and expand the industrial sector without expanding the nation's territory. The existing balance of sectional interests would be disrupted by the expansion of slavery into new territory. Due to Jacksonian ideals, the Democratic Party, to which eleventh President James K Polk belonged, in particular had strongly supported U.S. expansion.

Historian Rachel John argues that Americans and the United States government viewed this opportunity through an ideological lens. As a new nation seen as an experiment, the United States sought to gain prestige and demonstrate its power. Mexico's failure to control its territory—such as its inability to maintain control over Texas—made it vulnerable and viewed as a target. With a stronger military capability, the United States was in a position of power, enabling it to fulfill these ideological goals.

Guardino argues racial and gender-based stereotypes against the Mexicans, such as their being displayed as more feminine compared to the Americans' sense of masculinity and superiority over the Mexicans, contributed to the war and the ideals of American expansionism.

=== Instability in northern Mexico ===
Comanches of West Texas in war regalia, c. 1830

Neither colonial Mexico nor the newly sovereign Mexican state effectively controlled Mexico's far north and west. Mexico's military and diplomatic capabilities declined after it attained independence from Spain in 1821 and left the northern half of the country vulnerable to attacks by Comanche, Apache, and Navajo American Indians. The Comanche, in particular, took advantage of the weakness of the Mexican nation to undertake large-scale raids hundreds of miles into the country to acquire livestock for their own use and to supply an expanding market in Texas and the U.S.

The northern area of Mexico was sparsely settled because of its challenging climate and topography. Mostly high desert with scarce rainfall, it supported little sedentary agriculture during the pre-Hispanic and colonial periods. After independence, Mexico became preoccupied with internal struggles that sometimes verged on civil war, and the worsening situation on the northern frontier was largely neglected. In northern Mexico, the end of Spanish rule was marked by the end of financing for garrisoned presidios and the pay-offs to American Indians to maintain peace. In the absence of effective governance, Comanche and Apache took to raiding for livestock and looted much of the northern countryside outside of the scattered towns. The raids after 1821 resulted in many deaths, halted most transportation and communications, and decimated the ranching industry that was a mainstay of the northern economy. As a result, the demoralized civilian population of northern Mexico put up little resistance to the invading U.S. army.

Furthermore, distance and hostile activity by American Indian tribes made communications and trade between the heartland of Mexico and provinces such as Alta California and New Mexico increasingly difficult. As a result, at the outbreak of the war, New Mexico was economically dependent on trade with the United States via the eastern branch of the Santa Fe Trail. The Mexican government, being overstretched, failed to influence and control its claimed territories. However, it was viewed as a great potential source of wealth by the Mexicans, whilst American settlers believed it was their nation's destiny to claim this land and that its acquisition would secure the United States' position from European colonial empires.

The Mexican government's policy of allowing the settlement of U.S. citizens in its province of Tejas was aimed at expanding control into Comanche lands, the Comancheria. However, rather than settling in the dangerous central and western parts of the province, Anglos preferred to settle in East Texas with its rich farmland contiguous with the southern U.S. slave states. As settlers poured in from the U.S., the Mexican government discouraged further migration with its 1829 abolition of slavery.

=== Foreign designs on California ===
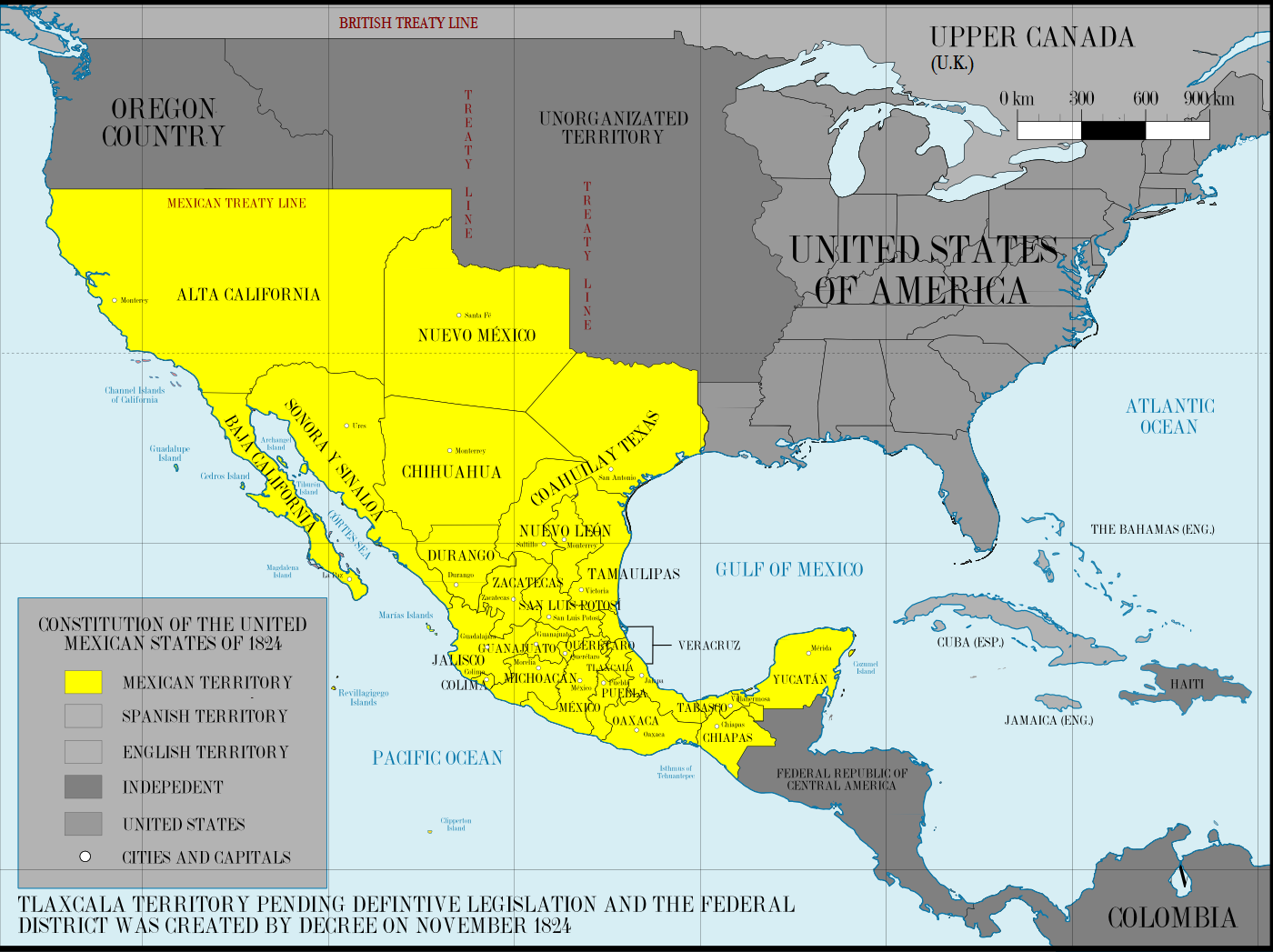
Mexico in 1824 with the boundary line with the U.S. from the 1818 Adams-Onís Treaty that Spain negotiated with the U.S.

During the Spanish colonial era, the Californias (i.e., the Baja California peninsula and Alta California) were sparsely settled. After Mexico became independent, it shut down the missions and reduced its military presence. In 1842, the U.S. minister in Mexico, Waddy Thompson Jr., suggested Mexico might be willing to cede Alta California to the U.S. to settle debts, saying: "As to Texas, I regard it as of very little value compared with California, the richest, the most beautiful, and the healthiest country in the world ... with the acquisition of Upper California we should have the same ascendency on the Pacific ... France and England both have had their eyes upon it."

U.S. President John Tyler's administration suggested a tripartite pact to settle the Oregon boundary dispute and provide for the cession of the port of San Francisco from Mexico. Lord Aberdeen declined to participate but said Britain had no objection to U.S. territorial acquisition there. The British minister in Mexico, Richard Pakenham, wrote in 1841 to Lord Palmerston urging "to establish an English population in the magnificent Territory of Upper California," saying that "no part of the World offering greater natural advantages for the establishment of an English colony ... by all means desirable ... that California, once ceasing to belong to Mexico, should not fall into the hands of any power but England ... there is some reason to believe that daring and adventurous speculators in the United States have already turned their thoughts in this direction." By the time the letter reached London, though, Sir Robert Peel's Tory government, with its Little England policy, had come to power and rejected the proposal as expensive and a potential source of conflict.

Pío Pico, the last governor of Alta California, advocated that California achieve independence from Mexico and become a British protectorate.

=== California battle and change in governorship ===
In 1842, Mexico forcibly replaced California Governor Juan Bautista Alvarado with Manuel Micheltorena. Micheltorena was sent up from lower Mexico, along with an army, that had largely been recruited from Mexico's worst jails. The Californios resented this, partly because California had previously been governed by native-born Californios, partly because Micheltorena's policies were unpopular, and also because the soldiers in Micheltorena's army got a reputation for spending much of their time stealing the local Californios' chickens. Women were not considered safe from the depredations of Micheltorena's army.

Former Governor Alvarado organized a revolt in 1845, which culminated in the Battle of Providencia in Cahuenga Pass near Los Angeles. As a result of the actions of pioneer California rancher John Marsh, Micheltorena's forces were defeated.

=== Texas revolution, republic, and U.S. annexation ===
The Republic of Texas: The present-day outlines of the individual U.S. states are superimposed on the boundaries of 1836–1845.

In 1800, Spain's colonial province of Texas (Tejas) had few inhabitants, with only about 7,000 white settlers. The Spanish crown developed a policy of European colonization to more effectively control the territory. After independence, the Mexican government implemented the policy, granting Moses Austin, a banker from Missouri, a large tract of land in Texas. Austin died before he could bring his plan of recruiting American settlers for the land to fruition, but his son, Stephen F. Austin, brought over 300 American families into Texas. This started the steady trend of migration from the United States into the Texas frontier. Austin's colony was the most successful of several colonies authorized by the Mexican government. The Mexican government intended the new settlers to act as a buffer between the Tejano residents and the Comanches, but the non-Hispanic colonists tended to settle in areas with decent farmland and trade connections with Louisiana rather than farther west where they would have been an effective buffer against the Indian tribes.

In 1829, because of the large influx of American settlers, the non-Hispanic population outnumbered the Hispanic population in Texas. President Vicente Guerrero, a hero of Mexican independence, moved to gain more control over Texas and its influx of non-Hispanic colonists from the southern U.S. and discourage further immigration by abolishing slavery in Mexico. The Mexican government also decided to reinstate the property tax and increase tariffs on shipped American goods. The settlers and many Mexican businessmen in the region rejected the demands, which led to Mexico closing Texas to additional immigration, which continued regardless from the United States into Texas illegally.

In 1834, Mexican conservatives seized the political initiative, and General Antonio López de Santa Anna became the centralist president of Mexico. The conservative-dominated Congress abandoned the federal system, replacing it with a unitary central government that removed power from the states. Leaving politics to those in Mexico City, General Santa Anna led the Mexican army to quash the semi-independence of Texas. He had done that in Coahuila (in 1824, Mexico had merged Texas and Coahuila into the enormous state of Coahuila y Tejas). Texan settlers were threatened by abolitionist states and nations, such as Great Britain. The possibility of ending slavery threatened the political and social fabric of Texas and other slaveholding States in America.

Austin called Texians to arms, and they declared independence from Mexico in 1836. After Santa Anna defeated the Texians in the Battle of the Alamo that March, he was defeated by the Texian Army commanded by General Sam Houston and was captured at the Battle of San Jacinto in April. In exchange for his life, Santa Anna signed a treaty with Texan President David Burnet ending the war and recognizing Texian independence. The treaty was not ratified by the Mexican Congress, as it had been signed by a captive under duress. Although Mexico refused to recognize Texian independence, Texas consolidated its status as an independent republic and received official recognition from Britain, France, and the United States, which all advised Mexico not to try to reconquer the new nation. Most Texians wanted to join the United States, but the annexation of Texas was contentious in the U.S. Congress, where Whigs and Abolitionists opposed the addition of another slave state. Southern Americans who held influence and government officials saw Texas as an opportunity to open markets for northerners and a place to produce goods. Southern planters wanted to create and ensure a Southern empire of slavery; for them, upholding Texas's status as a slave state was important. In 1845, Texas agreed to the offer of annexation by the U.S. Congress and became the 28th state on December 29, 1845, which set the stage for the conflict with Mexico.

== Prelude ==
=== Nueces Strip ===
By the Treaties of Velasco made after Texans captured General Santa Anna after the Battle of San Jacinto, the southern border of Texas was placed at the "Rio Grande del Norte." The Texans claimed this placed the southern border at the modern Rio Grande. The Mexican government disputed this placement on two grounds: first, it rejected the idea of Texas independence; and second, it claimed that the Rio Grande in the treaty was actually the Nueces River, since the current Rio Grande has always been called "Rio Bravo" in Mexico. The latter claim belied the full name of the river in Mexico, however: "Rio Bravo del Norte." The ill-fated Texan Santa Fe Expedition of 1841 attempted to realize the claim to New Mexican territory east of the Rio Grande, but its members were captured by the Mexican Army and imprisoned. Reference to the Rio Grande boundary of Texas was omitted from the U.S. Congress's annexation resolution to help secure passage after the annexation treaty failed in the Senate. President Polk claimed the Rio Grande boundary, and when Mexico sent forces over the Rio Grande, this provoked a dispute.

=== Polk's actions ===
In July 1845, Polk sent General Zachary Taylor to Texas, and by October, Taylor commanded 3,500 Americans on the Nueces River, ready to take the disputed land by force. At the same time, President Polk wrote to the American consul in the Mexican territory of Alta California, disclaiming American ambitions in California but offering to support independence from Mexico or voluntary accession to the United States, and warning that the United States would oppose any European attempts to take over.

To end another war scare with the United Kingdom over the Oregon Country, Polk signed the Oregon Treaty dividing the territory, angering Northern Democrats who felt he was prioritizing Southern expansion over Northern expansion.

In late 1845, a 62-man exploring and mapping expedition sent by Polk under the command of U.S. Army Brevet Captain John C. Frémont entered California. Early in 1846, Frémont visited American Consul Thomas O. Larkin in Monterey. California's Commandante General José Castro became alarmed and ordered him to leave. Frémont acted provocatively by encamping his party on nearby Gavilan Peak and raising the American flag. Larkin sent word that Frémont's actions were counterproductive. Under a threat of military confrontation, Frémont then in March moved his group out of California into Oregon Country. He was followed into Oregon by U.S. Marine Lt. Archibald H. Gillespie who had been sent by Polk from Washington with a secret message for Larkin and instructions to share the message with Frémont. Gillespie reached Frémont in early May. Frémont then returned to the Sacramento Valley and set up camp near Sutter Buttes, where he supported the nascent Bear Flag Revolt that occurred in June 1846 in Sonoma. In July 1846, most of the Bear Flag rebels joined Fremont's men to form the California Battalion.

In November 1845, Polk sent John Slidell, a secret representative, to Mexico City with an offer to the Mexican government of $25 million for the Rio Grande border in Texas and Mexico's provinces of Alta California and Santa Fe de Nuevo México. U.S. expansionists wanted California to thwart any British interests in the area and to gain a port on the Pacific Ocean. Polk authorized Slidell to forgive the $3 million owed to U.S. citizens for damages caused by the Mexican War of Independence and pay another $25 to $30 million for the two territories.

=== Mexico's response ===
Mexico was neither inclined nor able to negotiate. In 1846 alone, the presidency changed hands four times, the war ministry six times, and the finance ministry sixteen times. Despite that, Mexican public opinion and all political factions agreed that selling the territories to the United States would tarnish the national honor. Mexicans who opposed direct conflict with the United States, including President José Joaquín de Herrera, were viewed as traitors. Military opponents of de Herrera, supported by populist newspapers, considered Slidell's presence in Mexico City an insult. When de Herrera considered receiving Slidell to settle the problem of Texas annexation peacefully, he was accused of treason and deposed. After a more nationalistic government under General Mariano Paredes y Arrillaga came to power, it publicly reaffirmed Mexico's claim to Texas.

== Preparation for war ==
=== Challenges in Mexico ===
==== Mexican Army ====
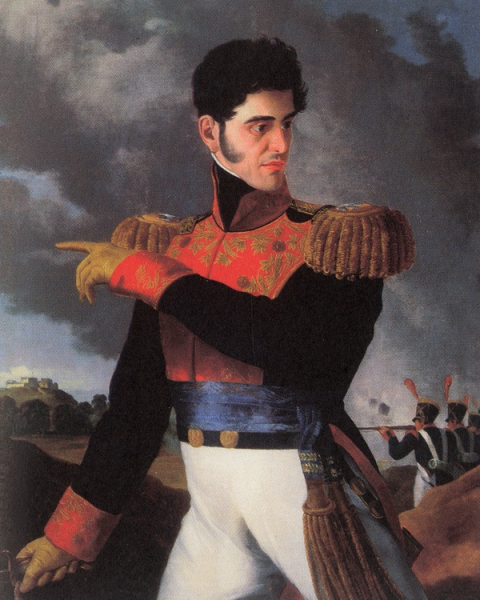
General Antonio López de Santa Anna was a military hero who became president of Mexico on multiple occasions. The Mexican Army's intervention in politics was an ongoing issue during much of the mid-nineteenth century.

The Mexican Army was a weak and divided force. Only 7 of the 19 states that formed the Mexican federation sent soldiers, armament, and money for the war effort. Many leaders expressed their concern for the country, including Santa Anna who stated that, "The leaders of the army did their best to train the rough men who volunteered, but they could do little to inspire them with patriotism for the glorious country they were honored to serve." According to the leading Mexican conservative politician, Lucas Alamán, the "money spent on arming Mexican troops merely enabled them to fight each other and 'give the illusion' that the country possessed an army for its defense." However, an officer criticized Santa Anna's training of troops, "The cavalry was drilled only in regiments. The artillery hardly ever maneuvered and never fired a blank shot. The general in command was never present on the field of maneuvers, so that he was unable to appreciate the respective qualities of the various bodies under his command ... If any meetings of the principal commanding officers were held to discuss the operations of the campaign, it was not known, nor was it known whether any plan of campaign had been formed."

At the beginning of the war, Mexican forces were divided between the permanent forces (permanentes) and the active militiamen (activos). The permanent forces consisted of 12 regiments of infantry (of two battalions each), three brigades of artillery, eight regiments of cavalry, one separate squadron and a brigade of dragoons. The militia amounted to nine infantry and six cavalry regiments. In the northern territories, presidial companies (presidiales) protected the scattered settlements.

The Mexican army was using surplus British muskets (such as the Brown Bess), left over from the Napoleonic Wars. While at the beginning of the war most American soldiers were still equipped with the very similar Springfield 1816 flintlock muskets, more reliable caplock models became increasingly popular as the conflict progressed. Some U.S. troops carried more modern weapons that gave them a significant advantage over their Mexican counterparts, such as the Springfield 1841 rifle of the Mississippi Rifles and the Colt Paterson revolver of the Texas Rangers. In the later stages of the war, the U.S. Mounted Rifles were issued Colt Walker revolvers, of which the U.S. Army had ordered 1,000 in 1846. Most significantly, throughout the war, the superiority of the U.S. artillery often carried the day.

In his 1885 memoirs, former U.S. President Ulysses Grant, a veteran of the Mexican war, attributed Mexico's defeat to the poor quality of their army, writing:

"The Mexican army of that day was hardly an organization. The private soldier was picked from the lower class of the inhabitants when wanted; his consent was not asked; he was poorly clothed, worse fed, and seldom paid. He was turned adrift when no longer wanted. The officers of the lower grades were but little superior to the men. With all this I have seen as brave stands made by some of these men as I have ever seen made by soldiers. Now Mexico has a standing army larger than the United States. They have a military school modeled after West Point. Their officers are educated and, no doubt, very brave. The Mexican war of 1846–48 would be an impossibility in this generation."

==== Political divisions ====
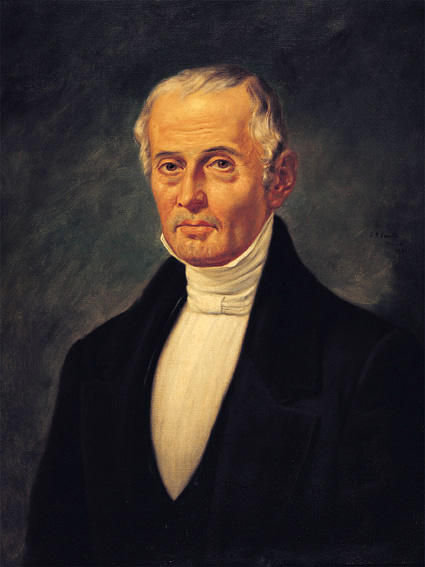
Liberal Valentín Gómez Farías, who served as Santa Anna's vice president and implemented a liberal reform in 1833, was an important political player in the era of the Mexican–American War.

There were significant political divisions in Mexico which seriously impeded the war effort. Inside Mexico, the conservative centralistas and liberal federalists vied for power, and at times these two factions inside Mexico's military fought each other rather than the invading U.S. Army. Santa Anna bitterly remarked, "However shameful it may be to admit this, we have brought this disgraceful tragedy upon ourselves through our interminable in-fighting."

During the conflict, presidents held office for a period of months, sometimes just weeks, or even days. Just before the outbreak of the war, liberal General José Joaquín de Herrera was president (December 1844 – December 1845) and willing to engage in talks so long as he did not appear to be caving to the U.S., but he was accused by many Mexican factions of selling out his country (vendepatria) for considering it. He was overthrown by Conservative Mariano Paredes (December 1845 – July 1846), who left the presidency to fight the invading U.S. Army and was replaced by his vice president Nicolás Bravo (July 28, 1846 – August 4, 1846). The conservative Bravo was overthrown by federalist liberals who re-established the federal Constitution of 1824. José Mariano Salas (August 6, 1846 – December 23, 1846) served as president and held elections under the restored federalist system. General Antonio López de Santa Anna won those elections, but as was his practice, he left the administration to his vice president, who was again liberal Valentín Gómez Farías (December 23, 1846 – March 21, 1847). In February 1847, conservatives rebelled against the liberal government's attempt to take Church property to fund the war effort. In the Revolt of the Polkos, the Catholic Church and conservatives paid soldiers to rise against the liberal government. Santa Anna had to leave his campaign to return to the capital to sort out the political mess.

Santa Anna briefly held the presidency again, from March 21, 1847 – April 2, 1847. His troops were deprived of support that would allow them to continue the fight. The conservatives demanded the removal of Gómez Farías, and this was accomplished by abolishing the office of vice president. Santa Anna returned to the field, replaced in the presidency by Pedro María de Anaya (April 2 – May 20, 1847). Santa Anna returned to the presidency on May 20, 1847, when Anaya left to fight the invasion, serving until September 15, 1847. Preferring the battlefield to administration, Santa Anna left office again, leaving the office to Manuel de la Peña y Peña (September 16 – November 13, 1847).

With U.S. forces occupying the Mexican capital and much of the heartland, negotiating a peace treaty was an exigent matter, and Peña y Peña left office to do that. Pedro María Anaya returned to the presidency on November 13, 1847 – January 8, 1848. Anaya refused to sign any treaty that ceded land to the U.S., despite the situation on the ground with Americans occupying the capital. Peña y Peña resumed the presidency January 8, 1848 – June 3, 1848, during which time the Treaty of Guadalupe Hidalgo was signed, bringing the war to an end.

==== Raids by Native Mexicans ====
Indigenous populations in Mexico played a crucial role in the defense of their land. By the beginning of the war, indigenous populations were depleted of their natural resources due to an influx of settlers. It didn't help that indigenous soldiers who volunteered to fight with the Mexican Army were often abandoned and compensated unfairly.

As a result, indigenous populations from the Great Plains region raided American and Mexican settlements in order to survive. By raiding, indigenous populations were also able to acquire horses and properly tame them to move efficiently during battles. Captive-taking methods, especially that of the Comanche tribe, were also used, as captives would end up assisting indigenous populations in raids against Mexican or American forces.

=== Challenges in the United States ===
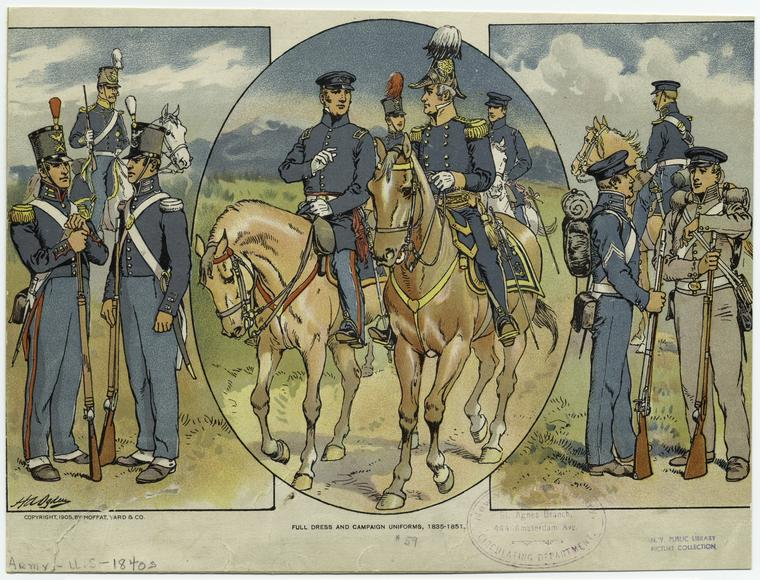
U.S. Army full dress and campaign uniforms, 1835–1851

==== United States Army ====
Polk had pledged to seek expanded territory in Oregon and Texas, as part of his campaign in 1844, but the regular army was not sufficiently large to sustain extended conflicts on two fronts. The Oregon dispute with Britain was settled peaceably by treaty, allowing U.S. forces to concentrate on the southern border.

The war was fought by regiments of regulars bolstered by various regiments, battalions, and companies of volunteers from the different states of the Union, as well as Americans and some Mexicans in California and New Mexico. In general, the Regular Army officers looked down on the volunteers, whose training was poor and whose behavior was undisciplined. (see below)

On the West Coast, the U.S. Navy fielded a battalion of sailors, in an attempt to recapture Los Angeles. Although the U.S. Army and Navy were not large at the outbreak of the war, the officers were generally well trained and the numbers of enlisted men fairly large compared to Mexico's. At the beginning of the war, the U.S. Army had eight regiments of infantry (three battalions each), four artillery regiments and three mounted regiments (two dragoons, one of mounted rifles). These regiments were supplemented by 10 new regiments (nine of infantry and one of cavalry) raised for one year of service by the act of Congress from February 11, 1847. A large portion of this fighting force consisted of recent immigrants. According to Tyler V. Johnson, foreign-born men amounted to 47 percent of General Taylor's total forces. In addition to a large contingent of Irish- and German-born soldiers, nearly all European states and principalities were represented. It is estimated that the U.S. Army further included 1,500 men from British North America, including French Canadians.

Although Polk hoped to avoid a protracted war over Texas, the extended conflict stretched regular army resources, necessitating the recruitment of volunteers with short-term enlistments. Some enlistments were for a year, but others were for 3 or 6 months. The best volunteers signed up for a year's service in the summer of 1846, with their enlistments expiring just when General Winfield Scott's campaign was poised to capture Mexico City. Many did not re-enlist, deciding that they would rather return home than place themselves in harm's way of disease, threat of death or injury on the battlefield, or in guerrilla warfare. Their patriotism was doubted by some in the U.S., but they were not counted as deserters. The volunteers were far less disciplined than the regular army, with many committing attacks on the civilian population, sometimes stemming from anti-Catholic and anti-Mexican racial bias. Soldiers' memoirs describe cases of looting and murder of Mexican civilians, mostly by volunteers. One officer's diary records: "We reached Burrita about 5 pm, many of the Louisiana volunteers were there, a lawless drunken rabble. They had driven away the inhabitants, taken possession of their houses, and were emulating each other in making beasts of themselves." John L. O'Sullivan, a vocal proponent of Manifest Destiny, later recalled "The regulars regarded the volunteers with importance and contempt ... [The volunteers] robbed Mexicans of their cattle and corn, stole their fences for firewood, got drunk, and killed several inoffensive inhabitants of the town in the streets." Many of the volunteers were unwanted and considered poor soldiers. The expression "Just like Gaines's army" came to refer to something useless, the phrase having originated when a group of untrained and unwilling Louisiana troops was rejected and sent back by General Taylor at the beginning of the war.

In his 1885 memoirs, Ulysses Grant assesses the U.S. armed forces facing Mexico more favorably.

The victories in Mexico were, in every instance, over vastly superior numbers. There were two reasons for this. Both General Scott and General Taylor had such armies as are not often got together. At the battles of Palo Alto and Resaca-de-la-Palma, General Taylor had a small army, but it was composed exclusively of regular troops, under the best of drill and discipline. Every officer, from the highest to the lowest, was educated in his profession, not at West Point necessarily, but in the camp, in garrison, and many of them in wars with Natives. The rank and file were probably inferior, as material out of which to make an army, to the volunteers that participated in all the later battles of the war; but they were brave men, and then drill and discipline brought out all there was in them. A better army, man for man, probably never faced an enemy than the one commanded by General Taylor in the earliest two engagements of the Mexican war. The volunteers who followed were of better material, but without drill or discipline at the start. They were associated with so many disciplined men and professionally educated officers, that when they went into engagements it was with a confidence they would not have felt otherwise. They became soldiers themselves almost at once. All these conditions we would enjoy again in case of war.

==== Political divisions ====
The U.S. had been an independent country since the American Revolution, but it was a country that was strongly divided along sectional lines, especially in regard to slavery. Enlarging the country, particularly through armed combat against a sovereign nation, deepened those sectional divisions. Polk had narrowly won the popular vote in the 1844 presidential election and decisively won the Electoral College, but with the annexation of Texas in 1845 and the outbreak of war in 1846, Polk's Democrats lost the House of Representatives to the Whig Party, which opposed the war. Unlike Mexico, which had weak formal state institutions, chaotic changes in government, and a military that regularly intervened in politics, the U.S. generally kept its political divisions within the bounds of the institutions of governance.

== Role of women ==
=== Contributions from Mexican women ===
==== On the battlefield ====
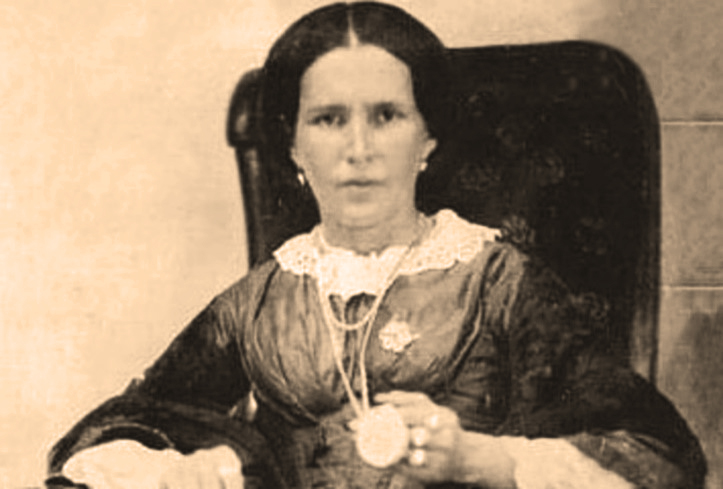
María Josefa Zozaya was a Mexican woman who aided wounded and ill troops of both the American and Mexican armies during the War.

Since Mexico fought the war on its home territory, a traditional support system for troops were women, known as soldaderas. They did not participate in conventional fighting on battlefields, but some soldaderas joined the battle alongside the men. These women were involved in fighting during the defense of Mexico City and Monterrey. On the other hand, some Mexican women were seen as "angels", as they provided aid and comfort to the injured men on both sides. Some women such as Doña Jesús Dosamantes and María Josefa Zozaya would be remembered as heroines.

==== On the home front ====
Although soldaderas were able to prove the abilities Mexican women had outside of the private sphere, Mexican women on the home front still contributed to the war effort. After having to face the losses in their country, Mexican women were seen dressed in black and creating somber paintings.

=== Contributions from American women ===
==== On the battlefield ====
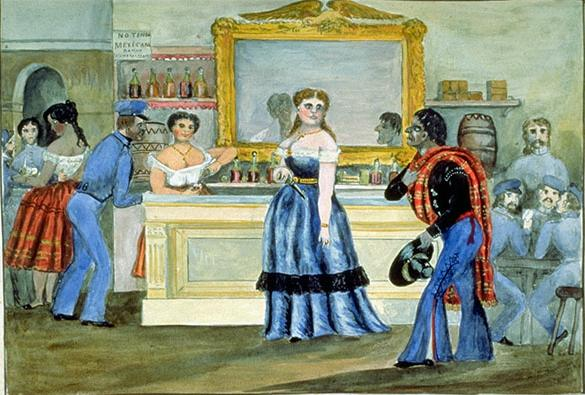
Sarah A Bowman was an American woman, that during the war operated an inn in Franklin, Texas (now El Paso, Texas) before settling near Arizona City, Arizona (now Yuma, Arizona).

American and Mexican women shared the similarities of providing their domestic services on the battlefield. Among the most notable American women on the battlefield was Sarah Bowman. She was often seen delivering food, carrying wounded soldiers, and in close combat.

==== On the home front ====
In Mexico
While their husbands enlisted, many American women stayed in Mexico to tend to oversee their business, making themselves factory women. However, factory woman Ann Chase was willing enough to become a spy for U.S. forces in order to protect her home and business in the absence of her husband.

In the U.S.
Just as Mexican women contributed to the war efforts from their homes, women in the U.S. similarly protested publicly and made patriotic crafts that U.S. soldiers could carry. In addition, female journalists across multiple states took advantage of their literacy to speak up in support or in opposition of the war, including Anne Royall, Jane Swisshelm, and Jane Cazneau. Female American journalists played a crucial role in representing the voices of women that had been silenced within the public sphere.

== Outbreak of hostilities ==
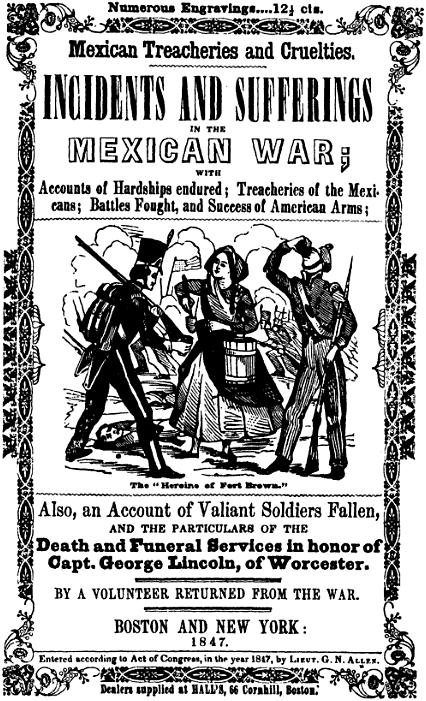
Sarah A. Bowman "The Great Western," depicted as the Heroine of Fort Brown. At her death, she was buried with full military honors.

=== Texas campaign ===
==== Thornton Affair ====
President Polk ordered General Taylor and his forces south to the Rio Grande. Taylor ignored Mexican demands to withdraw to the Nueces. He constructed a makeshift fort (later known as Fort Brown/Fort Texas) on the banks of the Rio Grande opposite the city of Matamoros, Tamaulipas.

The Mexican forces prepared for war, and Parades issued a declaration of a defensive war on April 23. On April 25, 1846, a 2,000-man Mexican cavalry detachment attacked a 70-man U.S. patrol commanded by Captain Seth Thornton, which had been sent into the contested territory north of the Rio Grande and south of the Nueces River. In the Thornton Affair, the Mexican cavalry routed the patrol, killing 11 American soldiers and capturing 52.

==== Siege of Fort Texas ====
A few days after the Thornton Affair, the siege of Fort Texas began on May 3, 1846. Mexican artillery at Matamoros opened fire on Fort Texas, which replied with its own guns. The bombardment continued for 160 hours and expanded as Mexican forces gradually surrounded the fort. Thirteen U.S. soldiers were injured during the bombardment, and two were killed. Among the dead was Jacob Brown, after whom the fort was later named.

==== Battle of Palo Alto ====
On May 8, 1846, Zachary Taylor and 2,400 troops arrived to relieve the fort. However, General Arista rushed north with a force of 3,400 and intercepted him about 5 miles (8 km) north of the Rio Grande River, near modern-day Brownsville, Texas. The U.S. Army employed "flying artillery," their term for horse artillery, a mobile light artillery mounted on horse carriages with the entire crew riding horses into battle. The Mexicans replied with cavalry skirmishes and their own artillery, but in contrast to the flying artillery of the Americans, the Mexican cannons at the Battle of Palo Alto had lower-quality gunpowder that fired at velocities slow enough to make it possible for American soldiers to dodge artillery rounds. The U.S. flying artillery somewhat demoralized the Mexican side, and seeking terrain more to their advantage, the Mexicans retreated to the far side of a dry riverbed (resaca) during the night and prepared for the next battle. It provided a natural fortification, but during the retreat, Mexican troops were scattered, making communication difficult.

==== Battle of Resaca de la Palma ====
During the Battle of Resaca de la Palma on May 9, 1846, the two sides engaged in fierce hand-to-hand combat. The U.S. Cavalry managed to capture the Mexican artillery, causing the Mexican side to retreat, which then became a rout. Fighting on unfamiliar terrain, his troops fleeing in retreat, Arista found it impossible to rally his forces. Mexican casualties were significant, and the Mexicans were forced to abandon their artillery and baggage. Fort Brown inflicted additional casualties as the withdrawing troops passed by the fort, and additional Mexican soldiers drowned trying to swim across the Rio Grande. Taylor crossed the Rio Grande and began his series of battles in Mexican territory.

=== Declarations of war, May 1846 ===
Overview map of the war Disputed territory United States territory, 1848 Mexican territory, 1848 After treaty of Guadalupe Hidalgo

Polk received word of the Thornton Affair, which, added to the Mexican government's rejection of Slidell, Polk believed, constituted a casus belli. Polk said in a message to Congress: "The cup of forbearance had been exhausted even before the recent information from the frontier of the Del Norte. But now, after reiterated menaces, Mexico has passed the boundary of the United States, has invaded our territory and shed American blood upon the American soil. She has proclaimed that hostilities have commenced, and that the two nations are now at war."

The U.S. Congress approved the declaration of war on May 13, 1846, after a few hours of debate, with southern Democrats in strong support. Sixty-seven Whigs voted against the war on a key slavery amendment, but on the final passage only fourteen Whigs voted no, including John Quincy Adams. Later, a freshman Whig Congressman from Illinois, Abraham Lincoln, challenged Polk's assertion that American blood had been shed on American soil, calling it "a bold falsification of history."

Regarding the beginning of the war, Ulysses S. Grant, who had opposed the war but served as an army lieutenant in Taylor's army, claims in his Personal Memoirs (1885) that the main goal of the U.S. Army's advance from Nueces River to the Rio Grande was to provoke the outbreak of war without attacking first, to debilitate any political opposition to the war.

The presence of United States troops on the edge of the disputed territory farthest from the Mexican settlements, was not sufficient to provoke hostilities. We were sent to provoke a fight, but it was essential that Mexico should commence it. It was very doubtful whether Congress would declare war; but if Mexico should attack our troops, the Executive could announce, "Whereas, war exists by the acts of, etc.", and prosecute the contest with vigor. Once initiated there were, but few public men who would have the courage to oppose it. ... Mexico showing no willingness to come to the Nueces to drive the invaders from her soil, it became necessary for the "invaders" to approach to within a convenient distance to be struck. Accordingly, preparations were begun for moving the army to the Rio Grande, to a point near Matamoras [sic]. It was desirable to occupy a position near the largest centre of population possible to reach, without absolutely invading territory to which we set up no claim whatever.

In Mexico, although Paredes issued a manifesto on May 23, 1846, and a declaration of a defensive war on April 23, both of which are considered by some the de facto start of the war, the Mexican Congress officially declared war on July 7, 1846.

=== General Santa Anna's return ===
Mexico's defeats at Palo Alto and Resaca de la Palma precipitated the return of Santa Anna. In exile in Cuba at the outbreak of the war, he wrote to the government in Mexico City, stating he did not want to return to the presidency, but was prepared to end his exile and use his military experience to reclaim Texas for Mexico. President Farías was driven to desperation. He accepted the offer and allowed Santa Anna to return. Unbeknownst to Farías, Santa Anna had secretly been dealing with U.S. representatives to discuss a sale of all contested territory to the U.S. at a reasonable price, on the condition that he be allowed back in Mexico through the U.S. naval blockades. Polk sent his own representative to Cuba, Alexander Slidell MacKenzie, to negotiate directly with Santa Anna. The negotiations were secret and there are no written records of the meetings, but there was some understanding that came out of the meetings. Polk asked Congress for $2 million to be used in negotiating a treaty with Mexico. The U.S. allowed Santa Anna to return to Mexico, lifting the Gulf Coast naval blockade. However, in Mexico, Santa Anna denied all knowledge of meeting with the U.S. representative or any offers or transactions. Rather than being Polk's ally, he pocketed any money given him and began to plan the defense of Mexico. The Americans were dismayed, including General Scott, as this was an unexpected result. "Santa Anna gloated over his enemies' naïveté: 'The United States was deceived in believing that I would be capable of betraying my mother country.'" Santa Anna avoided getting involved in politics, dedicating himself to Mexico's military defense. While politicians attempted to reset the governing framework to a federal republic, Santa Anna left for the front to retake lost northern territory. Although Santa Anna was elected president in 1846, he refused to govern, leaving that to his vice president, while he sought to engage with Taylor's forces. With the restored federal republic, some states refused to support the national military campaign led by Santa Anna, who had fought with them directly in the previous decade. Santa Anna urged Vice President Gómez Farías to act as a dictator to get the men and materiel needed for the war. Gómez Farías forced a loan from the Catholic Church, but the funds were not available in time to support Santa Anna's army.

== Reaction in the United States ==
=== Opposition to the war ===
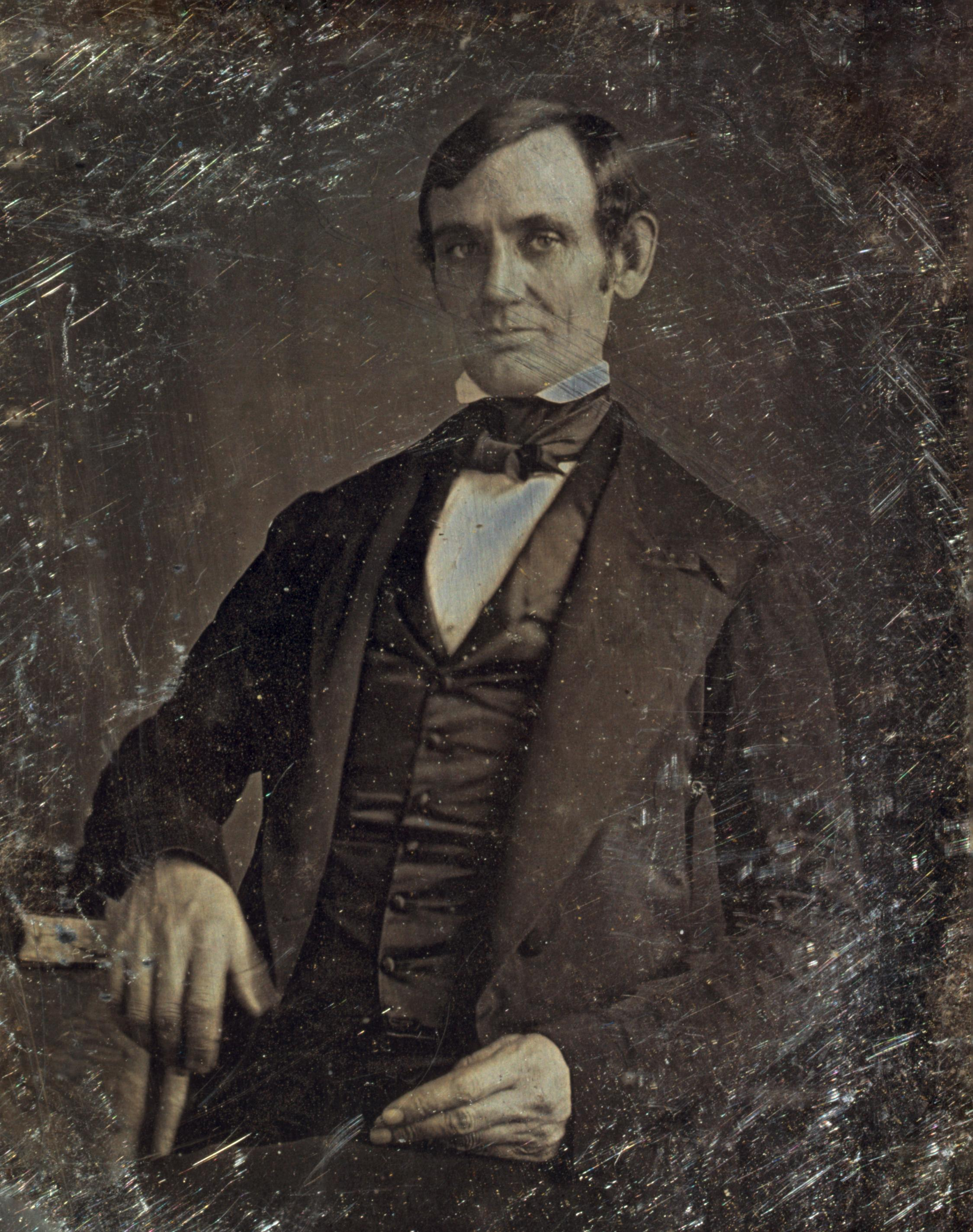
Abraham Lincoln in his late 30s as a Whig member of the U.S. House of Representatives, when he opposed the Mexican–American War. The photo was taken by one of Lincoln's law students around 1846.

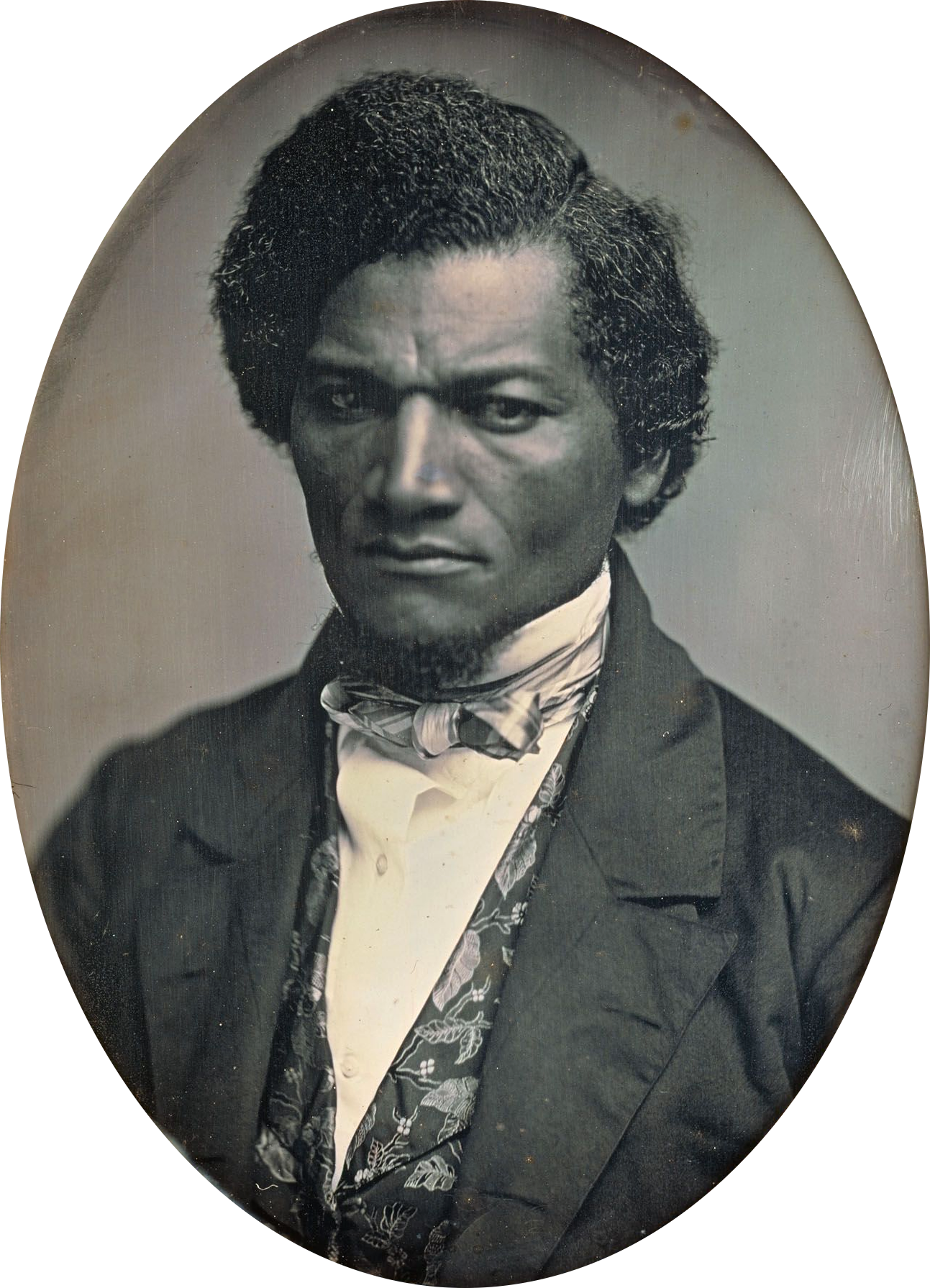
Former slave and Abolitionist advocate Frederick Douglass opposed the Mexican–American War.

In the United States, increasingly divided by sectional rivalry, the war was a partisan issue and an essential element in the origins of the American Civil War. Most Whigs in the North and South opposed it; most Democrats supported it. Southern Democrats, animated by a popular belief in Manifest Destiny, supported it in the hope of adding slave-owning territory to the South and avoiding being outnumbered by the faster-growing North. O'Sullivan, editor of the Democratic Review, coined this phrase in its context, stating that it must be "our manifest destiny to overspread the continent allotted by Providence for the free development of our yearly multiplying millions."

Northern antislavery elements feared the expansion of the Southern Slave Power; Whigs generally wanted to strengthen the economy with industrialization, not expand it with more land. Among the most vocal in opposition to the war in the House of Representatives was former U.S. President Adams of Massachusetts. He had first voiced concerns about expanding into Mexican territory in 1836 when he opposed Texas's annexation following its de facto independence from Mexico. He continued this argument in 1846 for the same reason. War with Mexico would add new slavery territory to the nation. When the question of going to war with Mexico came to a vote on May 13, 1846, Adams spoke a resounding "No!" in the chamber. Only 13 others followed his lead. Despite that opposition, he later voted for war appropriations.

Ex-slave Frederick Douglass opposed the war and was dismayed by the weakness of the anti-war movement. "The determination of our slave-holding president, and the probability of his success in wringing from the people, men, and money to carry it on, is made evident by the puny opposition arrayed against him. None seem willing to take their stand for peace at all risks."

Polk was generally able to manipulate Whigs into supporting appropriations for the war but only once it had already started and then "clouding the situation with a number of false statements about Mexican actions." Not everyone went along. Joshua Giddings led a group of dissenters in Washington D.C. He called the war with Mexico "an aggressive, unholy, and unjust war" and voted against supplying soldiers and weapons. He said: "In the murder of Mexicans upon their own soil, or in robbing them of their country, I can take no part either now or hereafter. The guilt of these crimes must rest on others. I will not participate in them."

Fellow Whig Lincoln contested Polk's causes for the war. Polk had said that Mexico had "shed American blood upon American soil." Lincoln submitted eight "Spot Resolutions," demanding that Polk state the exact spot where Thornton had been attacked and American blood was shed, and to clarify whether that location was American soil or if it had been claimed by Spain and Mexico. Lincoln, too, did not actually stop money for men or supplies in the war effort.

Whig Senator Thomas Corwin of Ohio gave a long speech indicting the presidential war in 1847. In the Senate on February 11, 1847, Whig leader Robert Toombs of Georgia declared: "This war is nondescript ... We charge the President with usurping the war-making power ... with seizing a country ... which had been for centuries, and was then in the possession of the Mexicans. ... Let us put a check upon this lust of dominion. We had territory enough, Heaven knew." Democratic Representative David Wilmot introduced the Wilmot Proviso, which would prohibit slavery in new territory acquired from Mexico. Wilmot's proposal passed the House but not the Senate.

Northern abolitionists attacked the war as an attempt by slave owners to strengthen the grip of slavery and thus ensure their continued influence in the federal government. Prominent artists and writers opposed the war, including James Russell Lowell, whose works on the subject "The Present Crisis" and the satirical The Biglow Papers were immediately popular. Transcendentalist writers Henry David Thoreau and Ralph Waldo Emerson also criticized the war. Thoreau, who served jail time for refusing to pay a tax that would support the war effort, turned a lecture into an essay now known as Civil Disobedience. Emerson was succinct, predicting that, "The United States will conquer Mexico, but it will be as a man who swallowed the arsenic which brings him down in turn. Mexico will poison us." Events proved him right, in a fashion, as arguments over the expansion of slavery in the lands seized from Mexico would fuel the drift to civil war just a dozen years later. The New England Workingmen's Association condemned the war, and some Irish and German immigrants defected from the U.S. Army and formed the Saint Patrick's Battalion to fight for Mexico.

=== Support for the war ===
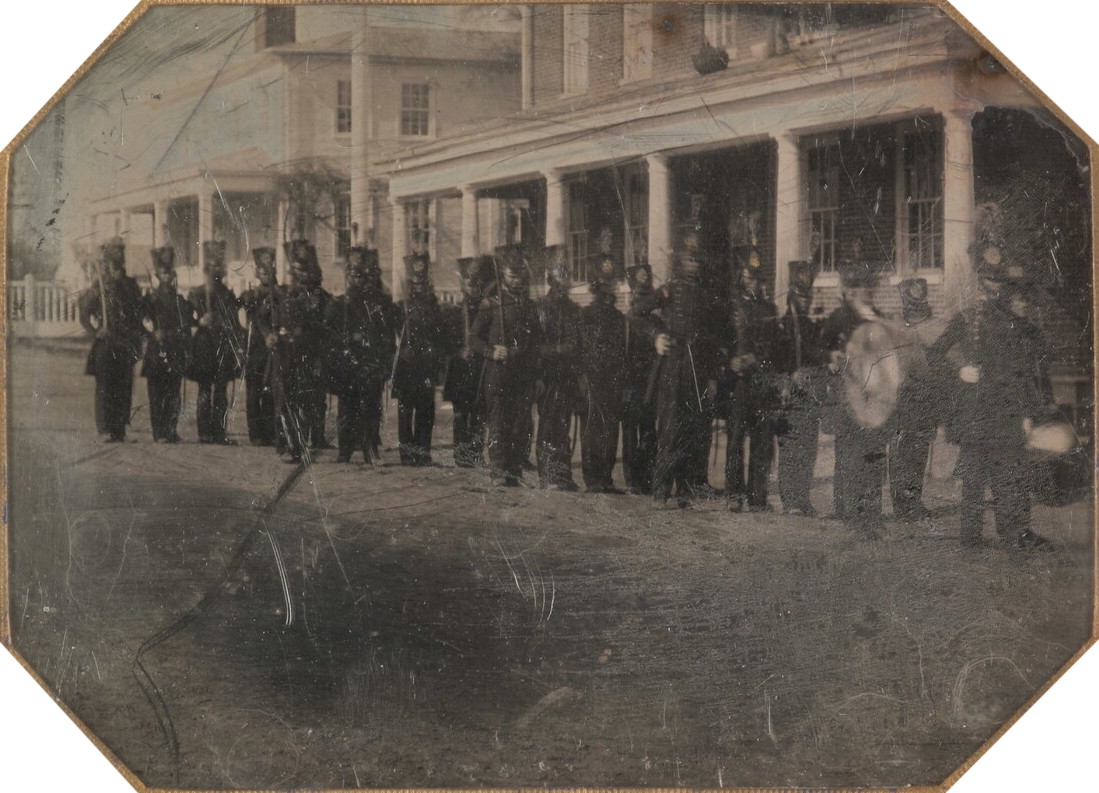
Volunteers leaving for the Mexican War, Exeter, New Hampshire, daguerreotype by E. Punderson, ca.1846

Besides alleging that the actions of Mexican military forces within the disputed boundary lands north of the Rio Grande constituted an attack on American soil, the war's advocates viewed the territories of New Mexico and California as only nominally Mexican possessions with very tenuous ties to Mexico. They saw the territories as unsettled, ungoverned, and unprotected frontier lands, whose non-aboriginal population represented a substantial American component. Moreover, the territories were feared by Americans to be under imminent threat of acquisition by America's rival on the continent, the British.

President Polk reprised these arguments in his Third Annual Message to Congress on December 7, 1847. He scrupulously detailed his administration's position on the origins of the conflict, the measures the U.S. had taken to avoid hostilities, and the justification for declaring war. He also elaborated upon the many outstanding financial claims by American citizens against Mexico and argued that, in view of the country's insolvency, the cession of some large portion of its northern territories was the only indemnity realistically available as compensation. This helped to rally congressional Democrats to his side, ensuring passage of his war measures and bolstering support for the war in the U.S.

=== U.S. journalism during the war ===
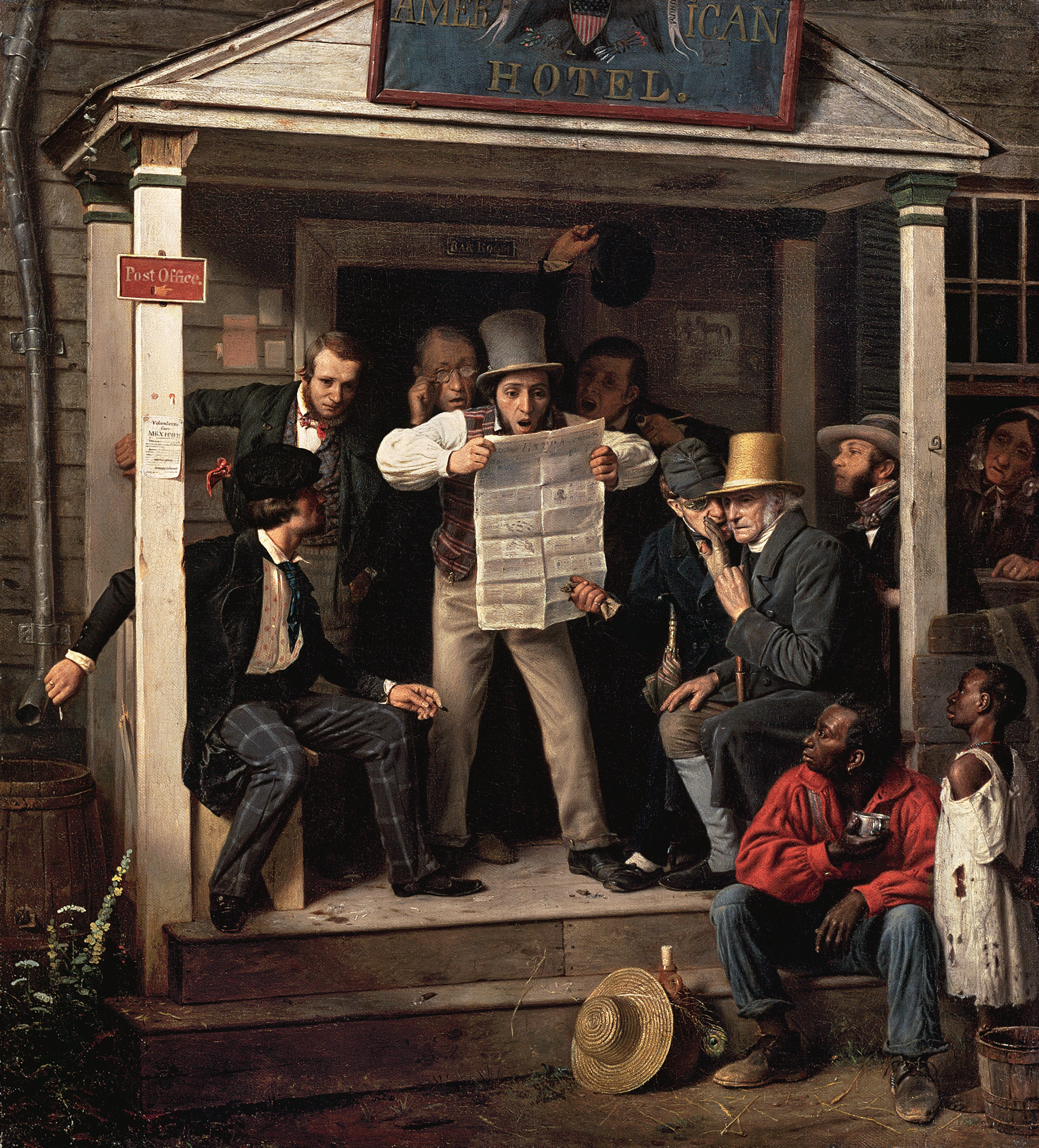
War News from Mexico (1848)

The Mexican–American War was the first U.S. war that was covered by mass media, primarily the penny press, and was the first foreign war covered primarily by U.S. correspondents. Press coverage in the United States was characterized by support for the war and widespread public interest and demand for coverage of the conflict. Mexican coverage of the war (both written by Mexicans and Americans based in Mexico) was affected by press censorship, first by the Mexican government and later by the American military.

Walt Whitman enthusiastically endorsed the war in 1846 and showed his disdainful attitude toward Mexico and boosterism for Manifest Destiny: "What has miserable, inefficient Mexico—with her superstition, her burlesque upon freedom, her actual tyranny by the few over the many—what has she to do with the great mission of peopling the new world with a noble race? Be it ours, to achieve that mission!"

The coverage of the war was an important development in the U.S., with journalists as well as letter-writing soldiers giving the public in the U.S. "their first-ever independent news coverage of warfare from home or abroad." During the war, inventions such as the telegraph created new means of communication that updated people with the latest news from the reporters on the scene. The most important of these was George Wilkins Kendall, a Northerner who wrote for the New Orleans Picayune, and whose collected Dispatches from the Mexican War constitute an important primary source for the conflict. With more than a decade's experience reporting urban crime, the "penny press" realized the public's voracious demand for astounding war news. Moreover, Shelley Streetby demonstrates that the print revolution, which preceded the U.S.–Mexican War, made it possible for the distribution of cheap newspapers throughout the country. This was the first time in U.S. history that accounts by journalists instead of opinions of politicians had great influence in shaping people's opinions about and attitudes toward war. Along with written accounts of the war, war artists provided a visual dimension to the war at the time and immediately afterward. Carl Nebel's visual depictions of the war are well known.

By getting constant reports from the battlefield, Americans became emotionally united as a community. News about the war caused extraordinary popular excitement. In the spring of 1846, news about Taylor's victory at Palo Alto brought up a large crowd that met in the cotton textile town of Lowell, Massachusetts. In Chicago, a large concourse of citizens gathered in April 1847 to celebrate the victory of Buena Vista. New York celebrated the twin victories at Veracruz and Buena Vista in May 1847. Generals Taylor and Scott became heroes for their people and later became presidential candidates. Polk had pledged to be a one-term president, but his last official act was to attend Taylor's inauguration as president.

== U.S. invasions on Mexico's periphery ==
=== New Mexico campaign ===
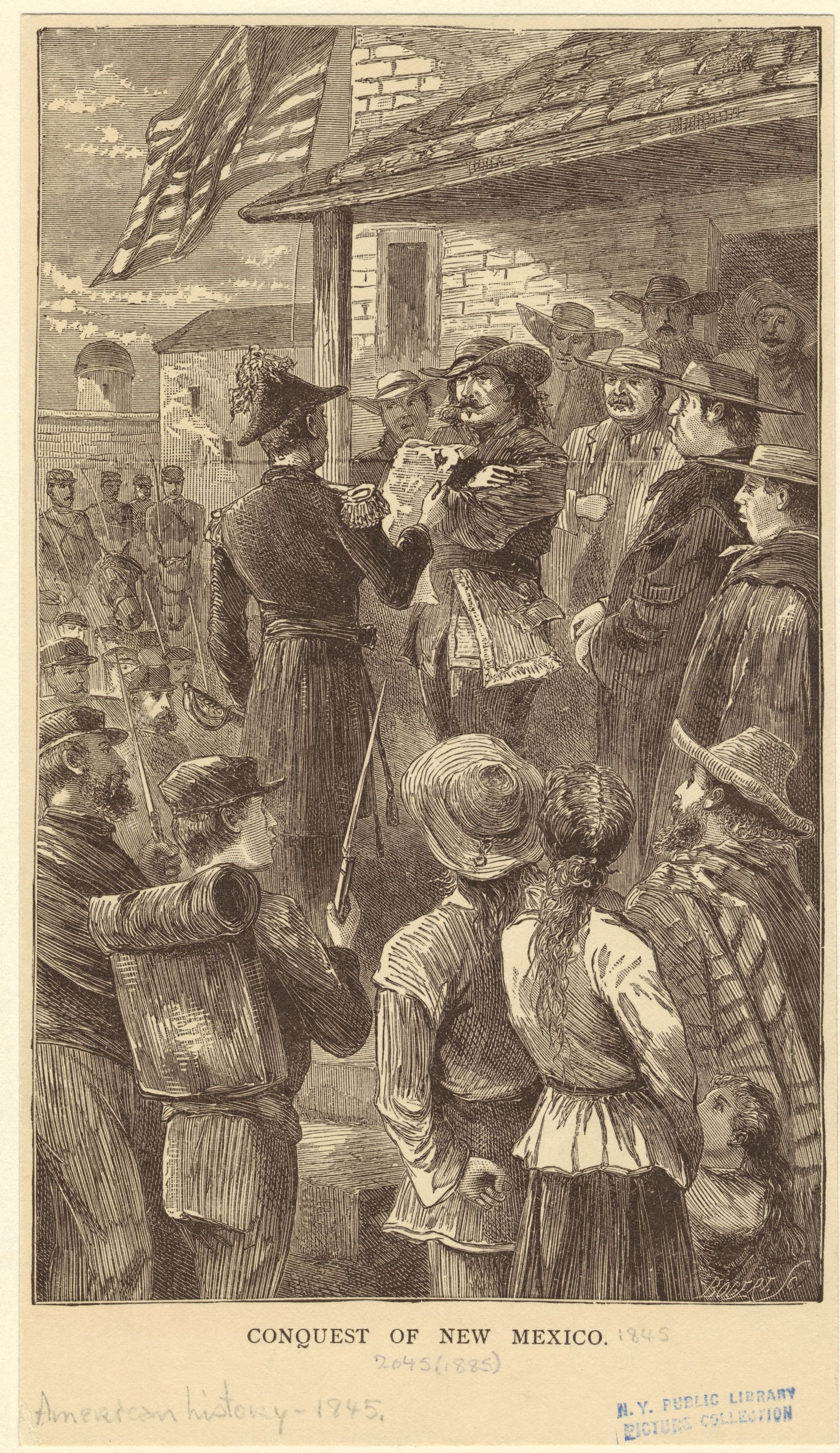
Gen. Kearny's annexation of New Mexico Territory, August 15, 1846.

After the declaration of war on May 13, 1846, United States Army General Stephen W. Kearny moved southwest from Fort Leavenworth, Kansas, in June 1846 with about 1,700 men in his Army of the West. Kearny's orders were to secure the territories Nuevo México and Alta California.

In Santa Fe, Governor Manuel Armijo wanted to avoid battle, but on August 9, Colonel Diego Archuleta and militia officers Manuel Chaves and Miguel Pino forced him to muster a defense. Armijo set up a position in Apache Canyon, a narrow pass about 10 miles (16 km) southeast of the city. However, on August 14, before the American army was even in view, he decided not to fight. An American named James Magoffin claimed he had convinced Armijo and Archuleta to follow this course; an unverified story says he bribed Armijo. When Pino, Chaves, and some of the militiamen insisted on fighting, Armijo ordered the cannon pointed at them. The New Mexican army retreated to Santa Fe, and Armijo fled to Chihuahua.

Kearny and his troops encountered no Mexican forces when they arrived on August 15. Kearny and his force entered Santa Fe and claimed the New Mexico Territory for the United States without a shot fired. Kearny declared himself the military governor of the New Mexico Territory on August 18 and established a civilian government. American officers drew up a temporary legal system for the territory called the Kearny Code.

Kearny then took the remainder of his army west to Alta California; he left Colonel Sterling Price in command of U.S. forces in New Mexico. He appointed Charles Bent as New Mexico's first territorial governor. Following Kearny's departure, dissenters in Santa Fe plotted a Christmas uprising. When the plans were discovered by the U.S. authorities, the dissenters postponed the uprising. They attracted numerous Native allies, including Puebloans, who also wanted to push the Americans from the territory. On the morning of January 19, 1847, the insurrectionists began the revolt in Don Fernando de Taos, present-day Taos, New Mexico, which later gave it the name the Taos Revolt. They were led by Pablo Montoya, a New Mexican, and Tomás Romero, a Taos pueblo Native also known as Tomasito (Little Thomas).

Romero led a Native American force to Bent's house, where they broke down the door, shot Bent with arrows, and scalped him in front of his family. They moved on, leaving Bent still alive. With his wife Ignacia and children, and the wives of friends Kit Carson and Thomas Boggs, the group escaped by digging through the adobe walls of their house into the one next door. When the insurgents discovered the party, they killed Bent but left the women and children unharmed.

The next day, a large armed force of approximately 500 New Mexicans and Pueblo attacked and laid siege to Simeon Turley's mill in Arroyo Hondo, several miles outside of Taos. Charles Autobees, an employee at the mill, saw the men coming. He rode to Santa Fe for help from the occupying U.S. forces. Eight to ten mountain men were left at the mill for defense. After a day-long battle, only two of the mountain men survived, John David Albert and Thomas Tate Tobin, Autobees' half-brother. Both escaped separately on foot during the night. The same day, New Mexican insurgents killed seven American traders passing through the village of Mora. At most, 15 Americans were killed in both actions on January 20.

The U.S. military moved quickly to quash the revolt; Colonel Price led more than 300 U.S. troops from Santa Fe to Taos, together with 65 volunteers, including a few New Mexicans, organized by Ceran St. Vrain, the business partner of William and Charles Bent. Along the way, the combined forces beat back a force of some 1,500 New Mexicans and Pueblo at Santa Cruz de la Cañada and at Embudo Pass. The insurgents retreated to Taos Pueblo, where they took refuge in the thick-walled adobe church. During the ensuing battle, the U.S. breached a wall of the church and directed cannon fire into the interior, inflicting many casualties and killing about 150 rebels. They captured 400 more men after close hand-to-hand fighting. Only seven Americans died in the battle.

A separate force of U.S. troops under captains Israel R. Hendley and Jesse I. Morin campaigned against the rebels in Mora. The First Battle of Mora ended in a New Mexican victory. The Americans attacked again in the Second Battle of Mora and won, which ended their operations against Mora. New Mexican rebels engaged U.S. forces three more times in the following months. The actions are known as the Battle of Red River Canyon, the Battle of Las Vegas, and the Battle of Cienega Creek.

=== California campaign ===
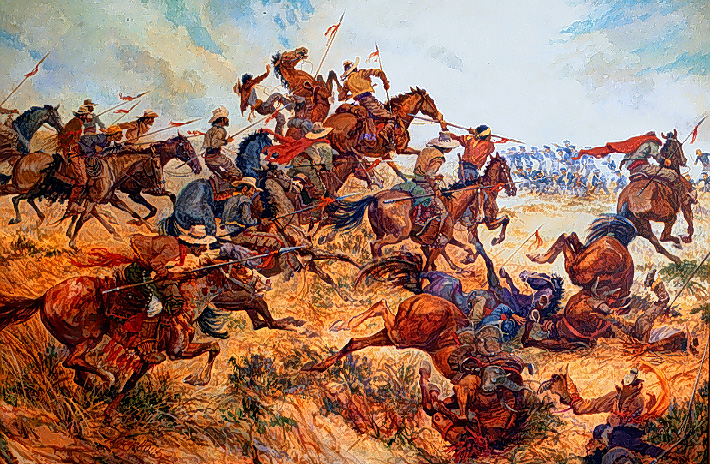
Battle of San Pasqual, a Californio victory led by General Andrés Pico against a superior American force led by General Stephen W. Kearny.

Word of Congress' declaration of war reached California by August 1846. American consul Thomas O. Larkin, stationed in Monterey, worked successfully during the events in that vicinity to avoid bloodshed between Americans and the Mexican military garrison commanded by General José Castro, the senior military officer in California.

Frémont, leading a U.S. Army topographical expedition to survey the Great Basin, entered Sacramento Valley in December 1845. Frémont's party was at Upper Klamath Lake in the Oregon Territory when it received word that war between Mexico and the U.S. was imminent; the party then returned to California.

Mexico had issued a proclamation that non-naturalized foreigners were no longer permitted to own land in California and were subject to expulsion. With rumors swirling that General Castro was massing an army against them, American settlers in the Sacramento Valley banded together to meet the threat. On June 14, 1846, 34 American settlers seized control of the undefended Mexican government outpost of Sonoma to forestall Castro's plans. One settler created the Bear Flag and raised it over Sonoma Plaza. Within a week, 70 more volunteers joined the rebels' force, which grew to nearly 300 in early July. This event, led by William B. Ide, became known as the Bear Flag Revolt.

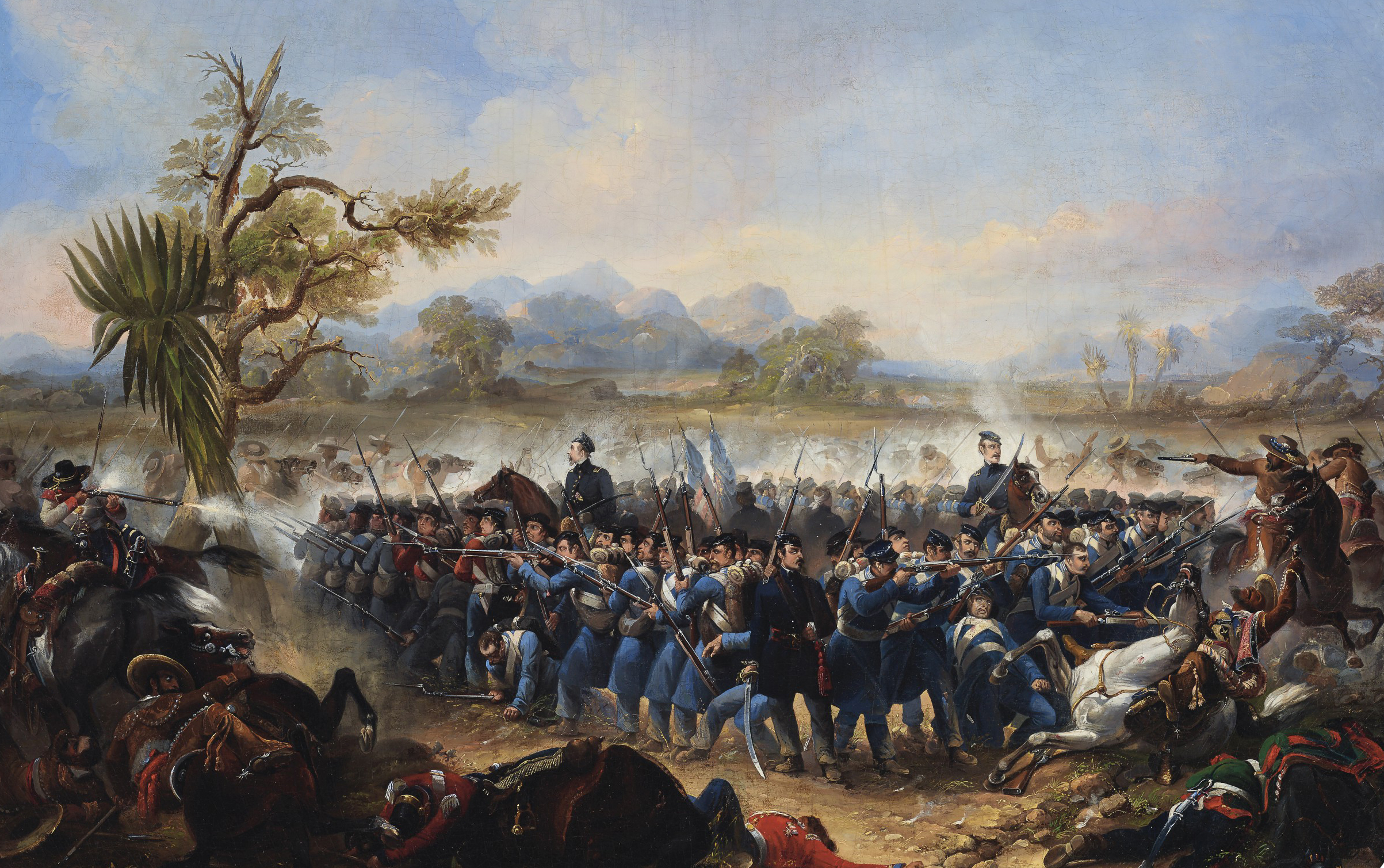
The Battle of Río San Gabriel was a decisive victory of American forces against the Californios during the U.S. conquest of California.

On June 25, Frémont's party arrived to assist in an expected military confrontation. San Francisco, then called Yerba Buena, was occupied by the Bear Flaggers on July 2. On July 5, Frémont's California Battalion was formed by combining his forces with many of the rebels.

Commodore John D. Sloat, commander of the U.S. Navy's Pacific Squadron, near Mazatlan, Mexico, had received orders to seize San Francisco Bay and blockade California ports when he was positive that war had begun. Sloat set sail for Monterey, reaching it on July 1. Sloat, upon hearing of the events in Sonoma and Frémont's involvement, erroneously believed Frémont to be acting on orders from Washington and ordered his forces to occupy Monterey on July 7 and raise the U.S. flag. On July 9, 70 sailors and Marines landed at Yerba Buena and raised the American flag. Later that day in Sonoma, the Bear Flag was lowered, and the American flag was raised in its place.

On Sloat's orders, Frémont brought 160 volunteers to Monterey, in addition to the California Battalion. On July 15, Sloat transferred his command of the Pacific Squadron to Commodore Robert F. Stockton, who was more militarily aggressive. He mustered the willing members of the California Battalion into military service with Frémont in command. Stockton ordered Frémont to San Diego to prepare to move northward to Los Angeles. As Frémont landed, Stockton's 360 men arrived in San Pedro. Castro and Pico wrote farewells and fled separately to the Mexican state of Sonora.

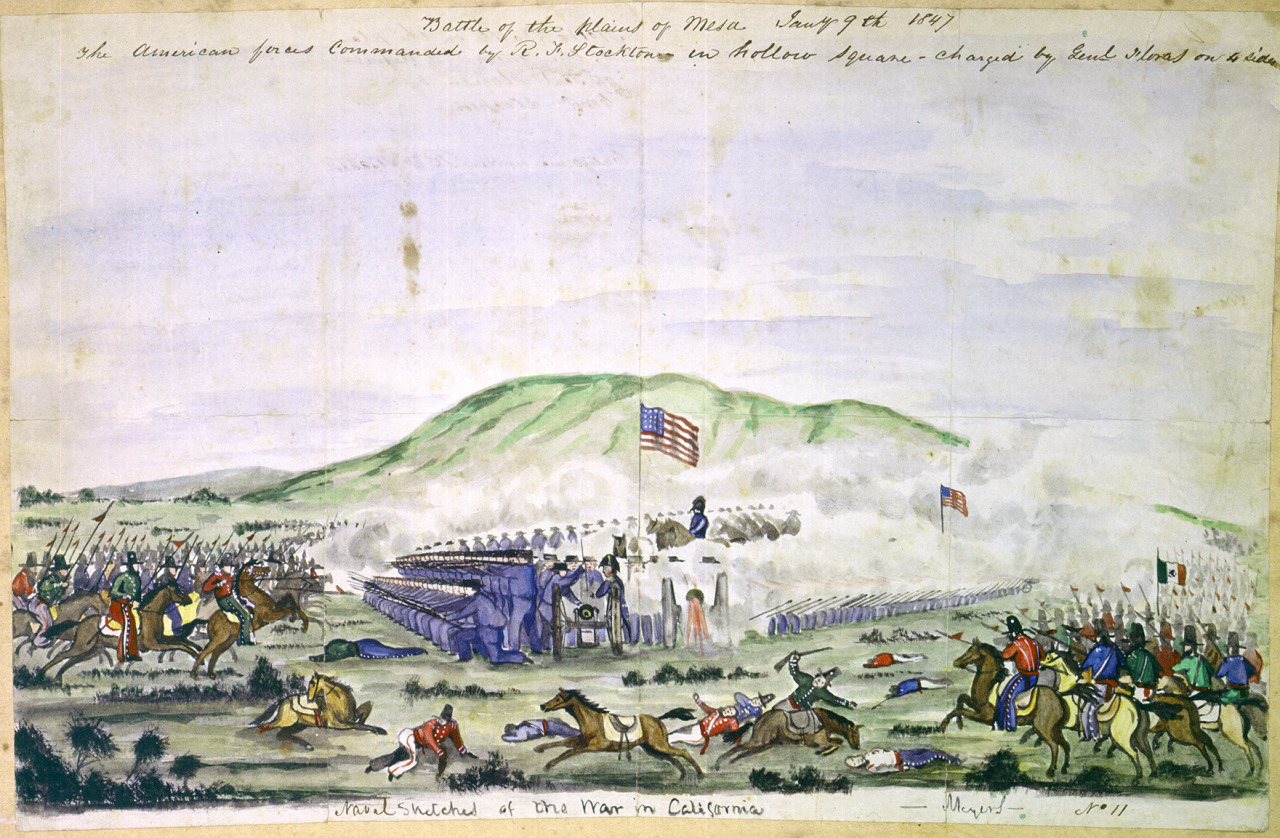
The Battle of La Mesa was the last battle fought between the Americans and Californio forces.

Stockton's army entered Los Angeles unopposed on August 13, whereupon he sent a report to the secretary of state that "California is entirely free from Mexican dominion." Stockton, however, left a tyrannical officer in charge of Los Angeles with a small force. The Californios under the leadership of José María Flores, acting on their own and without federal help from Mexico, in the Siege of Los Angeles, forced the American garrison to retreat on September 29. They also forced small U.S. garrisons in San Diego and Santa Barbara to flee.

Captain William Mervine landed 350 sailors and Marines at San Pedro on October 7. They were ambushed and repulsed at the Battle of Dominguez Rancho by Flores' forces in less than an hour. Four Americans died, with 8 severely injured. Stockton arrived with reinforcements at San Pedro, which increased the American forces there to 800. He and Mervine then set up a base of operations at San Diego.

Meanwhile, Kearny and his force of about 115 men, who had performed a grueling march across the Sonoran Desert, crossed the Colorado River in late November 1846. Stockton sent a 35-man patrol from San Diego to meet them. On December 7,100 lancers under General Andrés Pico (brother of the governor), tipped off and lying in wait, fought Kearny's army of about 150 at the Battle of San Pasqual, where 22 of Kearny's men (one of whom later died of wounds), including three officers, were killed in 30 minutes of fighting. The wounded Kearny and his bloodied force pushed on until they had to establish a defensive position on "Mule Hill." However, General Pico kept the hill under siege for four days until a 215-man American relief force arrived.

Frémont and the 428-man California Battalion arrived in San Luis Obispo on December 14 and Santa Barbara on December 27. On December 28, a 600-man American force under Kearny began a 150-mile march to Los Angeles. Flores then moved his ill-equipped 500-man force to a 50-foot-high bluff above the San Gabriel River. On January 8, 1847, the Stockton-Kearny army defeated the Californio force in the two-hour Battle of Río San Gabriel. That same day, Frémont's force arrived at San Fernando. The next day, January 9, the Stockton-Kearny forces fought and won the Battle of La Mesa. On January 10, the U.S. Army entered Los Angeles to no resistance.

On January 12, Frémont and two of Pico's officers agreed to terms for a surrender. Articles of Capitulation were signed on January 13 by Frémont, Andrés Pico and six others at a ranch at Cahuenga Pass (modern-day North Hollywood). This became known as the Treaty of Cahuenga, which marked the end of armed resistance in California.

=== Pacific Coast campaign ===
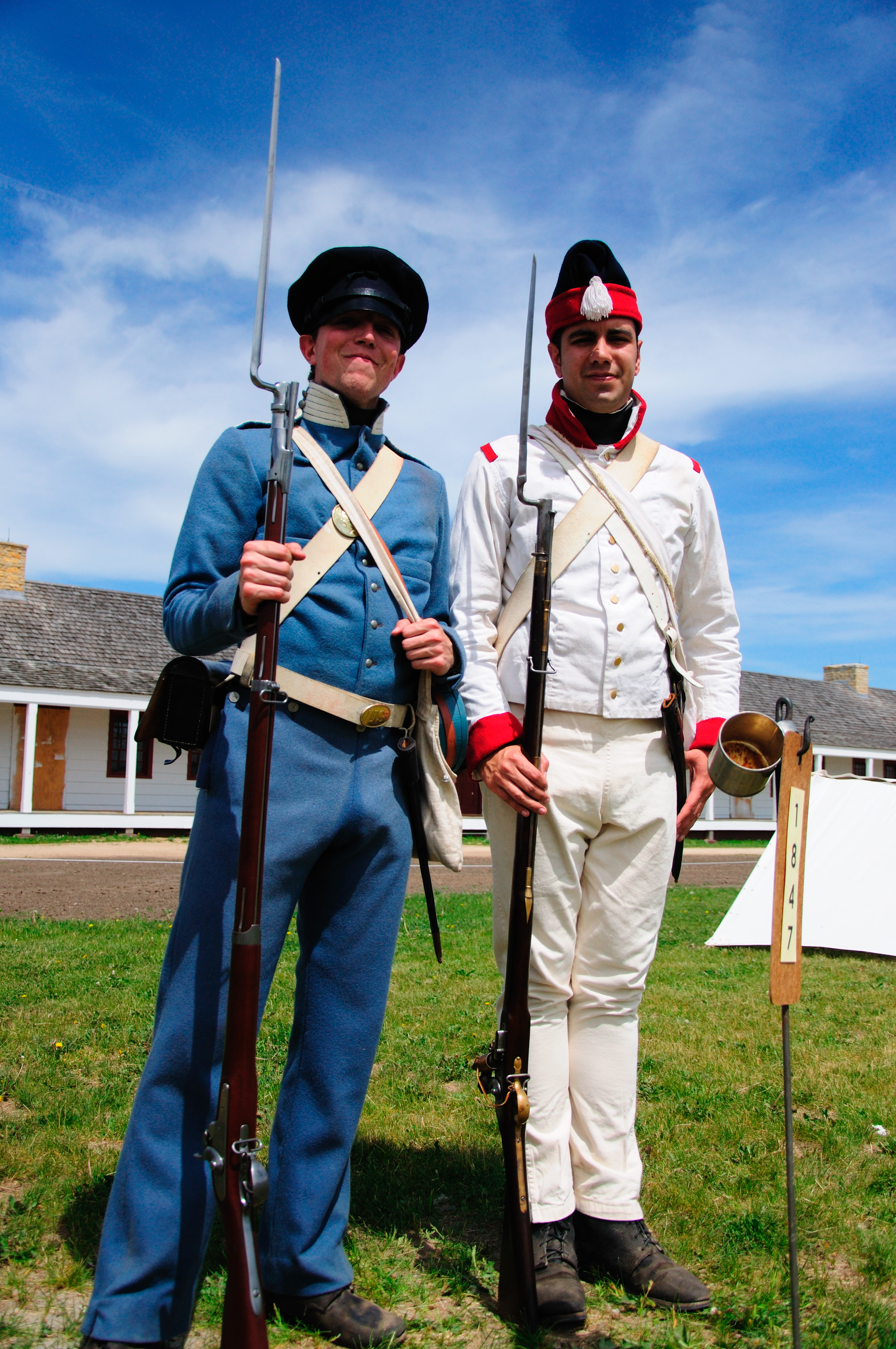
Reenactors in U.S. (left) and Mexican (right) uniforms of the period

Entering the Gulf of California, Independence, Congress, and Cyane seized La Paz, then captured and burned the small Mexican fleet at Guaymas on October 19, 1847. Within a month, they cleared the gulf of hostile ships, destroying or capturing 30 vessels. Later, their sailors and Marines captured the port of Mazatlán on November 11, 1847. After upper California was secure, most of the Pacific Squadron proceeded down the California coast, capturing all major cities of the Baja California Territory and capturing or destroying nearly all Mexican vessels in the Gulf of California.

A Mexican campaign under Manuel Pineda Muñoz to retake the various captured ports resulted in several small clashes and two sieges in which the Pacific Squadron ships provided artillery support. U.S. garrisons remained in control of the ports. Following reinforcement, Lt. Col. Henry S. Burton marched out. His forces rescued captured Americans, captured Pineda, and on March 31 defeated and dispersed remaining Mexican forces at the Skirmish of Todos Santos, unaware that the Treaty of Guadalupe Hidalgo had been signed in February 1848 and a truce agreed to on March 6. When the U.S. garrisons were evacuated to Monterey following the treaty ratification, many Mexicans went with them: those who had supported the U.S. cause and had thought Lower California would also be annexed along with Upper California.

=== Northeastern Mexico ===
==== Battle of Monterrey ====
Led by Zachary Taylor, 2,300 U.S. troops crossed the Rio Grande after some initial difficulties in obtaining river transport. His soldiers occupied Matamoros, then Camargo (where the soldiery suffered the first of many problems with disease) and then proceeded south and besieged the city of Monterrey, Nuevo León. The hard-fought Battle of Monterrey resulted in serious losses on both sides. The U.S. light artillery was ineffective against the stone fortifications of the city, as the American forces attacked in frontal assaults. The Mexican forces under General Pedro de Ampudia repulsed Taylor's best infantry division at Fort Teneria.

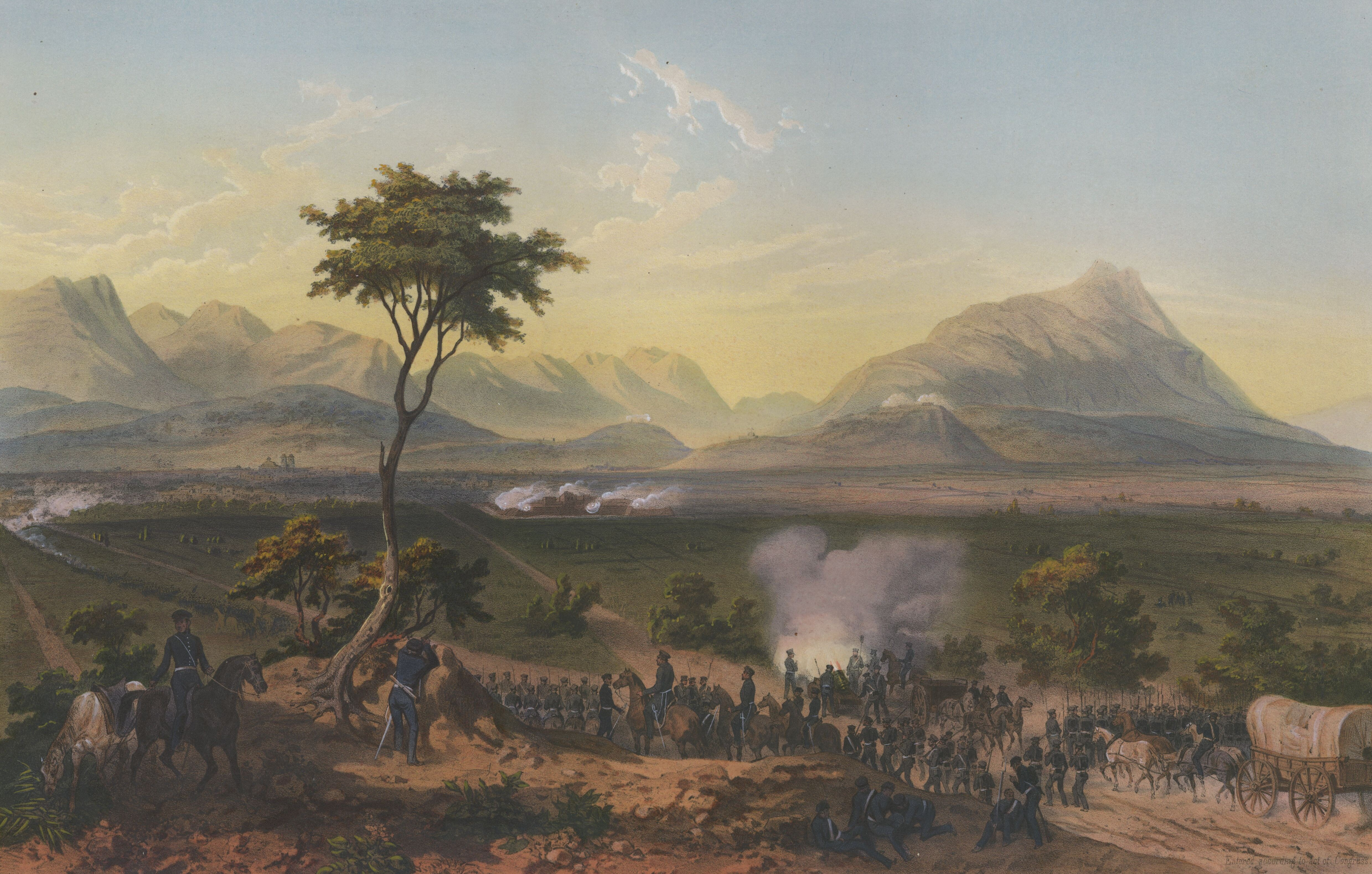
The Battle of Monterrey September 20–24, 1846, after a painting by Carl Nebel

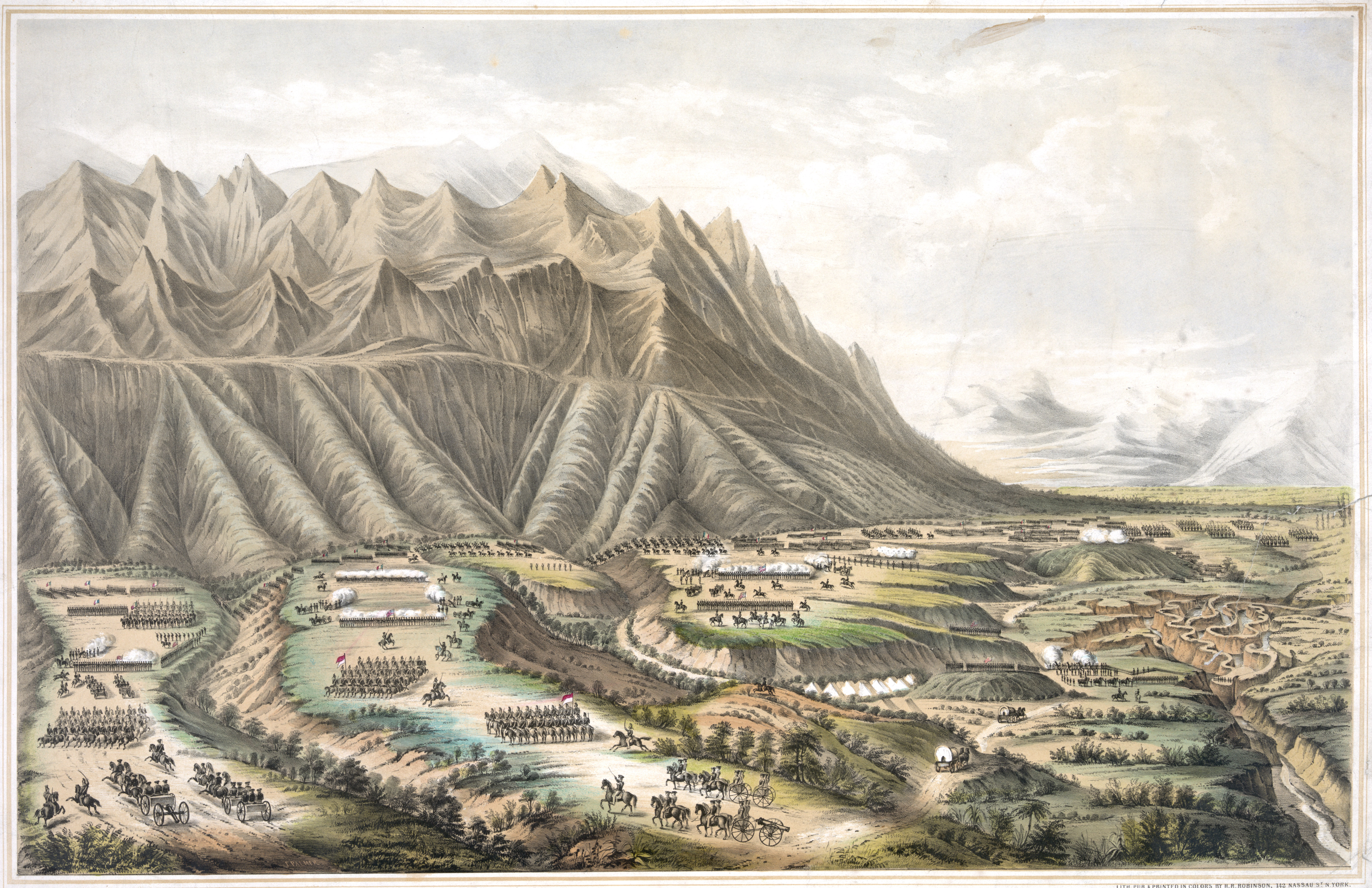
Battle of Buena Vista

American soldiers, including many West Point graduates, had never engaged in urban warfare before, and they marched straight down the open streets, where they were annihilated by Mexican defenders well-hidden in Monterrey's thick adobe homes. They quickly learned, and two days later, they changed their urban warfare tactics. Texan soldiers had fought in a Mexican city before (the Siege of Béxar in December 1835) and advised Taylor's generals that the Americans needed to "mouse hole" through the city's homes. They needed to punch holes in the side or roofs of the homes and fight hand to hand inside the structures. Mexicans called the Texas soldiers the Diabólicos Tejanos (the Devil Texans). This method proved successful. Eventually, these actions drove and trapped Ampudia's men into the city's central plaza, where howitzer shelling forced Ampudia to negotiate. Taylor agreed to allow the Mexican Army to evacuate and to an eight-week armistice in return for the surrender of the city. Taylor broke the armistice and occupied the city of Saltillo, southwest of Monterrey. Santa Anna blamed the loss of Monterrey and Saltillo on Ampudia and demoted him to command a small artillery battalion. Similarly, Polk blamed Taylor both for suffering heavy losses and failing to imprison Ampudia's entire force. Taylor's army was subsequently stripped of most of its troops in order to support the coming coastal operations by Scott against Veracruz and the Mexican heartland.

==== Battle of Buena Vista ====
On February 22, 1847, having heard of this weakness from the written orders found on an ambushed U.S. scout, Santa Anna seized the initiative and marched Mexico's entire army north to fight Taylor with 20,000 men, hoping to win a smashing victory before Scott could invade from the sea. The two armies met and fought the largest battle of the war at the Battle of Buena Vista. Taylor, with 4,600 men, had entrenched at a mountain pass called La Angostura, or "the narrows," several miles south of Buena Vista ranch. Santa Anna, having little logistics to supply his army, suffered desertions all the long march north and arrived with only 15,000 men in a tired state.

Having demanded and been refused the surrender of the U.S. Army, Santa Anna's army attacked the next morning, using a ruse in the battle with the U.S. forces. Santa Anna flanked the U.S. positions by sending his cavalry and some of his infantry up the steep terrain that made up one side of the pass, while a division of infantry attacked frontally to distract and draw out the U.S. forces along the road leading to Buena Vista. Furious fighting ensued, during which the U.S. troops were nearly routed, but managed to cling to their entrenched position, thanks to the Mississippi Rifles, a volunteer regiment led by Jefferson Davis, who formed them into a defensive V formation. The Mexicans had nearly broken the American lines at several points, but their infantry columns, navigating the narrow pass, suffered heavily from the American horse artillery, which fired point-blank canister shots to break up the attacks.

Initial reports of the battle, as well as propaganda from the Santanistas, credited the victory to the Mexicans, much to the joy of the Mexican populace, but rather than attack the next day and finish the battle, Santa Anna retreated, losing men along the way, having heard word of rebellion and upheaval in Mexico City. Taylor was left in control of part of northern Mexico, and Santa Anna later faced criticism for his withdrawal. Mexican and American military historians alike agree that the U.S. Army could likely have been defeated if Santa Anna had fought the battle to its finish.

Polk mistrusted Taylor, who he felt had shown incompetence in the Battle of Monterrey by agreeing to the armistice. Taylor later used the Battle of Buena Vista as the centerpiece of his successful 1848 presidential campaign.

=== Northwestern Mexico ===
Northwestern Mexico was essentially tribal Native territory, but on November 21, 1846, the Bear Springs Treaty was signed, ending a large-scale insurrection by the Ute, Zuni, Moquis, and Navajo tribes. In December 1846, after the successful conquest of New Mexico, part of Kearney's Army of the West, the First Missouri Mounted Volunteers, moved into modern-day northwest Mexico. They were led by Alexander W. Doniphan, continuing what ended up being a year-long 5,500 mile campaign. It was described as rivaling Xenophon's march across Anatolia during the Greco-Persian Wars.

On Christmas day, they won the Battle of El Brazito, outside the modern-day El Paso, Texas. On March 1, 1847, Doniphan occupied Chihuahua City. British consul John Potts did not want to allow Doniphan to search Governor Trías's mansion and unsuccessfully asserted it was under British protection. American merchants in Chihuahua wanted the American force to stay in order to protect their business. Major William Gilpin advocated a march on Mexico City and convinced a majority of officers, but Doniphan subverted this plan. Then in late April, Taylor ordered the First Missouri Mounted Volunteers to leave Chihuahua and join him at Saltillo. The American merchants either followed or returned to Santa Fe. Along the way, the townspeople of Parras enlisted Doniphan's aid against a Native raiding party that had taken children, horses, mules, and money. The Missouri Volunteers finally made their way to Matamoros, from which they returned to Missouri by water.

The civilian population of northern Mexico offered little resistance to the American invasion, possibly because the country had already been devastated by Comanche and Apache Native raids. Josiah Gregg, who was with the American army in northern Mexico, said "the whole country from New Mexico to the borders of Durango is almost entirely depopulated. The haciendas and ranchos have been mostly abandoned, and the people chiefly confined to the towns and cities."

=== Southern Mexico ===
Southern Mexico had a large indigenous population and was geographically distant from the capital, over which the central government had weak control. Yucatán in particular had closer ties to Cuba and to the United States than it did to central Mexico. On a number of occasions in the early era of the Mexican Republic, Yucatán seceded from the federation. There were also rivalries between regional elites, with one faction based in Mérida and the other in Campeche. These issues factored into the Mexican–American War, as the U. S. had designs on this part of the coast.

The U.S. Navy contributed to the war by controlling the coast and clearing the way for U.S. troops and supplies, especially to Mexico's main port of Veracruz. Even before hostilities began in the disputed northern region, the U.S. Navy created a blockade. Given the shallow waters of that portion of the coast, the U.S. Navy needed ships with a shallow draft rather than large frigates. Since the Mexican Navy was almost non-existent, the U.S. Navy could operate unimpeded in gulf waters. The U.S. fought two battles in Tabasco in October 1846 and in June 1847.

In 1847, the Maya revolted against the Mexican elites of the peninsula in a caste war known as the Caste War of Yucatán. Jefferson Davis, then a senator from Mississippi, argued in Congress that the president needed no further powers to intervene in Yucatan since the war with Mexico was underway. Davis's concern was strategic and part of his vision of Manifest Destiny, considering that the Gulf of Mexico "a basin of water belonging to the United States" and that "the cape of Yucatan and the island of Cuba must be ours." These views were later supported by the Knights of the Golden Circle, of which Davis was allegedly a member. In the end, the U.S. did not intervene in Yucatán, but it had figured in congressional debates about the Mexican–American War. At one point, the government of Yucatán petitioned the U.S. for protection during the Caste War, but the U.S. did not respond.

== Scott's invasion of Mexico's heartland ==
=== Landings and siege of Veracruz ===
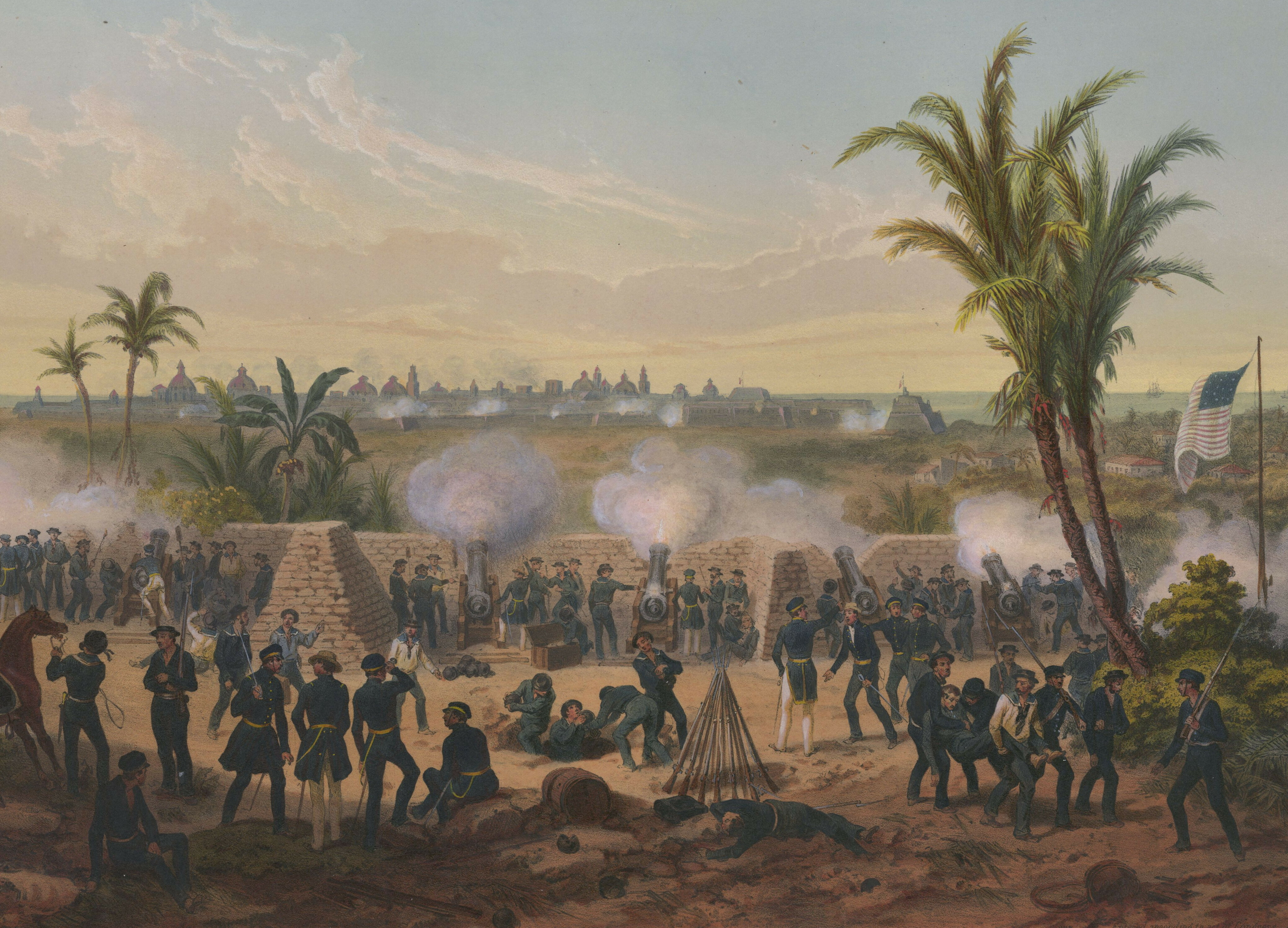
The bombardment of Veracruz

Rather than reinforce Taylor's army for a continued advance, President Polk sent a second army under General Winfield Scott. Polk had decided that the way to bring the war to an end was to invade the Mexican heartland from the coast. General Scott's army was transported to the port of Veracruz by sea to begin an invasion to take the Mexican capital, Mexico City. On March 9, 1847, Scott performed the first major amphibious landing in U.S. history in preparation for a siege. A group of 12,000 volunteer and regular soldiers successfully offloaded supplies, weapons, and horses near the walled city using specially designed landing crafts. Included in the invading force were several future generals: Robert E. Lee, George Meade, Ulysses S. Grant, James Longstreet, and Thomas "Stonewall" Jackson.

Veracruz was defended by Mexican General Juan Morales with 3,400 men. Mortars and naval guns under Commodore Matthew C. Perry were used to reduce the city walls and harass defenders. The bombardment on March 24, 1847, opened in the walls of Veracruz a thirty-foot gap. The defenders in the city replied with their own artillery, but the extended barrage broke the will of the Mexicans, who faced a numerically superior force, and they surrendered the city after 12 days under siege. U.S. troops suffered 80 casualties, while the Mexicans had around 180 killed and wounded, with hundreds of civilians killed. During the siege, the U.S. soldiers began to fall victim to yellow fever.

=== Advance on Puebla ===
Scott's campaign

Santa Anna allowed Scott's army to march inland, counting on yellow fever and other tropical diseases to take their toll before Santa Anna chose a place to engage the enemy. Mexico had used this tactic before, including when Spain attempted to reconquer Mexico in 1829. Disease could be a decisive factor in the war. Santa Anna was from Veracruz, so he was on his home territory, knew the terrain, and had a network of allies. He could draw on local resources to feed his hungry army and gain intelligence on the enemy's movements. From his experience in the northern battles on open terrain, Santa Anna sought to negate the U.S. Army's primary advantage, its use of artillery.

Santa Anna chose Cerro Gordo as the place to engage the U.S. troops, calculating the terrain would offer the maximum advantage for the Mexican forces. Scott marched westward on April 2, 1847, toward Mexico City with 8,500 initially healthy troops, while Santa Anna set up a defensive position in a canyon around the main road and prepared fortifications. Santa Anna had entrenched with what the U.S. Army believed were 12,000 troops but in fact was around 9,000. He had artillery trained on the road where he expected Scott to appear. However, Scott had sent 2,600 mounted dragoons ahead, and they reached the pass on April 12. The Mexican artillery prematurely fired on them and therefore revealed their positions, beginning the skirmish.

Instead of taking the main road, Scott's troops trekked through the rough terrain to the north, setting up his artillery on the high ground and quietly flanking the Mexicans. Although by then aware of the positions of U.S. troops, Santa Anna and his troops were unprepared for the onslaught that followed. In the battle fought on April 18, the Mexican army was routed. The U.S. Army suffered 400 casualties, while the Mexicans suffered over 1,000 casualties with 3,000 taken prisoner. In August 1847, Captain Kirby Smith, of Scott's 3rd Infantry, reflected on the resistance of the Mexican army:

They can do nothing and their continued defeats should convince them of it. They have lost six great battles; we have captured six hundred and eight cannon, nearly one hundred thousand stands of arms, made twenty thousand prisoners, have the greatest portion of their country and are fast advancing on their Capital which must be ours,—yet they refuse to treat [i.e., negotiate terms]!

The U.S. Army had expected a quick collapse of the Mexican forces. Santa Anna, however, was determined to fight to the end, and Mexican soldiers continued to regroup after battles to fight yet again.

=== Pause at Puebla ===
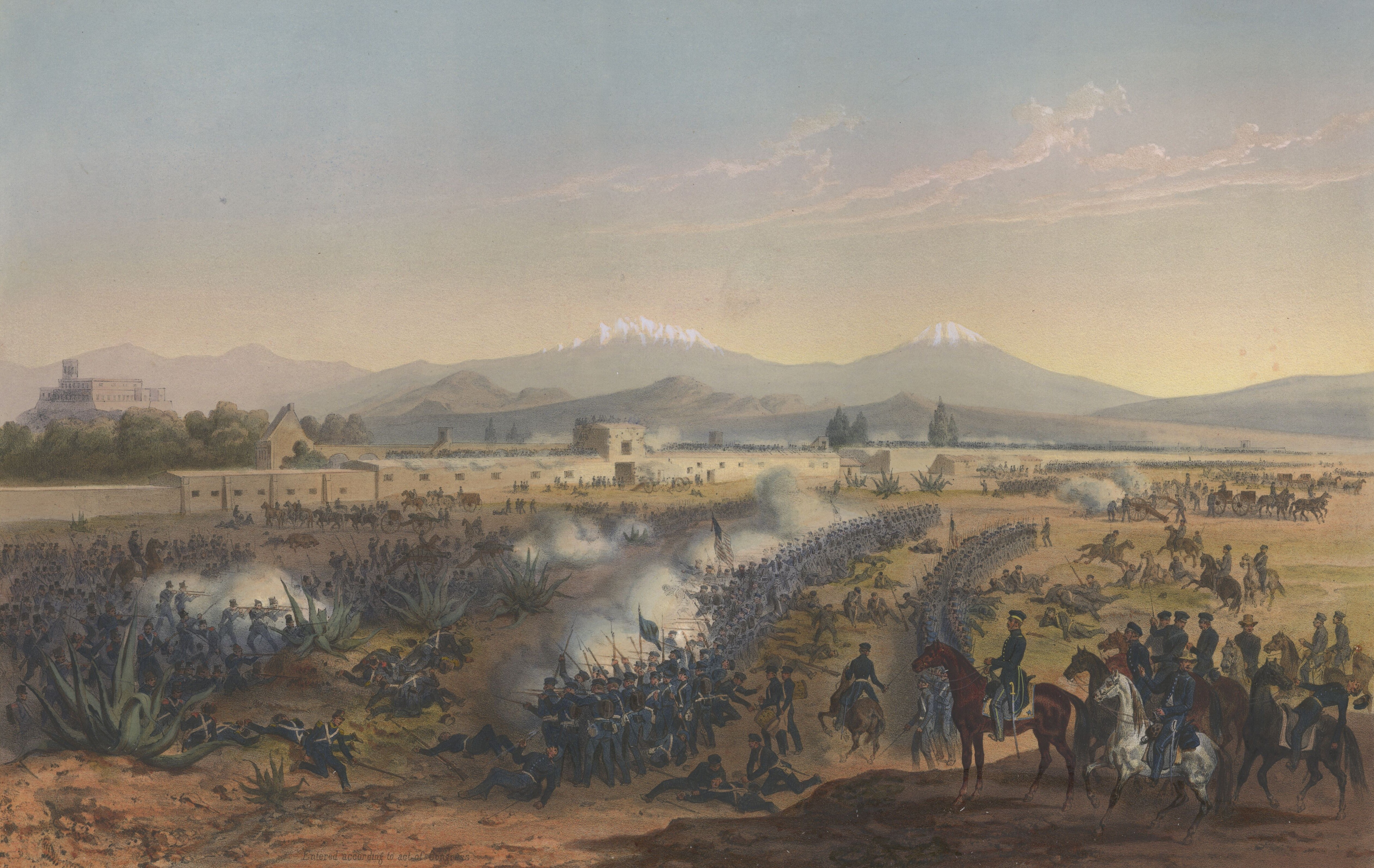
The Battle of Molino del Rey

On May 1, 1847, Scott pushed on to Puebla, the second-largest city in Mexico. The city capitulated without resistance. The Mexican defeat at Cerro Gordo had demoralized Puebla's inhabitants, and they worried about harm to their city and inhabitants. It was standard practice in warfare for victorious soldiers to be let loose to inflict horrors on civilian populations if they resisted; the threat of this was often used as a bargaining tool to secure surrender without a fight. Scott had orders which aimed to prevent his troops from such violence and atrocities. Puebla's ruling elite also sought to prevent violence, as did the Catholic Church, but Puebla's poor and working-class wanted to defend the city. U.S. Army troops who strayed outside at night were often killed. Enough Mexicans were willing to sell supplies to the U.S. Army to make local provisioning possible. During the following months, Scott gathered supplies and reinforcements at Puebla and sent back units whose enlistments had expired. Scott also made strong efforts to keep his troops disciplined and treat the Mexican people under occupation justly, to keep good order and prevent any popular uprising against his army.

=== Advance on Mexico City and its capture ===
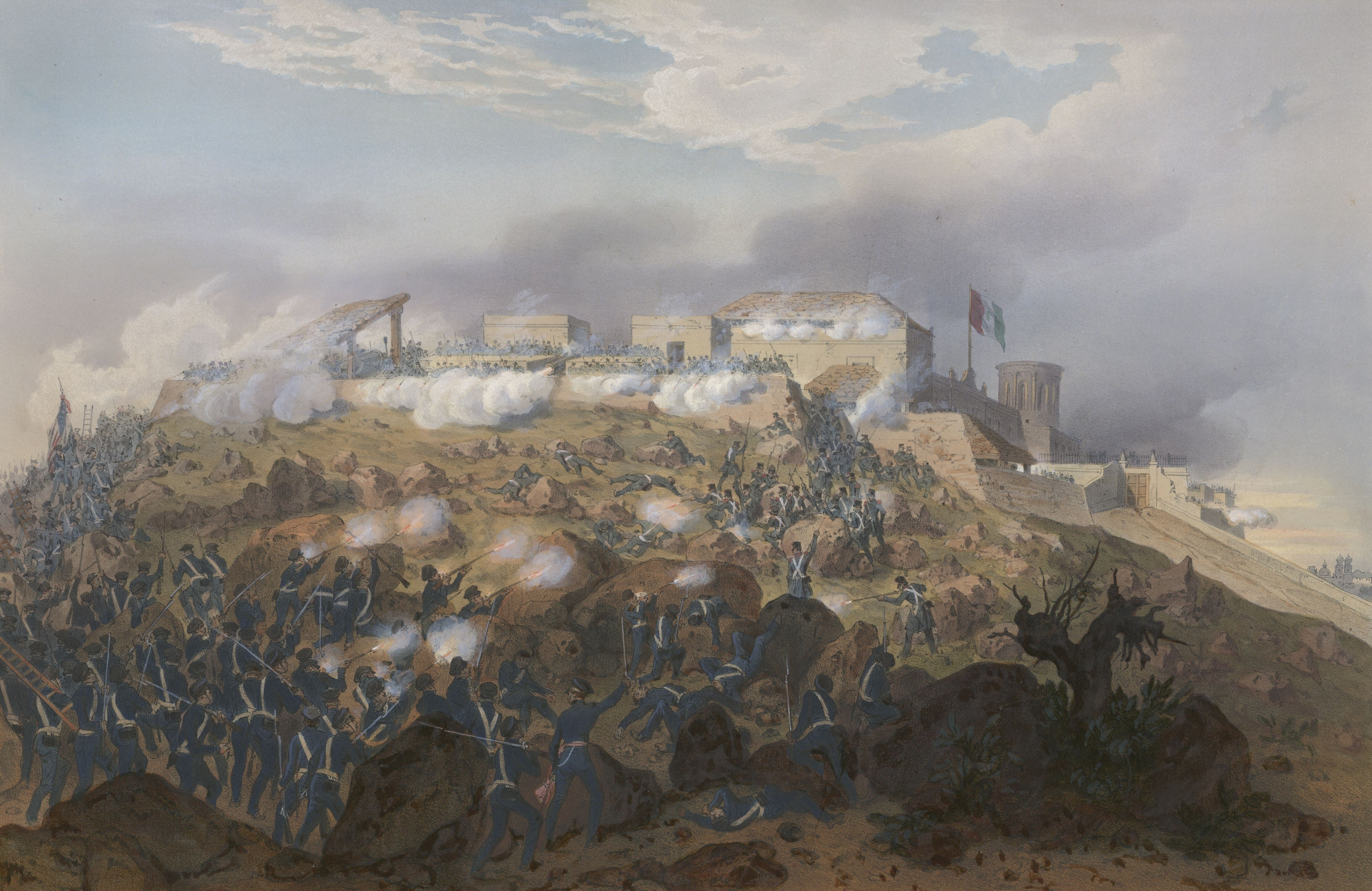
The Battle of Chapultepec

With guerrillas harassing his line of communications back to Veracruz, Scott decided not to weaken his army to defend Puebla but, leaving only a garrison at Puebla to protect the sick and injured recovering there, advanced on Mexico City on August 7 with his remaining force. The capital was laid open in a series of battles around the right flank of the city defenses, the Battle of Contreras and Battle of Churubusco. After Churubusco, fighting halted for an armistice and peace negotiations, which broke down on September 6, 1847. With the subsequent battles of Molino del Rey and of Chapultepec, and the storming of the city gates, the capital was occupied. Scott became military governor of occupied Mexico City. His victories in this campaign made him an American national hero.

The Battle of Chapultepec in September 1847 was a siege on the castle of Chapultepec, built on a hill in Mexico City in the colonial era. At this time, this castle was a renowned military school in the capital. After the battle, which ended in a victory for the U.S., the legend of Los Niños Héroes was born. Although not confirmed by historians, six military cadets between the ages of 13 and 17 stayed in the school instead of evacuating. They decided to stay and fight for Mexico. These Niños Héroes (boy heroes) became icons in Mexico's patriotic pantheon. Rather than surrender to the U.S. Army, some military cadets leaped from the castle walls. A cadet named Juan Escutia wrapped himself in the Mexican flag and jumped to his death.

=== Santa Anna's last campaign ===
In late September 1847, Santa Anna made one last attempt to defeat the U.S. Army, by cutting them off from the coast. General Joaquín Rea began the Siege of Puebla, soon joined by Santa Anna. Scott had left some 2,400 soldiers in Puebla, of whom around 400 were fit. After the fall of Mexico City, Santa Anna hoped to rally Puebla's civilian population against the U.S. soldiers under siege and subject to guerrilla attacks. Before the Mexican army could wipe out the Americans in Puebla, more troops landed in Veracruz under the command of Brigadier General Joseph Lane. At Puebla, they sacked the town. Santa Anna was not able to provision his troops, who effectively dissolved as a fighting force to forage for food. Puebla was relieved by Lane on October 12, following his defeat of Santa Anna at the Battle of Huamantla on October 9. The battle was Santa Anna's last.

=== Occupation of Mexico City ===
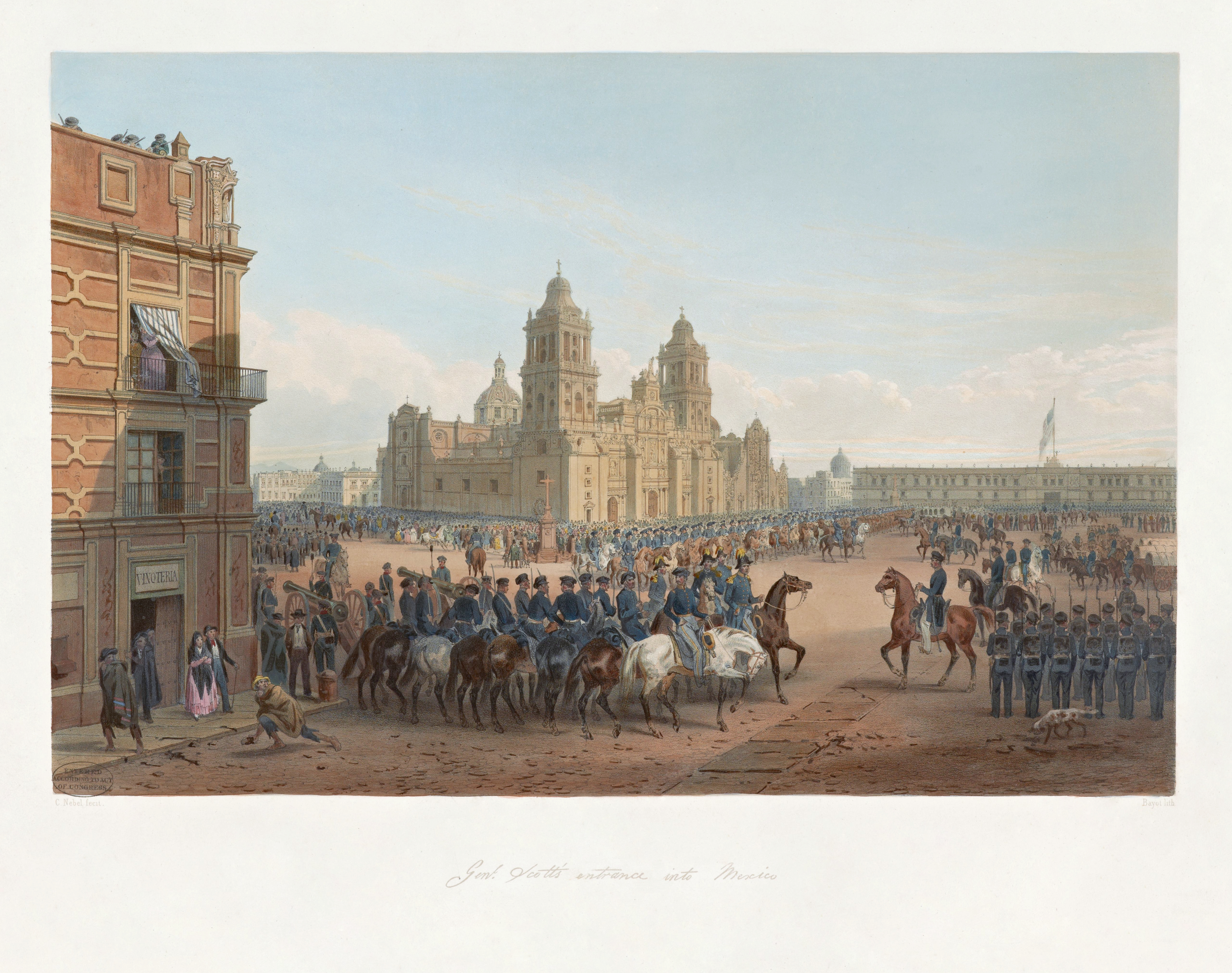
U.S. Army occupation of Mexico City in 1847. The U.S. flag flying over the National Palace, the seat of the Mexican government. Carl Nebel.

Following the capture of the capital, the Mexican government moved to the temporary capital at Querétaro. In Mexico City, U.S. forces became an army of occupation and subject to stealth attacks from the urban population. Conventional warfare gave way to guerrilla warfare by Mexicans defending their homeland. They inflicted significant casualties on the U.S. Army, particularly on soldiers slow to keep up.

General Scott sent about a quarter of his strength to secure his line of communications to Veracruz from the Light Corps of General Rea and other Mexican guerrilla forces that had made stealth attacks since May. Mexican guerrillas often tortured and mutilated the bodies of the U.S. troops, as revenge and warning.

Scott viewed guerrilla attacks as contrary to the "laws of war" and threatened the property of populations that appeared to harbor the guerrillas. Captured guerrillas were to be shot, including helpless prisoners, with the reasoning that the Mexicans did the same. Historian Peter Guardino contends that the U.S. Army command was complicit in the attacks against Mexican civilians. By threatening the civilian populations' homes, property, and families with burning whole villages, looting, and raping women, the U.S. Army separated guerrillas from their base. "Guerrillas cost the Americans dearly, but indirectly cost Mexican civilians more."

Scott strengthened the garrison of Puebla and by November had added a 1,200-man garrison at Jalapa, established 750-man posts along the main route between the port of Veracruz and the capital, at the pass between Mexico City and Puebla at Rio Frio, at Perote and San Juan on the road between Jalapa and Puebla, and at Puente Nacional between Jalapa and Veracruz. He had also detailed an anti-guerrilla brigade under Lane to carry the war to the Light Corps and other guerrillas. He ordered that convoys would travel with at least 1,300-man escorts. Victories by Lane over the Light Corps at Atlixco (October 18, 1847), at Izúcar de Matamoros (November 23, 1847), and at Galaxara Pass (November 24, 1847) weakened General Rea's forces.

Later a raid against the guerrillas of Padre Jarauta at Zacualtipan (February 25, 1848) further reduced guerrilla raids on the American line of communications. After the two governments concluded a truce to await ratification of the peace treaty, on March 6, 1848, formal hostilities ceased. However, some bands continued in defiance of the Mexican government until the U.S. Army's evacuation in August. Some were suppressed by the Mexican Army or, like Padre Jarauta, executed.

=== Desertions ===
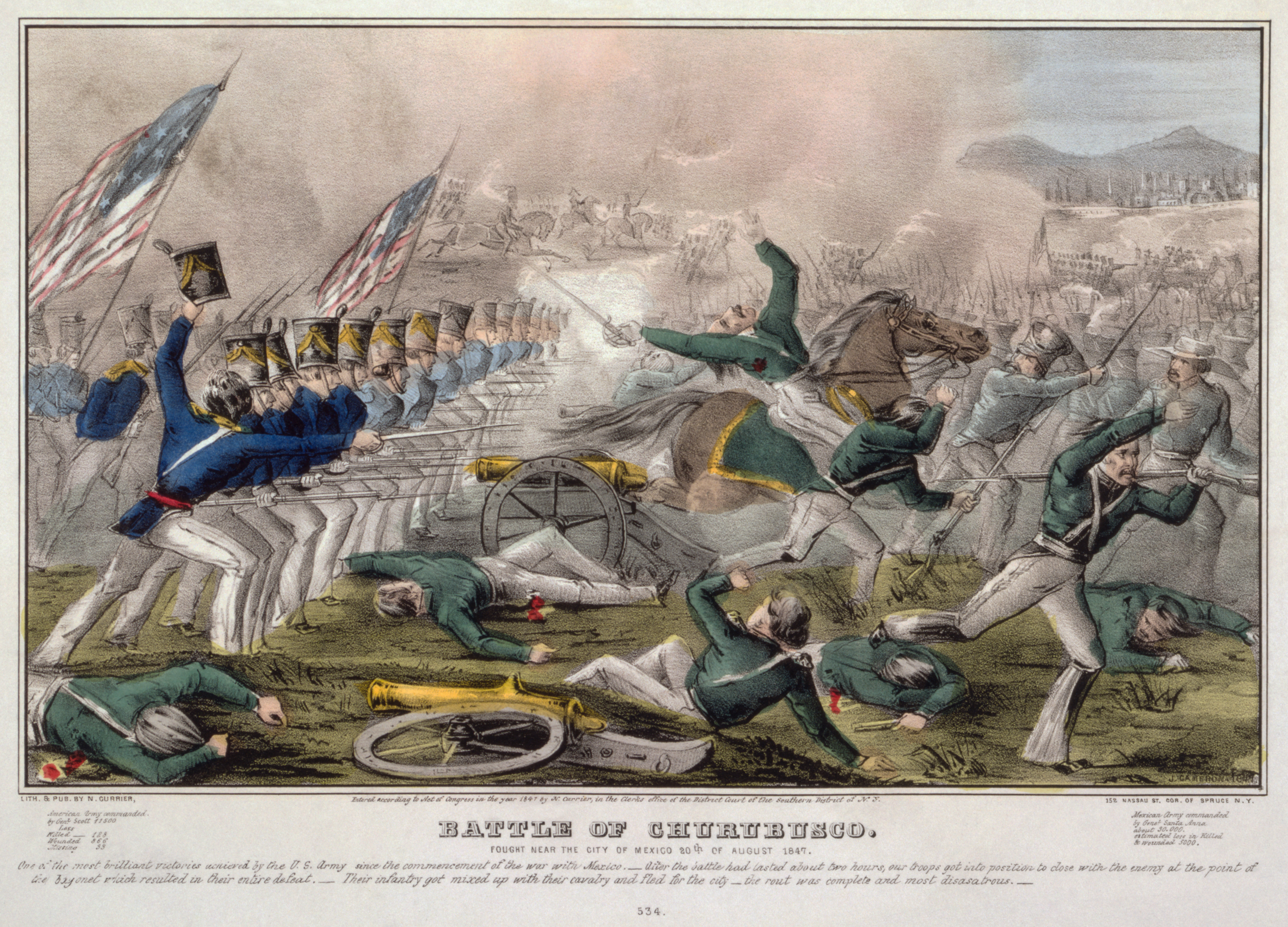
Battle of Churubusco by J. Cameron, published by Nathaniel Currier. Hand tinted lithograph, 1847. Digitally restored.

Desertion was a major problem for both armies. In the Mexican Army, desertions depleted forces on the eve of battle. Most soldiers were peasants who had a loyalty to their village and family but not to the generals who had conscripted them. Often hungry and ill, underequipped, only partially trained, and under-paid, the soldiers were held in contempt by their officers and had little reason to fight the Americans. Looking for their opportunity, many slipped away from camp to find their way back to their home village.

The desertion rate in the U.S. Army was 8.3% (9,200 out of 111,000), compared to 12.7% during the War of 1812 and usual peacetime rates of about 14.8% per year. Many men deserted to join another U.S. unit and get a second enlistment bonus. Some deserted because of the miserable conditions in camp. It has been suggested that others used the army to get free transportation to California, where they deserted to join the gold rush; this, however, is unlikely as gold was only discovered in California on January 24, 1848, less than two weeks before the war concluded. By the time word reached the eastern U.S. that gold had been discovered, word also reached it that the war was over.

Hundreds of U.S. deserters went over to the Mexican side. Nearly all were recent immigrants from Europe with weak ties to the U.S. The Mexicans issued broadsides and leaflets enticing U.S. soldiers with promises of money, land bounties, and officers' commissions. Mexican guerrillas shadowed the U.S. Army and captured men who took unauthorized leave or fell out of the ranks. The guerrillas sometimes coerced these men to join the Mexican ranks.

Thousands of other U.S. soldiers simply deserted.

==== San Patricios ====
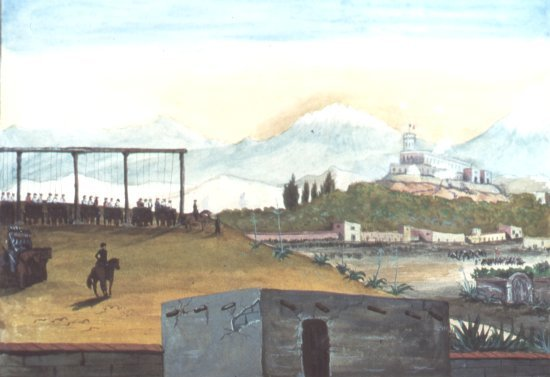
The mass hanging of Irish Catholic soldiers who joined the Mexican side, forming the Saint Patrick's Battalion

The most famous group of deserters from the U.S. Army was the Saint Patrick's Battalion or San Patricios, composed primarily of several hundred immigrant soldiers, the majority Catholic Irish and German immigrants, who deserted the U.S. Army because of reasons such as discrimination from their superiors, resentment of harsh living conditions during the war as well as feeling allegiance to Mexico, which is a predominantly Roman-Catholic nation. The battalion included Canadians, English, French, Italians, Poles, Scots, Spaniards, Swiss, and Mexican people, many of whom were members of the Catholic Church.

Most of the battalion were killed in the Battle of Churubusco; about 100 were captured by the U.S., and roughly half of the San Patricios were tried and were hanged as deserters following their capture at Churubusco in August 1847. The leader, John Riley, was branded. A bust of John Riley and a plaque on the façade of a building in Plaza San Jacinto, San Angel commemorates the place where they were hanged.

== End of war, terms of peace ==
Outnumbered militarily and with many large cities of the Mexican heartland including its capital occupied, Mexico could not defend itself in conventional warfare. Mexico faced many continuing internal divisions between factions so that bringing the war to a formal end was not straightforward. Although there were complications with negotiating peace on both ends, peace came in Alta California in January 1847 with the Treaty of Cahuenga, with the Californios (Mexican residents of Alta California) capitulating to the American forces. A more comprehensive peace treaty was needed to end the conflict.

The U.S. forces had gone from being an army of conquest on the periphery for territory it desired to incorporate, to an invading force in central Mexico, potentially making it an army of long-term occupation. Mexico did not necessarily have to sign a peace treaty but could have continued with long-term guerrilla warfare against the U.S. Army. However, it could not expel the invaders, so negotiating a treaty became more necessary. Polk's wish for a short war of conquest against a perceived weak enemy with no will to fight had turned into a long and bloody conflict in Mexico's heartland. Negotiating a treaty was in the best interest of the United States. It was not easy to achieve. Polk lost confidence in his negotiator Nicholas Trist and dismissed him as peace negotiations dragged on. Trist ignored the fact that he no longer had the authorization to act for the United States. When Trist managed to get yet another Mexican government to sign the Treaty of Guadalupe Hidalgo, Polk was presented with an accomplished fact and decided to take it to Congress for ratification. Ratification was a daunting task, since the Democrats had lost the elections of 1846, and Whigs opposed to the war were now in ascendance.

=== All-Mexico Movement ===
Having won a decisive victory, the U.S. was divided on what the peace should entail. Now that the U.S. had gone far beyond the territorial gains it initially envisioned by invading central Mexico with its dense population, the question was raised whether to annex the entirety of Mexico. After the Wilmot Proviso, there was a lessening of fervor for the idea, but the taking of Mexico City had revived enthusiasm. There were fierce objections in Congress to that on racial grounds. South Carolina Senator John C. Calhoun argued that absorbing Mexico would threaten U.S. institutions and the character of the country. "We have never dreamt of incorporating into our Union any but the Caucasian race—the free white race. To incorporate Mexico, would be the first instance of the kind of incorporating an Indian race; for more than half of the Mexicans are Indians, and the other is composed chiefly of mixed tribes. I protest against such a union as that! Ours, sir, is the Government of a white race.... We are anxious to force free government on all; and I see that it has been urged ... that it is the mission of this country to spread civil and religious liberty over all the world, and especially over this continent. It is a great mistake."

Beyond the racial argument, Calhoun contended that the U.S. could not be both an empire and a republic, and he argued that being an empire would strengthen the central government and be detrimental to individual states. Rhode Island Whig Senator John Clarke also objected to annexing all of Mexico. "To incorporate such a disjointed and degraded mass into even a limited participation with our social and political rights, would be fatally destructive to the institutions of our country. There is a moral pestilence to such a people which is contagious – a leprosy that will destroy [us]."

=== Treaty of Guadalupe Hidalgo ===
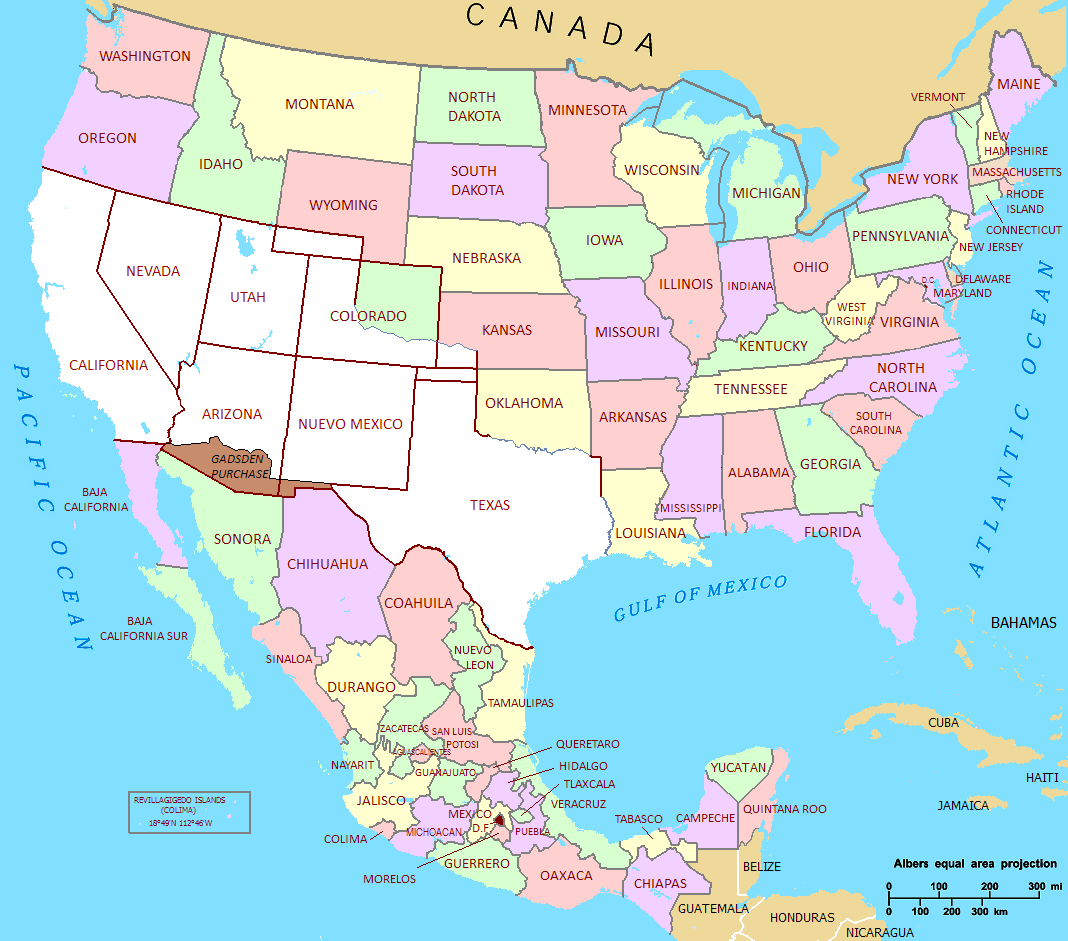
Mexican territorial claims relinquished in the Treaty of Guadalupe Hidalgo in white

The Treaty of Guadalupe Hidalgo, signed on February 2, 1848, by diplomat Nicholas Trist and Mexican plenipotentiary representatives Luis G. Cuevas, Bernardo Couto, and Miguel Atristain, ended the war. The treaty gave the U.S. undisputed control of Texas, established the U.S.–Mexican border along the Rio Grande, and ceded to the United States the present-day states of California, Nevada, and Utah, most of New Mexico, Arizona and Colorado, and parts of Texas, Oklahoma, Kansas, and Wyoming. In return, Mexico received $15 million ($558 million today) – less than half the amount the U.S. had attempted to offer Mexico for the land before the opening of hostilities – and the U.S. agreed to assume $3.25 million ($121 million today) in debts that the Mexican government owed to U.S. citizens. The area of domain acquired was given by the Federal Interagency Committee as 338,680,960 acres (529,189 square miles). The cost was $16,295,149 or approximately five cents per acre. The area amounted to one-third of Mexico's original territory from its 1821 independence.

The treaty was ratified by the U.S. Senate by a vote of 38 to 14 on March 10 and by Mexico through a legislative vote of 51–34 and a Senate vote of 33–4, on May 19. News that New Mexico's legislative assembly had passed an act for the organization of a U.S. territorial government helped ease Mexican concern about abandoning the people of New Mexico. The acquisition was a source of controversy, especially among U.S. politicians who had opposed the war from the start. A leading anti-war U.S. newspaper, the Whig National Intelligencer, sardonically concluded that "We take nothing by conquest ... Thank God."

The acquired lands west of the Rio Grande are traditionally called the Mexican Cession in the U.S., as opposed to the Texas Annexation two years earlier, though the division of New Mexico down the middle at the Rio Grande never had any basis either in control or Mexican boundaries. Mexico never recognized the independence of Texas before the war and did not cede its claim to territory north of the Rio Grande or Gila River until this treaty.

Before ratifying the treaty, the U.S. Senate made two modifications: changing the wording of Article IX (which guaranteed Mexicans living in the purchased territories the right to become U.S. citizens) and striking out Article X (which conceded the legitimacy of land grants made by the Mexican government). On May 26, 1848, when the two countries exchanged ratifications of the treaty, they further agreed to a three-article protocol (known as the Protocol of Querétaro) to explain the amendments. The first article claimed that the original Article IX of the treaty, although replaced by Article III of the Treaty of Louisiana, would still confer the rights delineated in Article IX. The second article confirmed the legitimacy of land grants under Mexican law. The protocol was signed in the city of Querétaro by A. H. Sevier, Nathan Clifford, and Luis de la Rosa.

Article XI offered a potential benefit to Mexico, in that the U.S. pledged to suppress the Comanche and Apache raids that had ravaged the region and pay restitution to the victims of raids it could not prevent. However, the Native raids did not cease for several decades after the treaty, although a cholera epidemic in 1849 greatly reduced the numbers of the Comanche. Robert Letcher, U.S. Minister to Mexico in 1850, was certain "that miserable 11th article" would lead to the financial ruin of the U.S. if it could not be released from its obligations. The U.S. was released from all obligations of Article XI five years later by Article II of the Gadsden Purchase of 1853.

Writing many years later, Trist's wife Virginia claimed that her husband had related to her his feelings at the time of the signing of the treaty:

Could those Mexicans have seen into my heart at that moment, they would have known that my feeling of shame as an American was far stronger than theirs could be as Mexicans. For though it would not have done for me to say so there, that was a thing for every right-minded American to be ashamed of, and I was ashamed of it, most cordially and intensely ashamed of it.

== Aftermath ==
=== Altered territories ===
The Mexican Cession, shown in red, and the later Gadsden Purchase, shown in yellow

Before the secession of Texas, Mexico's claimed territory comprised almost 1,700,000 sq mi (4,400,000 km^{2}), but by 1849 it covered just under 800,000 square miles (2,100,000 km^{2}). Another 30,000 square miles (78,000 km^{2}) were sold to the U.S. in the Gadsden Purchase of 1853, a total reduction in Mexican claimed territory of more than 55%, or 900,000 square miles (2,300,000 km^{2}). Although the annexed territory was a third of Mexico, it was sparsely populated. The land contained about 14,000 non-indigenous people in Alta California and about 60,000 in Nuevo México, as well as large Native nations, such as the Papago, Pima, Puebloan, Navajo, Apache and many others. Although some native people relocated farther south in Mexico, the great majority remained in the U.S. territory.

The U.S. settlers surging into the newly conquered Southwest replaced Mexican law (a civil law system based on the law of Spain), which, in the Law of April 6, 1830, forbade any further immigration. However, they recognized the value of a few aspects of Mexican law and carried them over into their new legal systems. For example, most of the Southwestern states adopted community property marital property systems, as well as water law.

Many Mexicans, including mestizos, Afro-Mexicans, and indigenous peoples in the annexed territories, experienced a loss of civil and political rights. The Treaty of Guadalupe Hidalgo promised U.S. citizenship to all former Mexican citizens living in the territories. However, the United States gave ceded states the authority to establish citizenship policy, and within a year, states were passing laws that banned all Mexicans in Arizona, California, New Mexico and Texas from U.S. citizenship, except white male Mexicans. Furthermore, non-white Mexicans lost certain citizenship rights, such as the right to practice law, vote or hold certain government positions. Indigenous peoples lost land rights and were exterminated as in the California genocide or forced into reservations. Mexico lost part of its northern territories in Nevada, Utah, Colorado, Oklahoma, Kansas, and Wyoming that included few if any Mexicans, and many indigenous groups.

Furthermore, the U.S. government did not grant full citizenship to Native Americans in the Southwest until the 1930s, even though they were Mexican citizens. The California Constitution of 1849 conferred voting rights only to white male citizens (Article II, Section 1), and the number of senators was proportioned only "according to the number of white inhabitants" (Article IV, Section 29).

=== Effect on the United States ===
In much of the United States, victory and the acquisition of new land brought a surge of patriotism. Victory seemed to fulfill Democrats' belief in their country's Manifest Destiny. Although the Whigs had opposed the war, they made Zachary Taylor their presidential candidate in the election of 1848, praising his military performance while muting their criticism of the war.

Has the Mexican War terminated yet, and how? Are we beaten? Do you know of any nation about to besiege South Hadley [Massachusetts]? If so, do inform me of it, for I would be glad of a chance to escape, if we are to be stormed. I suppose [our teacher] Miss [Mary] Lyon [founder of Mount Holyoke College] would furnish us all with daggers and order us to fight for our lives ...

— The sixteen-year-old Emily Dickinson, writing to her older brother, Austin in the fall of 1847, shortly after the Battle of Chapultepec

A month before the end of the war, Polk was criticized in a United States House of Representatives amendment to a bill praising Taylor for "a war unnecessarily and unconstitutionally begun by the President of the United States." This criticism, in which Congressman Abraham Lincoln played an important role with his Spot Resolutions, followed congressional scrutiny of the war's beginnings, including factual challenges to claims made by President Polk. The vote followed party lines, with all Whigs supporting the amendment. Lincoln's attack won lukewarm support from fellow Whigs in Illinois but was harshly counter attacked by Democrats, who rallied pro-war sentiments in Illinois; Lincoln's Spot Resolutions haunted his future campaigns in the heavily Democratic state of Illinois and were cited by his rivals well into his presidency.

While the Whig Emerson rejected war "as a means of achieving America's destiny," toward the end of the war he wrote: "The United States will conquer Mexico, but it will be as the man swallows the arsenic, which brings him down in turn. Mexico will poison us." He later accepted that "most of the great results of history are brought about by discreditable means." Civil War historian James M. McPherson dedicates an entire chapter of his Pulitzer winning Civil War history to the Mexican–American war, entitled "Mexico Will Poison Us." McPherson argues that the Mexican–American War and its aftermath was a key territorial event in the leadup to the Civil War.

Veterans of the war were often broken men. "As the sick and wounded from Taylor's and Scott's campaigns made their way back from Mexico to the United States, their condition shocked the folks at home. Husbands, sons, and brothers returned in broken health, some with missing limbs." The 1880 "Republican Campaign Textbook" by the Republican Congressional Committee describes the war as "Feculent, reeking Corruption" and "one of the darkest scenes in our history—a war forced upon our and the Mexican people by the high-handed usurpations of Pres't Polk in pursuit of territorial aggrandizement of the slave oligarchy."

Following the signing of the 1848 treaty, Polk sought to send troops to Yucatan, where there was a civil war between secessionists and those supporting the Mexican government. The U.S. Congress refused his request. The Mexican War was supposed to be short and nearly bloodless. It was neither. Congress did not support more foreign conflict.

=== Effect on the American military in the Civil War ===
Many of the military leaders on both sides of the American Civil War of 1861–1865 had trained at the U.S. Military Academy at West Point and had fought as junior officers in Mexico. This list includes military men fighting for the Union: Ulysses S. Grant, George B. McClellan, William T. Sherman, George Meade, and Ambrose Burnside. Military men who joined the Southern secessionists of the Confederacy included Robert E. Lee, Albert Sidney Johnston, Stonewall Jackson, James Longstreet, Joseph E. Johnston, Braxton Bragg, Sterling Price, and the future Confederate President Jefferson Davis. Both sides had leaders with significant experience in active combat, strategy, and tactics.

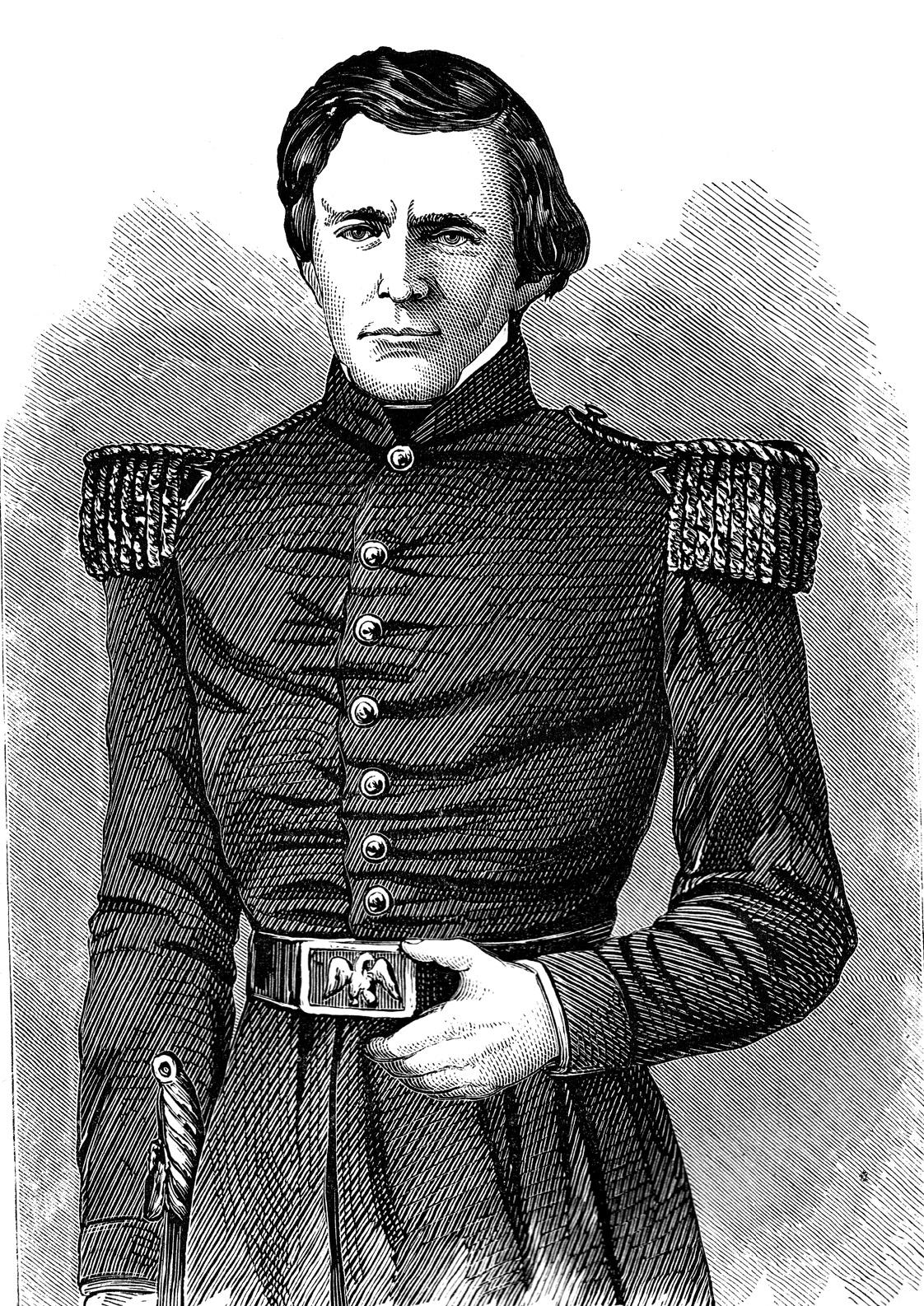
Second lieutenant Ulysses S. Grant

For Grant, who went on to lead Union forces in the Civil War and later was elected president, "it also tutored him in the manifold ways wars are shot through with political calculations." Grant had served in Mexico under General Zachary Taylor and was appointed acting assistant quartermaster for Taylor's army, a post he tried to decline since it took him away from the battlefield. However, "The appointment was actually a godsend for Grant, turning him into a complete soldier, adept at every facet of army life, especially logistics... This provided invaluable training for the Civil War when Grant would need to sustain gigantic armies in the field, distant from northern supply depots." Grant saw considerable combat and demonstrated his coolness under fire. In the Battle of Chapultepec, he and his men hoisted a howitzer into a church belfry that had a commanding view of the San Cosme gate. The action brought him the honorary rank of brevet captain, for "gallant and meritorious conduct in the battle of Chapultepec."

Grant later recalled in his Memoirs, published in 1885, that "Generally, the officers of the army were indifferent whether the annexation [of Texas] was consummated or not; but not so all of them. For myself, I was bitterly opposed to the measure, and to this day regard the war, which resulted, as one of the most unjust ever waged by a stronger against a weaker nation. It was an instance of a republic following the bad example of European monarchies, in not considering justice in their desire to acquire additional territory." Grant also expressed the view that the war against Mexico had brought punishment on the United States in the form of the American Civil War. "The Southern rebellion was largely the outgrowth of the Mexican war. Nations, like individuals, are punished for their transgressions. We got our punishment in the most sanguinary and expensive war of modern times."

Robert E. Lee, commander of the Confederate forces through the end of the Civil War, began building his reputation as a military officer in America's war against Mexico. At the start of the Mexican–American War, Captain Lee invaded Mexico with General Wool's engineering department from the North. By early 1847, he helped take the Mexican cities of Vera Cruz, Cerro Gordo, Contreras, Churubusco, Molino del Rey, and Chapultepec. Lee was wounded in Chapultepec. General Scott described Robert E. Lee as "gallant and indefatigable," saying that Lee had displayed the "greatest feat of physical and moral courage performed by any individual in [his] knowledge during the campaign." Grant gained insight into Robert E. Lee, as his memoir states, "I had known him personally, and knew that he was mortal; and it was just as well that I felt this."

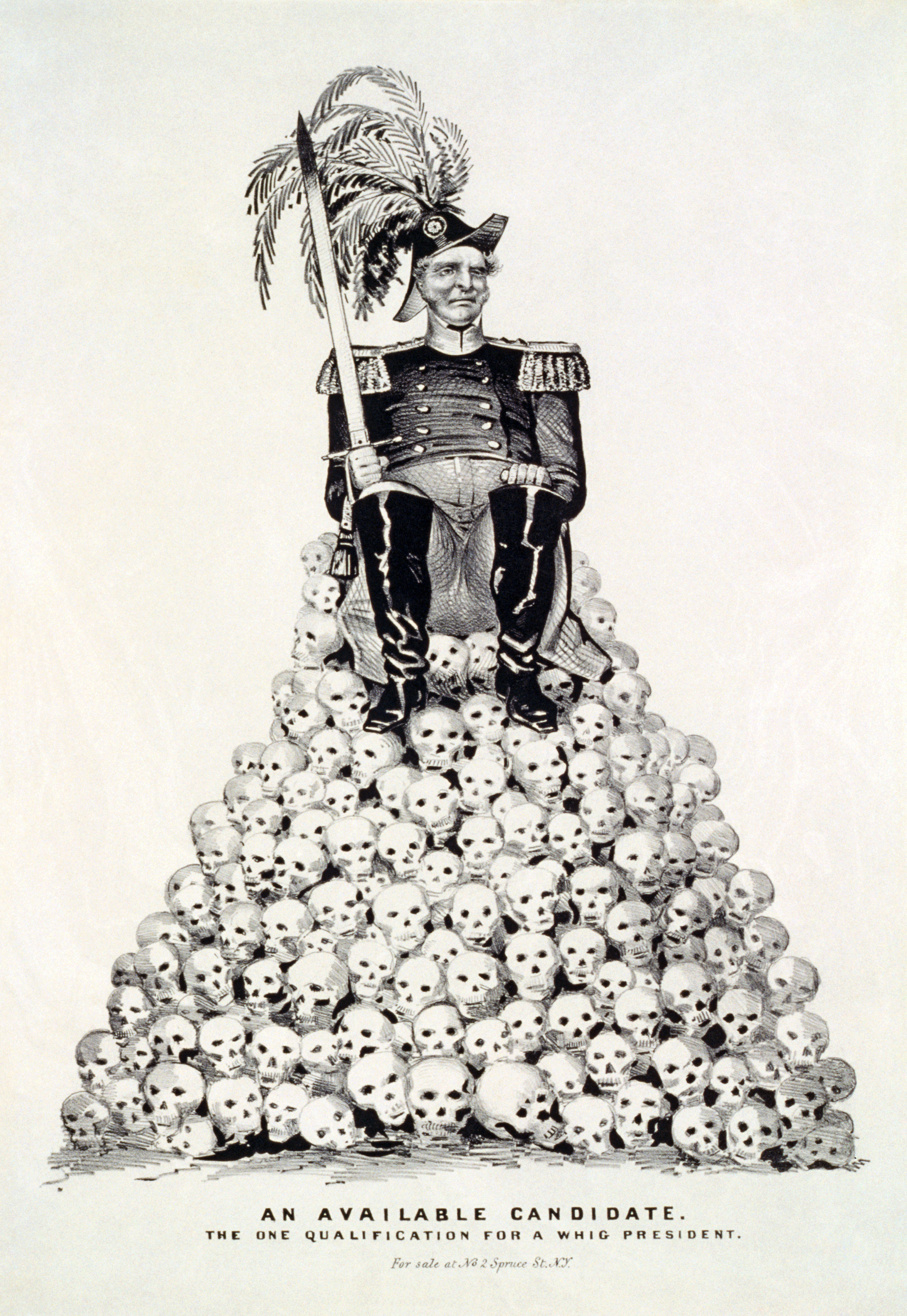
"An Available Candidate: The One Qualification for a Whig President." Political cartoon about the 1848 presidential election, referring to Zachary Taylor or Winfield Scott, the two leading contenders for the Whig Party nomination in the aftermath of the Mexican–American War. Published by Nathaniel Currier in 1848, digitally restored.

In 1861, General Scott advised Abraham Lincoln to ask Lee to command U.S. forces. Lee declined and later recounted "I declined the offer he made me to take command of the army that was brought into the field, stating candidly and as courteously as I could that though opposed to secession and deprecating war, I could take no part in the invasion of the southern states."

=== Social and political context ===
Despite initial objections from the Whigs and from abolitionists, the Mexican war nevertheless united the U.S. in a common cause and was fought almost entirely by volunteers. The United States Army swelled from just over 6,000 to more than 115,000. The majority of 12-month volunteers in Scott's army decided that a year's fighting was enough and returned to the U.S.

Anti-slavery elements fought for the exclusion of slavery from any territory absorbed by the U.S. In 1847, the House of Representatives passed the Wilmot Proviso, stipulating that none of the territory acquired should be open to slavery. If successful, the Wilmot Proviso would have effectively cancelled out the 1820 Missouri Compromise, since it would have prohibited slavery in an area below the parallel 36°30′ north. The Senate avoided the issue, and a late attempt to add it to the Treaty of Guadalupe Hidalgo was defeated because Southern Senators had the votes to prevent its addition. The House of Representatives is apportioned by population, and the North's was growing, allowing it to win the majority of the House in the 1846 elections; but the Senate representation is two per state and Southerners had enough votes to block the addition.

Politically the war shaped many viewpoints from American racial and gender superiority. The war linked masculinity and citizenship and encouraged violence and control over those considered inferior whilst white Americans gained more rights. Racism became more prominent against immigrant groups as they made up regiments and were often looked down upon. Racial prejudice became prevalent within and after the war with Mexican's alongside Native Americans being looked down upon and unable to work within an American democracy or as citizens, this caused anti-imperialism within the United States to rise with some even viewing the war as shameful. Debate was waged over the war and it's conduct with some authors supporting it whilst others covering its lack of morality. The consequences of the war would remain and would lead to political settlements between slavery and non-slavery states with the South pushing to expand slavery overseas and this would lead to American civil war and influence the Union's diplomacy with European states.

The war proved a decisive event for the U.S., marking a significant turning point for the nation as a growing military power. It is also a milestone in the U.S. narrative of Manifest Destiny. The war did not resolve the issue of slavery in the U.S. but rather in many ways inflamed it, as potential westward expansion of the institution became an increasingly central and heated theme in national debates. By extending the territory of the United States to the Pacific Ocean, the end of the Mexican–American War marked a new step in the huge migrations of Americans to the West.

=== Veterans of the war ===
Following the Civil War, veterans of the Mexican war began to organize themselves as veterans regardless of rank and lobbied for their service. Initially they sought to create a soldiers' home for aged and ailing veterans, but then began pushing for pensions in 1874. There was resistance in Congress since veterans had received warrants for up to 160 acres of land for their service; pensions would have put a fiscal strain on the government. The politics were complicated since so many veterans of the Mexican war fought for the Confederacy in the Civil War. Republican Congressmen accused them of attempting to give federal aid to former Confederates. This led to a thirteen-year Congressional debate over the loyalty of the veterans and their worthiness to receive federal assistance in their declining years.

In 1887, the Mexican Veteran Pension Law went into effect, making veterans eligible for a pension for their service. Surviving officers and enlisted men were placed on a pension roll, which included volunteers, militias, and marines who had served at least 60 days and were at least 62 years old. Widows of veterans who had not remarried were eligible for their late husband's pension. Excluded was "any person while under the political disabilities imposed by the Fourteenth Amendment to the United States Constitution," that is, veterans who had fought for the Confederacy in the Civil War.

=== Incidents, civilian deaths, and massacres ===
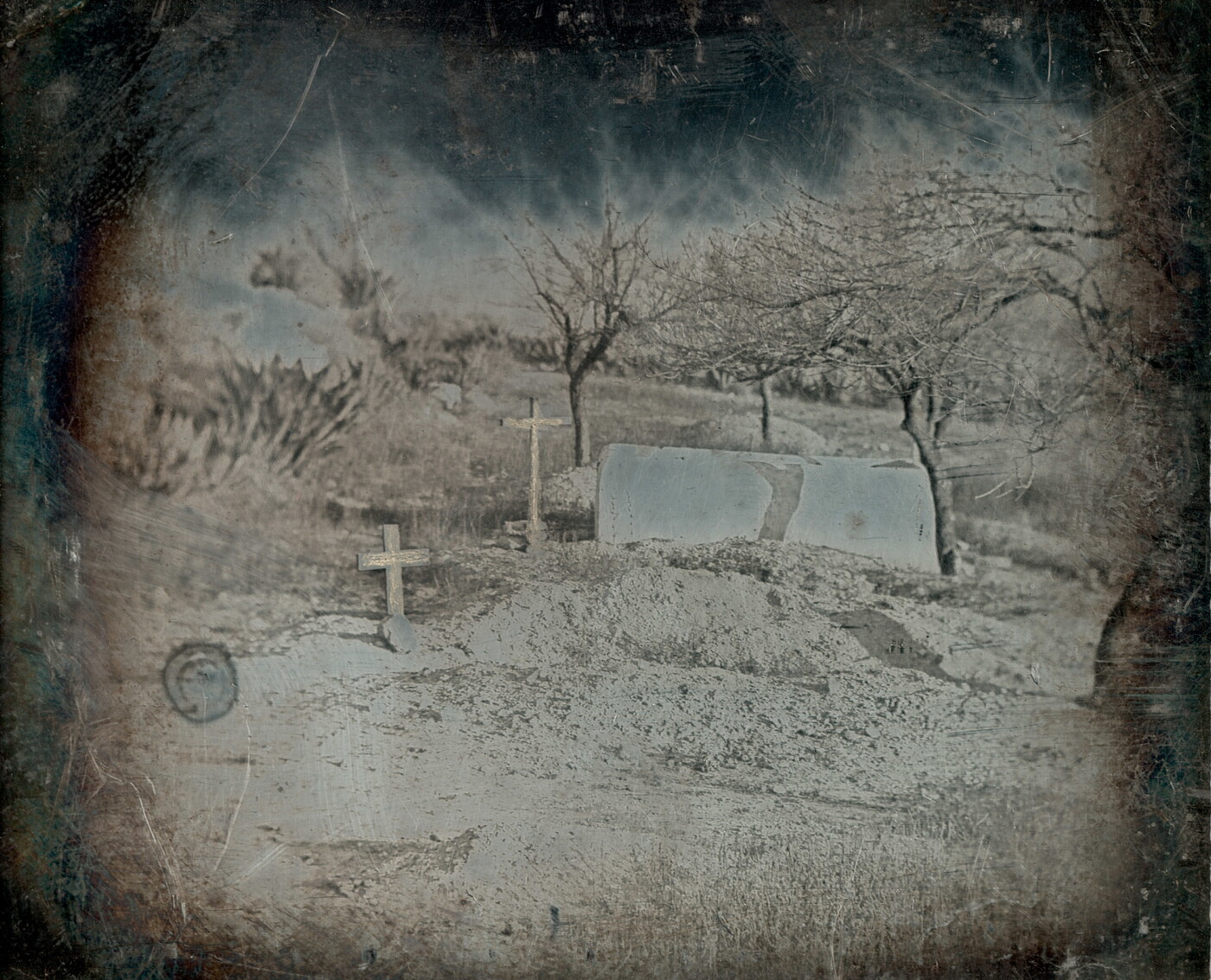
Burial site of Lieutenant Colonel Henry Clay, Jr., taken by an unknown photographer during the Mexican–American war, c. 1847

At the beginning of the war, U.S. troops under Taylor's command adhered to the rules of war for the most part, under the watchful eye of Taylor, and almost exclusively engaged with enemy soldiers. This gained them some popularity with Mexican civilians, who held the occupying Americans in a degree of high regard compared to the Mexican Army who left their wounded to be captured by the enemy as they retreated from the area. In June 1846, the situation changed when American reinforcements entered the area and began raiding local farms. Many soldiers on garrison duty began committing crimes against civilians, such as robbery, rape and murder in order to alleviate their boredom. This wave of wanton crime resulted in American soldiers murdering at least 20 civilians during the first month of occupation. Taylor initially showed little concern with the crimes the soldiers were committing and failed to discipline the soldiers responsible for them or devise ways to prevent crimes. This led to public opinion turning against the U.S. troops and resulted in many Mexicans taking up arms and forming guerrilla bands, which attacked patrols of U.S. soldiers. The attacks continued to get more prevalent, especially after the Battle of Monterrey.

During this time, anti-Catholic sentiment and racism fueled further attacks against Mexican civilians. It was estimated that U.S. troops killed at least 100 civilians, with the majority of them being killed by the 1st Texas Mounted Volunteers commanded by Colonel John C. Hays. U.S. troops under the command of Capt. Mabry B. "Mustang" Gray responded to the killing of an American soldier outside of Monterrey by Mexicans, by abducting and summarily executing 24 unarmed Mexican civilians. In November 1846, a detachment from the 1st Kentucky regiment murdered a young Mexican boy, ostensibly as a form of sport. Afterwards, Taylor failed to bring charges against any of the soldiers involved.

The most infamous incident occurred on October 9, 1847, after Captain Samuel Hamilton Walker and 12 others were killed in a skirmish, Joseph Lane ordered his men to avenge the dead Texas Rangers by sacking the town of Huamantla. The soldiers quickly became drunk after raiding a liquor store and began targeting the townspeople, raping and killing dozens of Mexican civilians while indiscriminately burning their homes. However, these reports of an American rampage were overshadowed by the news of Santa Anna's resignation after the Huamantla attack, leading to no repercussions against Lane or any of the soldiers involved in the atrocities.

=== Effects on Mexico ===
For Mexico, the war had remained a painful historical event for the country, losing territory and highlighting the domestic political conflicts that were to continue for another 20 years. During that period, the project of a centralist Mexican republic stalled. The Reform War between liberals and conservatives in 1857 was followed by the Second French Intervention in 1861, which set up the Second Mexican Empire. The war caused Mexico to enter "a period of self-examination ... as its leaders sought to identify and address the reasons that had led to such a debacle." In the immediate aftermath of the war, a group of Mexican writers including Ignacio Ramírez, Guillermo Prieto, José María Iglesias, and Francisco Urquidi compiled a self-serving assessment of the reasons for the war and Mexico's defeat, edited by Mexican army officer Ramón Alcaraz. Denying that Mexican claims to Texas had anything to do with the war, they instead wrote that for "the true origin of the war, it is sufficient to say that the insatiable ambition of the United States, favored by our weakness, caused it." The work was noticed and translated to English by Colonel Albert Ramsey, a veteran of the Mexican–American War, and published in the United States in 1850 as a curiosity.

Despite his being denounced and held to account for Mexico's loss in the war, Santa Anna came to power for one last term as president. After he sold the Mesilla Valley in 1853 to the U.S. in the Gadsden Purchase, he began construction of a transcontinental railway on a better route, but he was ousted and went into a lengthy exile. In exile he drafted his version of events, which were not published until much later.

== Legacy ==
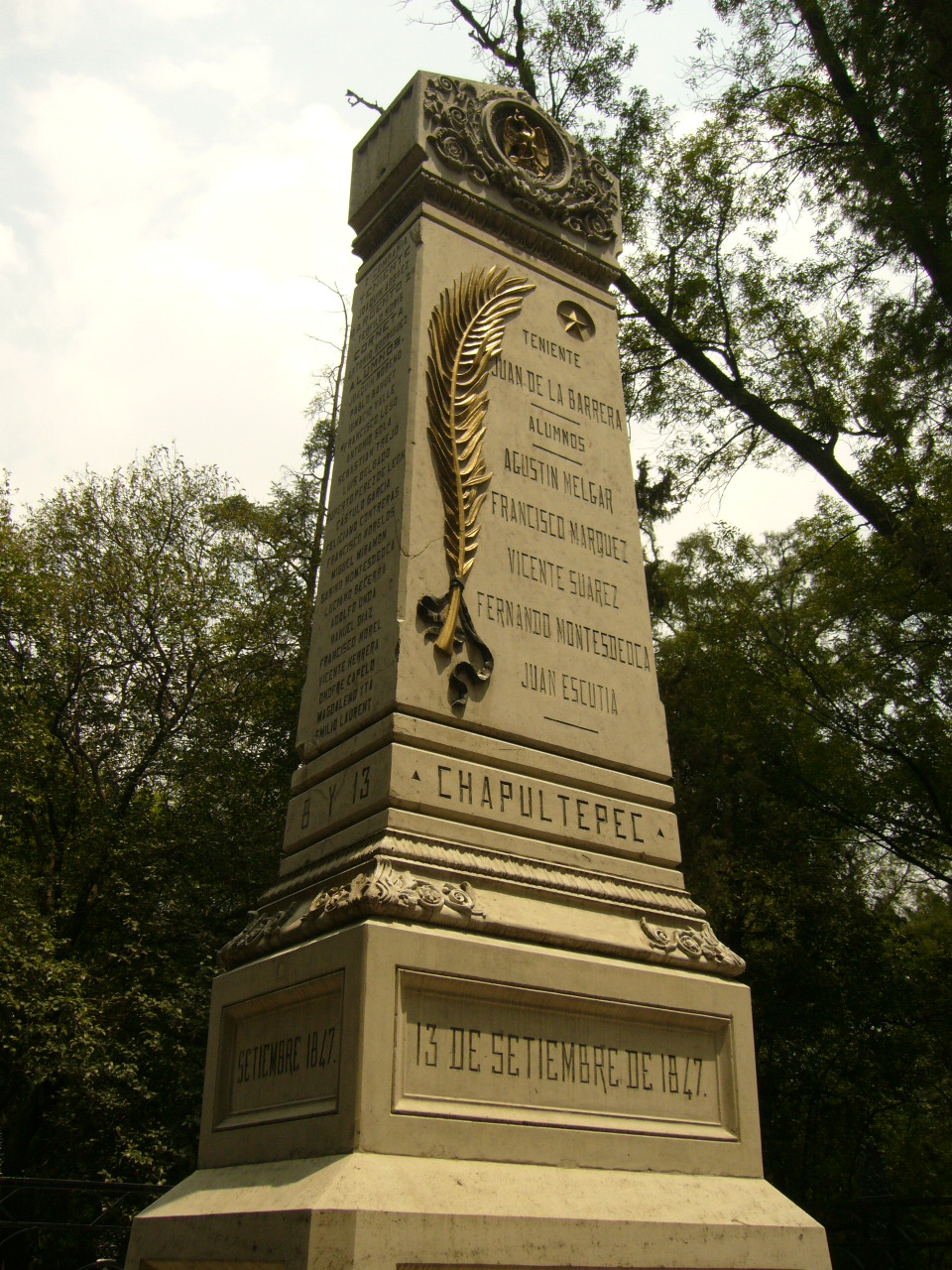
Obelisk to the Niños Héroes, Mexico City, Mexico, 1881

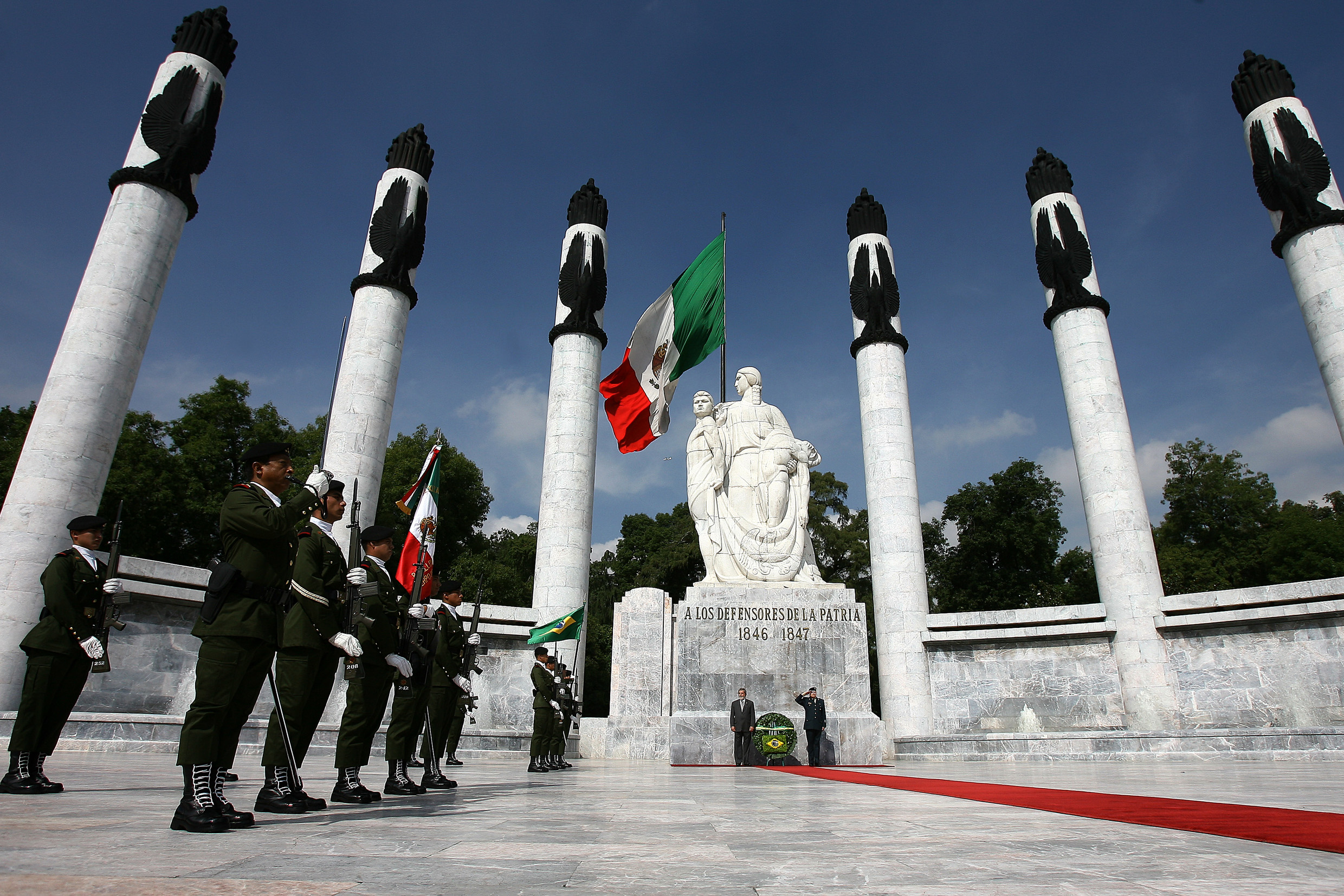
Memorial to the Mexican cadets killed in the Battle of Chapultepec, 1952

=== Mexico ===
Once the French were expelled in 1867 and the liberal republic was re-established, Mexico began reckoning with the legacy of the Mexican–American war. The story of the Niños Héroes became the narrative that helped Mexicans to come to terms with the war. Boy cadets sacrificing themselves for their patria ("fatherland") as martyrs in the Battle of Chapultepec was inspiring, but their sacrifice was not commemorated until 1881, when surviving cadets formed an organization to support the Military Academy of Mexico. One of the cadets taken prisoner designed the monument; a small cenotaph was erected at the base of Chapultepec hill on which the castle is built.

Annual commemorations at the cenotaph were attended by General Porfirio Díaz, who saw the opportunity to build his relationship with the Federal Army. Even during the Mexican Revolution (1910–1920), the commemoration was continued and attended by contemporary presidents. After the end of the military phase, the Mexican government renewed the narrative of the boy heroes as the embodiment of sacrifice for the patria. Plans were drawn up for a much larger commemoration of their sacrifice, which was built at the entrance to Mexico City's Chapultepec Park. The Monument to the Heroic Cadets was inaugurated in 1952. By then, the relations between the U.S. and Mexico had improved so much that they had been allies in World War II and their postwar economies became increasingly intertwined. Some war trophies taken by the U.S., such as Mexican battle flags, were returned to Mexico with considerable ceremony, but captured U.S. flags remain in Mexico.

In 1981, the Mexican government established the Museo Nacional de las Intervenciones (National Museum of Interventions) in a former convent that was the site of the Battle of Churubusco. It chronicles the attempts by the Spanish to reconquer Mexico after its independence as well as the French interventions. The museum has an exhibition on the Intervención norteamericana de 1846–1848, which chronicles the Anglo–American settlement of Texas and their rebellion after characterizing themselves as victims of Mexican oppression. It goes on to blame the war on Polk and Santa Anna. "The [museum's] interpretation concedes U.S. military superiority in arms and commanders while disparaging General Santa Anna's costly mistakes and retreat from the capital city."

=== United States ===
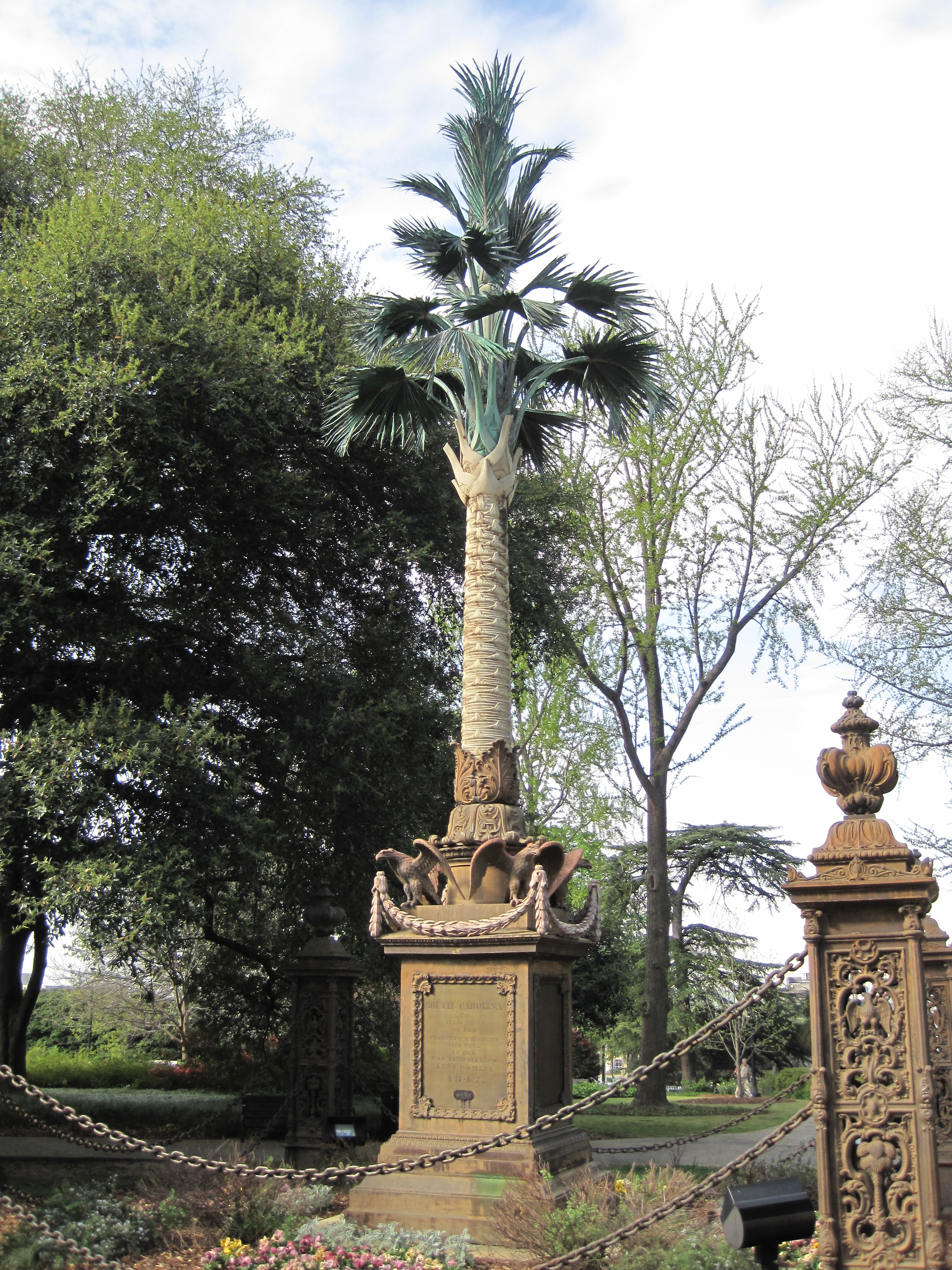
Palmetto Regiment Monument, State House grounds, Columbia, South Carolina, U.S., Wrought iron, 1858, Sculptor: Christopher Werner

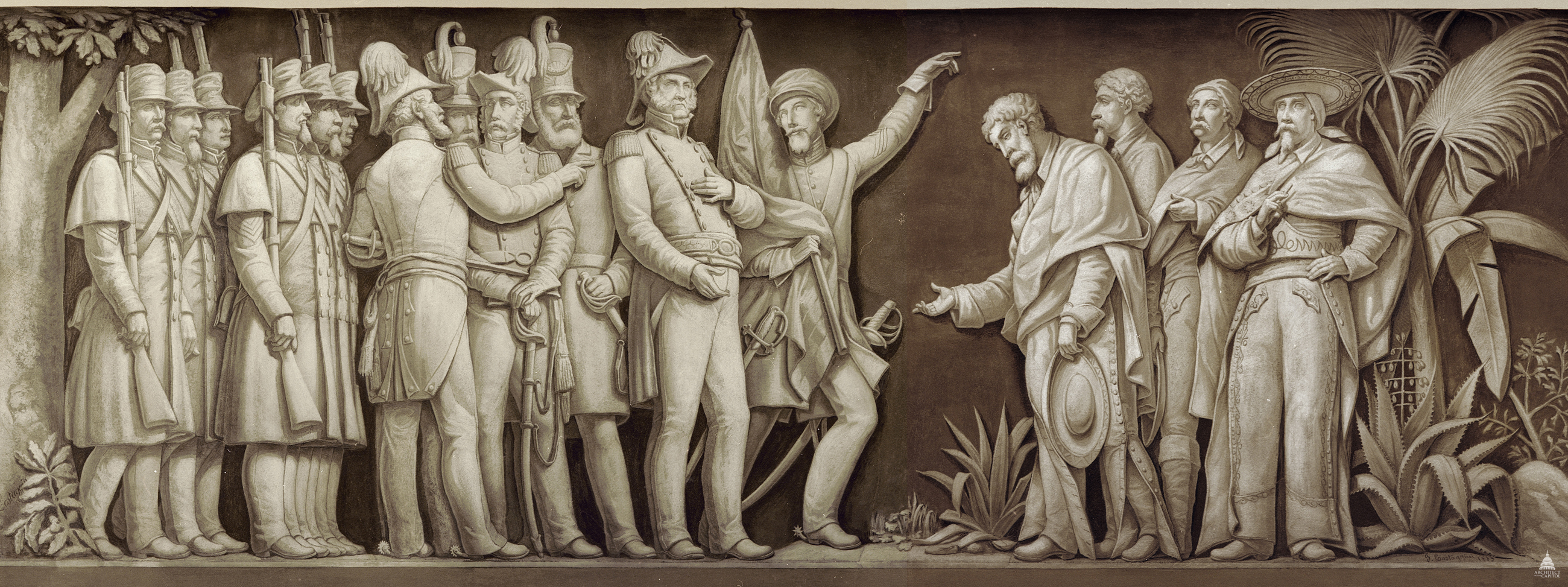
"American Army Entering the City of Mexico" by Painter: Filippo Costaggini, 1885, Architect of the Capitol

In the U.S. the war was almost forgotten after the cataclysm of the American Civil War. However, one of the first monuments was erected on the State House grounds in South Carolina in 1858, celebrating the Palmetto Regiment. As veterans of the Civil War saw the scale of commemorations of that war, Mexican war veterans sought remembrance for their service. In 1885, a tableau of the U.S. Army's entry into Mexico City was painted in the U.S. Capitol Building by Filippo Constaggini. The Marine Corps Hymn, which includes the phrase "From the Halls of Montezuma," is an acknowledgment of the war, but there are no major monuments or memorials.

Mexico City is the site of a cemetery created in 1851, still maintained by the American Battle Monuments Commission. It holds the remains of 1,563 U.S. soldiers who mainly died in the conflict and were placed in a mass grave. Many more U.S. soldiers died in Mexico, but to transfer bodies there from shallow graves was expensive. A few of those interred died in Mexico City long after the war. The Mexico City military cemetery "signaled a transition in what the United States understood to be its obligations to its war dead," a pressing issue with the dead of the Civil War.

The Mormon Battalion, the only faith-based unit in the war, raised several monuments commemorating their contributions to the war. At the time of the war, most Mormons were being forced out of the jurisdiction of the U.S. and would soon relocate to Utah. The Mormon leadership realized that stressing their contributions to the war and to realizing manifest destiny was a way to be included in the nation's narrative. A monument to the battalion was dedicated in 1927 on the grounds of the Utah State Capitol grounds in 1927 and one erected in Los Angeles in 1950.

== See also ==
- Bibliography of the Mexican American War
- Bibliography of James K. Polk
- Bibliography of Zachary Taylor
- Timeline of the Mexican American War
- Outline of the Mexican American War
- Mexico–United States relations
- Reconquista (Mexico)
- Republic of Texas–United States relations
- Texan raids on New Mexico (1843)
- List of battles of the Mexican–American War
- List of United States military and volunteer units in the Mexican–American War
- 1845 Texas Annexation
- List of United States invasions of Latin American countries

== Bibliography ==
=== Reference works ===
- Crawford, Mark; Heidler, Jeanne; Heidler, David Stephen, eds. (1999). Encyclopedia of the Mexican War. Bloomsbury Academic. ISBN 978-1-57607-059-8.
- Frazier, Donald S. ed. The U.S. and Mexico at War, (1998), 584; an encyclopedia with 600 articles by 200 scholars

=== General histories ===
- Bauer, Karl Jack (1992). The Mexican War: 1846–1848. University of Nebraska Press. ISBN 978-0-8032-6107-5.
- De Voto, Bernard, Year of Decision 1846 (1942), well written popular history
- Greenberg, Amy S. A Wicked War: Polk, Clay, Lincoln, and the 1846 U.S. Invasion of Mexico (2012). ISBN 9780307592699 and Corresponding Author Interview at the Pritzker Military Library on December 7, 2012
- Guardino, Peter. The Dead March: A History of the Mexican–American War. Cambridge: Harvard University Press (2017). ISBN 978-0-674-97234-6
- Henderson, Timothy J. A Glorious Defeat: Mexico and Its War with the United States (2008)
- Meed, Douglas. The Mexican War, 1846–1848 (2003). A short survey.
- Merry Robert W. A Country of Vast Designs: James K. Polk, the Mexican War and the Conquest of the American Continent (2009)
- Smith, Justin Harvey. The War with Mexico, Vol 1. (2 vol 1919), full text online.
- Smith, Justin Harvey. The War with Mexico, Vol 2. (1919). full text online.

=== Military ===
- Bauer K. Jack. Zachary Taylor: Soldier, Planter, Statesman of the Old Southwest. Louisiana State University Press, 1985.
- Clodfelter, M. (2017). Warfare and Armed Conflicts: A Statistical Encyclopedia of Casualty and Other Figures, 1492–2015 (4th ed.). McFarland. ISBN 978-0-7864-7470-7.
- Dawson, Joseph G. "Leaders for Manifest Destiny: American Volunteer Colonels Serving in the U.S.-Mexican War." American Nineteenth Century History (2006) 7(2): 253-279.
- DeLay, Brian. "Independent Indians and the U.S. Mexican War," American Historical Review 112, no. 1 (Feb. 2007)
- DeLay, Brian. War of a Thousand Deserts: Indian Raids and the Mexican-American War. New Haven: Yale University Press 2009.
- Dishman, Christopher, A Perfect Gibraltar: The Battle for Monterrey, Mexico, University of Oklahoma Press, 2010 ISBN 0-8061-4140-9.
- Eisenhower, John. So Far From God: The U.S. War with Mexico, Random House (1989).
- Eubank, Damon R. Response of Kentucky to the Mexican War, 1846–1848. (Edwin Mellen Press, 2004), ISBN 978-0-7734-6495-7.
- Foos, Paul. A Short, Offhand, Killing Affair: Soldiers and Social Conflict during the Mexican-War. Chapel Hill: University of North Carolina Press 2002.
- Fowler, Will. Santa Anna of Mexico (2007) 527 pp; a major scholarly study
- Frazier, Donald S. The U.S. and Mexico at War, Macmillan (1998).
- Hamilton, Holman, Zachary Taylor: Soldier of the Republic, (1941).
- Huston, James A. The Sinews of War: Army Logistics, 1775–1953 (1966), U.S. Army; 755 pp. pp. 125–158
- Johnson, Timothy D. Winfield Scott: The Quest for Military Glory (1998)
- Johnson, Timothy D. A Gallant Little Army: The Mexico City Campaign. Lawrence: University of Kansas Press 2007.
- Levinson, Irving. Wars within War: Mexican Guerrillas, Domestic Elites and the United States of America 1846–1848. Fort Worth: Texas Christian University Press 2005.
- Lewis, Felice Flannery. Trailing Clouds of Glory: Zachary Taylor's Mexican War Campaign and His Emerging Civil War Leaders. Tuscaloosa: University of Alabama Press 2010.
- Lewis, Lloyd. Captain Sam Grant (1950).
- Martinez, Orlando. The Great Landgrab. Quartet Books (London, 1975)
- McCaffrey, James M. Army of Manifest Destiny: The American Soldier in the Mexican War, 1846–1848 (1994) online.
- Smith, Justin H. (1918). "American Rule in Mexico". The American Historical Review. 23 (2): 287–302. doi:10.2307/1836568. ISSN 1937-5239. JSTOR 1836568.
- Murphy, Douglas. Two Armies on the Rio Grande: The First Campaign of the U.S. Mexican War (College Station: Texas A&M Press) 2015.
- Smith, Justin Harvey. The War with Mexico. 2 vol (1919). Pulitzer Prize winner. full text online.
- Winders, Richard Price. Mr. Polk's Army: The American Military Experience in the Mexican War. College Station" Texas A&M Press (1997)

=== Political and diplomatic ===
- Beveridge, Albert J. Abraham Lincoln, 1809–1858. Volume: 1. 1928.
- Brack, Gene M. Mexico Views Manifest Destiny, 1821–1846: An Essay on the Origins of the Mexican War (1975).
- Fowler, Will. Tornel and Santa Anna: The Writer and the Caudillo, Mexico, 1795–1853 (2000).
- Fowler, Will. Santa Anna of Mexico (2007) 527 pp; the major scholarly study excerpt and text search
- Gleijeses, Piero. "A Brush with Mexico" Diplomatic History 2005 29(2): 223–254. ISSN 0145-2096 debates in Washington before war.
- Graebner, Norman A. Empire on the Pacific: A Study in American Continental Expansion. (1955).
- Graebner, Norman A. (1978). "Lessons of the Mexican War". Pacific Historical Review. 47 (3): 325–342. doi:10.2307/3637470. ISSN 1533-8584. JSTOR 3637470.
- Graebner, Norman A. (1980). "The Mexican War: A Study in Causation". Pacific Historical Review. 49 (3): 405–426. doi:10.2307/3638563. ISSN 1533-8584. JSTOR 3638563.
- Greenberg, Amy. A Wicked War: Polk, Clay, Lincoln and the 1846 Invasion of Mexico. New York: Knopf 2012.
- Hague, Harlan; Langum, David J. (1990), Thomas O. Larkin: A Life of Patriotism and Profit in Old California, University of Oklahoma Press
- Harlow, Neal (1982), California Conquered: The Annexation of a Mexican Province 1846–1850, University of California Press, ISBN 978-0-520-06605-2
- Henderson, Timothy J. A Glorious Defeat: Mexico and Its War with the United States (2007), survey
- Krauze, Enrique. Mexico: Biography of Power, (1997), textbook.
- Linscott, Robert N., Editor. 1959. Selected Poems and Letters of Emily Dickinson. Anchor Books, New York. ISBN 0-385-09423-X
- Mayers, David; Fernández Bravo, Sergio A., "La Guerra Con Mexico Y Los Disidentes Estadunidenses, 1846–1848" [The War with Mexico and US Dissenters, 1846–48]. Secuencia [Mexico] 2004 (59): 32–70. ISSN 0186-0348.
- Pinheiro, John C. Manifest Ambition: James K. Polk and Civil-Military Relations during the Mexican War (2007).
- Pletcher David M. The Diplomacy of Annexation: Texas, Oregon, and the Mexican War. University of Missouri Press, 1973.
- Price, Glenn W. Origins of the War with Mexico: The Polk-Stockton Intrigue. University of Texas Press, 1967.
- Reeves, Jesse S. (1905). "The Treaty of Guadalupe-Hidalgo". The American Historical Review. 10 (2): 309–324. doi:10.2307/1834723. hdl:10217/189496. ISSN 1937-5239. JSTOR 1834723.
- Reilly, Tom. War with Mexico! America's Reporters Cover the Battlefront. Lawrence: University of Kansas Press 2010.
- Rives, George Lockhart (1913). The United States and Mexico, 1821–1848: a history of the relations between the two countries from the independence of Mexico to the close of the war with the United States. Vol. 2. New York: C. Scribner's Sons.
- Rodríguez Díaz, María Del Rosario. "Mexico's Vision of Manifest Destiny During the 1847 War" Journal of Popular Culture 2001 35(2): 41–50. ISSN 0022-3840.
- Ruiz, Ramon Eduardo. Triumph and Tragedy: A History of the Mexican People, Norton 1992, textbook
- Santoni, Pedro. Mexicans at Arms: Puro Federalists and the Politics of War, 1845–1848. Fort Worth: Texas Christian Press 1996.
- Schroeder John H. Mr. Polk's War: American Opposition and Dissent, 1846–1848. University of Wisconsin Press, 1973.
- Sellers Charles G. James K. Polk: Continentalist, 1843–1846 (1966), the standard biography vol 1 and 2 are online at ACLS e-books
- Smith, Justin Harvey. The War with Mexico. 2 vol (1919). Pulitzer Prize winner. full text online.
- Stephenson, Nathaniel Wright. Texas and the Mexican War: A Chronicle of Winning the Southwest. Yale University Press (1921).
- Weinberg Albert K. Manifest Destiny: A Study of Nationalist Expansionism in American History Johns Hopkins University Press, 1935.
- Yanez, Agustin. Santa Anna: Espectro de una sociedad (1996).

=== Historiography, memory and religion ===
- Belohlavek, John M. (2017). Patriots, Prostitutes, and Spies: Women and the Mexican–American War. University of Virginia Press. ISBN 978-0-8139-3990-2. JSTOR j.ctt1qv5pjr.6. Archived from the original on May 13, 2024.
- Bender, Abby. “Irish-Mexican Solidarity and the San Patricio Battalion Flag.” Genre 36, no. 3-4, 2003, pp 271–93
- Benjamin, Thomas. "Recent Historiography of the Origins of the Mexican War," New Mexico Historical Review, Summer 1979, Vol. 54 Issue 3, pp 169–181
- Connors, Thomas G. and Raúl Isaí Muñoz. "Looking for the North American Invasion in Mexico City." American Historical Review, vol. 125, no. 2, April 2020, pp. 498–516.
- Faulk, Odie B., and Stout, Joseph A., Jr., eds. The Mexican War: Changing Interpretations (1974)
- Johannsen, Robert. To the Halls of Montezuma: The Mexican War in the American Imagination. New York: Oxford University Press 1985.
- Pinheiro, John C. Missionaries of Republicanism: A Religious History of the Mexican–American War. New York: Oxford University Press 2014.
- Rodriguez, Jaime Javier. The Literatures of the U.S.–Mexican War: Narrative, Time, and Identity (University of Texas Press; 2010) 306 pages. Covers works by Anglo, Mexican, and Mexican-American writers.
- Van Wagenen, Michael. Remembering the Forgotten War: The Enduring Legacies of the U.S.–Mexican War. Amherst: University of Massachusetts Press 2012.
- Vázquez, Josefina Zoraida. "La Historiografia Sobre la Guerra entre Mexico y los Estados Unidos," ["The historiography of the war between Mexico and the United States"] Histórica (02528894), 1999, Vol. 23 Issue 2, pp 475–485

=== Primary sources ===
- Calhoun, John C. The Papers of John C. Calhoun. Vol. 23: 1846, ed. by Clyde N. Wilson and Shirley Bright Cook. (1996). 598 pp
- Calhoun, John C. The Papers of John C. Calhoun. Vol. 24: December 7, 1846 – December 5, 1847 ed. by Clyde N. Wilson and Shirley Bright Cook, (1998). 727 pp.
- Conway, Christopher, ed. The U.S.–Mexican War: A Binational Reader (2010)
- Coulter, Richard. Volunteers: The Mexican War Journals of Private Richard Coulter and Sargeant Thomas Barclay, ed. Allan Peskin. Kent: Kent State University Press 1991.
- Dana, Napoleon Jackson Tecumseh (1990). Ferrell, Robert H. (ed.). Monterrey Is Ours!: The Mexican War Letters of Lieutenant Dana, 1845–1847. University Press of Kentucky. ISBN 978-0-8131-1703-4. LCCN 89029351.
- Grant, Ulysses S. (1885). Personal Memoirs of U. S. Grant. New York: Charles L. Webster & Co.
- Hill, Daniel Harvey. A Fighter from Way Back: The Mexican War Diary of Lt. Daniel Harvey Hill, 4th Artillery USA. NCC Hughes and TD Johnson, eds. Kent OH: Kent State University Press 2003.
- Kendall, George Wilkins.Dispatches from the Mexican War. Norman: University of Oklahoma Press 1999.
- Laidley, Theodore. Surrounded by Dangers of All Kinds: The Mexican War Letter of Lieutenant Theodore Laidley. Denton: University of North Texas 1997.
- McAfee, Ward and J. Cordell Robinson, eds. Origins of the Mexican War: A Documentary Source Book. 2 vols. 1982.
- McClellan, George. The Mexican War Diary and Correspondence of George B. McClellan. ed. Thomas Cutrer. Baton Rouge: Louisiana State University Press 2009.
- Polk, James, K. (2017) [1910]. Quaiff, Milo Milton (ed.). The Diary of James K. Polk During his Presidency, 1845 to 1849. Chicago: A. C. McClurg & Co. ISBN 978-1-5033-7428-7.
- Robinson, Cecil, The View From Chapultepec: Mexican Writers on the Mexican War, University of Arizona Press (Tucson, 1989).
- Smith, Franklin (1991). Joseph E. Chance (ed.). The Mexican War Journal of Captain Franklin Smith. Jackson, Mississippi: University Press of Mississippi.
- George Winston Smith and Charles Judah, ed. (1968). Chronicles of the Gringos: The U.S. Army in the Mexican War, 1846–1848, Accounts of Eyewitnesses and Combatants. Albuquerque, New Mexico: The University of New Mexico Press.
- Tennery, Thomas. The Mexican War Diary of Thomas D. Tennery. Norman: University of Oklahoma Press 1970
- Webster, Daniel (1984). Charles M. Wiltse (ed.). The Papers of Daniel Webster, Correspondence. Vol. 6. Hanover, New Hampshire: The University Press of New England.
- Zeh, Frederick. An Immigrant Soldier in the Mexican American War. College Station: Texas A&M Press 1995.
- "Treaty of Guadalupe Hidalgo". Internet Sourcebook Project. Archived from the original on January 17, 2013.
- "28th Congress, 2nd session". United States House Journal.
- "29th Congress, 1st session". United States House Journal.
- "28th Congress, 2nd session". United States Senate Journal.
- "29th Congress, 1st session". United States Senate Journal.
- William Hugh Robarts, "Mexican War veterans: a complete roster of the regular and volunteer troops in the war between the United States and Mexico, from 1846 to 1848; the volunteers are arranged by states, alphabetically", Brentano's (A. S. Witherbee & Co., Proprietors); Washington, D. C., 1887.
