= Ferdinand Poulton =

English Jesuit missionary (c. 1601–1641)

Ferdinand Poulton, S.J, (c. 1601 – June 5, 1641) was a Jesuit missionary in the newly founded Jesuit Mission of Maryland. He was born to a noble family in either 1601 or 1603 in Buckinghamshire, England, and was educated at the College of St. Omer in Artois, France. He entered the English College of Rome in 1619 for his higher education and joined the Society of Jesus in 1622. He was back at St. Omer's in 1633 and at Watten, Nord, in 1636. He completed his initiation into the Jesuit order on December 8, 1635. To help hide his identity from anti-Catholic authorities Poulton, like other Jesuits, used aliases including Father John Brooks (or Brock) and John Morgan, an alias that his uncle, who was also named Ferdinand Poulton, had previously used.

Poulton first arrived in British North America in 1638. He joined other Jesuits including Andrew White, Thomas Copley, John Altham Gravenor, and Thomas Gervase at the colony they had begun in 1634 near St. Mary's City, Maryland. He was quickly elected Superior of Mission, replacing Thomas Copley, though Copley would later retake this leadership role. While the Superior, Poulton was summoned by Cecilius Calvert, 2nd Baron Baltimore to attend the Maryland Assembly on September 19, 1640. Poulton lived primarily at the Jesuits' Proprietary at Mattapany on the Patuxent River.

He is also considered a forefather of Georgetown University, and was involved in teaching at the Jesuit school for the native tribes. Inquiring about patronage for their school, Poulton wrote to Vincenzo Carafa, the Superior General of the Society of Jesus in Rome under Pope Urban VIII. Carafa replied on September 15, 1640, and approved the institution of a school in principle. Poulton's plan for Catholic education was significantly more ambitious than that of the other Maryland Jesuits. However, he died after being accidentally shot while crossing the St. Mary's River in a small boat on June 5, 1641 (or possibly July 5).

His life in Maryland and his mysterious death were fictionalized in the 1995 book, Mary's Land by author Lucia St. Clair Robson. He also has a building named in his honor, Poulton Hall, on Georgetown's main campus.

== See also ==
- Jesuit missions in North America
