= Sam Houston and Native American relations =

Sam Houston's relationships with Native Americans

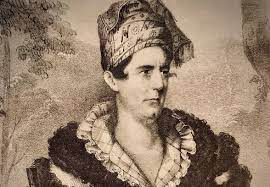
Sam Houston, a Cherokee Nation citizen also known as Colonneh, meaning "the Raven", ca. 1830

Sam Houston had a diverse relationship with Native Americans, particularly the Cherokee from Tennessee. He was an adopted son, and he was a negotiator, strategist, and creator of fair public policy for Native Americans as a legislator, governor and president of the Republic of Texas. He left his widowed mother's home around 1808 and was taken in by John Jolly, a leader of the Cherokee. Houston lived in Jolly's village for three years. He adopted Cherokee customs and traditions, which stressed the importance of being honest and fair, and he learned to speak the Cherokee language. He felt that Cherokees and other indigenous people had been short-changed during negotiation of treaties with United States government, the realization influenced his decisions as a military officer, treaty negotiator, and in his roles as governor of the states of Tennessee and Texas, and president of the Republic of Texas.

Houston was a protégé of Andrew Jackson. He fought alongside the Cherokee against the Creek at the Battle of Horseshoe Bend (1814), where he was injured. In 1817 and 1818, he negotiated and administered treaties that moved Cherokee people southwest to the Arkansas Territory. He practiced law for around ten years, was elected a congressman from Tennessee, and later was elected governor of the state. In 1829, Houston had a short-lived marriage with Eliza Allen. In April of that year, he resigned from his position as the governor of Tennessee. He returned to the Cherokee who were removed from Tennessee to the Indian Territory, based upon a treaty of 1828 (Treaty of Limits between Mexico and the United States). He became a legal citizen of the Cherokee Nation and lived like tribal members. He was an emissary to negotiate on the Cherokee's behalf with the United States government and other Native American tribes. He identified corrupt Indian agents and pressed for valid titles to the Cherokee's new lands in present-day Oklahoma. Houston married Diana Rogers Gentry according to Cherokee law in 1830, although he was still legally married to Eliza Allen under United States law. Houston and Diana operated a trading post at Wigwam Neosho near Fort Gibson, in what is now Oklahoma. He accepted a position to negotiate with the Comanche tribe in Texas in 1832.

The Alabama–Coushatta Tribe were among Houston's allies during the Texas Revolution. In 1836, the tribe provided provisions for Texans who fled Antonio López de Santa Anna's army during the Runaway Scrape, and they were also guides for Houston's army. Houston negotiated a treaty, called the Cherokee Indian Treaty of February 23, 1836 (Treaty of Bowles Village with the Republic of Texas), for the tribe to obtain land between the Sabine and Neches Rivers. With the westward expansion of the United States, Native American tribes were pushed west. As president of the Republic of Texas, Houston developed policies to provide trading opportunities, safety, and peace for Native Americans. Throughout the last years of his presidency, Houston asserted the right of Native Americans to own land. In 1854, during his term as a senator from Texas, Houston helped negotiate for creation of the 1,280 acres (5.2 km^{2}) Alabama–Coushatta Indian Reservation. Houston became governor of Texas when the country was moving towards civil war. While those around him wanted Texas to separate from the Union, Houston believed that course would end badly for the South. Texas seceded from the Union and all the state government officials but Houston took an oath of loyalty to the Confederacy. As a result, he was removed from office. He was able, though, to get the Confederate States War Department to discharge all draftees from the Alabama-Coushatta tribe, who had distanced themselves completely from the conflict.

== Life with the Cherokees ==
=== Early life ===
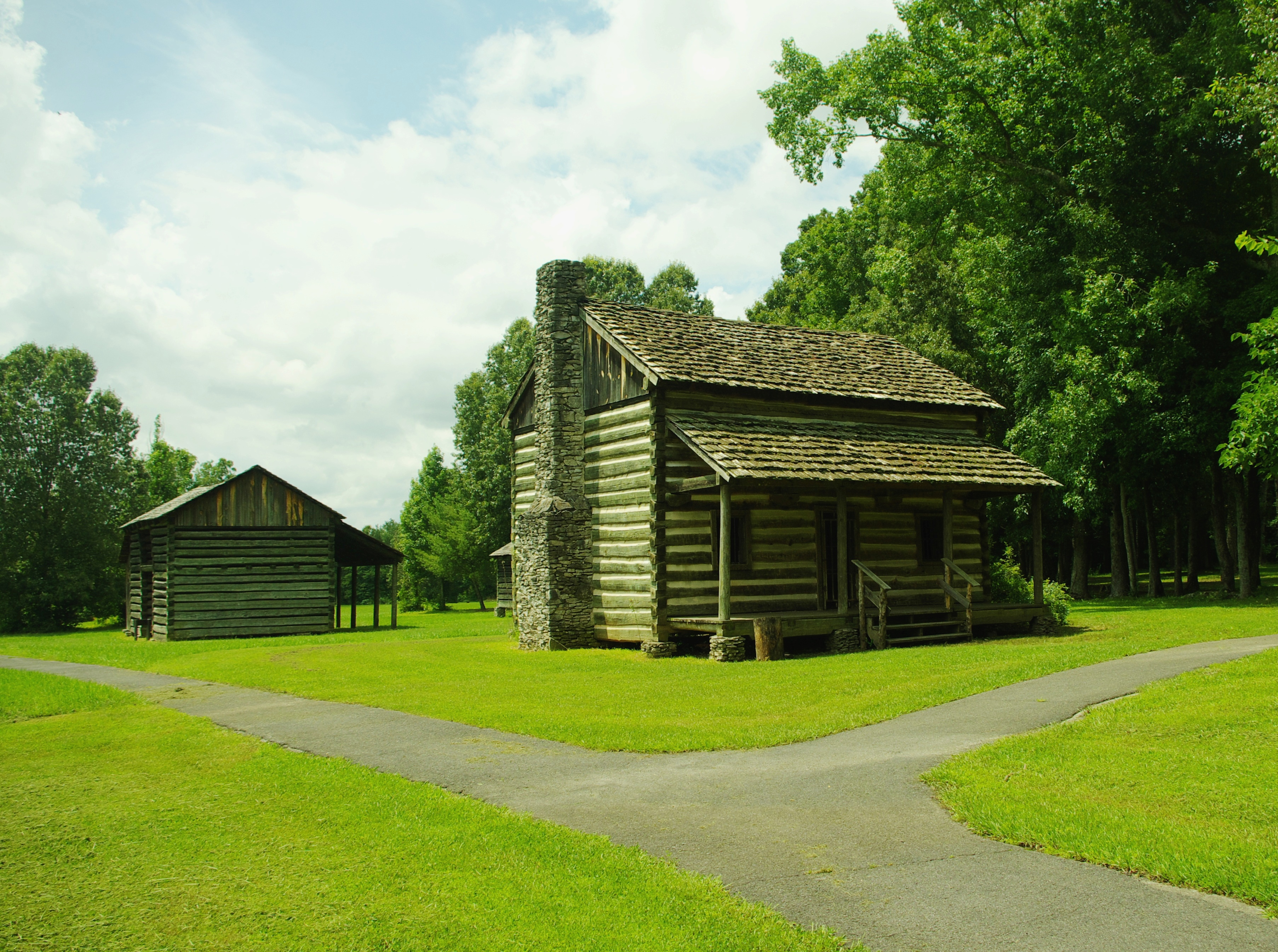
Reconstruction of an early 19th-century Cherokee farm in Tennessee

Sam Houston was born in Virginia. His father Samuel Davidson Houston, an American Revolutionary War veteran, died in 1806, when Houston was eleven. Two years later, his mother Elizabeth Blair Paxton Houston (1757–1831) moved the family of nine children to the wilderness of Blount County, Tennessee. They settled 10 miles (16 km) from Maryville on a 619 acres (2.51 km^{2}) tract along Baker's Creek (Note: Haley states that they had a 419-acre farm.) that his father purchased before his death. The Houstons cleared the land, built a cabin, and opened a store. He hated taking orders from his brothers, at the farm and the store. Bored by his chores, Houston retreated for hours into the woods, where he sometimes ran into Cherokee people, whom he found peaceful and friendly. The farm was near the Tennessee border with the Cherokee Nation, whose members often traded at the Houstons' store. The Cherokee were one of the Five Civilized Tribes.

Houston attended Porter Academy, Blount County's first school, (Note: The school is named for state representative James P.H. Porter who introduced a bill to allow for creation of schools. It was passed into law in 1806. Rev. Mark Moore taught at the academy that opened in 1808.) of which his two older brothers, James and John, were trustees. Houston disliked school. The only coursework that interested him was Latin, but the headmaster at the academy refused his request to be taught the language. Houston preferred reading books from his deceased father's library, especially the Greek classics, and other books that taught him about faraway lands and other historical periods.

According to Texas historian James L. Haley, Houston also preferred the "free and unsophisticated spiritual expression of the Native Americans" over the stern church sermons of damnation and hell. In 1809, he crossed the Tennessee River to live with the Cherokees along the banks of the Hiwassee River on Hiwassee Island, which was about 90 miles southwest of the Houstons' home. Sent to look for him, John and James found Houston at John Jolly's home. When his brothers asked him to return to the family, Houston told them that he preferred to live among the Cherokee people, which he did for three years. The tribe was led by Jolly (also known as Ahuludegi or Oolooteka), who emphasized the importance of fairness and honesty. The Indian agent of the Cherokee in southeastern Tennessee, Return J. Meigs, stated that Jolly's house was "one of the largest ... finest homes in the South." Houston considered Jolly his "Indian Father", and regarded the Cherokees as his family. Jolly adopted him and gave him the Cherokee name Colonneh, meaning "the Raven," which in Cherokee lore fights an evil spirit to save the Corn Spirit, thereby ensuring a bountiful harvest. Houston wore their clothing, spoke the Cherokee language, danced with them, and played their ball games. He hunted wild game with the Cherokee boys and wandered along woodland streams with the girls. According to William Carey Crane and James L. Haley, these experiences helped shape his character and gave him skills that aided him while serving in the military and as a leader.

Houston visited his family in Maryville occasionally, when his clothing needed mending or he needed money. While he was away from home, he corresponded with his cousins, inquiring after his younger brother William's welfare, and showing affectionate concern for his sisters. He acquired a reputation for drinking too much liquor and he purchased gifts for tribal members on credit, which created mounting debt. As a result, he took a job clerking at a store in Kingston, thirty miles west of Maryville. Houston returned to Maryville in 1812, and at 19 he opened a school in a one-room schoolhouse a few miles to the north. He charged tuition of eight dollars per term, payable in cash, cotton cloth, and corn. His venture was successful, and he later recalled that he "experienced a higher feeling of dignity and self-satisfaction than from any other office or honor which I have held." Finding himself again facing debts, in March, 1813, he enlisted in the United States Army. He was appointed a sergeant the same day. Houston fought in the Creek War where he led the charge against the Creek. He rose through the ranks and he developed what would be a life-long relationship with Andrew Jackson. He fought alongside the Cherokee during the War of 1812 at the Battle of Horseshoe Bend in 1814. Houston was badly hurt when an arrow was shot into his upper thigh. He was not expected to live through the night, but he recovered enough to return home. He was promoted to first lieutenant under Jackson in May 1817.

=== Resettlement to Arkansas Territory (1818) ===
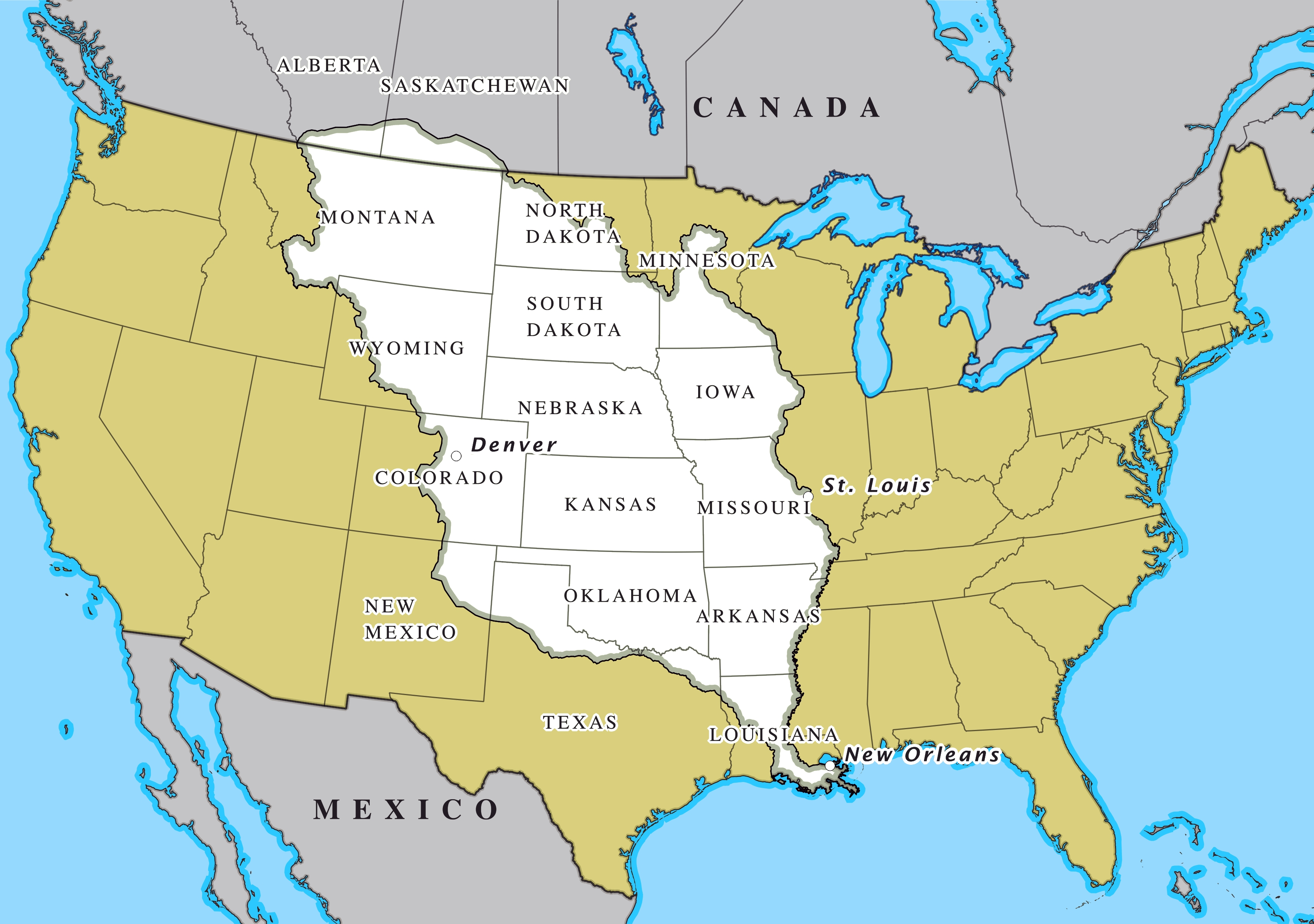
Louisiana Purchase (1803), map of present-day United States with an overlay of the Louisiana Purchase in white

As whites settled in the western frontier, political pressure mounted to remove Native Americans from the Southern United States to land west of the Mississippi River, as proposed in 1803 (the year of the Louisiana Purchase) by Thomas Jefferson. A delegation of Cherokee people visited the western lands in 1809. By 1816, Jackson wanted all Cherokee to move west and he thought that Houston could help make this happen. In 1817, after a treaty was negotiated with the Cherokee, Jackson appointed Houston as a sub-agent to administer the treaty because he could speak the Cherokee language and knew many of the people that were to be moved. Houston believed that the removal of Cherokee from East Tennessee was inevitable, and he felt that the Cherokee were moving to a place where they could live in peace. He was known among the Cherokee as the Great Chief of the whites.

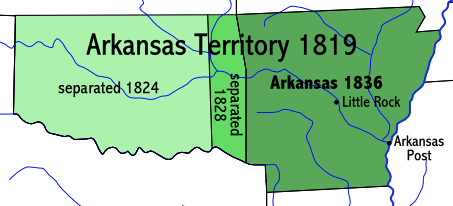
Arkansas Territory's evolution to the state of Arkansas and Indian Territory (present-day Oklahoma)

In February 1818, Houston was strongly reprimanded by Secretary of War John C. Calhoun after he wore Native American dress to a meeting between Calhoun and Cherokee leaders, beginning an enmity that lasted until Calhoun's death in 1850. Houston believed that the clothing he had worn showed respect for the Native American delegation, but Calhoun felt that it was unbecoming of an officer in the Army. Houston was also charged, and later cleared, of involvement in an illegal slavery ring. Angry over the incident with Calhoun and an investigation into his activities, Houston resigned from the army in 1818.

Houston continued to act as a government liaison with the Cherokee. The treaty he negotiated in 1818 stipulated that tribal members should get the same amount of land that they had in Tennessee. They were to have free navigation of the waterways, all head rights for their land, and receive money to make necessary improvements. Governor Joseph McMinn and Calhoun decided that it was important to ensure the success of the treaties and they bribed Tahlonteeskee, who received $1,000 (equivalent to $21,033 in 2025) while other delegates received $500 in bribes. It is unknown whether Houston was aware of the arrangement. Unlike the later Trail of Tears, there was no forced removal of the Cherokee. Their removal was well-organized, with much of the travel on river boats. Once they arrived, though, they learned that they had been given land that had been Osage and Quapaw hunting grounds.

=== Reunited in 1829 ===
==== Arrival ====
After receiving his law license and practicing law in Tennessee beginning in 1819, Houston was elected a congressman in 1823, chosen for the position by Jackson. In October 1827, he took the oath as the governor of Tennessee. In January 1829, Houston married Eliza Allen, the daughter of wealthy plantation owner John Allen of Gallatin, Tennessee; their marriage quickly fell apart, and in April 1829, Houston resigned as governor. Shortly after leaving office, he traveled west to rejoin the Cherokee, and reunited with Jolly's tribe in mid-1829.

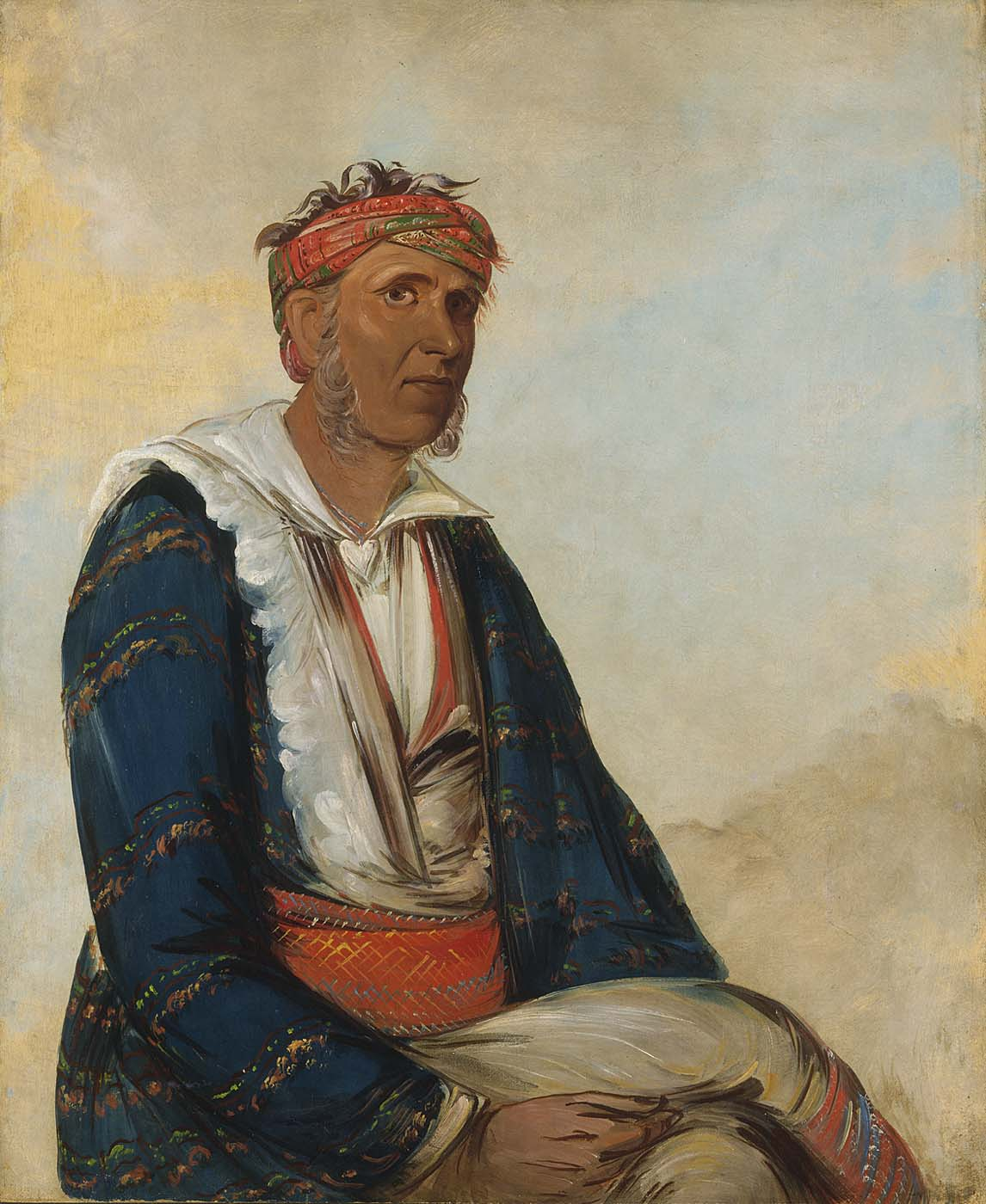
John Jolly, also known as Ahuludegi and Oolooteka, painted by George Catlin, 1834

After a calamitous journey, Houston disembarked from the steamboat into a clearing that was lit by torches carried by Jolly's slaves. The chief had been notified that Houston was on board and he came to meet him and take him two miles back to his home.

The old chief threw his arms around him and embraced him with great affection. He said,

My son, eleven winters have passed since we met. My heart has wandered often where you were; and I heard you were a great chief among your people. Since we parted at the Falls, as you went up the river, I have heard that a dark cloud had fallen on the white path you were walking, and when it fell in your way you turned your thoughts to the wigwam. I am glad of it—it was done by the Great Spirit… We are in trouble and the Great Spirit has sent you to give us council, and take trouble away from us. I will tell our sorrows to the great father, General Jackson. My wigwam is yours—my home is yours—my people are yours—rest with us.

— Charles Edwards Lester, The Life of Sam Houston

Seeking refuge from white society, Houston went to the lodge of Jolly to live among the people who gave him the happiest time of his life. In a letter dated May 11, 1829, to Jackson, he described himself as a man in "the darkest, direst hour of human misery" after his failed marriage. For his excessive drinking, he was nicknamed "Big Drunk".

==== Cherokee leaders ====
Jolly had a large plantation worked by up to twelve enslaved people, and he owned more than 500 head of cattle. Jolly was a generous host to whoever visited his large, fine house. (Note: While many Native American tribes ranged over land to hunt and gather food, Cherokees were among the first agrarians.) The wealthier members of the Cherokee Nation lived like southern planters; their labor was supplied by enslaved black people; they purchased fine goods from Baltimore, Philadelphia, or New Orleans, and they built homes like the fine Southern plantation houses. They did not approve, though, of the way that whites lived, and enjoyed their own cultural traditions. For instance, Houston and Jolly followed an ancient tradition among friends where they fed one another from a common spoon.

The leaders that Houston knew, such as Jolly, John Drew, Captain John Rogers, and Walter Webber were successful men who operated mercantile businesses or plantations, where cotton or corn crops were grown and harvested by African American enslaved people. Many of the leaders were partially of European descent, their fathers or fore-fathers being white traders who intermarried with the Cherokee people. According to Jack Dwain Gregory, they aimed to live like successful white people. Full-blooded Cherokees generally preferred to live according to Cherokee traditions.

==== Treaty of 1828 ====
More than ten years earlier, Houston had helped negotiate the treaty that brought the Cherokee to Arkansas, believing that they would not be subject to pressure from white Southerners to leave the area. He thought they would thus escape the continual encroachments by whites on their lands, but he had soon become very aware that the Cherokee were being taken advantage of by their own agents in the Arkansas country.

The treaty of 1828 (Treaty of Washington, May 6, 1828) required the Cherokee to move further west into Indian Territory, now Oklahoma. Although part of the arrangement was that the Indian agents were to give the Cherokee $50,000 (equivalent to $1,465,909 in 2025) in gold coin for abandoning their lands in Arkansas, they were given instead worthless certificates or paper money of little value. These agents also reduced the rations that the Cherokee were to have received. The Cherokee suspected that the federal government would move other Cherokee groups from the East onto their land, without increasing the amount of land they received, and they wanted good titles to their new lands.

==== Life among the Cherokee ====
On October 31, 1829, Houston was granted citizenship to live among the Cherokee with all the rights and responsibilities of native members of the tribe. (Note: Over the course of his life, Houston was a citizen of the United States, Cherokee Nation, Mexico, the Republic of Texas, and the Confederate States of America.) A committee, appointed by Jolly, assessed the contributions that he had made to the Cherokee, his integrity, as well as his proposals for the future, and they accepted him into the Cherokee Nation. The National Committee and Council approved him as well. Being a citizen of the Cherokee Nation gave him more cachet as a tribal emissary. (Note: Trading was not as easy as he expected, with native Cherokee questioning why he should have the right to trade, and some whites questioned it, too. He eventually became a U.S. citizen again under the Texas Admission Act.) He was also a Council leader. He was uniquely qualified to help them because he knew how the United States government operated, he spoke the Cherokee language and could interpret it, and he understood the needs of the Cherokee. Wanting to fully assimilate into the nation, he avoided white people, donned the clothing and turbans of the natives, wore a goatee and grew out his hair, which he braided and let fall down his back. He reportedly would not speak English, used an interpreter when he had to talk to white men, and carried no weapons but a bow and arrow, which he had learned to use as a boy. In 1829, Houston participated in a seven-day Green Corn Dance celebration that involved cleansing the wrongs committed in the past year by purging all traces of illness and foreign substances from the body, dancing, and games. He also participated in tribal governmental and religious functions at that time. Houston lived according to Cherokee customs and traditions, during which he better understood their perceptions of the world. He shared their appreciation for the land and its forests, and how they related to the natural world, unlike those white men who did not respect the Cherokee's connection with their homelands and hunting grounds. White men had deceived them, introduced devastating diseases, introduced white men's vices, and changed their way of life. Houston endeavored to work in their best interests and protect them.

Into 1831, Houston was often depressed and drunk. He physically attacked Jolly once when he was drunk and violent. He campaigned for a seat on the Cherokee tribal council, but was defeated. He had a shift in attitude after the death of his mother in September 1831 in Maryville, deciding that he needed to stop drinking and change his life path.

==== Marriage to Diana Rogers Gentry (1830–1832) ====
Houston married Diana Rogers Gentry under Cherokee law in the summer of 1830. Although separated from Eliza Allen, Houston was still legally married to her, but the Cherokee were not concerned about that. Diana was the daughter of Chief John "Hellfire" Rogers (1740–1833), a Scots-Irish trader, and Jennie Due (1764–1806), Jolly's sister. John Rogers had served as a captain in the British Army during the American Revolutionary War and fought under Jackson at the Battle of Horseshoe Bend in 1814, alongside his sons and Houston. He was the official interpreter for the Cherokee and the likely successor of Jolly as a leader of the Cherokee.

Diana was the name given to her at birth, but among the Cherokee she may have been known as Tiana. (Note: Her name was spelled a number of ways: Talhina, Titania, Tania, and more.) She was a tall, beautiful woman, of Scottish and English background, and less than a quarter Cherokee heritage. According to family lore, Diana attended a Moravian missionary school, perhaps Brainerd Mission. (Note: Diana's father was very interested in education for children. Her brother and sister were educated and it is very likely that Diana was, too. Diana signed legal documents with her mark (X), which was common among literate Cherokee who did not want to share their name on a white man's document.) Diana was previously married to David Gentry, a wealthy and powerful white man, in Tennessee. In 1817, the Gentrys moved to the Dardanelle area in Arkansas, where he was a successful blacksmith. They may have had two children, Joanna and Gabriel, neither of whom had children. It is also said that they had no children. David died during a battle with the Osage people.

Houston called Diana "Hina". They settled near Fort Gibson on the Neosho River and operated a trading post at Wigwam Neosho from 1829 to 1833. (Note: A historical marker was placed at the site on Highway 69 near Porter, Oklahoma, by the Oklahoma Historical Society in 1995. The site was previously visited by Washington Irving, who wrote the book A Tour on the Prairies.) After declining to accompany Houston to Texas in 1832, Diana remained in Indian Territory with titles to their property, which included their residence and land. The marriage ended without animus, and she later remarried. Diana died in 1838 of pneumonia. (Note: Will Rogers was her nephew, three generations removed.)

== Resettlement to Indian Territory (1830–1850) ==
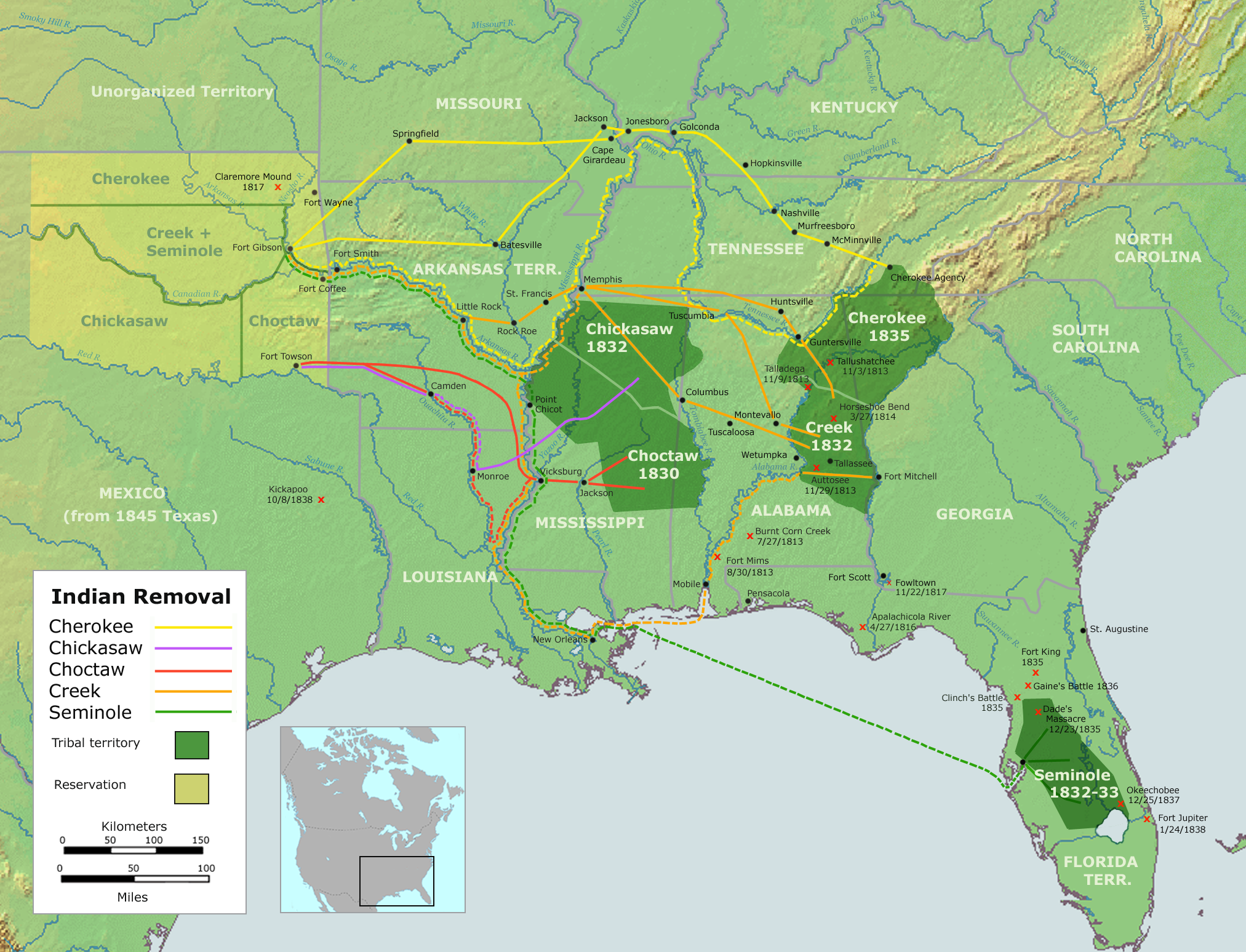
Map of the United States, showing the routes that Native Americans were driven from their homeland to the Indian Territory along what is called the Trail of Tears

Because of Houston's governmental experience and his connection with President Jackson, most of the local Native American tribes asked Houston to mediate disputes. It was a means to appeal to the Jackson administration more directly. In December 1829, Houston, while serving as an ambassador appointed by Jolly (Chief Oolooteka), and accompanied by a delegation of representatives of other Cherokee groups, went to Washington, D.C. He met with Jackson who subsequently removed corrupt Indian agents from their positions. He also ordered surveys of Cherokee lands so that good titles could be issued. In anticipation of the removal of the remaining Cherokee east of the Mississippi River, Houston made an unsuccessful bid to supply rations to the Native Americans during their journey.

On June 22, 1830, Houston wrote in an article that Native Americans "might indeed look to this, as a land of happiness and contentment. But until suitable Agents are sent to them, then can only regard this as the land of promises; where fraud will supplant faith, and injustice triumph over humanity". He expressed concern that the Cherokee would not find "peace or happiness" in the Indian Territory until they had honest and competent agents.

Houston gladly accepted a mission offered by Jackson to negotiate with the Comanche so that they would not attack the Native Americans that the government was moving westward. He crossed the border into Texas on December 2, 1832, and met with the Comanche in San Antonio; they agreed to meet in May 1833 with governmental officials at Fort Gibson.

In 1845, columnist and editor John L. O'Sullivan supported President James K Polk's expansion policy. He said that it was the United States's "manifest destiny to overspread and to possess the whole continent," thus coining the term manifest destiny.

== Texas Revolution (1835–1836) ==
Before the Texas Revolution, the Alabama–Coushatta Tribe were among Houston's allies. Earlier, they had crossed the Sabine River into what was then part of New Spain in 1780 and fought against the Spanish during the Mexican War of Independence. They were pivotal in the surrender near San Antonio on April 1, 1813 (Battle of Alazan Creek). (Note: The Alabama–Coushatta tribes were separate but very similar tribes who intermarried. They were part of the Creek Confederacy and spoke the Muskogean languages. They have a shared history and lived in Alabama before settling in southeast Texas in the Big Thicket.) In 1836, they provided provisions for people who passed through their villages in the Runaway Scrape, while fleeing Antonio López de Santa Anna's army. They were also guides for Houston's army. Houston negotiated a treaty for the tribes between the Sabine and Neches Rivers called the Cherokee Indian Treaty of February 23, 1836.

== Republic of Texas (1836–1838; 1841–1844) ==
=== First term, 1836–1838 ===
One of the tasks facing the new Republic of Texas was the need to establish a policy for Native American tribes. Houston, who assumed the office of president in 1836, planned to provide frontier protection, engage in trade relationships, and promote peace. On December 5, 1836, a law was enacted that gave Houston the power to protect Native Americans by establishing trading posts and blockhouses. Laws had also been enacted to establish a large army and a chain of forts, but Houston, having sympathy for the native peoples, would not execute these laws, because there were no funds to pay for them. He was able to provide riflemen and militia to protect the frontier. The law allowed for treaties, use of agents, and ability to distribute goods among Native American tribes.

Relations between whites and native peoples became increasingly problematic as Native Americans were pushed west and their land was usurped by whites. Houston was a strong believer in Native Americans' rights. Throughout the last years of his presidency, Houston made numerous efforts for the Republic to find common ground with the various tribes, asserting their right to land ownership. Many tribes thus came to respect him as their friend. For instance, various Native American tribes—sometimes hundreds of people at a time—camped out, ate, and celebrated at his farm. In 1836–1837, Houston enlisted the aid of the peaceful Texas Delaware tribe to guard the Texas border against angry Native Americans. When Mirabeau B. Lamar became president in 1838, his policies helped fuel the Texas–Indian wars. With John Forbes and John Cameron, Houston negotiated a treaty in East Texas with the Cherokee people (Treaty of Bowles Village with the Republic of Texas), in February 1836. Houston, Forbes, and Cameron were commissioners for the provisional government. The United States Congress would not ratify the treaty, and negotiations stalled. In early 1837, the Republic's government moved to a new capital, the city of Houston, named for Sam Houston, its first president.

In 1838, Houston frequently clashed with the United States Congress over issues such as a treaty with the Cherokee and establishment of a land-office act. He was forced to put down the Córdova Rebellion, a plot to allow Mexico to reclaim Texas with aid from the Kickapoo Indians. By keeping troops out of the Indian country, Houston avoided some serious conflicts with the native tribes. Nothing came of the threats made by the Cherokee after the Texas Senate refused to ratify the treaty granting them permanent title to their lands, and by the end of Houston's first term in December 1838, the native peoples of Texas had become agitated about continuing white encroachment on their lands.

In accordance with the Republic's constitution, Houston did not stand for re-election in the 1838 election. He was succeeded by Mirabeau B. Lamar, who, along with Burnet, led a faction of Texas politicians opposed to Houston. Lamar sought to exterminate hostile tribes, and he wanted friendlier tribes removed to reservations. In the case of the Alabamas and Coushattas, he sought to provide good titles to their lands, but they misunderstood the purpose of the surveyors who arrived on their land. Thinking that their land was going to go to white settlers, they moved out of the area. Before the situation could be rectified, whites began settling on the land. The Lamar administration removed many of Houston's appointees and established a new capital at Austin. Lamar raised volunteer troops and rangers to pacify the hostile tribes and launched a war against the Cherokee, this led to the Cherokee being driven from Texas by military force in 1839, and campaigns against the Comanche continued until the end of 1840.

Although Lamar's policy of punitive expeditions against the native peoples achieved its goal, Houston's policy of friendship and conciliation, even as they continued their raids on white settlements, had better results for the native peoples and was less costly in lives lost and funds expended by the Republic. Houston's defense of his Native American friends was the object of much newspaper commentary and was debated bitterly in the Texas Congress. The Republic of Texas constitution barred presidents from seeking a second consecutive term, so Lamar left office in 1841. Houston was again elected president.

=== Second term, 1841–1844 ===
When Houston left the presidency of Texas the first time, the Anglo population seemed to support Lamar's strong anti-Indian policies. After the Great Raid of 1840 and hundreds of lesser raids, with all of the captives either killed by the native peoples or recovered, and with the Republic bankrupt, Texans wanted to end the warfare and favored more diplomatic initiatives, which led to Houston's election to his second presidency.

Houston's Indian policy was to disband most of the regular Army troops, and to muster four new companies of rangers to patrol the frontier. Houston ordered the Texas Rangers to protect the lands of the Native Americans from encroachment by settlers and illegal traders. He wanted to end the cycle of rage and revenge that had spiraled out of control under Lamar. Under Houston's policies, the Texas Rangers were authorized to punish infractions by the native peoples, but they were never to initiate conflict. The troops were ordered to find and punish the actual perpetrators, rather than retaliating against innocent people simply because they were Native Americans.

Houston set out to negotiate with the Native tribes. The Caddo were the first to respond, and in August 1842, a treaty was made. Houston then expanded it to include all tribes except the Comanche, who still wanted permanent war. In March 1843, Houston reached an agreement with the Delaware, Wichitas, and some other tribes. At that point, Buffalo Hump (Potsʉnakwahipʉ), a war chief of the Penateka band of the Comanche who trusted Houston, began to talk. In August 1843, a temporary treaty accord led to a ceasefire between the Comanches and their allies, and the Texans, and on September 29, 1843, his administration negotiated the Treaty of Bird's Fort with the Delaware, Chickasaw, Waco, Tawakani, Keechi, Caddo, Anadahkah, Ionie, Biloxi, and Cherokee. In October 1843, the Comanche agreed to meet with Houston to negotiate a treaty similar to the one just concluded at Fort Bird. (Note: That this included Buffalo Hump, after the events at the Council House, showed the faith the Comanche had in Houston.) In early 1844, Amorous Man, Buffalo Hump, and Old Owl (Mopechucope), concluded the Treaty of Tehuacana Creek in which they agreed to surrender all white captives, and to cease raiding Texan settlements in exchange for the cessation of military action against them, the establishment of more trading posts, and formal recognition of the boundaries they chose for the Comanchería.

Comanche allies, including the Waco, Tawakoni, Kiowa, Kiowa Apache, and Wichita, also agreed to join in the treaty. The Texas Senate, before ratifying the treaty in its final form, removed the boundary that would have confined white settlers to the region east of the Edwards Plateau, causing Buffalo Hump to reject this altered version of the agreement, which led to a resumption of hostilities.

== U.S. Senator (1846–1859) ==
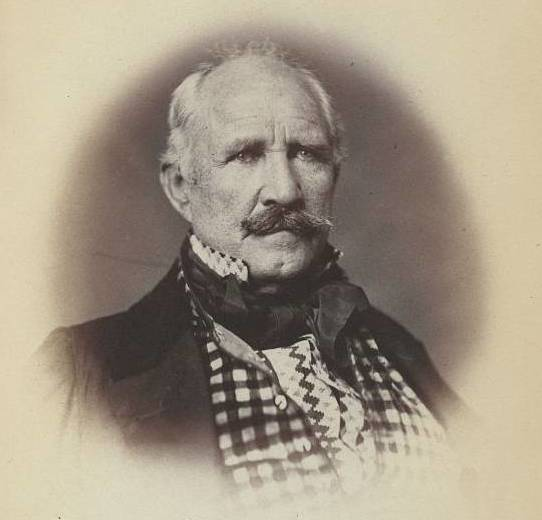
Half-length portrait of Sam Houston of the 35th United States Congress in Washington, D.C., 1859

In February 1846, the Texas legislature elected Houston as one of two inaugural U.S. senators from the state. Houston chose to align with the Democratic Party. In January, 1853, he was reelected to the Senate, and in November 1857, the Texas legislature chose John Hemphill to succeed him when his term was set to expire in March 1859. He remained a firm advocate of the rights of the Indians during the thirteen years he served, even though his cause was unpopular, and had antagonized many Texas citizens.

Houston was the only southern Democratic member of the U.S. Senate who voted against the Kansas-Nebraska bill introduced by Stephen A. Douglas of Illinois in 1854 to organize the Kansas and Nebraska Territories and effectively repeal the Missouri Compromise, allowing territorial residents to decide the slavery question for themselves. During a night session of the Congressional debates held before its passage, Houston made a closing address to the full galleries, asking a question not raised by anyone else. He wanted to know what provision would be made for the forty thousand Indians inhabiting the area in question, and pleaded their case, allowing that there was "little hope that any appeal I can make for the Indians will do any good." This was not the last time he detained the Senate to ask justice for "a race of people whom I am not ashamed to say have called me brother."

Also in 1854, Houston was instrumental in the state of Texas setting aside 1,280 acres for the Alabama-Coushatta Indian Reservation, in what is now Polk County, Texas. Since that time, the reservation has increased in size to 4,500 acres under the trusteeship of the state. On January 29 and 31 of 1855, Senator Houston made a speech in the U.S. Senate in defense of the Comanche and the other tribes of Texas. An excerpt:

I well remember in 1835, 1836, 1837 and 1838, in Texas, we had peace. The Comanches would come down to the very seaboard in amity and friendship, would repose confidently in our dwellings, would receive some trifling presents and would return home exulting, unless they were maltreated, or their chiefs received indignities. If they did receive such, they were sure to revisit that section of the country as soon as they went home and fall upon the innocent. For the years I have mentioned, in Texas, we had perfect peace, and, mark you, it did not cost the government over $10,000.00 a year. We had no standing army. A new administration came in and the Congress immediately appropriated $1,500,000.00 for the creation of two regular regiments. Those regiments were raised. What was the consequence? The policy had changed in the inauguration of the president. He announced the extermination of the Indians. He marshalled his forces. He made incursions on a friendly tribe who lived in sight of our settlements where the arts of peace were cultivated and pursued by them—by agriculture and other arts, and by exchange and traffic of such productions of the soil as were convenient. They lived by traffic with Nacogdoches. The declaration was made, and it was announced by the cabinet that they would kill off 'Houston's pet Indians'.

In early 1855, conflict along the entire Texas border had intensified. Native American war parties from north of the Red River crossed into the frontier regions of Texas and sometimes struck armed white settlements in the far south. They destroyed an entire German settlement near San Antonio in 1855, and Native raiders on horseback followed the Indian trail used by the Comanche war chief Buffalo Hump to the Gulf of Mexico. These disastrous strikes against the white settlers caused a political uproar, with the whites demanding that the Texas state government again muster rangers to fight the raiders. Houston lost his Senate seat because he opposed harsh reprisals against the Native peoples. Jefferson Davis, United States Secretary of War at the time, was determined to address the raiding, and hostile policies against Native Americans resumed.

== Houston's final years (1860-1863) ==
During Houston's final term as Governor of Texas, the Texas Secession Convention passed the Texas Ordinance of Secession on February 1, 1861, and Texas effectively became part of the Confederate States of America on March 1. Houston, like all other office holders in the state, was expected to take an oath of loyalty to the Confederacy. He refused and was removed from office by the Secession Convention on March 16; he was succeeded by Lieutenant Governor Edward Clark. In his final years, Houston's friends among the Alabama-Coushatta tribe visited his home. During this period, Houston managed to get the Confederate War Department to discharge all draftees from the Alabama-Coushatta tribe, which had distanced itself completely from the conflict.

== Legacy ==
The Cherokee Trail of Tears State Park, overlooking Hiwassee Island, was established to honor the relationship between Sam Houston and Native Americans who lived in Tennessee, Arkansas, and Oklahoma. It is located near Dayton, Tennessee, and the confluence of the Tennessee and Hiwassee Rivers.

Samuel Houston Mayes, named after his parents' friend, was the principal chief of the Cherokee Nation in Indian Territory (1895–1899).

== Bibliography ==
- Campbell, Randolph B. (2013). This Corner of Canaan: Essays on Texas in Honor of Randolph B. Campbell. University of North Texas Press. ISBN 978-1-57441-503-2.
- Chipman, Donald E.; Torgot, Andrew J.; Campbell, Randolph B. (2013). This Corner of Canaan: Essays on Texas in Honor of Randolph B. Campbell. University of North Texas Press. p. 91. ISBN 978-1-57441-503-2.
- Conley, Robert J. (2007). A Cherokee Encyclopedia. University of New Mexico Press. p. 191. ISBN 978-0-8263-3951-5.
- Cooper, William J. (December 22, 2010). Jefferson Davis, American. Knopf Doubleday Publishing Group. p. 277. ISBN 978-0-307-77264-0.
- Crane, William Carey (1884). Life and select literary remains of Sam Houston of Texas. Philadelphia: J. B. Lippincott & Co. LCCN 11016609. OCLC 1048334540.
- Everett, Dianna (1995). The Texas Cherokees: A People Between Two Fires, 1819-1840. University of Oklahoma Press. ISBN 978-0-8061-2720-0.
- Fehrenbach, T. R. (2003). Comanches: The History of a People. Anchor Books. ISBN 978-1-4000-3049-1.
- Flanagan, Sue (2010). Sam Houston's Texas. University of Texas Press. ISBN 978-0-292-78921-0.
- Friend, Llerena (2010). Sam Houston, the Great Designer. University of Texas Press. ISBN 978-0-292-78911-1.
- Gelo, Daniel J.; Wickham, Christopher J. (2018). Comanches and Germans on the Texas Frontier: The Ethnology of Heinrich Berghaus. Texas A&M University Press. ISBN 978-1-62349-594-7.
- Gregory, Jack Dwain (1996). Sam Houston with the Cherokees, 1829–1833. Norman, Oklahoma: University of Oklahoma Press. ISBN 978-0-8061-2809-2.
- Hale, Duane K. (1987). Peacemakers on the Frontier: A History of the Delaware Tribe of Western Oklahoma. Delaware Tribe of Western Oklahoma Press.
- Haley, James L. (2002). Sam Houston. Norman, Oklahoma: University of Oklahoma Press. ISBN 978-0-8061-3405-5.
- Haley, James L. (2004). Sam Houston. Norman, Oklahoma: University of Oklahoma Press. ISBN 978-0-8061-3644-8.
- James, Marquis (1929). The Raven: A Biography Of Sam Houston. Bobbs-Merrill.
- McClendon, R. Earl (1948). "The First Treaty of the Republic of Texas". The Southwestern Historical Quarterly. 52 (1): 32–48. ISSN 0038-478X. JSTOR 30237525.
- McCoy, Robert R.; Fountain, Steven M. (2017). History of American Indians: Exploring Diverse Roots. ABC-CLIO. ISBN 978-0-313-38683-1.
- Prucha, Francis Paul (1995). The Great Father: The United States Government and the American Indians. U of Nebraska Press. ISBN 978-0-8032-8734-1.
- Ramage, B. J. (1894). "Sam Houston and Texan Independence". The Sewanee Review. 2 (3): 309–321. ISSN 0037-3052. JSTOR 27527811.
- Rozelle, Ron (2017). Exiled: The Last Days of Sam Houston. Texas A&M University Press. ISBN 978-1-62349-587-9.
- Seale, William (1992) [1970]. Sam Houston's Wife: A Biography of Margaret Lea Houston. Norman, Oklahoma: University of Oklahoma Press. p. 17. ISBN 978-0-8061-2436-0.
- Spaw, Patsy McDonald (1990). "Senates of Republic First Congress, 1836–1837". The Texas Senate: Republic to Civil War, 1836-1861. Texas A&M University Press. ISBN 978-0-89096-442-2.
- Starr, Emmet (1922). History of the Cherokee Indians and Their Legends and Folk Lore. Warden Company. p. 222.
- Tiller, Veronica E. Velarde (1996). American Indian Reservations and Trust Areas. Economic Development Administration, U.S. Department of Commerce.
- Williams, John H. (1994) [1993]. Sam Houston: Life and Times of Liberator of Texas an Authentic American Hero. Simon & Schuster. ISBN 978-0-671-88071-2.
- Williams, John H. (2018). Sam Houston. New Word City. ISBN 978-1-64019-148-8.
- Wisehart, Marion Karl (1962). Sam Houston, American Giant. R.B. Luce.
- Woodward, Walter M. (2003). Sam Houston : for Texas and the Union. New York: PowerPlus Books. ISBN 978-1-61106-484-1. OCLC 1036846415.
