= Fearless, A Novel of Sarah Bowman =

1998 novel by Lucia St. Clair Robson

- Author: Lucia St. Clair Robson
- Language: English
- Genre: Historical novel, Western novel
- Publisher: Ballantine
- Publication date: 7 September 1999 (Hardback was released in 1998)
- Publication place: United States
- Media type: Print (hardback and paperback)
- Pages: 432 pages (paperback edition)
- ISBN: 0-345-39770-3 (Paperback edition)
- OCLC: 42403222

Fearless, A Novel of Sarah Bowman is a 1998 novel of historical fiction by Lucia St. Clair Robson.

The novel tells how Sarah Bowman arrived in Corpus Christi, Texas in 1845, to work as a laundress for the army that Zachary Taylor had assembled to invade Mexico in the Mexican–American War. Sarah Bowman was a historical figure and much of what is depicted in this novel is based on actual accounts of incidents. Sarah Bowman also makes an appearance later in life in another of Robson's novels, Ghost Warrior.

== Plot summary ==
In 1845, Mexico would not relinquish its claim to Texas, and the U.S. prepared for war. Under the command of General Zachary "Old Rough and Ready" Taylor, Sarah signed on as a laundress and cook and bivouacked with Taylor's army in Corpus Christi, preparing for an attack by Mexico. Before the war even began, though, her husband was killed. But going home was out of the question. She considered the army her home and its soldiers her family. Nowhere else would her courage and compassion be so much needed and appreciated.

While the battle raged around her, Sarah became a familiar figure through the haze of sulfurous blue smoke and the stench of exploding gunpowder, riding among the flames to retrieve the wounded. Through the long years of bitter battle, she would find love in the arms of a sergeant with eyes as golden as a flame, and friendship in the company of Cruz, a mexican woman whose personal history encompassed the war in all its passions and horrors.
