= Dianna Rogers =

Old Settler Cherokee woman

- Born: Dianna Rogers; 1790s Old Cherokee Nation, (now in Meigs County, Tennessee)
- Died: November 4, 1838 probably near Fort Gibson, Indian Territory
- Other names: Diana Rogers Gentry, Diana Gentry, Dianna Houston, Dianna McGrady, Diana Rogers, Dianna Rogers, Tahlihina Rogers, Talahina Rogers, Talhina Rogers, Talihena Rogers, Talihina Rogers, Tallahina Rogers, Tenia Rogers, Teeanna Rogers, Tiana Rogers, Titania Rogers, Tyania Rogers, and Tyenia Rogers.
- Occupations: Farmer, trading post operator
- Spouse: Sam Houston (m. 1830; ann. 1832)
- Children: 2
- Relatives: Elizabeth Emory (maternal grandmother); Susannah Emory (great-aunt); John Jolly (uncle); Chief John Rogers (half-brother and uncle); Chief William Charles Rogers (great aunt); Will Rogers (3 x great nephew)

Dianna Rogers (also known as Tiana or Talihina Rogers, 1790s – November 4, 1838) was an Old Settler Cherokee who emigrated from Tennessee to the Arkansas Territory in 1817. Her first husband was killed in the Osage wars with the Cherokee people. Forced to move further west in 1828 into what would become Indian Territory her extended family, which included John Rogers and John Jolly, lived in what is now the northeastern part of Oklahoma, along the Arkansas border. In 1829, she married Sam Houston and operated a trading post with him near Fort Gibson. She also tended their small farm and the slaves who assisted them. After Houston left for Texas in 1833, Dianna remarried. She left no living children. Many myths and fanciful stories have been told of her and Houston's relationship, their meeting, and eventual parting, but very little is actually known. A body purported to be hers, but disputed by several historians, was exhumed and buried at the Fort Gibson National Cemetery in 1904. The tombstone bears the name Talahina, which according to legal documents and historians' analysis was never her name.

== Early life and education ==
Dianna Rogers, (Note: Legal documents prepared by Sam Houston listed her name as Diana Gentry. In a bill of sale for a slave Peter, dated in 1834, her brother Joseph Rogers called her his "Sister Dianna Houston formerly Dianna Rogers". Documents she drafted in 1836 to sell Peter to her husband said "Dianna McGrady late Dianna Houston". Jack Gregory and Rennard Strickland, who William Seale credited with writing a "scholarly account" of Dianna's life, said official documents of the War Department and Bureau of Indian Affairs call her either Diana or Dianna, and family tradition states her name was chosen in honor of the Greek goddess, Diana. Gregory and Strickland said further that as Cherokee people had difficulty in "pronouncing the d in Diana", writers and historians wrote what they thought they heard, which accounts for the numerous spellings of her name. They concur with Oklahoma historian Grant Foreman, that although Talihina or Talahina are popularly used to refer to Rogers, and the latter appears on her tombstone, the word is not Cherokee, but Choctaw.) was likely born in the 1790s, (Note: One of the first works to give Dianna an age was Marquis James in his Pulitzer Prize-winning book, The Raven: A Biography of Sam Houston (1929), where he states that she was about thirty when she and Houston met in 1829 in Indian Territory. Writer James L. Haley placed her in her middle thirties at that time. Neither cites a source for the approximation. Historian William Seale stated, Dianna was "some years his [Houston's] senior". Houston was born in 1793. Shorey Ross stated she was in her forties when she died in 1838.) in the Cherokee Country (now Meigs County, Tennessee) to Jennie (née Due) and John Rogers, known as Hell-Fire Jack. She was one-sixteenth Cherokee. According to Cherokee historian and physician Emmet Starr, her mother was the daughter of Elizabeth Emory and Robert Due (or Dews). (Note: Elizabeth was one-quarter Cherokee, descending from Mary Grant (wife of William Emory), and Eughioote of the Long Hair Clan (also known as Elizabeth Coody or Elizabeth Tassel and the wife of Ludovick Grant.) Elizabeth's second husband was Hell-Fire Jack, with whom she had five children. Sororal polygamy (or polygyny) was common among the Cherokee, but discouraged by the Moravian missionaries who worked among them and who were shocked that Dianna's mother and grandmother were both married to the same man. Her father was born around 1749, and was of Scottish, or English heritage. He served as a British captain in the American Revolution. He worked as a trader in Indian country, for the Muscogee people and then lived among the Cherokee for thirty years before moving to Arkansas. He operated a ferry on the Clinch River in Tennessee and had a large plantation where he grew corn and cotton with slave laborers.

Dianna grew up in a large family. Her half-brothers and uncles were Charles (b. ca. 1774), John Jr. (1779–1846), and James. Her half-sisters and aunts were Aky and Nanny. Her full siblings were Annie, Joseph (d. 1834–1836), William, and Susannah. Dianna was the penultimate sibling. She signed documents with an "X", as was customary among Cherokees rather than a sign of illiteracy. Even Sequoyah refused to affix his Cherokee signature "to a white man's document". Although Jennings C. Wise, stated that Dianna was "mission-educated", and historians Jack Gregory and Rennard Strickland stated that family tradition held that she was educated at a Moravian mission school in Tennessee, "perhaps at Brainerd", Brainerd Mission was not founded until 1817. The records of Springplace Mission, located near James Vann's plantation at what is now Spring Place, Georgia and founded in 1800, make numerous mentions of Dianna's father, but state that Rogers' children in 1807 were attending the school of Mr. Blacke, near their home. Prior to that, Rogers had employed George Barbee Davis, who also tutored John Ross, to tutor his children at home.

Hell-Fire Jack's property was located on Roger's Creek, at the confluence of the Hiwassee and Tennessee Rivers, a few miles from Hiwassee Island, where John Jolly lived. (Note: John Jolly has been described as Dianna's uncle, and historian John Bartlett Meserve stated he was a brother of Jennie Due and a brother-in-law to her father, Hell-Fire Jack, as did Marquis James. This would mean that one of Jennie's parents was also the parent of Jolly, but Starr does not list Jolly as one of Elizabeth Emory's children.) Jolly had adopted young Sam Houston in 1809 when he ran away from his home near Maryville, Tennessee and crossed the river to live with the Cherokee community on Hiwassee Island. There is little doubt, per Gregory and Strickland, that Dianna knew Houston as he lived with her uncle, and he became close friends with her brothers John and James. Her brothers and uncles served in the Creek War, participating in the Battle of Horseshoe Bend during the War of 1812 with Houston. Some sources claim that Houston and Dianna fell in love during his time with Jolly, while other stories tell that Dianna lived with Jolly as a child and Houston helped her with her lessons. Gregory and Strickland found no evidence of the nature of any relationship between Dianna and Houston in Tennessee. After three years, Houston returned to Maryville in 1812.

== Married life ==
Dianna married David Gentry, a blacksmith, whose first wife was her mother's sister, Mary Due. Gentry's father was likely Nathaniel Gentry of Spartanburg and Greenville Counties in South Carolina. Newlyweds David Gentry and Mary Due are found in the 1800 census of Greenville County, South Carolina. (Note: Starr's 1921 book, History of the Cherokee Indians and Their Legends and Folk Lore shows the two daughters of Elizabeth Emory and Robert Due to be Jennie Due and Mary Buffington. This is a typographical error, as his numbering system indicates they are both the daughters of Robert Due. David Keith Hampton and Jack D. Baker evaluated Starr's original notes and issued an edited version published in three volumes in 1987 as Old Cherokee Families: Notes of Dr. Emmet Starr. In their version, the corrected name shows Mary Due on page 1 of volume 3.) Dianna and David had two children, Gabriel and Joanna Gentry, who were half-siblings and nephew and niece to Mary Due's children, Elizabeth, Isabel, and Patience. In 1817, her father led a group of thirty-one Cherokees to what would become the Arkansas Territory. Dianna and David settled around Dardanelle, where David's business thrived. Their goal in moving was to avoid the White encroachment on their lands and evade attempts to force the Cherokee to assimilate to White culture. From the time of the Cherokee arrival in Arkansas, skirmishes began with the Osage Nation, who viewed the Cherokees as intruders on their lands. War between the two peoples continued through the 1830s. In 1825, the United States entered into a treaty with the Osage Nation, who agreed to cede land that established the western boundary of Arkansas as the 100th meridian. Thereafter, the policy of the United States was to relocate Native people to these lands west of any organized territory or state. A treaty with the Cherokee living in the west was agreed in 1828, providing that the lands in Arkansas Territory be given up in favor of a permanent home to the west in what would later become Indian Territory. In exchange for them leaving Arkansas Territory, the tribe was granted seven million acres of land, indemnification of losses to relocate, food to tide them over until a new crop and harvest could be realized, and a formal delineation of their promised land.

Dianna and David moved west and lived near Frog Bayou, which is now in Crawford County, Arkansas, near Mountainburg. Her extended family lived in scattered settlements within a fifty-mile radius of Fort Smith. The family members visited each other often, according to council minutes, store records, and letters. At some point after moving to Frog Bayou, but before 1829, David was killed in the Osage wars. Both of her children with David died without marrying or having children. In July 1829, Houston came back into her life. He had married Eliza Allen in January, while serving as Governor of Tennessee, but the couple separated within three months. No explanation for their separation was ever given, but Houston resigned his governorship and headed to the western Cherokee country, where his friend Jolly was living. Jolly's home was located on a bluff overlooking the confluence of the Arkansas River and Illinois Rivers at Tahlonteeskee, near present-day Gore, Oklahoma, and about thirty miles south of Fort Gibson. Many fanciful stories tell of Houston and Dianna's meeting. Gregory and Strickland state "perhaps the most reliable [account] is found in Williams". Alfred M. Williams published "General Houston's Indian Life" in 1883, at a time when there were still people living who knew Jolly and Houston. Williams stated that regular stickball games were held in the field behind the council house at Tahlonteeskee, followed by a night of dancing; at one of these events, Dianna and Houston began their relationship.

They moved in together at a cabin Houston built on the opposite bank of the Grand River from Fort Gibson. Rogers' family tradition holds that the couple were married in a civil service at the home of Captain John Rogers, (Note: Captain Rogers referred to both Dianna's father and her brother. In 1818, Joseph McMinn wrote, that Captain Rogers was a white man who had lived more than forty years among the Cherokee. Senate Documents from 1844 state, "William Rogers, subsequently chosen to fill a vacancy was one of the signers of that act [the 1840 act of union between the eastern and western Cherokee factions], and brother of Captain John Rogers, the ex-chief". Hoig states that John Rogers, born in 1749, no longer appears in the records of the Cherokee Agency after 1819. A letter from John, born in 1749, who was acting as agent for the Cherokee in Arkansas, to Andrew Jackson, written in June 1820 from Spadru Bayou, Arkansas, stated that John's health had improved. John Jr. was hired by the War Department in 1828 to encourage emigration of the Cherokees in the east and served as an interpreter through 1831. There was another Captain John Rogers (1780–1860) living in the area, who was born in Pennsylvania and founded Fort Smith.) on Spavinaw Creek (now in Mayes County, Oklahoma) in 1830. Historian Grant Foreman stated he had never been able to find a record of their marriage, but that their relationship was sanctioned by the tribe. Cherokee law, which required an official service for marriage to a White man, would not likely have applied to Houston. He had been formally granted Cherokee citizenship by adoption of a resolution by the Cherokee Council on October 21, 1829. Founding a home together was all that was required to establish a common law marriage for the Cherokee. That Houston was still married to Eliza Allen, and would not divorce her until 1833, was of no consequence, as Cherokee law accepted that when a couple no longer resided together they were divorced. Regardless of how their union came to be, the couple were recognized by the tribe and family as husband and wife, and Dianna drew up legal documents reflecting her name as Dianna Houston.

They called their home Wigwam Neosho, lived in a small log cabin, and had a small herd of cattle, a garden, and planted a pear orchard. Dianna supervised the farming operations and the slaves, also helping run the trading post. Wigwam Neosho was located on the Texas Road and Houston ran a trading post there, taking advantage of the numerous caravans of settlers passing. Gregory and Strickland recognized that life with Houston must have been a significant change from the aristocratic setting of her youth. Both her father and Jolly lived in mansions, described as "almost palaces...with large porticos and yards tended by slaves". Houston's home was a one-room, rough-hewn cabin and Fort Gibson, they said, was not a place that someone with Dianna's background would likely have visited. The Fort was called the "Hellhole of the Southwest" and frequented by adventurers, soldiers and gamblers who played poker nightly and drank heavily. Her family had been known as gracious hosts who threw lavish celebrations. Gregory and Strickland said that entertaining the rough traders, stray soldiers, gamblers, and Native people who visited them and were rowdy and drunk, would have been trying for "any well-bred woman", and "must have been offensive" to Dianna. On the other hand, they also entertained figures like Matthew Arbuckle Jr., Auguste Pierre Chouteau, and Washington Irving, among others, and she may have traveled with Houston when he was on official business.

Houston often drank whiskey at nearby Fort Gibson and increasingly returned home in a state of drunkenness. Williams reported that Houston sought the "stupification" that liquor provided so that he did not have to dwell on his regret and failures. Despite this, when asked to accompany Cherokee leaders to Washington, D.C. to present their grievances, Houston sobered up. The delegation left in December 1831 and arrived in Washington in early 1832. Houston was accused of profiting from his relationship with the Cherokee and a court case ensued, which he won. Andrew Jackson, who at that time was president, then sent Houston as an envoy to the Comanche people of Texas. Houston did not return to the Cherokee until May 1833. On June 27, he drafted a power of attorney to represent Dianna in her claims for property lost in the removal from Arkansas, but was back in Texas by July. Many legends exist about Dianna and Houston's parting – she died in his arms; she threw herself off a cliff; she died in the Choctaw Nation and the town of Talihina was named after her; and she accompanied Houston to Wilson's Rock, (near present day Muldrow, Oklahoma), where they parted ways. Williams gives no information about their parting, but stated that after Houston had established himself in Texas, he sent for Dianna. She refused to join him, preferring to remain with her family. On April 1, 1836, Dianna married Samuel D. McGrady. McGrady was a whiskey runner, who operated between Fort Gibson and Fort Smith. Whether she remained married to McGrady, remained at Wigwan Neosho, or left the area are unknown, according to Gregory and Strickland.

== Death and legacy ==
Dianna died on November 4, 1838, from pneumonia, and her burial site remains unknown. Williams stated she died at the cabin she had shared with Houston, while Starr said she died at her home in Rex, (now Okay in Wagoner County, Oklahoma). Newspaper publisher, J. S. Holden of the Fort Gibson Post, was told around 1894 by a former Confederate soldier named George Williamson from Fort Smith that he recalled seeing Houston's wife's grave at Wilson's Rock in 1863, when he was returning from the Battle of Pea Ridge. An Old Settler Cherokee named William Wilson also claimed to have seen the grave in 1895. This information was supposedly confirmed by John Gunter of Muldrow, who said his sister was living with "Talihina" when she died and "Talihina" was buried at the mouth of Skin Bayou near Wilson's Rock. Professor Stan Hoig stated there was no evidence that Dianna ever lived at Wilson's Rock or near Skin Bayou and he believed another Tiana Roger's story was confused with Dianna's. (Note: Hoig pointed out that there was a woman named Tiana Rogers, who lived in the Cherokee Nation in Indian Territory. This Tiana or Tyana Rodgers (née Foster) moved west in 1839 and settled in Skin Bayou. Her husband, Little John Rogers emigrated from Georgia in 1833 and around 1845 moved back to Georgia. Tiana submitted a claim in 1845 under the terms of the 1828 Treaty of Washington, and was known to have moved to Chetopa, Kansas, by 1847 where she raised three daughters and four sons.)

In May 1904, Williamson, Wilson, and Holden located the grave marked with a sandstone near a red cedar tree. Holden petitioned the War Department to allow Dianna's body to be buried in the officer's circle at the Fort Gibson National Cemetery, and was given permission by the army. He ran a subscription campaign to raise funds for re-burying "Talahina". Holden and O. H. Farley, a Muskogee undertaker, exhumed a body from Skin Bayou, near Wilson's Rock on the Arkansas River. The woman's remains were reburied after a well-attended ceremony at the National Cemetery in Fort Gibson on September 4, 1904, with a marker reading "No. 2467, Talihina Houston". Cherokee historian Emmet Starr and Shorey Ross, a descendant of John Ross, believed Holden had made a significant error. Ross thought Houston's wife was buried near Fort Gibson and Starr said that the remains disinterred by Holden belonged to a woman named Coody. W. P. Campbell, editor of the Oklahoma Historical Society journal, Historia, wrote that Dianna was buried near the mouth of Fourteen Mile Creek, (now in Cherokee County). In 1907, a marble pillar with just the name "Talihina Houston" was erected, but was later replaced with a stone which reads "Talahina R. wife of Gen. Sam Houston".

Many myths, legends and romanticized accounts of her life exist. Writer Paul Williams, in his book Jackson, Crockett and Houston on the American Frontier, made the claim that Dianna and Houston had a child, Margaret Lewis Head Houston, in 1830. No other source states that they had any children. A. M. Williams, who interviewed people who were contemporaries of and knew Houston and Jolly, stated that Houston had no Native children. Another story is that Dianna was a step-daughter to The Bowl, also known as Di'wali or John Bowles. This speculation stems from a supposition that his first wife, listed as simply "Jenny" by Starr, was Jennie Due and that they married after the death of Hell-Fire Jack. The Bowl and his followers left their home on Petit Jean Creek (now in Conway County, Arkansas) in 1819 and they temporarily camped at a spot near Lost Prairie on the banks of the Red River (now in Miller County, Arkansas). Over the winter of 1819–1820, he and sixty followers moved into Spanish Texas, settling close to the Caddo people, near what is now Nacogdoches, Texas. As of June 1820, Hell-Fire Jack was still living in Arkansas with his family. The Bowl remained in Texas, where he died in 1839. Dianna Everett, editor of the Encyclopedia of Oklahoma History and Culture, called this story "possible though perhaps barely probable".

Through the 1960s, historians deleted Dianna's existence from Houston's life. When Houston's third wife, Margaret Lea Houston selected William Carey Crane to write a biography of Houston, he wrote frankly about Houston's hard-drinking, but made no mention of Dianna. Houston's son Andrew sued a Hollywood film company for mention of Dianna in a film about Houston. Another son, William Houston came to Oklahoma from Dallas in 1919, and after visiting places his father had lived with Dianna, declared that he recognized them as husband and wife. Gregory and Strickland stated in 1967, that when they were collecting material to write about Houston's life with the Cherokee, they were "warned" against writing about an "Indian wife". Some people refused to cooperate with their research and some discussions escalated to threats of "physical violence". In 1985, Walk in My Soul, a historical novel written by Lucia St. Clair Robson, was published. The book tells the story of the Cherokee removal from the east interwoven with a love story between "Tiana" and Houston. The made-for-television movie Gone to Texas, released in 1986, was a biographical film on the life of Houston from his time as governor of Tennessee to leading the movement for Texas' independence from Mexico. Devon Ericson was cast in the role of "Tiana".
