= María Josefa Zozaya =

Mexican army supporter (1822–1846)

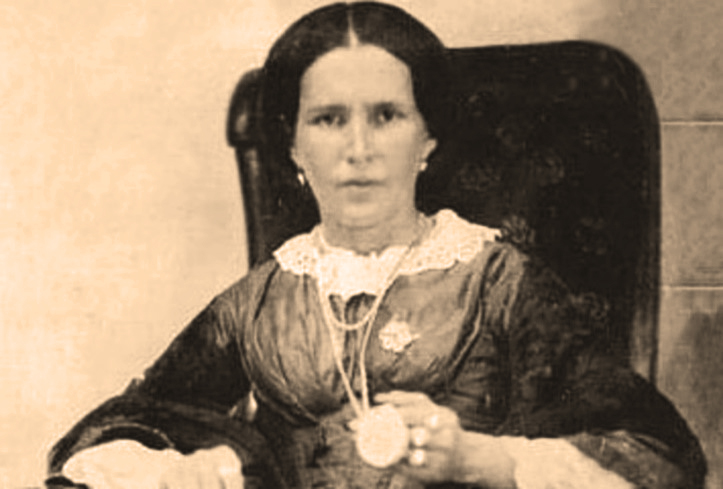
- Known for: Treating soldiers during the Mexican–American War

María Josefa Zozaya de Garza (c. 1822 – September 23, 1846) was a Mexican woman who aided wounded and ill troops of both the American and Mexican armies during the Mexican–American War. She was shot and killed by a stray bullet at the Battle of Monterrey while tending to a wounded soldier. After her death, she became known as the "Heroine Martyr of Monterrey".

== Biography ==
María Josefa Zozaya was born in about 1822 in the municipality of San Carlos to Cristóbal de Zozaya and Gertrudis Vladez. Sometime before 1846, she moved with her family to Monterrey. She was present in the city upon the arrival of American soldiers under General Zachary Taylor. During the Battle of Monterrey, she brought food and water to the exhausted troops on both sides of the fighting at great personal risk. While tending to a wounded American soldier, she was struck by a bullet, killing her. She was buried by the American soldiers she had helped.

There is some discrepancy regarding the date of her death. Some sources cite her death being in 1860 in Matamoros, Tamaulipas. She is alleged to have married a Mexican man called Manuel de la Garza y Flores, who died two years after their marriage in 1847.

There is a library named for her, La Biblioteca Pública Municipal María Josefa Zozaya de Garza, located in Sabinas Hidalgo, Nuevo León. There is also a primary school which bears her name, El Colegio Josefa Zozaya, in San Nicolás de los Garza.

== See also ==
- Women in the Mexican–American War
