= Walk in My Soul =

1985 novel by Lucia St. Clair Robson

- First edition
- Author: Lucia St. Clair Robson
- Language: English
- Genre: Historical novel, Western novel
- Publisher: Ballantine
- Publication date: 12 May 1985
- Publication place: United States
- Media type: Print (Paperback)
- Pages: 656 pages (Paperback edition)
- ISBN: 0-345-34701-3 (Paperback edition)
- OCLC: 17208520

Walk in My Soul is a 1985 historical novel by Lucia St. Clair Robson.

== Plot summary ==
Walk in My Soul is the story of Tiana Rogers of the Cherokee, the young Sam Houston, and the Trail of Tears.

Tiana grew up learning the magic, spells, and nature religion of the Cherokee. In a tribe that revered the life force that was female, she became a beloved woman—priestess, healer, and teacher.

Known as the "father of Texas", the young Sam Houston ran away on a lark from his family's general store in Maryville, Tennessee, to live among the Cherokee. He hunted and played ritual games with the men and was adopted as a headman's son and was known as "Raven".

Houston falls in love with Tiana, but due to their differing racial and cultural backgrounds, conflict ensues.

== Reviews ==
Kenneth Estes Hall stated that the book contained significant background information about Cherokee culture and effectively used that information to advance the narrative and build upon its tragedy. He praised her character balanced development saying that the strength portrayed by her protagonist, Tiana, was enhanced by the strong characterization of Houston. Hall said the book is a study of cross-cultural influences, as Tiana was of Scottish and Cherokee heritage, Houston was a White man who had been adopted by the Cherokee, and Fancy and Coffee, an African-American couple, were developed to explore racism in the era.
