= Light a Distant Fire =

1988 novel by Lucia St. Clair Robson

- Paperback cover
- Author: Lucia St. Clair Robson
- Language: English
- Genre: Historical novel
- Publisher: Ballantine Books
- Publication date: September 1998
- Publication place: United States
- Media type: Print (Paperback)
- Pages: 432 pp (paperback edition)
- ISBN: 0-345-32548-6 (paperback edition)
- OCLC: 18419292
- Dewey Decimal: 813/.54 20
- LC Class: PS3568.O3185 L54 1988

Light a Distant Fire is a 1988 historical novel by Lucia St. Clair Robson that fictionalizes the story of the Second Seminole War, Andrew Jackson, and the charismatic leader Osceola, warchief of the Seminole tribe.
