= The Tokaido Road (novel) =

1991 novel by Lucia St. Clair Robson

- Author: Lucia St. Clair Robson
- Language: English
- Genre: Historical novel
- Publisher: Ballantine Books
- Publication date: 1991
- Publication place: United States
- Media type: Print (Hardback & Paperback)
- Pages: 513 pp (first edition, hardback)
- ISBN: 0-345-37026-0 (first edition, hardback)
- OCLC: 22277876
- Dewey Decimal: 813/.54 20
- LC Class: PS3568.O3185 T65 1991

The Tokaido Road is a 1991 historical novel by Lucia St. Clair Robson. Set in 1702, it is a fictional account of the famous Japanese revenge story of the Forty-Seven Ronin. In feudal Japan, the Tōkaidō (meaning "Eastern Sea Road") was the main road, which ran between the imperial capital of Kyoto (where the Emperor lived), and the administrative capital of Edo (now Tokyo where the shōgun lived).
