= Ride the Wind =

Novel by Lucia St. Clair Robson

- First edition
- Author: Lucia St. Clair Robson
- Language: English
- Genre: Historical novel, Western novel
- Publisher: Ballantine
- Publication date: 1982
- Publication place: United States
- Media type: Print (Hardback & Paperback)
- Pages: 608 pp (Paperback edition)
- ISBN: 0-345-32522-2 (Paperback edition)
- OCLC: 13028074

Ride the Wind is a 1982 Western novel by American author Lucia St. Clair Robson. It tells the story of Cynthia Ann Parker's life after she was kidnapped by Comanche Indians in 1836, when she was nine years old, during a raid on her family's fort. This is the story of how she grew up with them, mastered their ways, married one of their leaders, and became a Comanche woman. Her son Quanah Parker was the last Comanche leader to surrender to the United States Army. It is also an account of a people who were happiest when they were moving, and a depiction of a way of life that is gone forever.

Ride the Wind earned the Western Writers of America's Golden Spur Award for Best Novel of the West in 1982. It also made the New York Times and Washington Post best-seller lists that year. In its 26th printing, it is still popular today.

Ride the Wind was voted one of 100 Western Classics for the century by 100 Years of Western Classics as selected by American Western Magazine's readers in 2000.
