= Gone to Texas (film) =

1986 film

- Genre: Biography; Drama; History
- Written by: Frank Q. Dobbs; John Binder
- Directed by: Peter Levin
- Starring: Sam Elliott
- Music by: Dennis McCarthy
- Country of origin: United States
- Original language: English

Production
- Executive producer: J.D. Feigelson
- Producer: Frank Q. Dobbs
- Production locations: Laredo, Texas; Alamo Village - Highway 674, Brackettville, Texas; Sam Houston Park - 1100 Bagby Street, Houston, Texas; Winedale Historical Farm - FM 2714, Round Top, Texas
- Cinematography: Frank Watts
- Editors: Mike Eliot; Paula Sanburn
- Running time: 144 minutes
- Production companies: Friedgen Productions; J.D. Feigelson Productions; TAFT Entertainment Pictures

Original release
- Network: CBS
- Release: November 22, 1986

Gone to Texas is a 1986 American made-for-television biographical film originally titled Houston: The Legend of Texas. It stars Sam Elliott in the title role, and is a biopic of Sam Houston's years as Governor of Tennessee through his involvement in the Texas Revolution.

This production is notable for the complete absence of Davy Crockett in the Battle of the Alamo scenes.

== Cast ==
- Sam Elliott as General Sam Houston
- Claudia Christian as Eliza Allen
- Devon Ericson as Tiana Rogers
- Ned Romero as Cherokee Chief John Jolly
- Ivy Pryce as Erastus "Deaf" Smith
- William Russ as Lieutenant Colonel Bill Travis
- John P. Ryan as President David G. Burnet, President of The Republic of Texas
- Michael Beck as Colonel Jim Bowie
- Bo Hopkins as Colonel Sidney Sherman
- James Stephens as Stephen F. Austin
- Richard Yniguez as General Antonio López de Santa Anna
- Peter Gonzales Falcon as Captain Juan Seguín
- Michael C. Gwynne as Captain Moseley Baker
- Donald Moffat as Colonel John Allen
- John Quade as Senator William Stansbury
- Ritch Brinkley as Senator Buckley
- G.D. Spradlin as President Andrew Jackson
- John de Lancie as John Van Fossen
- Javier Grajeda as Mexican Lawyer
- Robert F. Hoy as Colonel Burleson
- Cynthia Cuprill as Emily
- Blue Deckert as Thomas Rusk
- Ambrosio Guerra as General Martín Perfecto de Cos
- Jerry Haynes as Uncle Jimmy
- Brad Leland as Sergeant Quinn
- John B. Wells as Kuykendall
- Dennis Letts as Captain Ross
- Joe Morales as Captain Olivera
- Dave Tanner as George Washington Hockley
- Luis Munoz as Mexican Judge
- David Peña as Colonel Almonte
- John Nixon as Joe
- Jerry Biggs as The Messenger
- J.D. Feigelson as Military Officer At Wedding Ball
- Andy Stahl as Robinson
- Kevin R. Young as Captain Coleman
- Jimmy Ray Pickens as Taylor
- Roger Ragland as Texan Patriot (uncredited)
- Bill Chemerka as Executed Texan (uncredited)
- James Monroe Black as Colonel James Fannin (uncredited)
- Paul Suarez as Drummer Dick (uncredited)
- Mark Sevier as The Anahuac Delegate (uncredited)
- Katharine Ross as Susannah Dickinson (uncredited)
- William Schallert as The Narrator
