= Ghost Warrior =

2002 novel by Lucia St. Clair Robson

- Author: Lucia St. Clair Robson
- Language: English
- Genre: Historical novel, Western novel
- Publisher: Forge Books
- Publication date: 17 May 2002
- Publication place: United States
- Media type: Print (Hardback & Paperback)
- Pages: 608 pp (Paperback edition)
- ISBN: 0-8125-7609-8 (Paperback edition)
- OCLC: 52202964

Ghost Warrior, Lozen of the Apaches is a 2002 historical novel by Lucia St. Clair Robson. This novel was the runner-up for the Golden Spur Award in 2002.

== Plot summary ==
The Chiricahua Apache chief, Victorio, called his sister Lozen his wise counselor and his right hand. He said she had the strength of a man and was a shield to her people. Even in a society possessing extraordinary courage, endurance and skill, she was unique. The Apaches believe that when she was young, the spirits blessed her with horse magic, the gift of healing and the power to see enemies at a distance. In the Apaches' 30-year struggle to defend their homeland, they came to rely on her strength, wisdom, and supernatural abilities.

Because of her gift of far-sight, she was the only unmarried woman allowed to ride with the warriors and fight alongside them. After her beloved brother Victorio's death, she joined Geronimo's band of insurgents. With Geronimo and fifteen other warriors, she resisted the combined forces of the United States and Mexican armies, and the heavily armed civilian populations of New Mexico and Arizona Territories. She and the sixteen warriors, and seventeen women and children held out against a total of about nine thousand men.
