= Mary's Land =

1995 novel by Lucia St. Clair Robson

- First edition
- Author: Lucia St. Clair Robson
- Language: English
- Genre: Historical
- Publisher: Ballantine books
- Publication date: 1995
- Publication place: United States
- Media type: Print (hardback & paperback)
- Pages: 465 pp (Paperback edition)
- ISBN: 0345371968 (hardback edition)
- OCLC: 58796956

Mary's Land, by Lucia St. Clair Robson, is a 1995 historical novel, set in the year 1638. It is based on Margaret Brent's life.
