= Eliza Allen (Tennessee) =

First lady of Tennessee (1809–1861)

First Lady of Tennessee
- In office January 22, 1829 – April 16, 1829
- Governor: Sam Houston
- Preceded by: Cecelia Bradford
- Succeeded by: Mary Alexander

Personal details
- Born: Eliza H. Allen; December 2, 1809 Gallatin, Tennessee, United States
- Died: March 3, 1861 (aged 51) Gallatin, Tennessee
- Spouse(s): Sam Houston (m. 1829; div. 1837) Elmore Douglass (m. 1840)

Eliza (née Allen) Houston Douglass (Note: Also spelled Douglas.) (December 2, 1809 – March 3, 1861) was the first wife of Sam Houston. Their marriage, over after just eleven weeks, ended Houston's career as governor of Tennessee, United States. Houston resigned and went to the home of his foster father John Jolly, a leader of the Cherokee people. Allen returned to her family in Sumner County. For years, their marriage was the subject of rumors and theories about what made the marriage unsuitable to both Allen and Houston. They did not publicly expose any information about their marriage and they both seemed to be protective of one another's reputation. Allen's brother, Judge Benjamin Franklin Allen offered his opinion: "like many other couples they were not congenial".

After her brief time with Houston, Allen lived a quiet life. She took care of her younger sisters after her mother's death in 1832 and her father's death six months later. Houston and Allen's divorce was finalized in 1837. In 1840, Allen married a widower, Dr. Elmore Douglass. They had one son and three girls.

== Early life ==
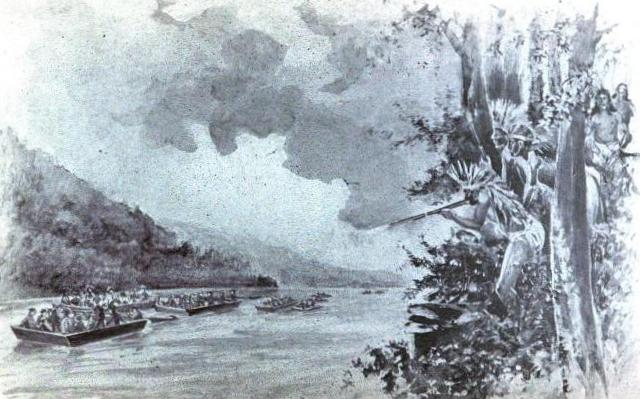
Artist's depiction of flatboats carrying settlers led by American explorer John Donelson down the Cumberland River in route to what is now Nashville, Tennessee, in 1784.

Born on December 2, 1809, near Gallatin, Tennessee, Eliza H. Allen, was the daughter of Laeticia Saunders and John Allen, a wealthy plantation owner of Allendale. His plantation was located along the Cumberland River near Gallatin in Sumner County, Tennessee. John Allen was one of the wealthiest planters in the county; he had 39 slaves according to the inventory of his estate in 1833.

The first of ten children born to the couple, she was described by a relative as "dignified, graceful, and queenly in her appearance… [with a face of] sweet, gentle, and winning expression."

John's brother was Robert Allen, a Tennessee congressman from 1823 to 1827. Houston came to know the John Allen family through Robert and General Andrew Jackson.

== Marriage to Sam Houston ==
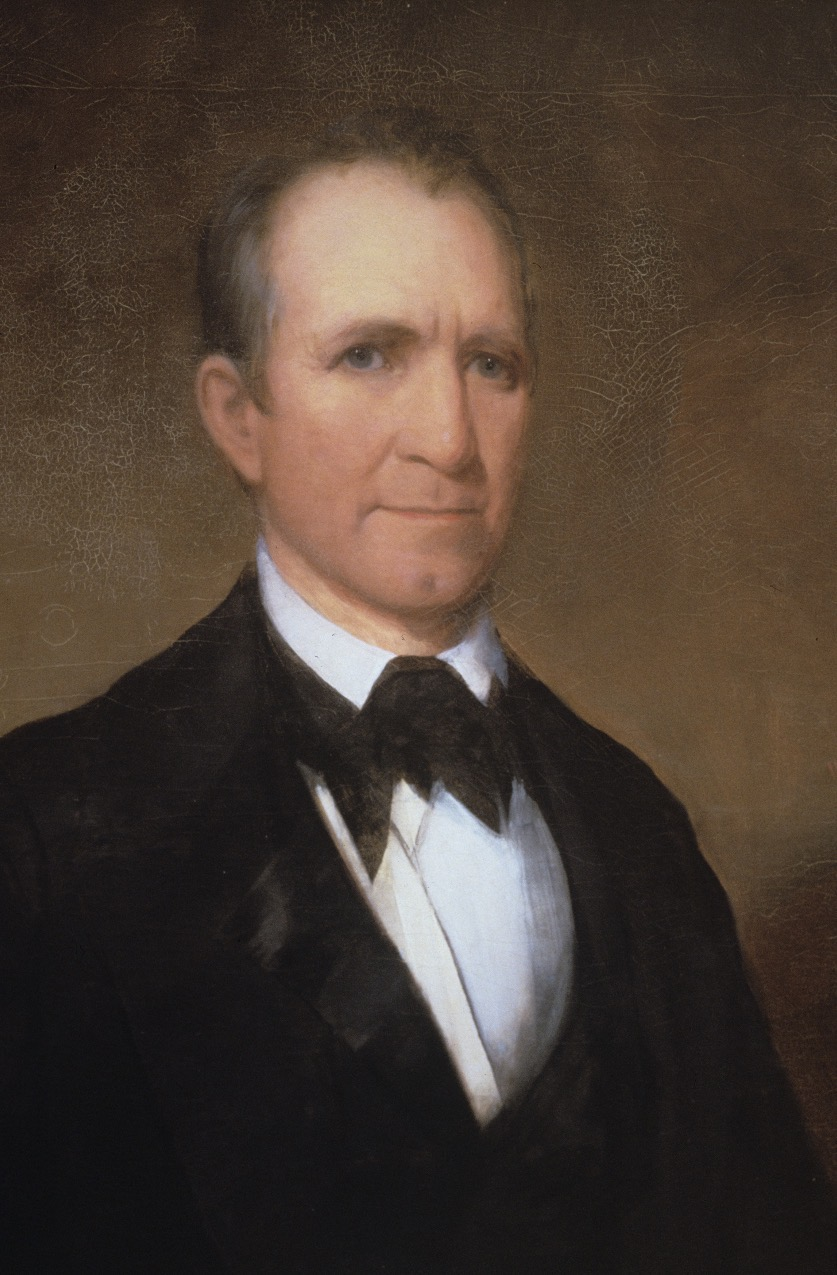
Washington Bogart Cooper, American frontiersman and statesman Sam Houston (1793–1863), 1845, Tennessee Portrait Project

=== Courtship ===
Houston first met Allen when she was thirteen. At that time, he and her Uncle Robert both served in the United States Congress. Houston was a frequent visitor over five years and he was invited to spend the Fourth of July with the Allen family in 1828. In August, he told John Allen that he wanted to marry his 18-year-old daughter. Allen said that she was interested in Houston because of his "brilliant conversation and his handsome and commanding presence."

Houston blushed when he talked about Eliza and in November 1828, he told his cousin John Houston that he intended to be married soon. He wrote of a "small blow up" and that he could not understand "what the devil is the matter with the gals I cant say but there has been hell to pay and no pitch hot" in December to John Marable, a United States Congressman. He also said to him "May God bless you, & it may be that I will splice myself with a rib." Houston believed that Allen loved him, but he had "a doubt that made him miserable".

Houston had a reputation for being a renegade, a drinker, and melodramatic. Andrew Jackson and John Allen believed that the marriage would infuse Houston's political fortunes. Henry Alexander Wise believed that Houston's interest in Allen was political, that he would benefit by marrying into the "popular" Allen family.

=== Marriage ===
On the day of his wedding, as Houston neared Allendale, he heard the distressed cry of a raven and saw its fluttering until it died in the dust, which he took to be a foreboding message. Allen cried while getting into her wedding gown. Even so, Allen married Houston, at that time the Governor of Tennessee, at Allendale on January 22, 1829, becoming the First Lady of Tennessee. She was nineteen, and Houston was 35.

On their wedding night, Houston felt that Allen was cool to him. He believed that Allen married him to please her father, and that she was in love with someone else. (Note: According to Mrs. E. L. Crocket, Allen was engaged to a lawyer named William Tyree who went to Missouri to build a law practice, but her parents wanted her to marry Houston. Tyree later died of consumption in Missouri. In 1829, Rev. Dr. Samson and a relative, Opie Read, stated that she was in love with Dr. Elmore Douglass, who was married at the time.) Allen was repulsed by the arrow wound that Houston received in 1814 at the Battle of Horseshoe Bend. Located in Houston's groin, it was a festering sore involving his intestines, and it gave off an offensive odor. (Note: William D. Haggard, her son-in-law, was at a time Houston’s physician. He said that the wound never healed. A barbed arrow had pierce his groin and into his intestines, and was a running sore that had not healed.) That night, they slept apart from one another.

The morning after the wedding, the couple rode on horseback towards Nashville. They spent the night at Locust Grove, the residence of Mrs. Martha Martin. Observing Houston losing a snowball battle with Martin's daughters, Allen mentioned twice that she hoped that they would kill him. The second time she stated to Martha, "Yes, I wish from the bottom of my heart that they would kill him." It was the only recorded comment from Allen about Houston during their short marriage. After breakfast, the Houstons continued on their journey and they settled at the Nashville Inn.

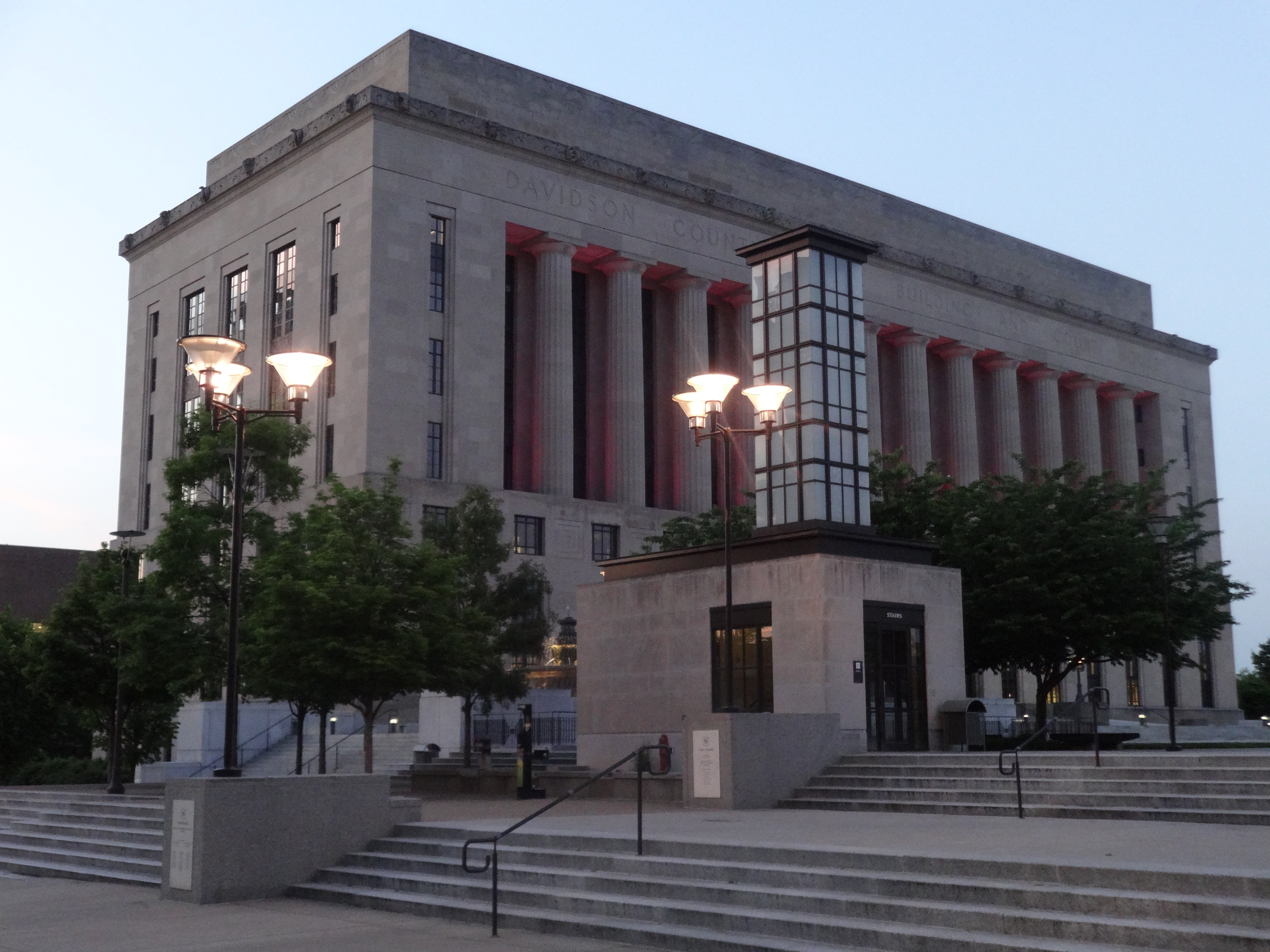
Davidson County Courthouse, Nashville, Tennessee, where Sam Houston operated when Governor of Tennessee

During the days, Houston worked at the capitol, which at the time did business in the Davidson County Courthouse. In the evenings he campaigned for his second term as governor, or entertained. (Note: Allegedly, one day he found Allen crying over old love letters when he returned to their rooms.)

Over the course of her life, Allen was known to have only two conversations about her marriage, one with Balie Peyton, her friend, and another with a relative. According to Peyton, Allen said that she went into the marriage hoping for a good union, but left him for good reasons; He was insanely jealous and suspicious, one time locking her in their room, so that she had no food until late at night. He did not like her to speak to others and even at her aunt's house he wanted her to remain in her room during the periods when Houston was not around. She told Balie Peyton that she left him because he "evinced no confidence in my integrity and had no respect for my intelligence, or trust in my discretion." He held on to this information until he was on his death bed." She was accustomed to caring parents and Houston was coarse and jealous. He may have developed his lovemaking skills from life in the Cherokee village, which might seem unusual to Allen. She was just nineteen years of age, inexperienced in love, perhaps only having had a boyhood sweetheart.

According to Allen's friend and relative with the initials "M.B.H.", Houston vacillated between expressing fondness and being an angry, jealous "maniac" who questioned that any woman was pure. Within a matter of a few weeks, Houston aged several years, according to his friend Frank Chambers. On April 9, Houston wrote a letter to John Allen stating that he was confused by his wife's coldness and he questioned whether she loved him. He expressed that he now found her to be virtuous and was concerned that he may have ruined their marriage and asked for his advice on how to restore it.

On April 11, Houston traveled to Cockrill Springs for an election debate. After eleven weeks of marriage, Allen left Houston on the same day to return to her family. She traveled on horseback back to Gallitin, stopping one night at Martha Martin's home for the night. (Note: John Allen may have traveled to Nashville to escort his daughter home.) Martin stated that she and Houston had agreed to separate and she was slightly depressed. When Houston was asked to provide a statement about the separation, he said "I can make no explanation. I exonerate this lady fully, and do not justify myself."

=== Houston's retreat ===
Houston went to Allen, likely on April 15, and begged her to take him back. He "knelt before her and with tears streaming down his face implored forgiveness…and insisted with all his dramatic force that she return to Nashville with him". She stayed. The following day he resigned as governor of Tennessee.

On April 23, he wore a disguise and boarded a steamboat out of Nashville. He was headed for the Arkansas Territory to rejoin the Cherokee. In the meantime, two of Allen's brothers, one of whom was George Webster Allen, rode across the country to intercept the steamboat at Clarksville, which had made several stops to load freight. Heavily armed and excited, they explained to Houston that there were a number of rumors about their separation, one of which was that he was so upset to learn of Allen's crime that he went insane. They wanted Houston's denial of the accusations. Houston told the brothers to "go back and publish in the Nashville papers that if any wretch ever dares to utter a word against the purity of Mrs. Houston I will come back and write the libel in his heart's blood." What caused the demise of the marriage was something that Houston kept secret throughout his lifetime. (Note: When he was about to marry Margaret Lea in 1840, a male member of the family asked to know what caused the collapse of his marriage to Allen, Houston stated that if the wedding "dependent on his telling what he had never told to anyone and never expected to tell that he might call his fiddlers off", which ended that line of conversation.)

He traveled on to the home of John Jolly, also known as Chief Oolooteka, who took him in as a boy. He later said of that night, "When I lay myself down to sleep that night I felt like a weary wanderer returned at last to his father's house." During this time with the Cherokee, he became known as the "big drunk", although he had been a drinker and womanizer before his marriage. After Houston's marriage, he ceased to be the protege of Andrew Jackson, who had helped him become a congressman and the governor of Tennessee.

Although he was still legally married to Allen, in the summer of 1830 Houston married Dianna Rogers (sometimes called Tiana), daughter of Chief John "Hellfire" Rogers (1740–1833), a Scots-Irish trader, and Jennie Due (1764–1806), a sister of Chief John Jolly, in a Cherokee ceremony. The ceremony was modest since it was Dianna's second marriage; she was widowed with two children from her previous marriage: Gabriel, born 1819, and Joanna, born 1822. She and Houston first met when she was ten years old, and he was stunned to see how beautiful she was when he returned to her village years later. The two lived together for several years. Tennessee society disapproved of the marriage because under civil law, he was still legally married to Eliza Allen Houston. Houston went to Texas in 1832, and left Dianna behind.

At some point, Allen had decided that she wanted to try again at their marriage, but by that time Houston had cooled to her. He tried unsuccessfully to divorce Allen in 1833 in the Mexican State of Coahuilla and Texas. In 1837, after becoming President of the Republic of Texas, he was able to acquire, from a district court judge, a divorce from Eliza Allen.

=== Allen's return to Allendale ===
Allen secluded herself when she returned to Allendale. She shut herself in her room and refused to eat. She dressed plainly and focused her energy on the care of her younger sisters. Her mother gave birth to her tenth child and a week later died in November 1832. In April 1833, John Allen died in an accident. She moved into Gallatin with the family and a few servants. She was said to be well-respected among her family and her few intimate friends.

Although she did not wish to see Houston again, she was glad to hear of good news and of his successes, such as when he became the president of the Republic of Texas. She became upset when others spoke ill of him. Most of what has been written about Allen since the spring of 1829 is speculation. Those who knew her depicted her as an "intense but controlled personality inclined, in later life, to detachment."

== Second marriage ==
On November 8, 1840, Allen married Dr. Elmore Douglass, a widower with numerous children. Some sources say he had three girls. Author James L. Haley said Douglass already had ten children when he married Allen. Together they had one son and three daughters, only one of whom survived into adulthood. Their children were: Harriet Louise Douglas who was born September 2, 1843, and died on September 26, 1853. William K. Douglas was born on June 23, 1848, and died on February 25, 1849. Susie Miller died January 19, 1879. Their daughter Margaret Allen Douglass married Dr. W. D. Haggard.

== Death ==
Before her death, she asked that her letters and papers be burned, all images of her destroyed, and that she be buried in an unmarked grave. She died on March 3, 1861, of stomach cancer. (Note: She is also said to have died by falling through a trap door "carelessly left open" at a Gallatin theatre, attending her children's rehearsals for a production in the winter of 1862. She was said to have broken her hip and died soon after. However, she had only one living child (Susie) at that time, and was said to have died of stomach cancer.) She was interred at the Gallatin Cemetery. Eliza and Elmore were buried together near their youngest daughter, Susie Miller Douglass. Her gravesite remained unmarked for 100 years. Nothing in her handwriting has been found.

In response to rumors of Allen's character after her death, Josephus C. Guild of Gallatin states that Allen "was a modest, retiring lady from her early youth until her death. There was not, nor is there now [anyone who] believed that Houston's wife was guilty of any impropriety, or ever in her intercourse, either before or after her marriage, did anything affecting her unsullied honor." He mentioned governors, a judge, generals, and a colonel who "sympathized with her in her misfortune".

== In popular culture ==
- Allen is the subject of the historical novel The Raven's Bride by Elizabeth Crook.
- Joan Fontaine portrayed Allen in Man of Conquest, a 1939 American Western film
- Allen was portrayed by Claudia Christian in Gone to Texas.
