= Senate Document =

Official documents from the US Senate

A Senate Document (often abbreviated S. Doc.) is an official document ordered to be printed by the United States Senate. Documents are numbered in a serial manner for inclusion in the U.S. Serial Set, and serve a major part of the historical record of the Senate. Documents can include reports of executive departments and agencies, texts of various presidential communications to Congress, accounts of committee activities and committee-sponsored special studies, and miscellaneous publications such as ceremonial tributes to individuals or reports of patriotic organizations.
