= Lucia St. Clair Robson =

American novelist

Lucia St. Clair Robson (born 1942) is an American historical novelist. She is a 1982 and 2010 recipient of the Spur Award for Best Novel of the West. She was married to science fiction novelist Brian Daley.

== Works ==
- Ride the Wind (1982)
- Walk in My Soul (1985)
- Light a Distant Fire (1988)
- The Tokaido Road (1991)
- Mary's Land (1995)
- Fearless, A Novel of Sarah Bowman (1998)
- Ghost Warrior (2001)
- Shadow Patriots (2005)
- "A Chance of a Ghost", short story in Twilight Zone: 19 Original Stories on the 50th Anniversary (2009)
- Last Train from Cuernavaca (2010)
