= Battle of Monterrey =

1846 battle of the Mexican-American War

Coordinates: 25.6822°N 100.3111°W

- Part of Mexican–American War
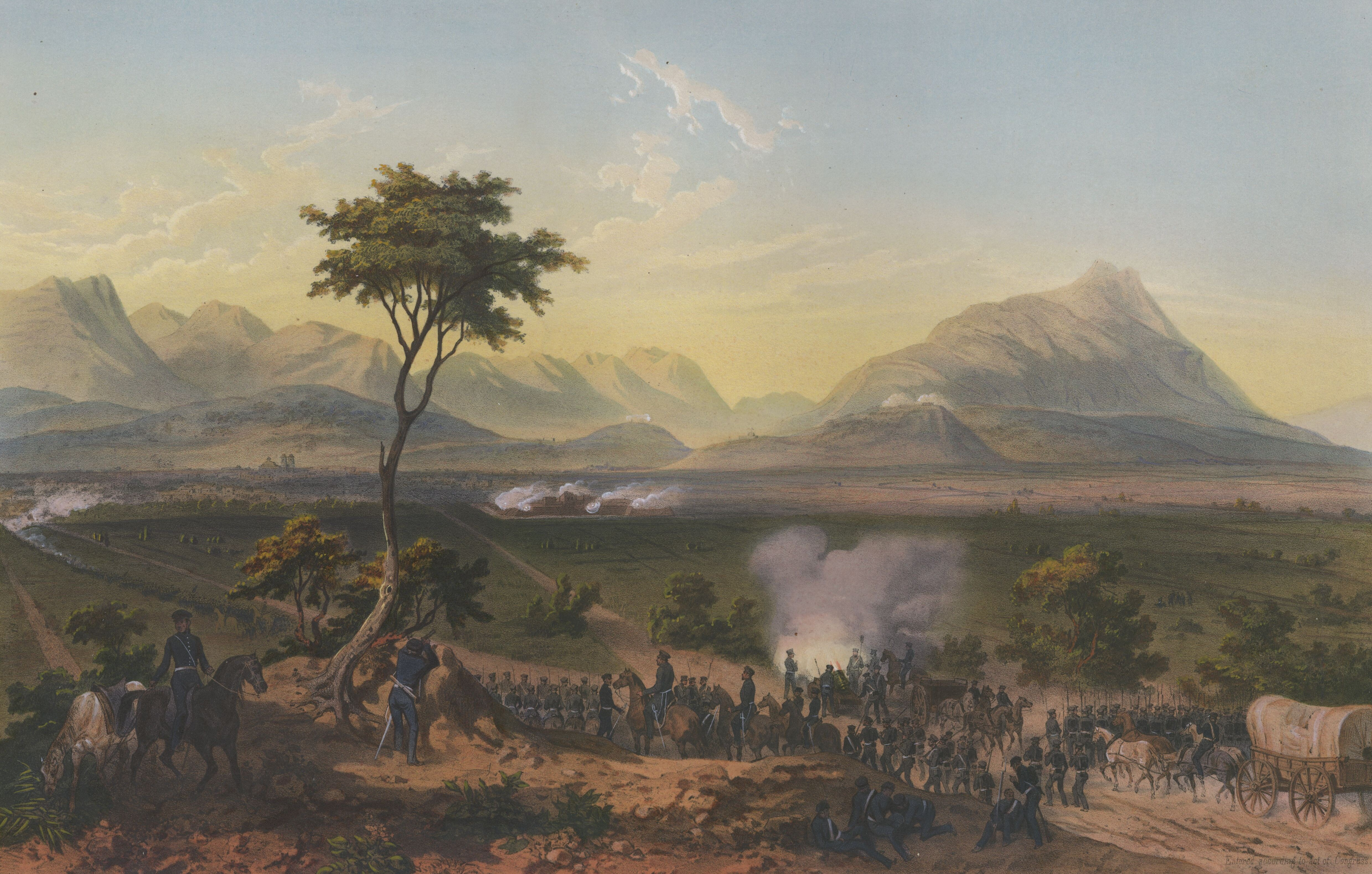
- 1851 lithograph of the battle by Carl Nebel
Date	September 21–24, 1846
Location	Monterrey, Nuevo León
Result	American victory

Belligerents
United States	Mexico

Commanders and leaders
Zachary Taylor	Pedro de Ampudia; Jose Garcia-Conde; Francisco Mejia

Strength
6,220	7,303

Casualties and losses
Total: 531; 120 killed 368 wounded 43 missing	367 killed & wounded

In the Battle of Monterrey (September 21–24, 1846) during the Mexican–American War, General Pedro de Ampudia and the Mexican Army of the North was defeated by the Army of Occupation, a force of United States Regulars, Volunteers, and Texas Rangers under the command of General Zachary Taylor.

The hard-fought urban combat led to heavy casualties on both sides. The battle ended with both sides negotiating a two-month armistice and the Mexican forces being allowed to make an orderly evacuation in return for the surrender of the city.

== Background ==
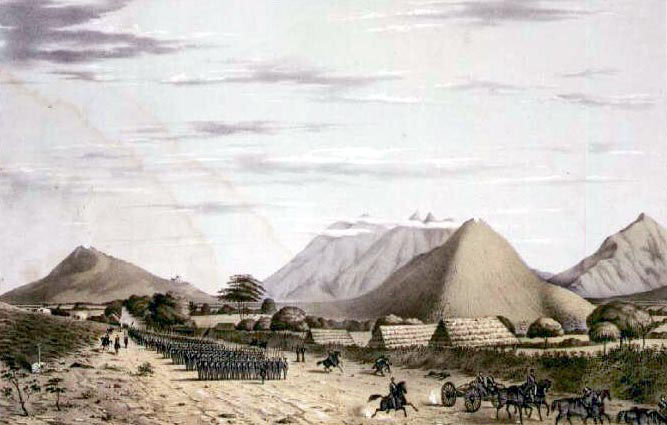
Gen. Worth's division marches on Monterrey from the west

Following the Battle of Resaca de la Palma, Taylor crossed the Rio Grande on 18 May, while in early June, Mariano Arista turned over command of what remained of his army, 2,638 men, to Francisco Mejia, who led them to Monterrey. On 8 June, United States Secretary of War William L. Marcy ordered Taylor to continue command of operations in northern Mexico, suggested taking Monterrey, and defined his objective to "dispose the enemy to desire an end to the war." On 8 August, Taylor established the headquarters for his Army of Occupation in Camargo, Tamaulipas and then in Cerralvo on 9 September with 6,640 men. Taylor resumed the march to Monterrey on 11 September, reaching Marin on 15 September and departing on 18 September

In early July, General Tomas Requena garrisoned Monterrey with 1,800 men, with the remnants of Arista's army and additional forces from Mexico City arriving by the end of August such that the Mexican forces totaled 7,303 men. General Pedro de Ampudia received orders from Antonio López de Santa Anna to retreat further to the city of Saltillo, where Ampudia was to establish a defensive line, but Ampudia disagreed, sensing glory if he could stop Taylor's advance. Ampudia's forces included reinforcements from Mexico City totaling 3,140 men: 1,080 men of the Garcia-Conde Brigade (Gen. Jose Garcia Conde) (Aguascalientes and Querétaro Battalions, two squadrons of the 3d Line Cavalry, three guns (3—8 lbs)), a thousand men of the Azpeitia Brigade (Col. Florencio Azpeitia) (3d Line, two squadrons of the Jalisco lancers, two squadrons of the Guanajuato Cavalry Regiment, six guns (8 and 12 lbs.) and an ambulance), 1,060 men of the Simeon Ramirez Brigade (Acting Gen. Ramirez) (3d and 4th Light, three guns (1—8 lbs, 2—12 lbs) and three howitzers 7" (Capt. P. Gutierrez and Comdte. A. Nieto)) and an artillery unit, the largely Irish-American volunteers called San Patricios (or the Saint Patrick's Battalion), in their first major engagement against U.S. forces.

== Battle ==
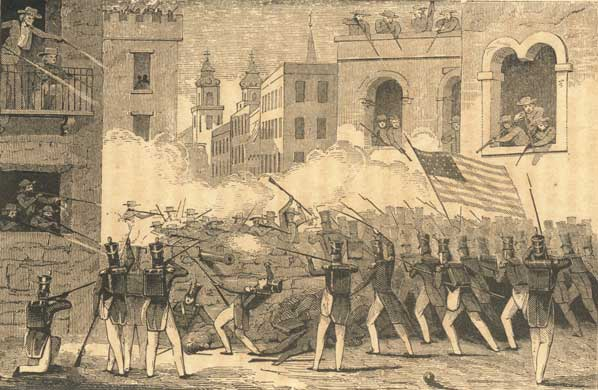
American depiction of the fighting within the city

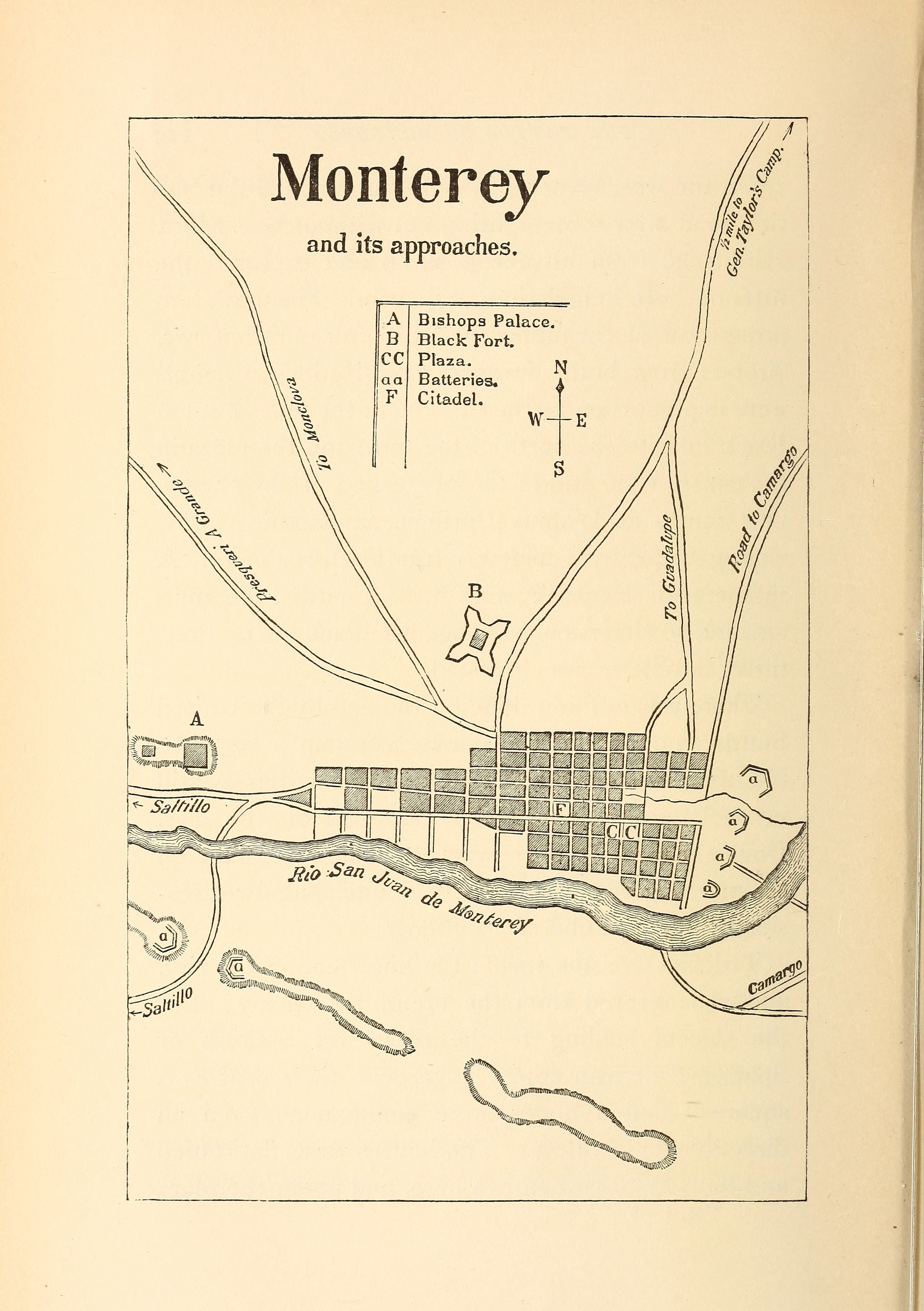
Map of the town's defences that appeared in Personal Memoirs of Ulysses S. Grant. Forts de La Teneria and Diablo are to the east of the city. Fort Soldado is in the lower left.

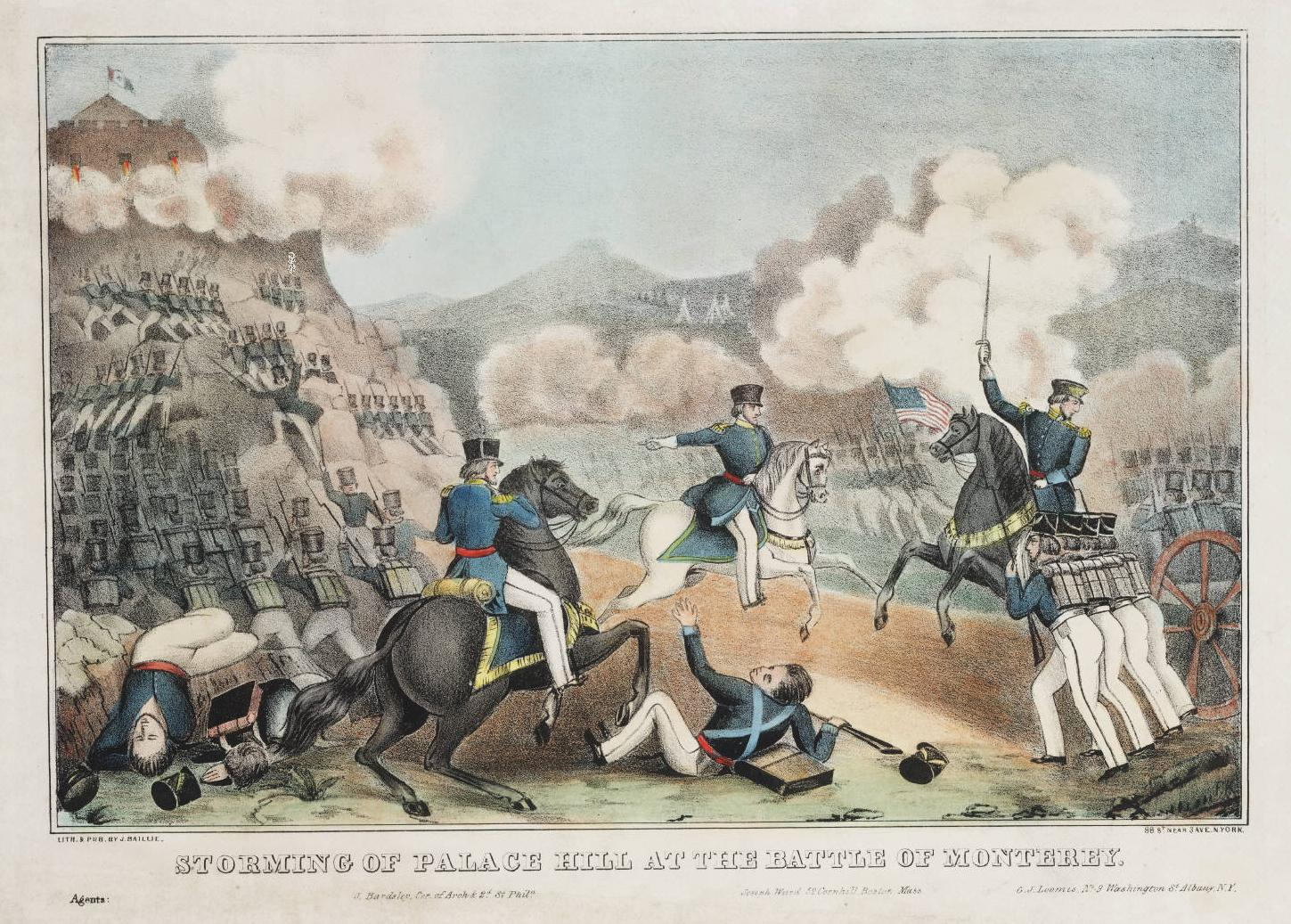
Storming of Palace Hill at the Battle of Monterey by Tompkins Harrison Matteson, c. 1855

Taylor's army, with the Texas Division leading under the command of Major General and Texas Governor James Pinckney Henderson, reached the plain in front of Monterrey at 9 am on the morning of 19 September, when they were fired upon by Col. José López Uraga's 4th Infantry guns, located at San Patricio Battery atop the citadel. Taylor ordered the army to camp at Bosque de San Domingo while engineers under the command of Major Joseph K. Mansfield reconnoitered.

Besides the citadel, Mexican strong points within the city included the "Black Fort" (Col. Jose Lopez Uraga, 3d & 4th Line and 9 guns – incl. "San Patricio" Battery); "the Tannery," La Teneria, (2d Ligero under Col. José M. Carrasco and part of the Querétaro Battalion, and 2 guns and 1 mountain howitzer – Lt (?) J. Espejo) El Fortín del Rincón del Diablo (Lt. Col. Calisto Bravo and 3 guns – Capt. Ignacio Joaquin del Arenal); La Purísima bridge and tete-de-pont (Activos of Aguascalientes under Col. Jose Ferro and the Querétaro under Comdte. José María Herrera 3 guns – Capt. P. Gutierez). West of the city atop Independencia stood Ft. Libertad (4 guns) and the Obispado (bishop's place) with the Activos of Mexico commanded by Lt. Col. Francisco de Berra and 3 guns and 1 howitzer, and atop Federacion was a redan (2 guns) and Fort Soldado. In reserve at la Plaza was the 3d Ligero under Lt. Col. Juan Castro and one gun of Lt. Agustín Espinosa.

General Zachary Taylor decided to attack western Monterrey using William J. Worth's Division in a giant north and west "hook" movement while simultaneously attacking with his main body from the east. Worth started at 2 pm on 20 September with Col. John Coffee Hays's Texas Mounted Riflemen Regiment screening the advance, but camped for the night three miles from the Saltillo road.

By 6 am on 21 September, Worth continued his advance, repulsing a Jalisco cavalry charge by Col. Juan Nájera, killing the latter, and an advance guard consisting of General Manuel Romero's brigade and Lt. Col. Mariano Moret's Guanajuato Regiment. By 8:15 am, Worth had severed the Saltillo road from Monterrey and sent Capt. Charles F. Smith with 300 infantry and Texans, plus Capt. Dixon Miles's 7th Infantry and Persifor Smith's 2nd Brigade to take Federacion and Fort Soldado, which they quickly did.

In the meantime, Taylor launched a diversion against eastern Monterrey with Col. John Garland's 1st and 3d Infantry plus Lt. Col. William H. Watson's Maryland and District of Columbia Battalion, which quickly grew into an assault. By 8 am, Capt. Electus Backus's company of the 1st Infantry had taken the tannery and by noon, with Col. William B. Campbell's 1st Tennessee and Col. Jefferson Davis' Mississippi Rifles, had taken Fort de La Teneria.

No attacks or sorties occurred on 22 September.

At 3 am on 23 September, Worth sent the Texas Rangers and the 4th and 8th Infantry, under Lt. Col. Thomas Childs, to take Fort Libertad on Independencia, which they did by daybreak. With the help of James Duncan's battery, they soon took the Obispado and had control of western Monterrey. By then, the Mexicans had abandoned their outer defenses on the east side of Monterrey, concentrating in the Plaza Mayor, and John A. Quitman's brigade held eastern Monterrey by 11 am.

During the exchange of fire, a young Mexican woman named María Josefa Zozaya wandered into the crossfire to tend to the wounds of injured soldiers of both armies. Maria would survive the battle and go on to marry and have six children. Maria would die in 1860 at the age of 38.

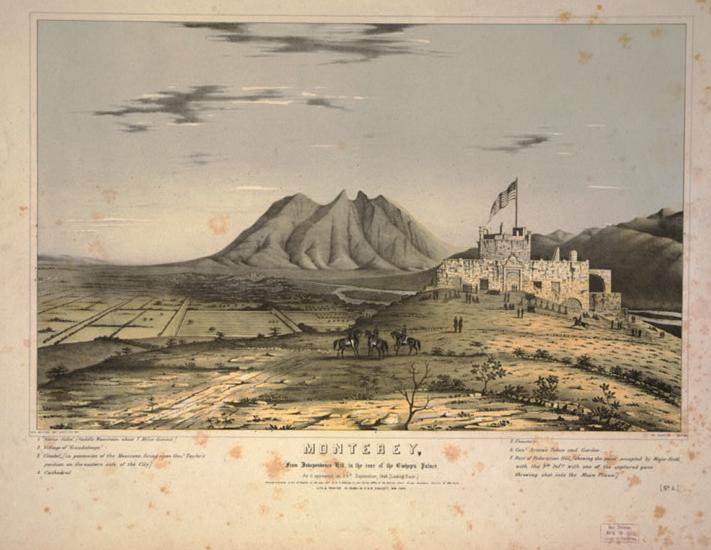
Monterrey from Independence Hill, in the rear of the Bishop´s Palace. On stone by F. Swington. Colored by G. & W. Edicott, New York. The 1847 image depicts the Saddle Hill and the bishop's house in Monterrey after the battle.

By 2 pm on 23 September, General Worth advanced into the city from the west, mouse-holing from house to house, supported in the late afternoon by a mortar set up in Plaza de la Capella, and were within a block west of the plaza by 11 pm. The Texan volunteers taught the U.S. regulars new techniques for fighting in the city, techniques that they did not employ on 21 September, which led to staggering casualties. Armed with these new urban warfare skills, the U.S. Army, along with Texan, Mississippian, and Tennessee volunteers moved house to house, rooting out Mexican soldiers hiding on rooftops and inside the thick, adobe-walled houses of northern Mexico. By 2 pm, Taylor and Quitman were within two blocks east of the plaza when Taylor ordered a withdrawal before nightfall.

General Ampudia decided to negotiate on 24 September. Taylor negotiated a two-month armistice, along the line Rinconada Pass-Linares-San Fernando de Parras, in return for the surrender of the city. The Mexican Army was allowed to march from the city from 26 to 28 September, with their personal arms and one field battery of six guns.

== Aftermath ==
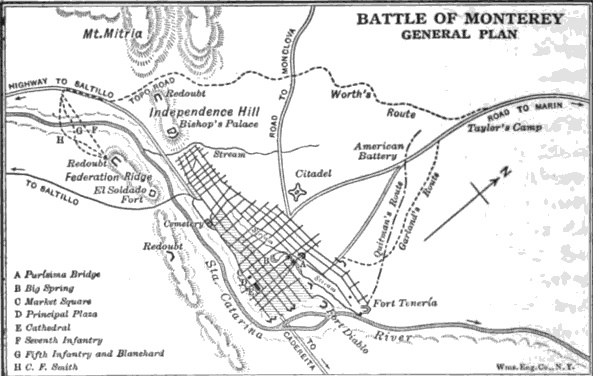
Monterrey disposition of forces

Ampudia had moved beyond the armistice line by 30 September and San Luis Potosi by early November.

The resulting armistice signed between Taylor and Ampudia had major effects upon the outcome of the war. Taylor was lambasted by some in the federal government, where President James K. Polk insisted that the U.S. Army had no authority to negotiate truces, only to "kill the enemy." In addition, his terms of armistice, which allowed Ampudia's forces to retreat with their weapons, were seen as foolish and short-sighted by some U.S. observers. For his part, some have argued that Ampudia had begun the defeat of Mexico. Many Mexican soldiers became disenchanted with the war. In a well-fortified, well-supplied position, an army of ten thousand Mexican soldiers had resisted the U.S. Army for three days, only to be forced into surrender by American urban battle tactics, heavy artillery and possibly further division in the Mexican ranks.

The invading army occupied the city and remained until June 18, 1848. As soon as the occupation occurred, the U.S. Army committed several executions of civilians and several women were raped. Among the most memorable massacres is the one reported by the Houston Telegraph and Register on January 4, 1847, when Kentucky volunteers blamed the Mexicans for the death of several of their companions in Monterrey. Consequently, Americans began to shoot all civilians they encountered. The newspaper, citing military sources reported more than fifty civilians killed in Monterrey in a single event. Similar acts of violence occurred in other surrounding occupied towns such as Marín (which was destroyed and set on fire), Apodaca as well as other towns between the Rio Grande and Monterrey. In most cases those attacks were perpetrated by the Texas Rangers. Several American volunteers condemned the attacks, and blamed the Texas Rangers for committing crimes on civilians for revenge of the former Mexican campaigns in Texas. Before and after the US occupation, a large number of civilians fled the city. In response to the occupation several local guerrilla groups emerged such as those led by Antonio Canales Rosillo and José de Urrea, the latter widely repudiated by the Texans because of his leadership participation in the campaigns of the Texas War ten years earlier. Taylor admitted the atrocities committed by his men, but took no action to punish them.

== Order of battle ==
=== United States ===
Army of Occupation

=== Mexico ===
Army of the North

- Gen. div. Pedro de Ampudia, Commanding
  - Chief of Staff: Gen. J. Garcia Conde
  - Chief Engineer: Capt. Luis Robles
  - Zapadores Battalion: Lt. Col. Mariano Reyes
- Chief of Artillery: Gen. Tomas Requena
  - Battery: Comdte Luis Nieto (3 howitzers)
  - Battery: Capt. Ignacio J. del Arana (3—8 lbs.)
  - Battery: Capt. Patricio Gutierrez (2—12 lbs and 1—8 lbs.)
  - Battery: Capt. Jacinto Dominquez (?)
  - Battery: Saint Patrick's Battalion (John Riley)
- 1st Infantry Brigade: Acting gen. Simeon Ramirez
  - 3d & 4th Ligero (Light) Aguascalientes Activos
- 2d Infantry Brigade: Act.gen. Francisco Mejia
  - 2d Ligero, 6th & 10th Line, Querétaro Activos
- 3d Infantry Brigade: Col. Jose Lopez Uraga
  - 3d & 4th Line, Mexico 1st Activos
- 1st Cavalry Brigade: Act. gen. Anastasio Torrejon
  - 1st, 7th & 8th Cavalry, Mexico Light Mounted
- 2d Cavalry Brigade: Act.gen. Manuel Romerro
  - 3d Cavalry, Jalisco Lancers, Guanajauto and San Luis Potosi Activos

== See also ==
- List of battles of the Mexican–American War
