= Bennet C. Riley =

United States Army general and politician (1790–1853)

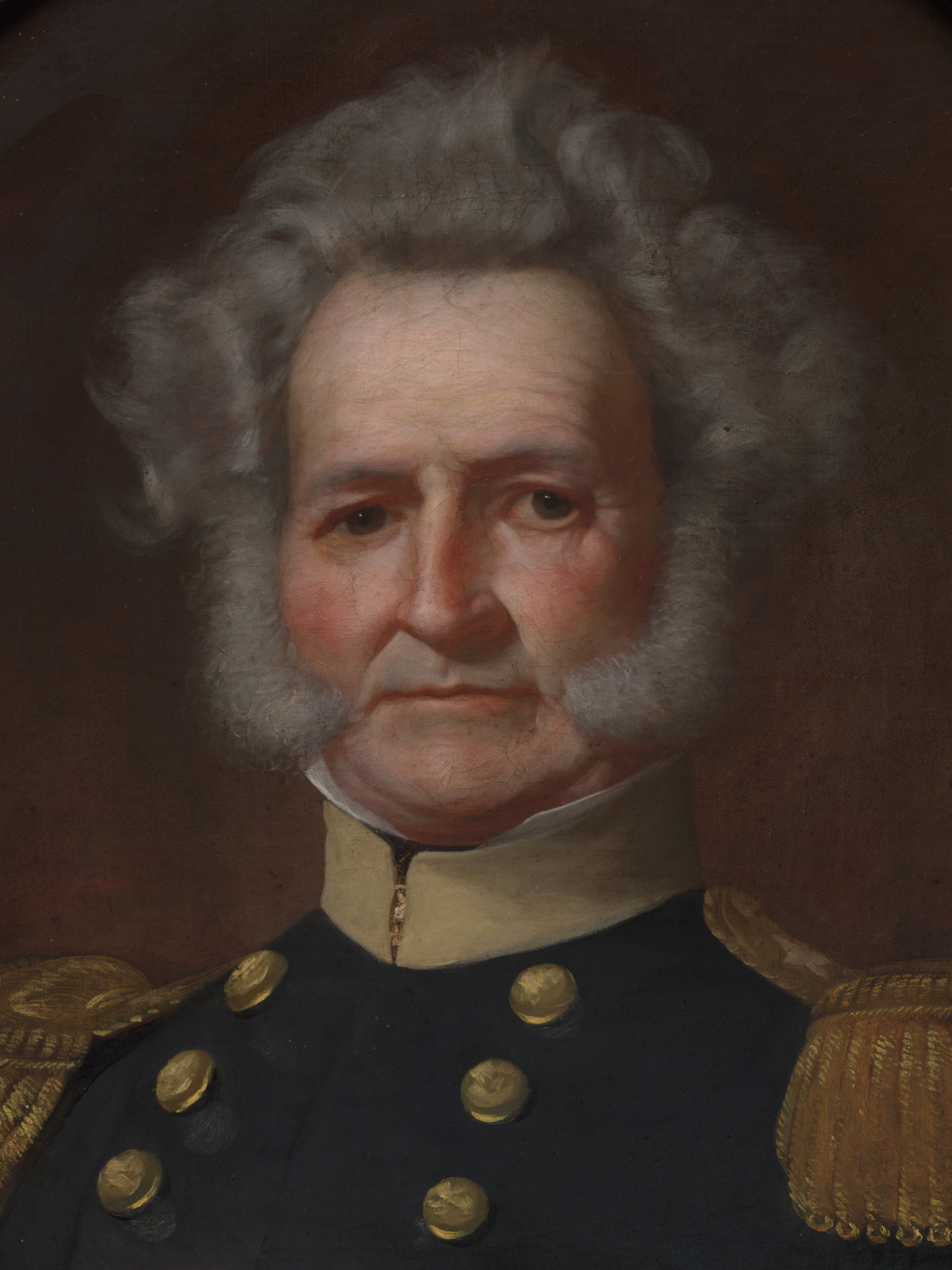
- 1852 portrait of Riley

7th Military Governor of California
- In office April 12, 1849 – December 20, 1849
- Preceded by: Persifor Frazer Smith
- Succeeded by: Peter Hardeman Burnett as first Governor of California (Note: California joined the U.S. as a state the year after he took office, in 1850.)

Personal details
- Born: November 27, 1787 St. Mary's County, Maryland, U.S.
- Died: June 9, 1853 (aged 65) Black Rock, near Buffalo, New York, U.S.
- Resting place: Forest Lawn Cemetery, Buffalo
- Spouse: Arabella Israel Riley
- Profession: Soldier

Military service
- Allegiance: United States of America
- Branch/service: United States Army
- Years of service: 1813–1850
- Rank: Colonel; Bvt. Major General
- Unit: U.S. Regiment of Riflemen; 5th U.S. Infantry; 6th U.S. Infantry
- Commands: 2nd U.S. Infantry; Riley's Brigade; Department of Upper California; 1st U.S. Infantry
- Battles/wars: War of 1812; Arikara War; 2nd Seminole War; Mexican–American War

Bennet C. Riley (Note: His name is sometimes written as Bennett, but his own correspondence uses the spelling of Bennet. For an example, see here.) (November 27, 1787 – June 9, 1853) was the seventh and last military governor of California. Riley ordered the election of representatives to a state constitutional convention, and handed over all civil authority to a governor and elected delegates at the end of 1849; the following year, California joined the U.S. as a state. (Note: Unlike most western states, California was never a U.S. Territory) He participated in the War of 1812 on Lake Ontario. He also served in the United States Army during the Seminole War in Florida, and Mexican–American War.

== Early life and family ==
Riley was born to an Irish-Catholic couple, Bennet Riley and Susanna Ann Drury, in St. Mary's, Maryland, 1787. His father apprenticed him to a cobbler; later, he served as a foreman in a shoe factory. After his father's death in 1811, he signed up for service on a privateer.

Riley married Arabella Israel, of Philadelphia, on 9 November 1834, at the Jefferson Barracks, Lemay, Missouri. They had eight children: William Davenport Riley and Samuel Israel Riley, twins, died in Fort King, Florida, on 15 and 17 November 1841; Bennet Israel Riley, born 1835 in Massachusetts, served in the Navy and died aboard the war-sloop USS Albany, which disappeared with all hands in September 1854; Mary, born 1836; Arabella I. Riley, 1837–1916) (never married); George, born 1838; and Edward Bishop Dudley Riley (1839–1918), whose military career was split between the Union and Confederate armies. (Note: Edward Riley, born in 1839 in Indian Territory, Oklahoma, graduated from West Point in 1860. There is some conflict with the sources over his subsequent service. Sources about his father report that he served with the 4th Infantry in California; upon the outbreak of war in 1861, he resigned his commission on 13 June 1861, and left with Lewis Armistead for Texas, and then to Virginia. He served as a staff officer, under Braxton Bragg and Albert Sidney Johnston and several others, as part of the Confederate staff. According to Army records, he served as a corporal in the 2nd Infantry, and deserted in June 1861 in Troy, New York. He is listed in the "Officers of the 4th Infantry Present and Absent in September 1861", and in the US Army Historical Register.)

Ulysses S. Grant described Bennet Riley as "the finest specimen of physical manhood I had ever looked upon...6'2 (190 cm) in his stocking feet, straight as the undrawn [sic] bowstring, broad shouldered with every limb in perfect proportion, with an eagle and a step as light as a forest tiger." An accident or injury in his youth caused him to lose part of his palate, and he spoke with a hoarse voice.

== War of 1812 ==
Riley volunteered for service in the War of 1812, and on 19 January 1813, he was appointed Ensign of Rifles. In March of the same year, he became a third lieutenant and in April 1814 a second lieutenant in the First Rifles. He saw action at Sackets Harbor, New York, in second of two battles for control of the shipyards on Lake Ontario. He gained a promotion to first lieutenant in March 1817. Riley was further advanced to captain in the 5th U.S. Infantry, and by 1821 he was transferred to the 6th U.S. Infantry.

== Military operations against the Arikara Indians ==
The officer joined his superior, Colonel Henry Leavenworth, in an engagement against the Arikara Indians in August 1823. Riley was honored for ten years of faithful service by being promoted to brevet major on 6 August 1828, leading the first military escort along the Santa Fe Trail in 1829. Among those he escorted were Charles Bent, future first territorial Governor of New Mexico during the later Mexican-American War.

== Seminole Wars ==
He had tenures as major in the 4th U.S. Infantry (1837) and lieutenant colonel, 2nd U.S. Infantry, beginning in December 1839. The Battle of Chokachotta in Florida took place on 2 June 1840. Colonel Riley was cited for bravery and good conduct during this engagement in the Seminole Wars. He gained the rank of Brevet Colonel in February 1844.

== Mexican-American War ==
During the Mexican–American War, as colonel of the 2nd U.S. Infantry, Riley fought at the Siege of Veracruz and the Battle of Cerro Gordo, where he was cited for bravery. He was brevetted brigadier general and assumed command of the 2nd Brigade in David E. Twiggs's Second Division. He led his brigade at the Battle of Contreras and the Battle of Churubusco, where Winfield Scott gave him credit for the U.S. victory: Riley had discovered a way around the rear of Velencia's position. He was appointed brevet major general and fought at the Chapultepec. After the battle at Churubusco, he also presided over the courts-martial of 72 deserters of the so-called Saint Patrick's Battalion discovered hiding in the San Patricios convent; among them were John Murphy and John Riley. He was generally considered one of the ablest brigade commanders in the army during the war with Mexico.

== Role in California statehood ==
After the war with Mexico, Riley served a brief stint at Fort Hamilton, in Brooklyn, New York, in 1848. In the years 1849 and 1850, General Riley commanded the Military Department in Upper California and exercised the duties of Provincial Governor: the inaction of Congress in deciding the issue of California statehood complicated his service. He relieved Bvt. Gen. Persifor Frazer Smith on 13 April 1849, as the Gold Rush worked into its most violent phase. In addition to the influx of prospectors seeking their fortunes, daily desertions of his own men rapidly depleted his troops. At the height of the Gold Rush, he had eight companies of infantry, two artillery, and two dragoons stretched between San Diego and San Francisco. When Congress refused to act on the statehood of California and New Mexico, he called for the election of civil officers to a de facto government. Consequently, the military authorities could not prevent the slaughter of California's native population, nor could they suppress the violence in the lawless gold camps. He relinquished all his civil power on 20 December 1849. While governor, Riley had tasked Lieutenant Edward Ord with creating the first map of Los Angeles in preparation for statehood.

After his administrative service concluded on the Pacific, Riley was ordered to take command of a regiment on the Rio Grande. However ill-health prevented further service on his part. He returned to his home in Black Rock, near Buffalo, New York, where he died of cancer. General Riley died on Thursday evening, 9 June 1853, survived by his wife Arabella (who died on 12 February 1894) and four children. Riley is buried at Forest Lawn Cemetery, Buffalo.

== Legacy ==
On 27 June 1853, Camp Center (Kansas Territory) was named Fort Riley in Bennet Riley's honor, even though he never served at the fort, and it was a cavalry post, while Riley's career was that of an infantryman. Riley County, Kansas is also named in his honor.

== Notes and citations ==
=== Citations ===
Political offices
Preceded by Persifor Frazer Smith	Military Governor of California; April 12, 1849 – December 20, 1849	Succeeded by Governor of California; Peter Hardeman Burnett
