= Roger Cudney =

American actor (1936–2021)

- Born: 22 June 1936; Cleveland, Ohio, U.S.
- Died: 5 July 2021 (aged 85); Mexico City, Mexico
- Other name: Roger C. Cudney
- Occupations: Actor, singer
- Years active: 1971-2021

Roger C. Cudney (June 22, 1936 – July 5, 2021) was an American actor and singer, long based in Mexico.

== Life and career ==
Cudney was born in Cleveland, Ohio in 1936. He first arrived in Mexico City in the 1960s in the cast of the touring musical Show Boat. He worked for CBS as a radio announcer covering the 1968 Summer Olympics, and later the Acapulco Film Festival.

Cudney was known for starring in numerous Mexican films and telenovelas in which he often portrayed authoritarian characters or other villains. In 2003, The Wall Street Journal described his career playing 'unpopular gringos', writing:

Some Mexicans know him as a plunderer of ancient archaeological treasures. Others remember him as the union-busting manager of a sweatshop. Still others recognize Mr. Cudney as a pathologically nasty Texas ranger or a meddling diplomat.... "Roger Cudney is the epitome of the bad gringo, a blending of all the worst American stereotypes," says David Wilt, who compiled the Biographical Dictionary of Mexican Film Performers.

Cudney also had parts in mainstream Hollywood films shot in Mexico, including a co-starring role opposite Charles Bronson in The Evil That Men Do, Total Recall, Rambo: First Blood Part II, the James Bond film Licence to Kill, Julia, Perdita Durango and Original Sin. He portrayed the part of the United States Ambassador to Mexico in La dictadura perfecta.

== Personal life ==
Cudney was married to Eloisa Bueno, with three sons and one daughter. He was a longtime resident of Interlomas.

=== Death ===
Cudney died in Mexico City on July 5, 2021, of a heart attack following a car accident. His final film, The Containment, was released three years after his death in 2024.

== Filmography ==
=== Film ===
Year	Title	Role	Notes
1971	Eye for an Eye		Original title: El sabor de la venganza
1972	Ni solteros, ni casados		Spanish-language comedy
1972	The Revengers	Sheriff	Uncredited
1972	Slaughter	Gio	blaxploitation film starring Jim Brown
1975	Mary, Mary, Bloody Mary	Howard Miller	
1975	Lucky Lady	Hotel clerk	
1976	Swashbuckler	Guard	Uncredited
1976	El karateca azteca	Calvin	Spanish-language comedy
1977	Mina, Wind of Freedom	Colonel Young	Original title: "Mina, viento de libertad"; biography of Martín Javier Mina y Larrea
1977	Los hermanos del viento	Conductor	
1978	Roots of Blood	Factory Foreman	Original title: "Raíces de sangre"
1978	The Recourse to the Method	Army captain	Original title: "El recurso del método"
1978	Cananea	Ted Nolan	cinematic account of the Cananea strike of 1906
1978	The Bees	Blankeley	
1979	Border Cop	Slaughterhouse foreman	
1980	Cattle Annie and Little Britches	Capps	
1980	El hombre sin miedo	Mr. Brown	
1981	357 Magnum	Mario Frasca	
1981	Priest of Love		British biographical film about D. H. Lawrence
1982	Red Bells		Soviet Union-Italy-Mexico co-production
1982	Amityville II: The Possession	Prosecutor	Uncredited
1982	Quell and Co.	Ames	Original title: "Showdown at Eagle Gap"
1983	Triumphs of a Man Called Horse	Durand	
1984	The Evil That Men Do	Cannell	
1984	Escuela de placer		
1984	El mexicano feo		
1984	Toy Soldiers	Mr. Green	
1984	Hombres de acción		
1984	El traficante II		
1984	El carro de la muerte		
1984	Perros salvajes		Alternate title: "Wild Dogs"
1985	The Falcon and the Snowman	FBI agent	Uncredited
1985	Rambo: First Blood Part II	Chief Radio Operator	Uncredited
1985	La fuga del rojo	Callahan	
1985	Remo Williams: The Adventure Begins	Captain Young	
1986	Miracles	Captain Irvine	
1986	La venganza del rojo	Callahan	
1986	Ghost Fever	TV announcer	US-Mexico co-production
1986	Murieron a la mitad del rio	Mr. Smith	
1987	A Walk on the Moon		
1987	Hot Pursuit	Bartender	
1987	Ratas de la frontera		
1988	Con el odio en la piel		
1988	Deathstalker and the Warriors from Hell	Inaros	Alternate title: "Deathstalker III: The Warriors from Hell"
1988	Con el niño atravesado	Banker	
1988	Licence to Kill	Wavekrest Captain	16th film in the James Bond series
1990	Barbarian Queen II: The Empress Strikes Back	Hofrax	Direct-to-video
1990	Total Recall	Agent	6th highest-grossing film of 1990
1990	El fiscal de hierro 2: La venganza de Ramona		
1990	Demons of the Desert		Original title: "Los demonios del desierto"
1992	Muerte infernal	Dr. Emmanuel Richter	Alternate title: "Hell doll"
1994	Juana la Cubana		biography of Juana Bacallao
1994	Immortal Combat	Stan	Alternate title: "Resort to Kill"
1995	Una papa sin catsup		
1996	The Arrival	JPL Official	
1997	Perdita Durango	Herbert	
1997	Henequen	Ranch foreman	depiction of Korean henequen field laborers in Mexico circa 1905
1999	Santitos	Scott Haines	
1999	One Man's Hero	Col. William S. Harney	Dramatization of John Riley and the Saint Patrick's Battalion: Irish Catholic immigrants who deserted the mostly Protestant U.S. Army to join the mostly Catholic Mexican side during Mexican–American War.
2000	Baño de sangre	El General	Direct-to-video
2001	Blind Heat	Bautista	US-Mexico co-production
2001	Original Sin	Ship's Captain	
2004	Puerto Vallarta Squeeze	Bill the Bartender	Adaptation of novel by Robert James Waller
2004	The Pearl		based on novella by John Steinbeck
2006	The Champion	Minuteman	Original title: "Los pajarracos"
2006	Fast Food Nation	Terry	loosely based on Eric Schlosser's bestselling 2001 non-fiction book of the same name
2007	Propiedad Ajena	Roger Cassey	
2007	The Wailer 2	Professor Tomas McBride	Original title: "La Llorona 2"
2008	Julia	Frank	US/France/Mexico/Belgium co-production
2011	La Noche del Pirata	Paddy O'Brien	
2012	Soul Walker	Donato	
2012	Z-Baw	Great Chancellor	English version, Voice
2012	For Greater Glory	US Secretary of State Frank B. Kellogg	alternate titles: "Cristiada" and "Outlaws"
2012	Portion	Art	
2012	The Fantastic World of Juan Orol	Don Guillermo	
2013	Instructions Not Included	Abogado de Julie	Original title: "No se aceptan devoluciones"
2014	Cesar Chavez	Grower	
2014	The Perfect Dictatorship	Embajador USA	Original title: "La dictadura perfecta"
2014	Cantinflas	John	film biography of popular Mexican actor/icon Cantinflas
2014	Happy Times	Dr. Guillermo Murray	Original title: "Tiempos Felices"
2016	Hysteria	Stephen	
2017	Diario de un Mirrey	Don Steven Rice	
2018	Más sabe el Diablo por viejo	Stuart Young	
2019	Mentada de padre	Williams	

=== Television ===
Year	Title	Role	Notes
1971	The Virginian	Cowboy	Episode: "Flight from Memory"
1975	McCloud	Drake	Episode: "Lady on the Run"
1975	Nevada Smith	Perkins	TV Movie
1975	A Home of Our Own	Oil executive	TV movie biography of Father William Wasson
1977	The Rhinemann Exchange	party guest	3-part miniseries
1980	Mein Freund Winnetou		Episode: "Duels"
1980	Secreto de confesión	Burton	3 episodes
1981	Computercide	Robbins	TV Movie
1982	Falcon's Gold	Hathaway	TV Movie
1986	On Wings of Eagles	General Jerome O'Malley	2-part miniseries
1986	Oceans of Fire	Tool pusher	TV Movie
1987	Auf Achse	Theo Moll	Episode: "Kampfstiere nach Santa Maria"
1987	Rosa salvaje	Botones en el hotel de Nueva York	1 episode
1988	The Aeronauts		Original title: "Les nouveaux chevaliers du ciel"
1988	Crime Story	Jenkins	2 episodes
1988	The Second Voyage of the Mimi	Harvey Westerman	PBS-broadcast educational series; 12 episodes
1989	Trying Times	Persival	Episode: "The Hit List"
1991	Tropical Heat	Ezra	Episode: "Tara, Tara, Tara"
1994	The Cisco Kid	Alcott	TV Movie
1994	The Burning Season: The Chico Mendes Story	Reporter	TV Movie
1997	La chacala	Professor Von Derek	5 episodes
1998	Soñadoras	Doctor	1 episode
1999	Acapulco H.E.A.T.	Arthur Cox	Episode: "Code Name: Death of a Friendship"
1999	Por tu amor	Doctor	1 episode
2000	Carita de ángel	Ryan	1 episode
2000	Por un beso	Dr. Newman	1 episode
2001	Warden of Red Rock	Prisoner	TV Movie
2001	In the Time of the Butterflies	Dominican Ambassador Manuel de Moya	TV film about lives of the activist Mirabal sisters
2001	Mujer, Casos de la Vida Real		1 episode
2001	Blameless Love/Sin pecado concebido	Dr. Reyes	4 episodes
2001	Amigas y rivales	Hombre con rifle	1 episode
2002	Fidel	Ambassador Butler	TV Movie, David Attwood's film about the Cuban revolution and political career of Fidel Castro
2002	King of Texas	Smithwick	William Shakespeare's King Lear placed in 19th century Republic of Texas
2004	Rubí	Stephen Howard	6 episodes
2004	American Family	Desert Driver	2 episodes
2004	Wooden Woman/Mujer de madera	Dr. Wilson	2 episodes
2005	La ley del silencio	Meyer	11 episodes
2006	La fea más bella	Manager	1 episode
2006	Vecinos	Director Canadiense	Episode: "Los Rivers en Canadá: Parte 1"
2007	Species: The Awakening	Leland	TV Movie
2007–2008	Palabra de mujer	Doctor Wilkins	5 episodes
2008–2009	Mañana es para siempre	U.S. Ambassador	7 episodes
2009	Juro Que Te Amo	Empresario	1 episode
2009	Hasta que el dinero nos separe	Doctor	2 episodes
2009	Los simuladores	Empresario	3 episodes
2009	El Pantera	Rich man	1 episode
2010	Llena de amor	Airport security guard	1 episode
2010	El octavo mandamiento	Doctor	1 episode
2011	La fuerza del destino	Mark	35 episodes
2011	Double Life/Dos hogares	Mister Daivis	15 episodes
2011	El encanto del águila	Paul Von Hintze	1 episode
2011	La que no podía amar	Vaquero texano	3 episodes
2012	Por ella soy Eva	Mr. Keaton	2 episodes
2012	Un refugio para el amor		3 episodes
2010–2012	Capadocia	James Medina	14 episodes
2014	Camelia la Texana	Dr. Fragger	4 episodes
2015	Hasta el fin del mundo	Mike Stone (Mister Sam)	5 episodes
2016	Sueño de amor	Andrew	12 episodes
2016	Por siempre Joan Sebastian	Doctor	miniseries - 1 episode
2016	40 y 20	Arnold	Episode: "Se renta departamento"
2017	Su nombre era Dolores, la Jenn que yo conocí	Mr. Perkins	Episode: "Sufriendo a solas"
2017	La doble vida de Estela Carrillo	Jonas Logan	20 episodes
2017	Run Coyote Run	Jefe de Migracion	Episode: "Un Lindo Gatito"
2018	Descontrol	Morrison	Episode: "Call Center"
2018	Hijas de la luna		3 episodes
2019	El corazón nunca se equivoca		2 episodes
2019	Swipe Night	Stranger	1 episode
