= Battle of Churubusco =

Battle of the Mexican–American War

Coordinates: 19.356°N 99.149°W

- Part of the Mexican–American War
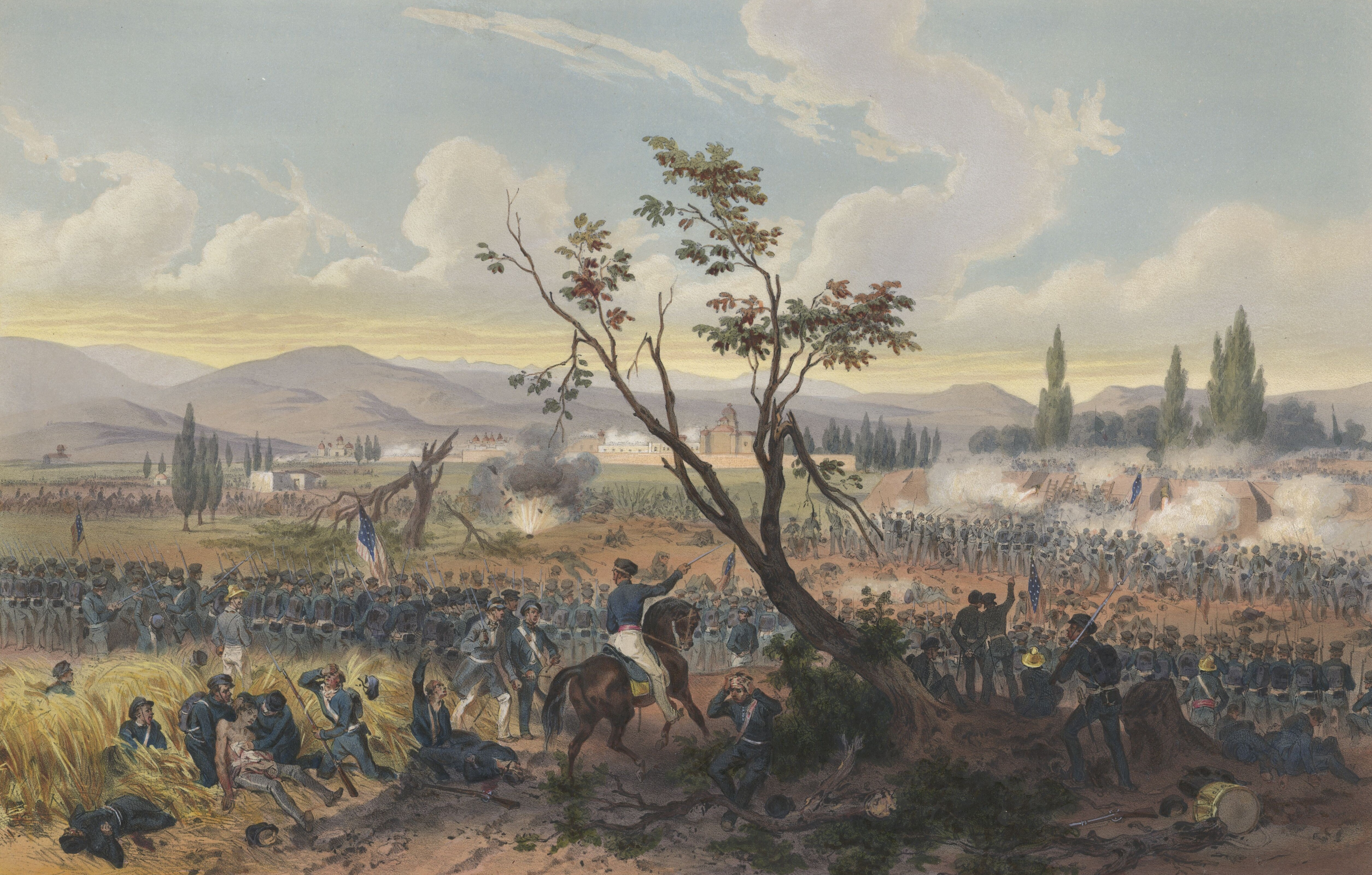
- Battle of Churubusco, by Carl Nebel
Date	August 20, 1847
Location	near Mexico City, Mexican Federal District
Result	American victory

Belligerents
United States	Mexico

Commanders and leaders
Winfield Scott	Antonio López de Santa Anna; Pedro Anaya; John O'Riley

Strength
8,497	3,800

Casualties and losses
139 killed 865 wounded 40 missing	263 killed 460 wounded 20 missing. 1,261 captured

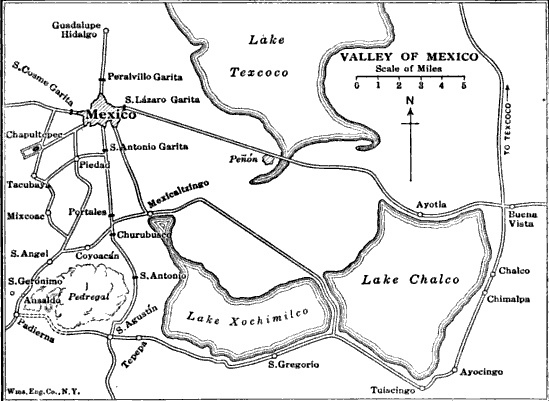
Environs south of Mexico City

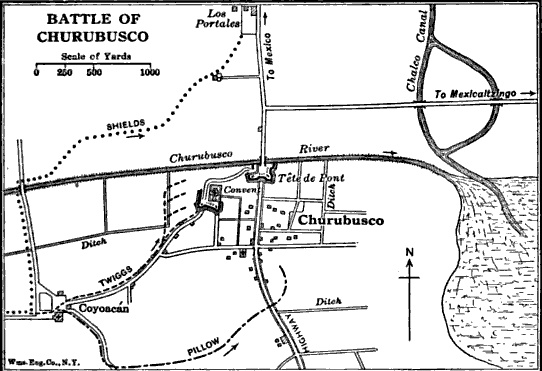
Churubusco

The Battle of Churubusco took place on August 20, 1847, while Santa Anna's army was in retreat from the Battle of Contreras during the Mexican–American War. It was the battle where the San Patricio Battalion, made up largely of US deserters, made their last stand against U.S. forces. The U.S. Army was victorious, outnumbering more than six-to-one the defending Mexican troops. After the battle, the U.S. Army was only 5 miles (8 km) away from Mexico City. Fifty men of Saint Patrick's Battalion were officially executed by the U.S. Army, all but two by hanging. Collectively, this was the largest mass execution in United States history.

== Background ==
Following their defeats at Contreras, Antonio López de Santa Anna ordered Major General Nicolás Bravo Rueda with the Army of the Center, to retreat from San Antonio to Churubusco. Santa Anna also ordered Major General Manuel Rincón to hold the Franciscan Convent of San Mateo in Churubusco, with earthworks and seven guns, and placed General Francisco Pérez at the tête de pont on the south bank of the Churubusco River. Two regiments were placed along the river, while the Bravo Battalions of the Mexico City National Guard and the San Patricio Battalion were arrayed at the convent. Santa Anna formed a reserve along the highway to the north.

== Battle ==
Scott sent David Twiggs and Gideon Johnson Pillow's Divisions from San Angel to Coyoacán, while he ordered William Jenkins Worth to turn the San Antonio position. Worth sent Colonel Newman S. Clarke's Brigade and Lieutenant Colonel Charles Ferguson Smith's Light Battalion across the Pedregal lava field to the west of San Antonio, while Colonel John Garland faced San Antonio on the south.

During retreat from San Antonio, the Mexican defenders (part of the 1st Line of Defense (or sometimes the "Army of the Center") with Colonel F. Villarreal and about 2,000 men: 700 of the "Hidalgo," 500 of the "Victoria" (Lieutenant Colonel P. Jorrin) National Guards Battalions, and 800 others: under Colonels A. Zerecero and J.G. Perdigón Garay), were struck in flank by Clarke's Brigade. Garland moved forward as the Mexicans withdrew from San Antonio and captured a General and four guns.

Scott ordered an attack on the convent. In addition to the stone walls of the convent, the defenses included a series of incomplete trenches the Mexicans had begun digging prior to the attack. Some elements of the Tlapa and Lagos Battalions arrived as reinforcements. Three cannon were placed on the right; two in the center; and the remaining two on the left. Independencia was assigned to defend the upper walls, the right flank leading to the bridge, the unfortified south and north sides, and two adobe huts further forward on the battlefield. The Bravos and the San Patricios were stationed on the left, behind barricades. In support along the Rio Churubusco was the Pérez Brigade: 2,500 men (11th Line, 1st, 3d & 4th Light Infantry Regiments).

Worth's division took on the tête de pont, while Twiggs took on the convent. Rincón's gunners were able to force Taylor's battery to withdraw, and Perez's defense on the tête de pont twice repulsed Major Benjamin Louis Eulalie de Bonneville's 6th Infantry charge. The attack by Franklin Pierce and James Shields, crossing the river on the Coyoacan-Mixcoac road in an attempt to cut off the Mexican retreat, was also stopped. However, Worth turned the Mexican left and crossed the river, while the 8th and 5th Infantry took the tête de pont. Captain Duncan then set up a battery to attack the convent.

Two of the Mexican cannons had melted and a third had fallen from its mount. Lieutenant Colonel Francisco Peñúñuri of Independencia led a handful of men in a bayonet charge and was defeated. He died in battle. Captain Luis Martínez de Castro, who had accompanied him, died of gangrene on August 27, 1847. Officers from the Bravos attempted to raise the white flag over the convent walls on three occasions but were prevented from doing so by members of the San Patricios, who had resolved to fight to the end and not let the Americans capture their flag. The San Patricio Battalion was ultimately captured and court-martialed for desertion, including its leader, John Patrick Riley. U.S. Captain James Milton Smith finally stopped the fighting by putting up a white handkerchief.

== Aftermath ==
The Americans captured 192 prisoners and three pieces of artillery at the tête de pont. They captured 1,259 prisoners, including three Generals and the San Patricios leader Lieutenant Colonel Francisco Rosenda Moreno, plus seven pieces of artillery at the convent. They captured another 380 prisoners further up the road. Winfield Scott estimated the Mexican casualties on August 19–20, at Contreras and Churubusco, at 4,297 killed and wounded; in addition to 2,637 taken prisoner.

Seventy-two men of the San Patricios Battalion were court-martialed by the United States Army as deserters. Two separate courts martial were held, one at Tacubaya on 23 August, and another at San Ángel on 26 August. Fifty were sentenced to hang, having deserted after war had been declared. Those who had deserted earlier received 50 lashes.

When General Anaya was asked by General Twiggs to surrender his ammunition after the end of the battle, he replied, "If I had any ammunition, you would not be here".

Scott did not continue the pursuit into Mexico City, "...willing to leave something to this republic... I halted our victorious corps at the gates of the city."

A Brigade of volunteers from New York was billeted to the convent, remaining there until September 7.

== Gallery ==
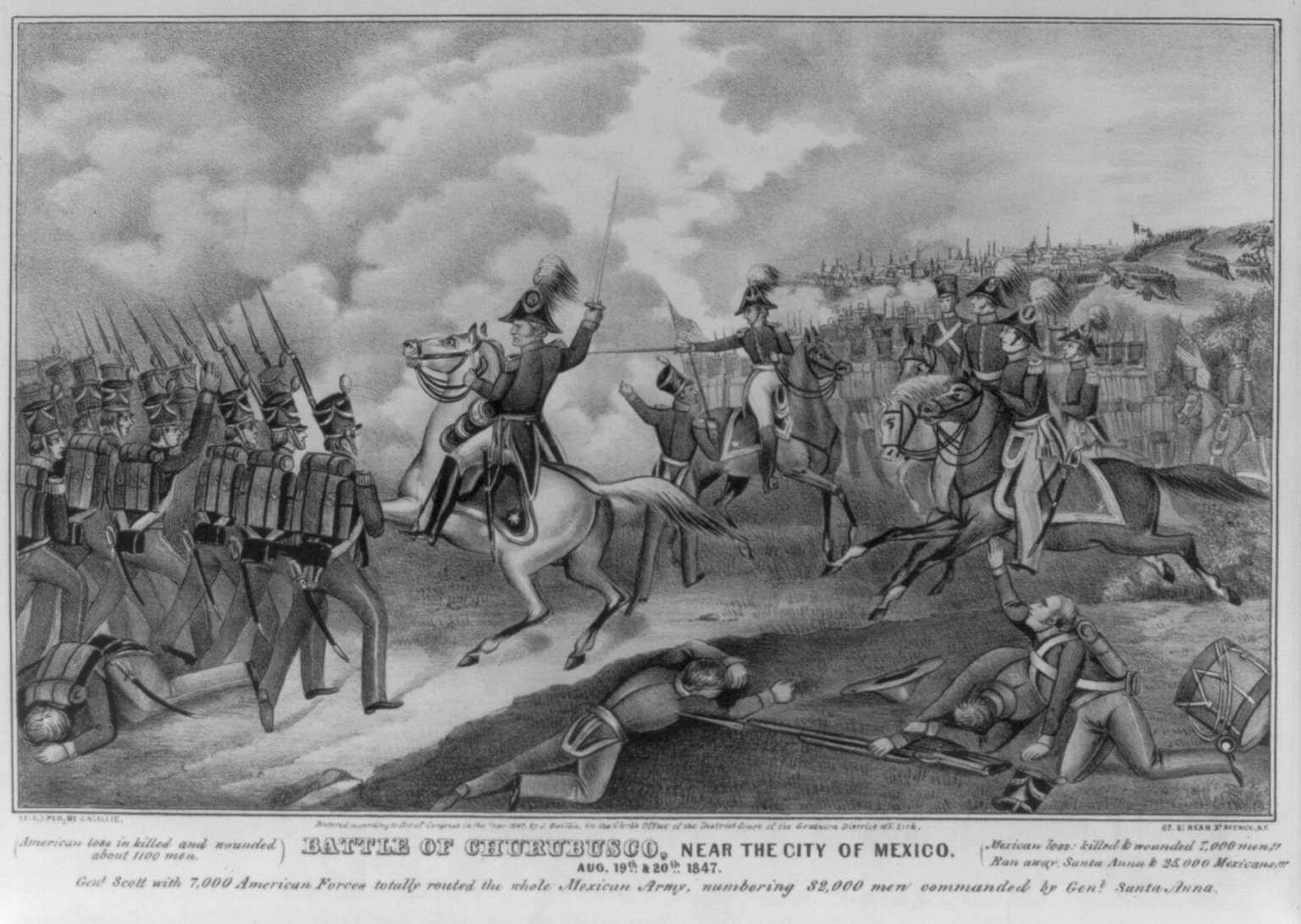
Battle of Churubusco

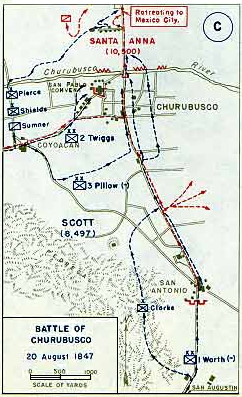
Map of the battle of Churubusco

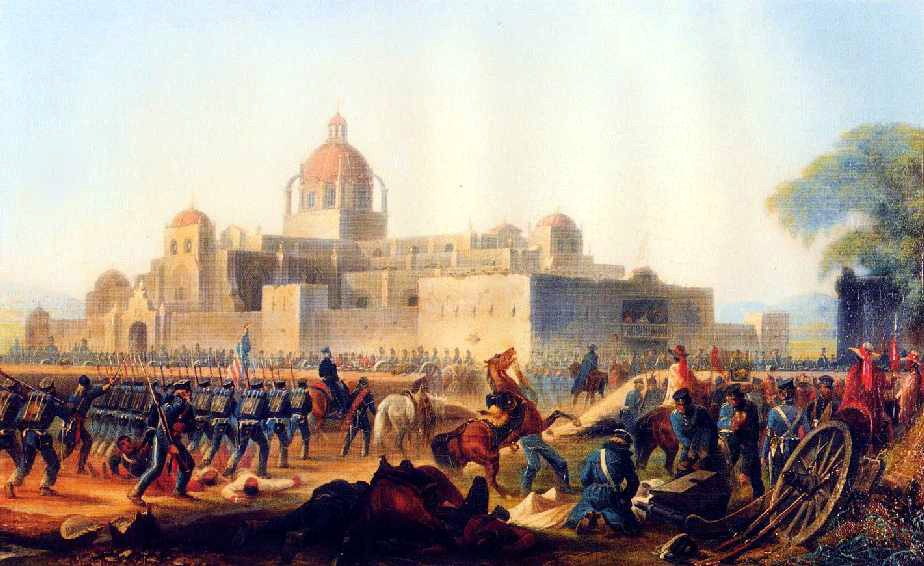
Churubusco's monastery at the height of the 1847 Battle of Churubusco, painted by James Walker

== In popular culture ==
Parts of the battle were portrayed in the 1985 ABC mini-series North and South, based on a trilogy of novels of the same name by John Jakes, as well as the film One Man's Hero (1999).

== See also ==
- Bibliography of the Mexican American War
- Bibliography of James K. Polk

== Sources ==
- Ramsey, Albert C. The other side; or, Notes for the history of the war between Mexico and the United States, New York: John Wiley 161 Broadway and 13 Paternoster Row, London, 1850
- Balbontin, Manuel " Recuerdos de la invasion norte-americana, 1846-1848.
- Annual Reports 1894, War Department lists trophy guns as:1- 16 pounder bronze, 4- 8 pounders, 4- 6 pounders and 3- 4 pounders.
