= John Riley (soldier) =

Irish soldier

John O'Riley
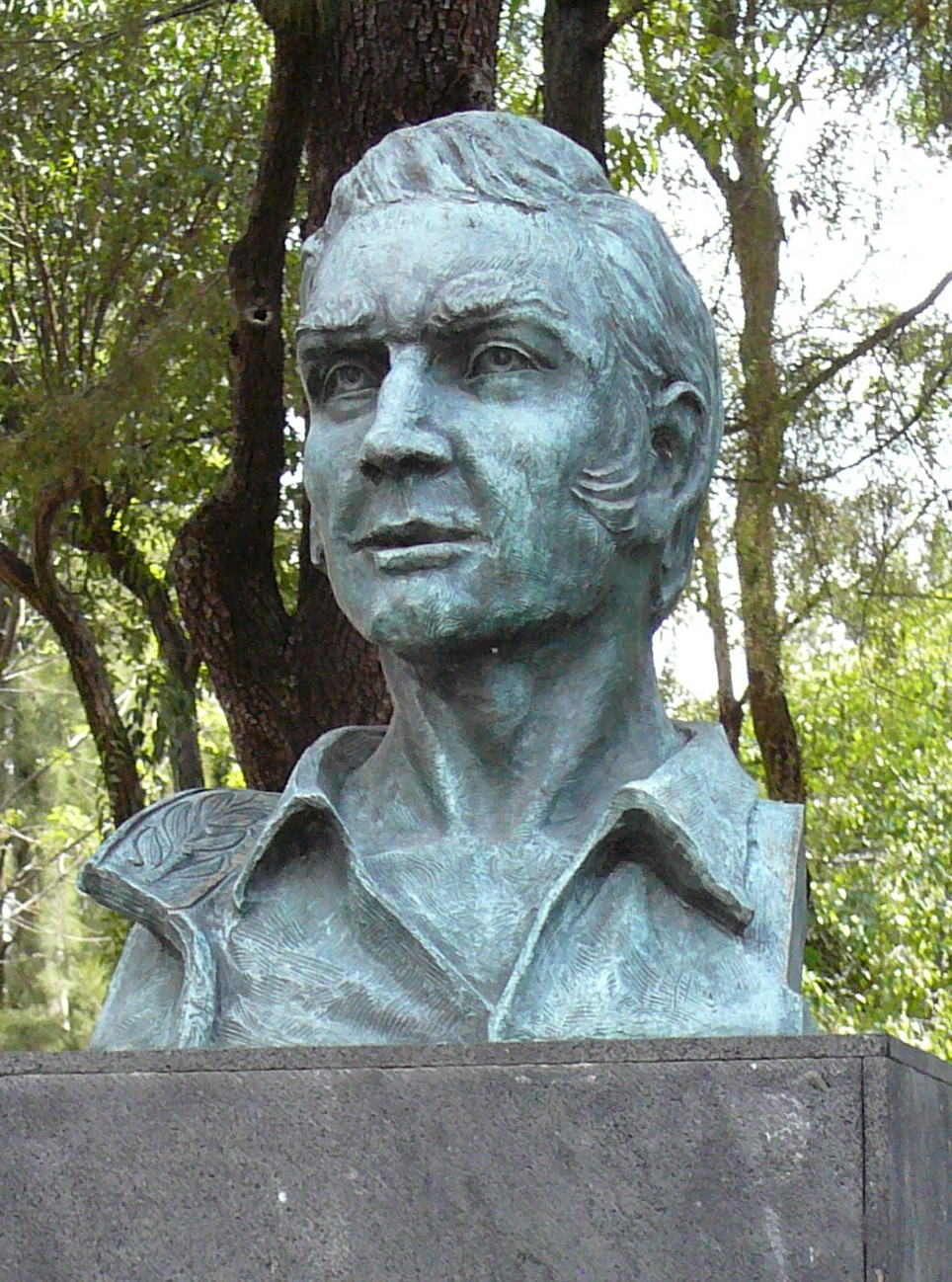
- Born: c. 1817; Clifden, Ireland
- Died: 10 October 1850 (aged 33); Veracruz, Mexico
- Military career
- Allegiance: United Kingdom; United States; Mexico
- Branch: British Army; United States Army; Mexican Army
- Service years: 1835–1840 (UK); 1845–1846 (US); 1846–1850 (Mexico)
- Rank: Sergeant (UK); Private (US); Brevet Major (Mexico)
- Commands: Batallón de San Patricio
- Conflicts: Mexican–American War; Siege of Fort Texas; Battle of Monterrey; Battle of Buena Vista; Battle of Cerro Gordo; Battle of Churubusco

John Patrick Riley (also known as John Patrick O'Riley; Irish: Seán Pádraig Ó Raghallaigh) (c. 1817 – 10 October 1850) was an Irish soldier in the British Army who emigrated to the United States and subsequently enlisted in the United States Army. During the Mexican–American War of 1846–1848, Riley led several other defectors in the ranks who defected to Mexico, where they formed the Saint Patrick's Battalion in the Mexican Army.

== Early life ==
Riley was born in Clifden, County Galway, Ireland, around 1817–1818; his original Irish name was Seán Ó Raghailligh. He served with the British Army before emigrating to Canada. Connemara and other rural regions suffered greatly during the Great Famine, and millions of people emigrated by ship from Ireland to Canada and the United States to survive. Riley was among them.

== Immigration to the United States ==
Soon after his arrival in the United States in Michigan, Riley enlisted in the US Army. Many immigrants were recruited in the 1840s; some served to earn some money, having fled famine and severe poverty in their home countries.

Prior to his desertion, Riley served in Company K of the 5th US Infantry Regiment. Riley and Patrick Dalton deserted in 1846, just before the beginning of the Mexican-American War. Both men subsequently joined the Mexican Army, where they eventually formed the Batallón de San Patricio, or Saint Patrick's Battalion. It was made up of mostly Irish and German immigrants, although it included Catholics from many other countries as well. The unit fought in several battles during the Mexican-American War. Eventually, the battalion was forced to make a last stand at the Battle of Churubusco, which took place on the outskirts of Mexico City. Approximately 35 members of the battalion were killed, while another 85 were captured by US forces, including Riley; the remnants of the unit, numbering approximately 85 men, managed to escape alongside the retreating Mexican forces. Some of the surviving soldiers took part in the Battle for Mexico City, though they were too few to constitute a cohesive military unit. The battalion itself was formally disbanded in August 1848, six months after the end of the war, allegedly due to one of the unit's officers being implicated in an attempted military coup.

Because Riley had deserted before the US declared war against Mexico, he was not sentenced to death following his conviction at the court martial held in Mexico City in 1847. He testified to deserting because of discrimination against and mistreatment of Irish Catholics in the US Army, as well as anti-Catholicism which he had encountered in the United States. While he escaped the mass hanging of around 50 other captured members of the Saint Patrick's Battalion, Riley was branded on his cheek with the letter "D" for deserter.

== Post-court martial ==
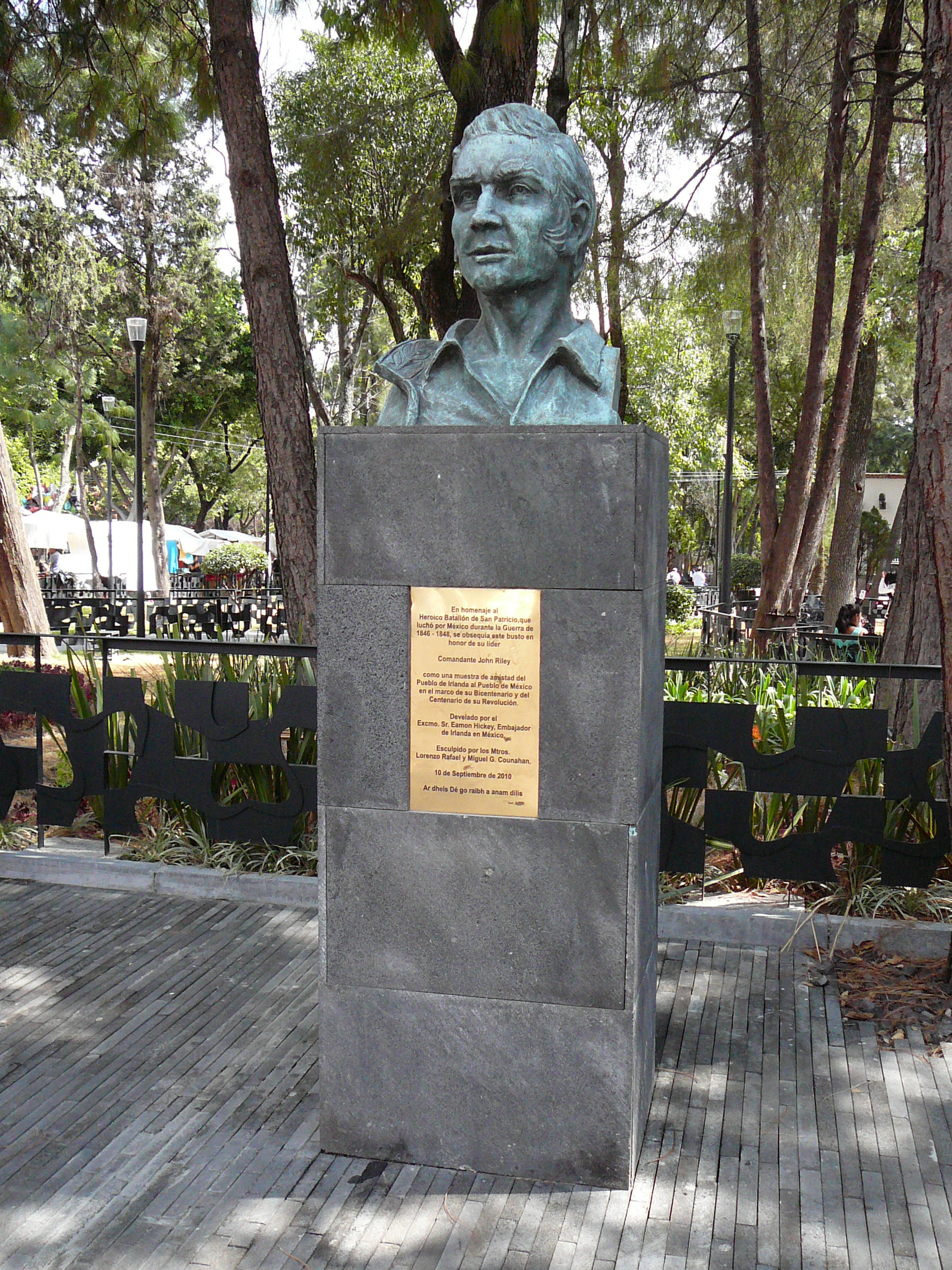
John Riley bust on pedestal, Plaza San Jacinto, San Ángel, Mexico City

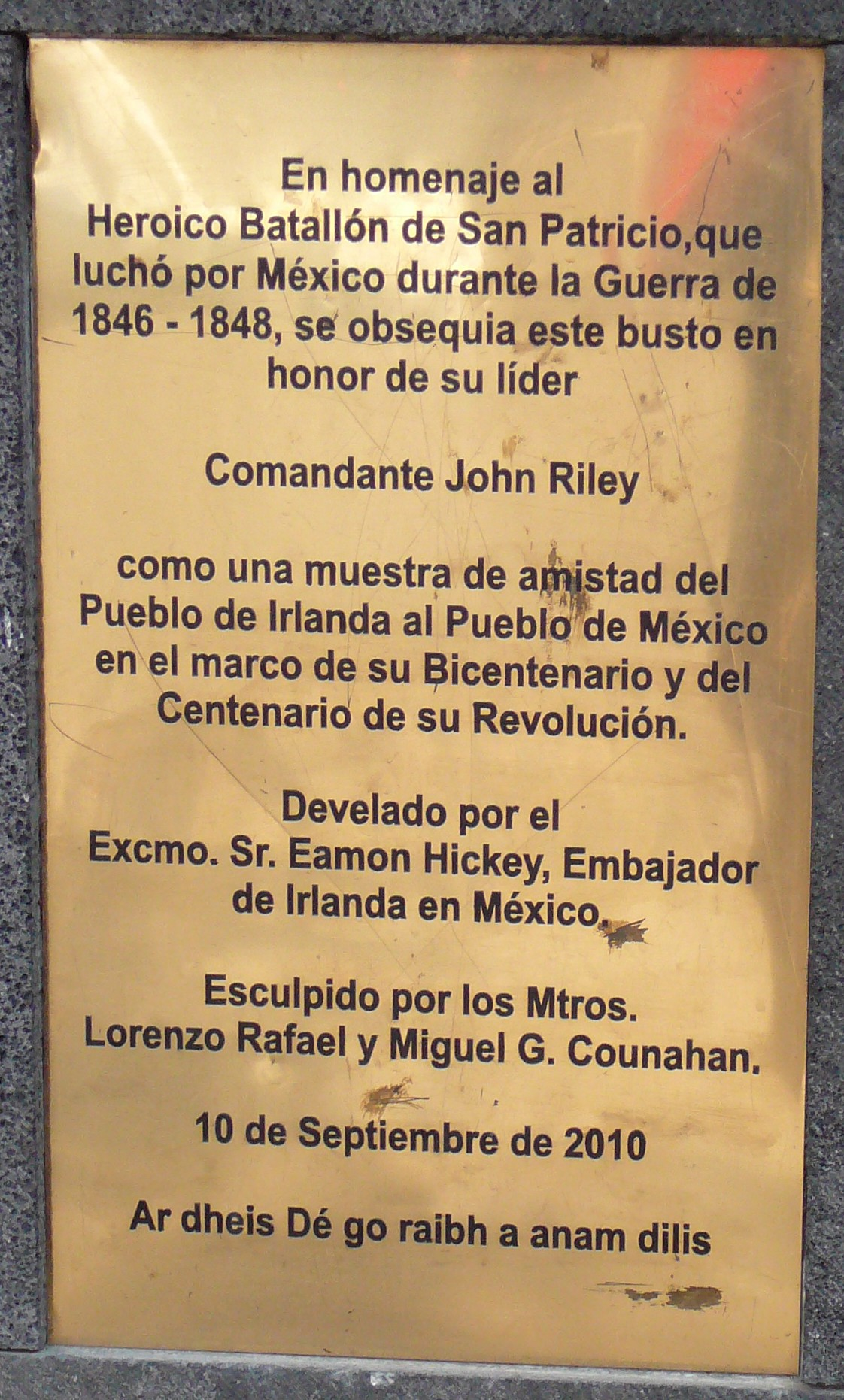
John Riley plaque on pedestal, Plaza San Jacinto, Mexico City

Following his conviction and branding, Riley was released and eventually rejoined the Mexican forces. Reportedly, he grew his hair to conceal the scars on his face. He continued to serve with the regular Mexican Army after the end of the war, being confirmed in the rank of "Permanent Major". Stationed in Veracruz, he was retired on 14 August 1850 on medical grounds after suffering from yellow fever.

== Controversy over death ==
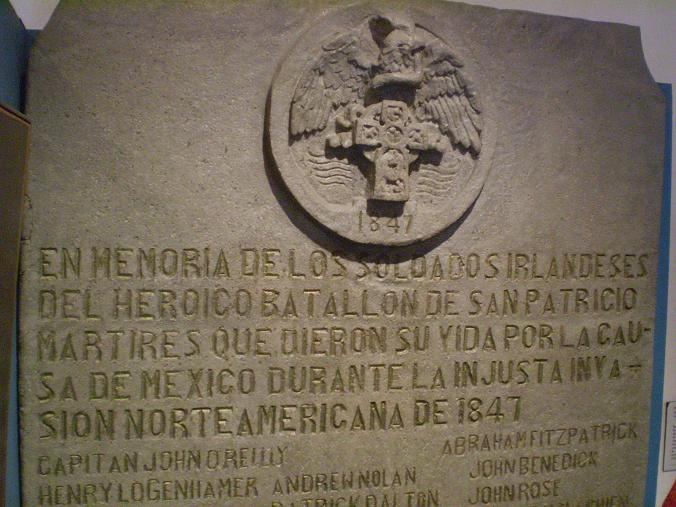
Inscription to the memory of the St Patrick's Battalion – Museo de las Intervenciones, Coyoacán, DF, Mexico

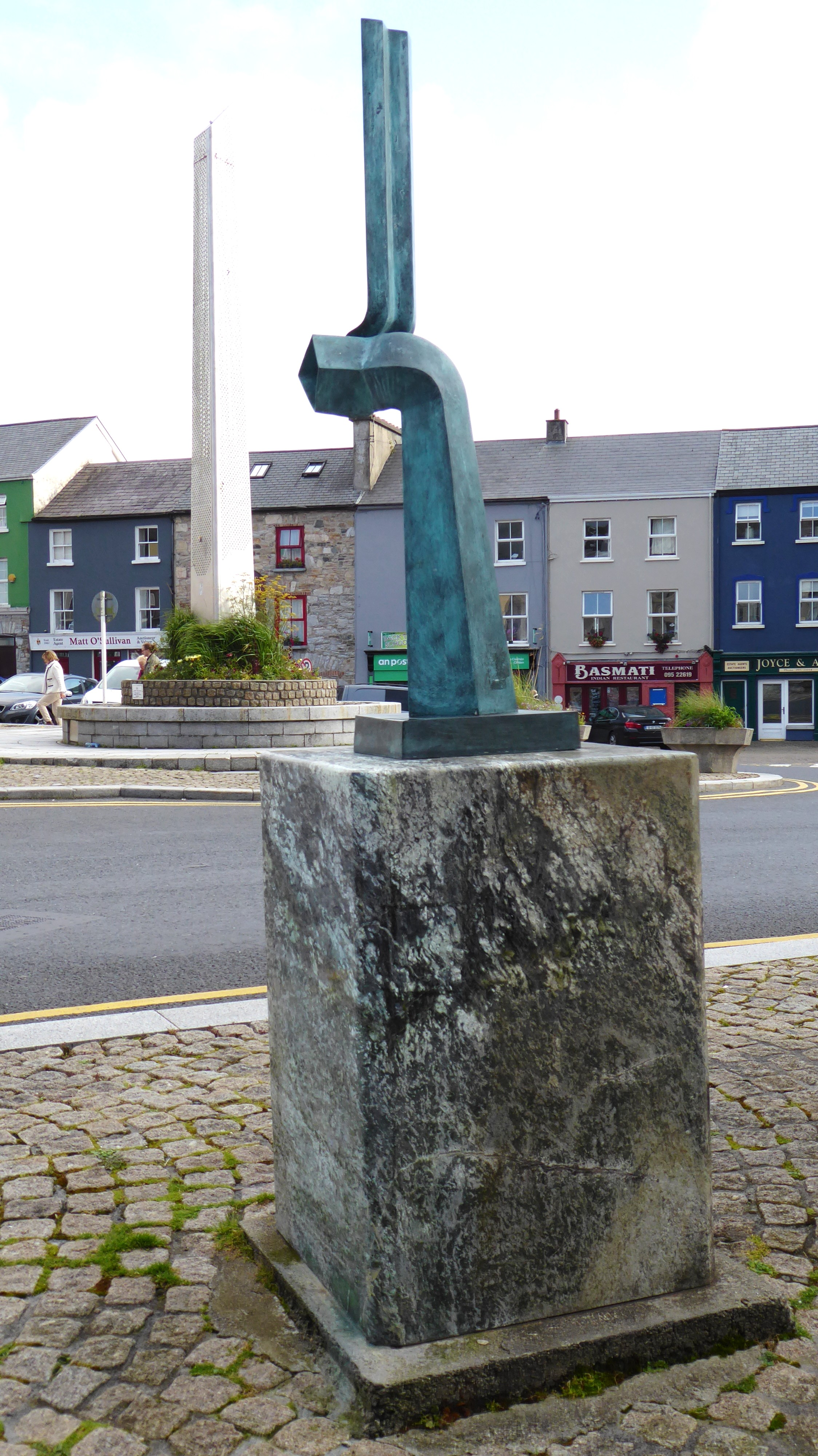
Sculpture in Clifden; the Riley plaque with misspelled surname missing

Robert Ryal Miller, author of Shamrock and Sword (1989), found what appeared to be Riley's death certificate in book of burials No. 6, entry 133, of the then parish (now cathedral) of Veracruz. Like Riley's Mexican army records, it refers to the name "Juan Reley". It reads:

In the H. [Heroic] city of Veracruz, on the thirty first of August of eighteen hundred and fifty, I, Don Ignacio Jose Jimenez, curate of the parish church of the Assumption of Our Lady, buried in the general cemetery the body of Juan Reley, of forty five years of age, a native of Ireland, unmarried, parents unknown; died as a result of drunkenness, without sacraments, and I signed it.

However, while Miller at the time believed this was in fact the death certificate of the San Patricio commander, both his own research and that of subsequent scholars suggest that he was mistaken. Miller died in 2004 before he could write an addendum. Some arguments which cast doubt on Miller's original presumption include:

- The U.S. Army enlistment records from September 1845 indicate that John Riley was born in Clifden, County Galway, and was twenty-eight years old at the time of his enlistment. That would mean he had been born between 1817 and 1818 so would have been 33 years old in 1850. The Juan Riley buried in the churchyard was 45 years old according to the curate. If this was accurate, it could not have been the leader of the San Patricios.
- Major Riley was a teetotaler and his sobriety, leadership, ambition and example was commented on by several people who knew him. Even those who condemned his desertion were aware of these qualities. A death from drunkenness would have been highly unlikely.
- Riley had been discharged on 14 August with medals for heroism, with uniforms, with a well-equipped horse and tack, with over $800 in retirement pay (the equivalent of $20,000 today). The death certificate for the indigent "Juan Riley" was dated 31 August, just seventeen days later.
- No robbery was mentioned in any newspaper in Veracruz during this period, nor were there any police reports of big spenders. In such a small town they would have been noticed. Thus is highly unlikely that the well-known and highly decorated major, a redhead over six feet tall and handsome except for his scars, would have been suddenly impoverished and buried (as "Juan Riley") without last rites in the general cemetery just weeks after his discharge.

Research conducted in September 2012 in Clifden, County Galway, failed to turn up any John Riley who would fit into the age described on the death certificate. Peter F. Stephens, author of The Rogue's March: John Riley and the St. Patrick's Battalion, agrees that the only Rileys which fit the profile had to be born in County Galway in 1818, a year that marks the birth of two male children to two different families each of whom were named John Riley, both of which were duly recorded by the Catholic Church records in Clifden, County Galway.

== Legacy ==
In his honour, and to commemorate Saint Patrick's Battalion, a bronze sculpture was erected in his birthplace of Clifden, Ireland, as a gift from the Mexican government.

== In popular culture ==
- In the 1999 film One Man's Hero, Riley is portrayed by Tom Berenger.
- The half-hour documentary Saol John Riley (The Life of John Riley) was broadcast on the television channel TG4 in 2011.
- The song "Saint Patrick Battalion" originally released by David Rovics in 2001 tells a history of the Saint Patrick battalion narrated through the perspective of Riley.
