= John Murphy (Saint Patrick's Battalion) =

John Murphy, Irish soldier, fl. 1846-48.

Murphy was a native of County Mayo, Ireland who later served with the Saint Patrick's Battalion. He had deserted the U.S. army 8th Infantry on 17 May 1846, and joined the Mexican army. Because the United States had not yet declared war on Mexico at the time of Murphy's desertion, he could not be hung for his actions. Murphy, along with several other members of the battalion received fifty lashes and were branded with the letter D for "deserter" on the right hip or on the cheeks of their faces. He was held captive by the US army until the war concluded. Upon his release from prison, he received his pay from the Mexican government in May 1848, and settled in Mexico. He is ancestor to the Murphy-Martinez family of Guadalajara, and one of the few documented members of the battalion to have verified descendants in present-day Mexico.The economist Blanca Morales Murphy, wife of the Mexican Secretary of Finance Gustavo Petricioli, is also a direct descendant.
