= One Man's Hero =

1999 film by Lance Hool

- DVD cover
- Directed by: Lance Hool
- Written by: Milton S. Gelman
- Produced by: Conrad Hool; Lance Hool; William J. MacDonald
- Starring: Tom Berenger; Joaquim de Almeida; Daniela Romo; Patrick Bergin
- Cinematography: João Fernandes
- Edited by: Mark Conte
- Music by: Ernest Troost
- Production company: Hool/Macdonald Productions
- Distributed by: Orion Classics (U.S.); The Kushner-Locke Company (overseas)
- Release date: September 24, 1999
- Running time: 123 minutes
- Countries: United States; Mexico; Spain
- Language: English

One Man's Hero is a 1999 historical war drama film directed and produced by Lance Hool and starring Tom Berenger, Joaquim de Almeida, Daniela Romo, and Patrick Bergin. It dramatizes the true story of John Riley and the Saint Patrick's Battalion, a group of Irish Catholic immigrants who desert the mostly Protestant U.S. Army to join the Catholic Mexican army during the Mexican–American War of 1846 to 1848.

The film has the distinction of being the last film released by Orion Pictures' arthouse division Orion Classics, as well as being the last Orion Pictures film, until 2013's Grace Unplugged, when Metro-Goldwyn-Mayer revived the Orion Pictures brand. Shooting occurred in 1997, the same year that Orion Pictures was absorbed into Metro-Goldwyn-Mayer.

== Plot ==
Winfield Scott, Chief Commanding Officer of the U.S. Army, orders that 16 Irish immigrant soldiers be illegally whipped for "desertion" after they are caught entering Mexico to attend Catholic religious services. Sgt. John Riley frees his men at gunpoint and leads them towards Veracruz only to be violently captured by Juan Cortina as enemies of Mexico. Riley, wounded in his thigh, is nursed by Cortina's woman Marta. News arrives that the U.S. and Mexico are now at war. Riley volunteers himself and his men to fight for the Mexican armed forces in exchange for passage back to Ireland. Bolstered by other Irish deserters fleeing anti-Catholic persecution, he forms the Saint Patrick's Battalion.

After several major engagements, during which Riley and his unit distinguish themselves by exploiting their knowledge of American tactics, a cease-fire is reached. Meanwhile, the U.S. Senate is threatening to impeach President Polk as public opinion increasingly turns against what is perceived as an unjust war. The cease-fire is soon violated and hostilities resume. Major Gen. Zachary Taylor is ordered by Scott to deal with Riley, who is seen as both a traitor and an embarrassment to the U.S. Army.

As it becomes increasingly evident that Mexico will be defeated, Riley and his men face the harsh reality that they will likely be put to death for desertion. They willingly stay behind to hold off American forces so the Mexican army can escape, a heroic act that leaves most of them dead. Scott refuses an attempt by the Mexican government, represented by Col. Nexor, to recognize the survivors as prisoners of war as well as Mexican citizens; protests have come in from all the nations of the world denouncing their punishment as barbaric and an utter contradiction of the principles of the American Revolution. Scott refuses to hear any appeals, and at court-martial sentences the condemned to be hanged in the direction of Chapultepec Castle so that they may witness the final defeat of the Mexicans.

On the day of their execution, in sight of the men on the scaffold, Riley is lashed with a cat-o-nine-tails fifty times. He is then forcibly branded with a "D" (for deserter) and made to watch the executions. He proudly sees them defy their captors and refuse to beg for mercy as the sentences are carried out. Sent to be worked to death in a stone quarry for military prisoners, Riley is told by his former U.S. commander that he has been freed, to which he responds, "I have always been free". Returning to Mexico, he reunites with Cortina and Marta, and departs with Marta to make a new life in the wilderness. The epilogue notes with irony that it was Taylor, not Scott, who was elected president after the Mexican war.

== Cast ==
- Tom Berenger as John Riley
- Joaquim de Almeida as Juan Cortina
- Daniela Romo as Marta
- Mark Moses as Colonel Benton Lacy
- Stuart Graham as Corporal Kenneally
- Gregg Fitzgerald as Paddy Noonan
- Don Wycherley as Brian Athlone
- Wolf Muser as Corporal Schultz
- Luke Hayden as Seamus McDougherty
- Ilia Volok as Daniel Grzbalski
- Patrick Bergin as General Winfield Scott
- James Gammon as General Zachary Taylor
- Carlos Carrasco as Dominguez
- Stephen Tobolowsky as Captain Gaine
- Dermot Martin as Seamus Fitzgerald
- Jason Hool as Peter O'Neil
- Gary Hershberger as Eamonn Daly
- Steve Leone as John Daly
- Jorge Bosso as Col. Maximo Nexor
- Luis Lorenzo as Father Varga
- Vanessa Bauche as Flor
- Rodolfo de Anda as Gen. Pedro de Ampudia
- Roger Cudney as Col. William S. Harney

Prince Albert of Monaco, using the stage name of Kelly (his mother's maiden name), had a cameo appearance in the movie. He has a connection to Mexico through his grandfather, Prince Pierre, Duke of Valentinois, whose mother, Susana María de la Torre y Mier was a member of the Mexican nobility.

== Reception ==
=== Critical response ===
Rotten Tomatoes, a review aggregator, reports that 38% of eight surveyed critics gave the film a positive review.

=== Awards and nominations ===
| Institution | Year | Category | Nominee | Result | Ref. |
|---|---|---|---|---|---|
| ALMA Award | 2000 | Outstanding Director of a Feature Film | Lance Hool | Nominated | |
| Political Film Society Awards | 1999 | Exposé | One Man's Hero | Nominated | |
| Political Film Society Awards | 1999 | Human Rights | One Man's Hero | Nominated | |
| Political Film Society Awards | 1999 | Peace | One Man's Hero | Nominated | |
