= Battle of Cerro Gordo =

1847 battle of the Mexican–American War

- Part of the Mexican–American War
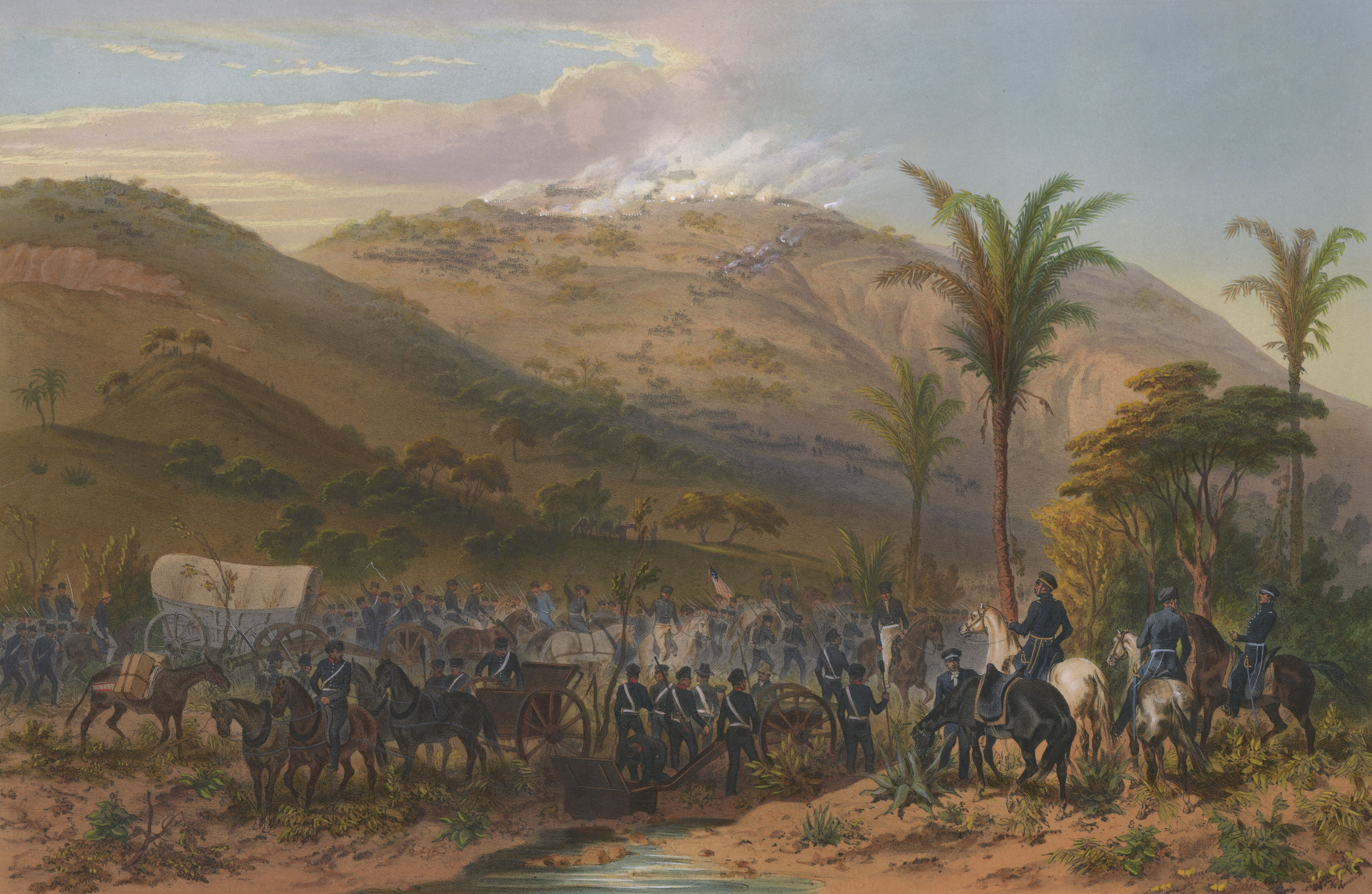
- 1851 illustration of the battle by Carl Nebel
Date	April 18, 1847
Location	near Xalapa, Veracruz, Mexico 19.429°N 96.688°W
Result	American victory

Belligerents
United States	Mexico

Commanders and leaders
(United States) Winfield Scott (United States) David E. Twiggs (United States) William S. Harney (United States) James Shields (WIA)	Santa Anna; Ciriaco Vásquez †; Ángel Trías

Strength
8,700 – 12,000	9,000 – 12,000

Casualties and losses
63 killed 368 wounded	1,000+ killed and wounded 3,036 captured
- Location within Mexico

The Battle of Cerro Gordo, or Battle of Sierra Gordo, was an engagement in the Mexican–American War on April 18, 1847. The battle saw Winfield Scott's United States troops outflank Antonio López de Santa Anna's larger Mexican army, driving it from a strong defensive position.

== Background ==
After United States forces captured the port of Veracruz on March 29, 1847, General Winfield Scott advanced towards Mexico City on April 2 by crossing the Rio Antigua. General Antonio López de Santa Anna, commanding Mexican forces in the area, had prepared fortifications at Cerro Gordo, near Xalapa, with more than 8,700 soldiers in a fortified defile, dominated by El Telegrafo. These included several batteries under the command of brigadier generals Luis Pinzon, Jose Maria Jararo, and Romulo Diaz de la Vega. Scott's leading division, commanded by David E. Twiggs, reached the Cerro Gordo Pass on April 12.

== Battle ==
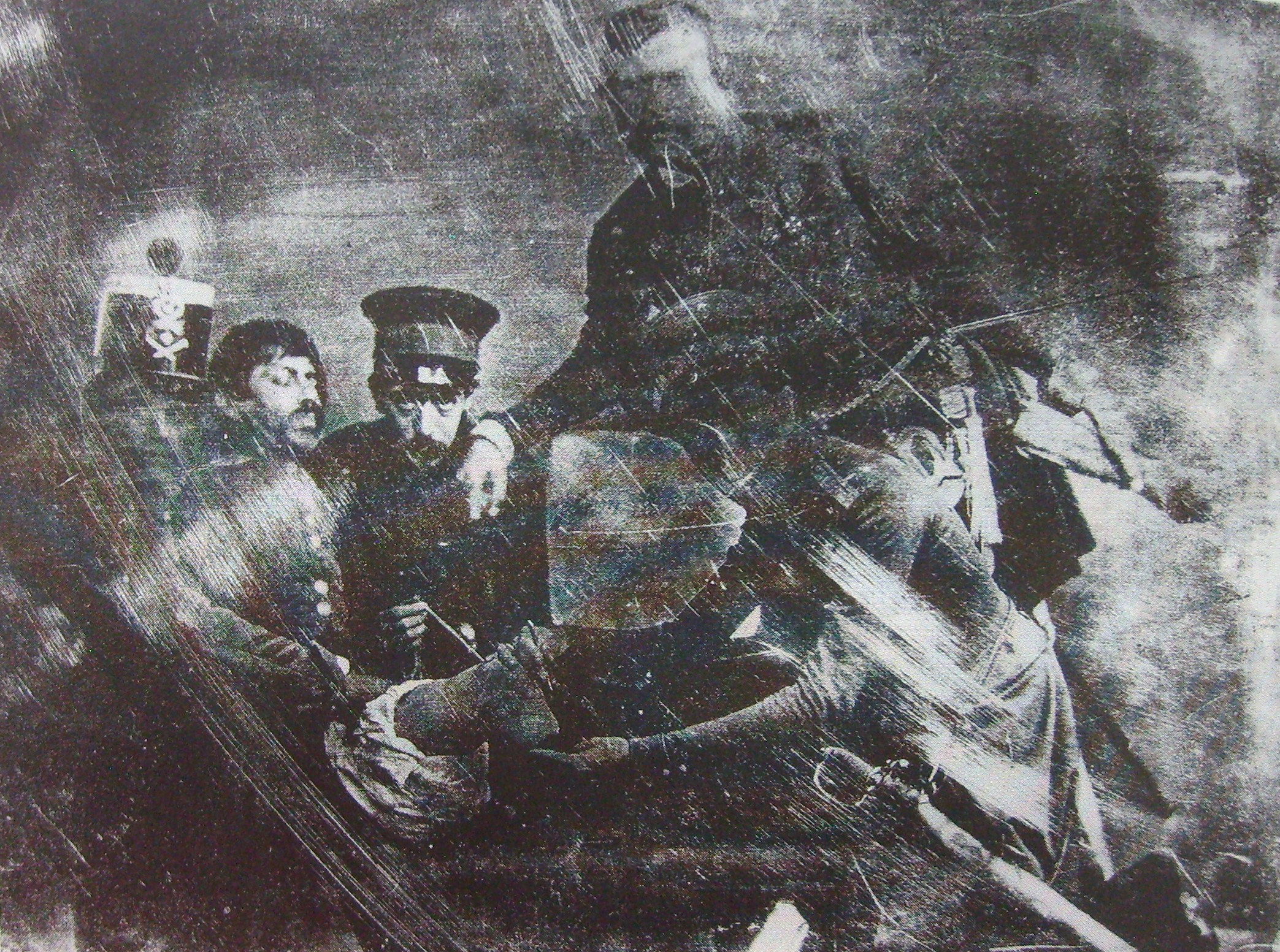
Leg amputation of sergeant Antonio Bustos, practiced by the Belgian surgeon Pedro Vander Linden, who is holding the amputated leg, during the Mexican-American war, it is considered the first daguerreotype of an amputation on the battlefield.

On April 12, Lieutenant Pierre G. T. Beauregard, of the United States Army Corps of Engineers, determined that possession of Atalaya Hill would enable the Mexican position to be turned. The Personal Memoirs of Ulysses S. Grant observe that, in order to determine whether a flanking movement was possible, "reconnaissances were sent out to find, or to make, a road by which the rear of the enemy's works might be reached without a front attack." These reconnaissances were made under the supervision of Captain Robert E. Lee and other officers, "all of whom attained rank and fame." Grant continues that it was the roadways constructed by the engineers which achieved victory:

Under the supervision of the engineers, roadways had been opened over chasms to the right where the walls were so steep that men could barely climb them. Animals could not. These had been opened under cover of night, without attracting the notice of the enemy. The engineers, who had directed the opening, led the way and the troops followed. Artillery was let down the steep slopes by hand, the men engaged attaching a strong rope to the rear axle and letting the guns down, a piece at a time, while the men at the ropes kept their ground on top, paying out gradually, while a few at the front directed the course of the piece. In like manner the guns were drawn by hand up the opposite slope.

Twiggs' division took the hill on April 17, advancing up the slopes to El Telegrafo. Santa Anna reinforced El Telegrafo with Brigadier General Ciriaco Vásquez's 2d Light, 4th, and 11th Infantry. Captain Edward J. Steptoe set up his battery on Atalaya Hill and Major James C. Burnham set up a howitzer across the river.

At 7:00 am on April 18, Twiggs directed William S. Harney's brigade to move against the front of El Telegrafo while Bennett C. Riley attacked from the rear. The combination easily took the hill, killing General Vásquez, and Captain John B. Magruder turned the Mexican guns on the retreating Mexicans. Simultaneously, James Shields' brigade attacked the Mexican camp and took possession of the Jalapa road. Once they realized they were surrounded, the Mexican commanders on the three hills surrendered and by 10:00 am, the remaining Mexican forces fled. 199 officers and 2,837 enlisted men were taken prisoner by the Americans.

== Aftermath ==
Santa Anna, caught off guard by the Fourth Regiment of the Illinois Volunteer Infantry, was compelled to ride off without his artificial leg, which was captured by U.S. forces. In the U.S. the prosthetic inspired song parodies. Showman P.T. Barnum claimed he acquired it for display in his museum. The prosthetic was eventually donated to the state of Illinois, where it was displayed in the Illinois State Military Museum in Springfield, Illinois. A visiting Mexican official was apparently embarrassed at seeing the trophy displayed, and it was removed. It was later the subject of controversy about its return to Mexico.

Some cannons captured by Americans at Cerro Gordo were brought back to the United States as war trophies. The Third Regiment of Illinois Volunteers brought back a six-pound cannon which was displayed temporarily in the Springfield Armory in Massachusetts, and whose current whereabouts are unknown.

Scott moved on to Xalapa, and William J. Worth's division took San Carlos Fortress on April 22. Scott then occupied Puebla on 15 May, before departing for Mexico City on August 7.

Robert E. Lee's career and reputation were also significantly enhanced during the battle. Historian Michael Korda states that "Scott's victory was largely due to Lee's courageous reconnaissance." Lee was highly praised by both Shields and Twiggs in reports and Scott himself wrote, "I feel impelled to make special mention of the services of Captain R.E. Lee, engineers...This officer, greatly distinguished at the siege of Vera Cruz, was again indefatigable during these operations, in reconnaissance as daring as laborious, and of the utmost value." Lee was promoted to the rank of brevet major as a result of the battle and gained a hero's reputation.

== Eponyms ==
Cerro Gordo County, Iowa, Cerro Gordo, North Carolina, Cerro Gordo, Illinois, Cerro Gordo Township, Piatt County, Illinois, and Cerro Gordo Township, Lac qui Parle County, Minnesota take their names from the battle.

== Order of battle ==
Mexico was represented by the remnants of the Division of the North, totaling 5,650 personnel: 150 artillery, 4,000 infantry and 1,500 cavalry: including the Ampudia Brigade (the 3rd, 4th, 5th and 11th line infantry regiments), the Vásquez Brigade (the 1st, 2nd, 3rd and 4th light infantry regiments) and the Juvera Cavalry Brigade (5th, 9th Morelia and the Coraceros cavalry regiments); plus reinforcements from the Capitol: the Rangel Brigade (the 6th Infantry Regiment, Grenadiers of the Guard, Libertad and Galeana battalions, two cavalry squadrons and eight guns), the Pinzon Brigade, and the Canalizo Special Cavalry Division. The 1,000-strong Artega Brigade, consisting of the Pueblo Activos and National Guard battalions, arrived at the end of the battle.

== Gallery ==
An American ambush was discovered at the start of the battle. However, Mexican lines soon collapsed.

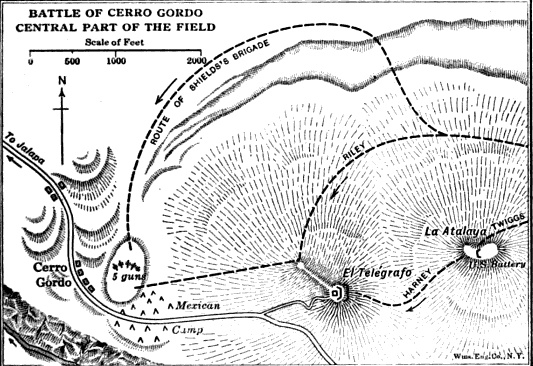
Western portion of field. (Justin H. Smith's The War with Mexico).

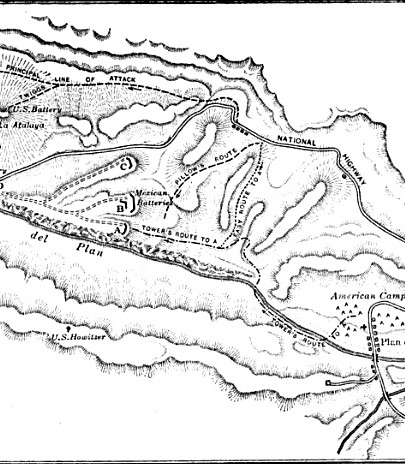
Eastern portion of field. (Justin H. Smith's War with Mexico).

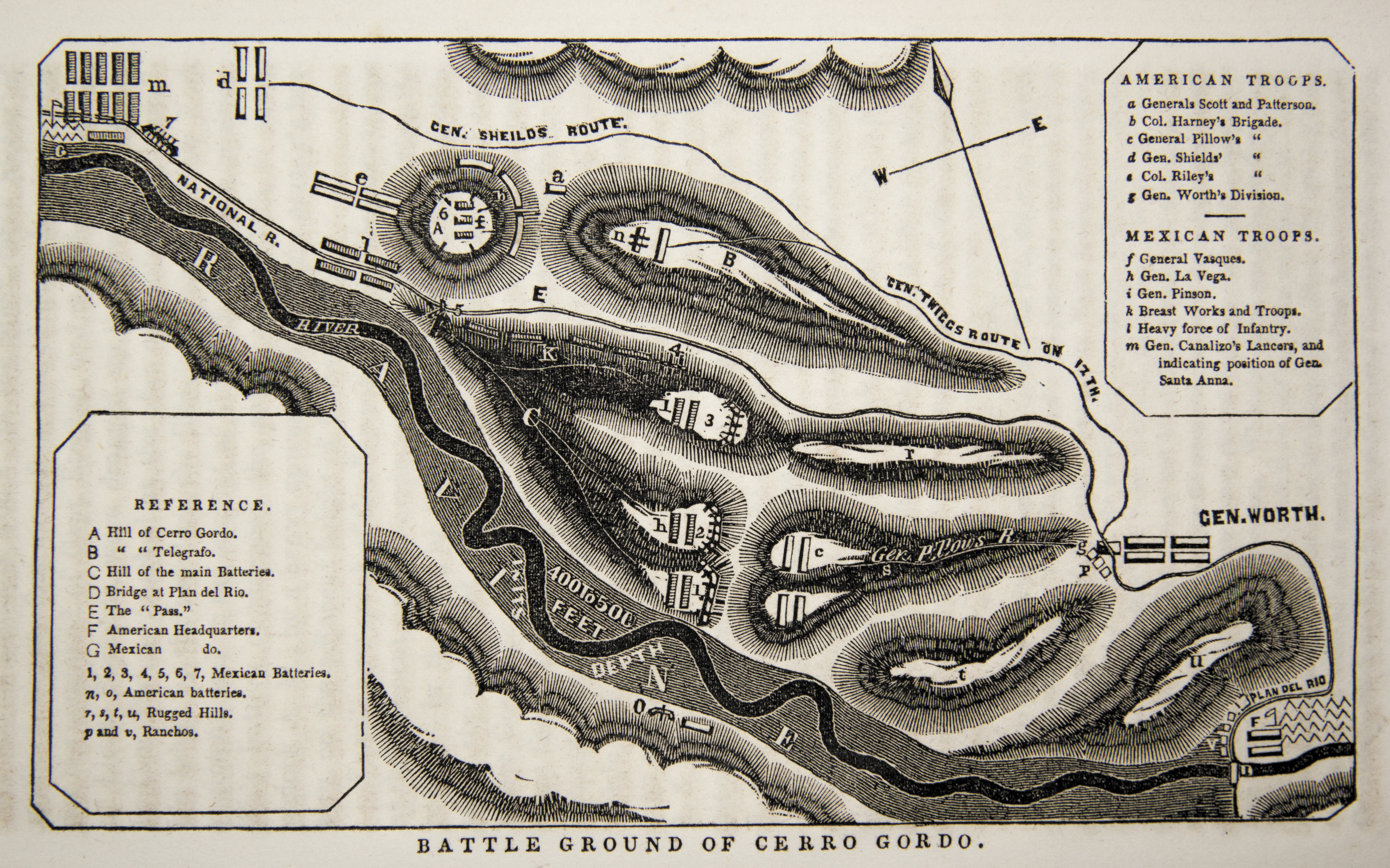
Furber & Stillman's Battle Ground of Cerro Gordo

== See also ==
- Bibliography of the Mexican American War
- Bibliography of James K. Polk
- Saint Patrick's Battalion
