= Saint Patrick's Battalion =

Battalion in the Mexican Army during the Mexican–American War

- Reconstruction of the battalion's flag as described by John Riley.
- Active: 1846–1848
- Allegiance: Mexico
- Branch: Mexican Army
- Type: Artillery/Infantry
- Size: c. 700 (at maximum strength)
- Nicknames: Los San Patricios; Los Colorados Valientes
- Patron: Saint Patrick
- Motto: Erin go bragh
- Colors: Turkish Blue; Sky Blue; Crimson; Yellow^{[a]}
- Engagements: Mexican–American War; Siege of Fort Texas; Battle of Monterrey; Battle of Buena Vista; Battle of Cerro Gordo; Battle of Churubusco; Battle for Mexico City

Commanders
- Colonel of the Regiment: Francisco R. Moreno
- Notable commanders: Brevet Major John Riley^{[b]} Captain Santiago O'Leary; Captain Patrick Dalton; Sergeant Francis O'Connor

The Saint Patrick's Battalion (Spanish: Batallón de San Patricio), later reorganized as the Foreign Legion of Patricios, was a Mexican Army unit which fought against the United States in the Mexican–American War. Consisting of several hundred mostly Irish and other Catholic European expatriates and immigrants, including numerous men who had deserted or defected from the United States Army, the battalion was formed and led by Irishman John Riley. It served as an artillery unit for much of the war, and despite later being formally designated as an infantry unit of two companies, the battalion continued to operate artillery pieces throughout the conflict. The San Patricios participated in many of the bloodiest battles during the American invasion of Mexico, with Ulysses S. Grant remarking that "Churubusco proved to be about the severest battle fought in the valley of Mexico".

Composed primarily of Irish immigrants, the battalion also included German, Canadian, English, French, Italian, Polish, Scottish, Spanish, Swiss and Mexican soldiers, most of whom were Catholic. Several native-born Americans were in the ranks, including fugitive slaves from the Southern United States. Only a few members of the battalion were U.S. citizens. The Mexican government printed propaganda in different languages to entice immigrants serving in the United States Army to switch sides and offered incentives to foreigners who would enlist in its army, including being granted citizenship, being paid higher wages and generous land grants. U.S. Army regiments which had members defect included the 1st Artillery, the 2nd Artillery, the 3rd Artillery, the 4th Artillery, the 2nd Dragoons, the 2nd Infantry, the 3rd Infantry, the 4th Infantry, the 5th Infantry, the 6th Infantry, the 7th Infantry and the 8th Infantry. The San Patricios are honored by Mexican and Irish people.

== Historical perspective ==
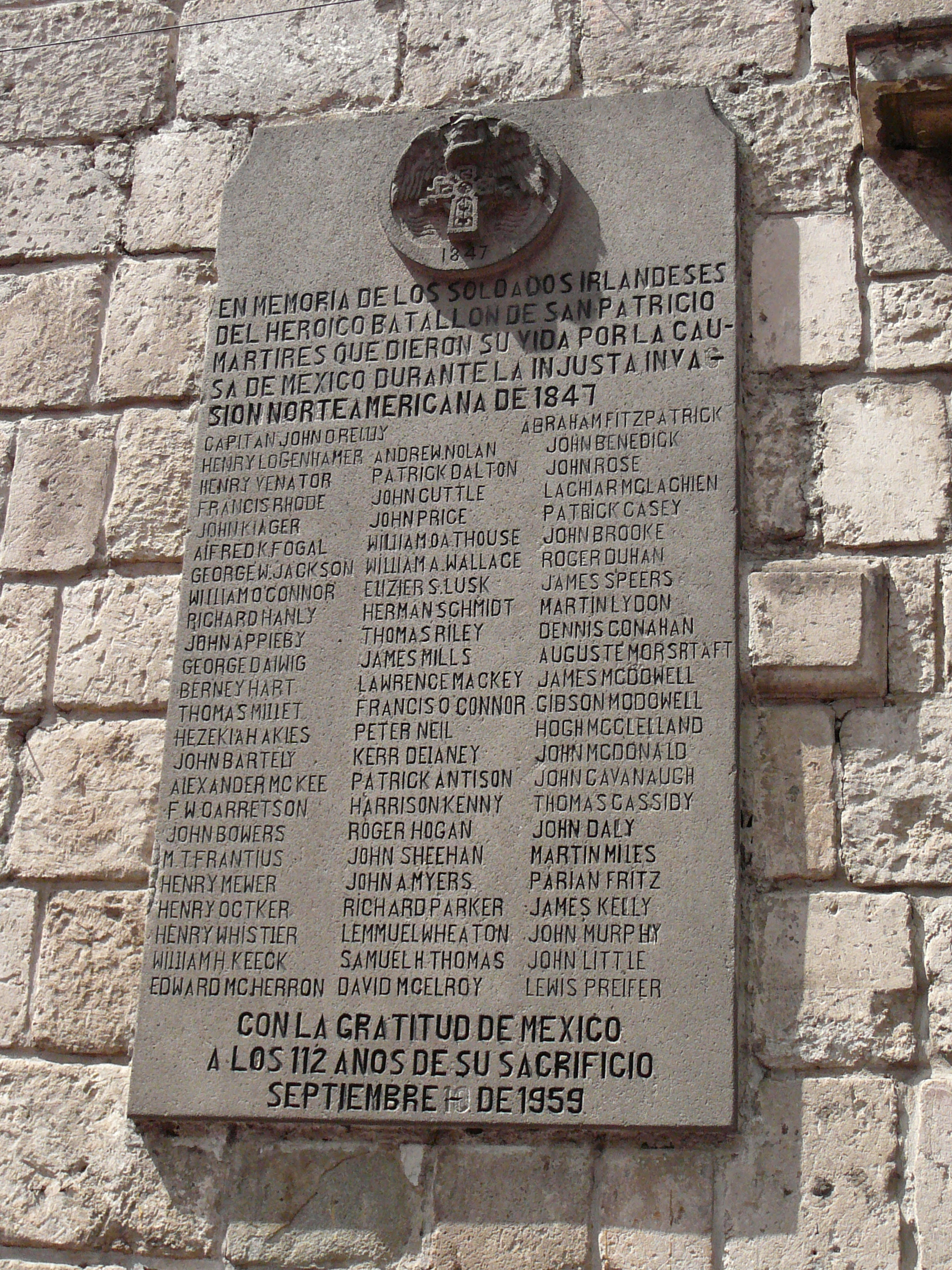
Commemorative plaque placed at the San Jacinto Plaza in the district of San Ángel, Mexico City in 1959: "In memory of the Irish soldiers of the heroic St. Patrick's Battalion, martyrs who gave their lives to the Mexican cause in the United States' unjust invasion of 1847"

For those Mexicans who had fought in the Mexican–American War and for generations to come after, the San Patricios were heroes who came to their aid in an hour of need. For Americans, the San Patricios were traitors, fighting in an unjust attempt by Mexico to reconquer Texas. Successive Mexican presidents have praised the San Patricios; Vicente Fox Quesada stated that, "The affinities between Ireland and Mexico go back to the first years of our nation, when our country fought to preserve its national sovereignty... Then, a brave group of Irish soldiers... in a heroic gesture, decided to fight against the foreign ground invasion", and Mexican president Ernesto Zedillo stated "Members of the St. Patrick's Battalion were executed for following their consciences. They were martyred for adhering to the highest ideals... we honor their memory. In the name of the people of Mexico, I salute today the people of Ireland and express my eternal gratitude".

== Motivations ==
The great majority of those men who formed Saint Patrick's Battalion were recent immigrants who had arrived at northeastern U.S. ports. They were part of the Irish diaspora then escaping the Great Irish Famine and extremely poor economic conditions in Ireland, which was at the time part of the United Kingdom of Great Britain and Ireland. The U.S. Army often recruited the Irish and other immigrants into military service shortly or sometimes immediately after arrival in America in coffin ships with promises of salaries and land after the war.

Numerous theories have been proposed as to their motives for desertion, including cultural alienation, mistreatment of immigrant soldiers by nativist soldiers and senior officers, brutal military discipline and dislike of service in the U.S. military, being forced to attend Protestant church services and being unable to practice their Catholic religion freely as well as religious ideological convictions, the incentive of higher wages and land grants starting at 320 acres (1.3 km^{2}) offered by Mexico, and viewing the U.S. invasion of Mexico as unjust.

It is believed primary motivations were shared religion with the Mexicans and sympathy for the Mexican cause based on similarities between the situations in Mexico and Ireland. This hypothesis is based on evidence of the number of Irish Catholics in the battalion, the letters of John Riley, and the field entries of senior officers. Irish immigrants had been faced with animosity both as a result of their Catholic faith and ethnicity. Catholic immigrants were regularly met with discrimination from their Protestant peers, sentiments which sometimes boiled over into events such as the Philadelphia nativist riots against Irish Catholic immigrants. Catholic churches had been similarly defaced by the American military in Mexico during the war. Additionally, both the Mexicans and the Irish were subjected to racism and xenophobia based on 'scientific racism' and treated as inferior to American nativists.

Another hypothesis is that the members of the Saint Patrick's Battalion had been unhappy with their treatment in the U.S. Army; this was the conviction of George Ballentine, an Englishman who served in the American army. Ballentine stated that while "there was a portion of truth" in the view—commonly assigned by officers—that the deserters joined the Mexican army due to their Catholicism; he said, "I have good reason to believe, in fact in some cases I know, that harsh and unjust treatment by their officers operated far more strongly than any other consideration to produce the deplorable result [desertion]," and described how he found the punishments used for "trivial offensives" to be "revolting and disgusting". Another theory some historians hold is that the soldiers were attracted by the incentives offered by the Mexican government: safe passage throughout Mexico for deserters, generous land grants, and the offer of potential military commissions. For poor people coming from famine conditions, economics was often an important incentive.

Mexican author José Raúl Conseco noted that many Irish lived in northern Texas, and were forced to move south due to regional insecurity. Mainly Irish settlers from San Patricio, Texas, had previously sided with Mexican forces against Texan rebels at the Battle of Lipantitlán in the Texan Revolution.

Irish expatriates had a long tradition of serving as mercenaries in the military forces of Catholic countries, including in European countries after the Williamite War. In the decades leading up to the Mexican-American War many Irish fought in the South American wars of independence.^{[c]}

== Service as a military unit ==
=== Formation and early engagements ===
Present in the Mexican Army for the battles of Palo Alto and Resaca de la Palma were the Legión de Extranjeros (Legion of Foreigners); the men who would later make up the core of the Saint Patrick's battalion. Meanwhile, deserters were abandoning General Taylor's army on the Rio Grande. Riley and "a company of 48 Irishmen" manned Mexican artillery at the Siege of Fort Texas, which took place concurrently to the two other battles. Martin Tritschler, German Mexican and a Captain at the Battle of Cerro Gordo, is attributed with convincing a large number of German soldiers to defect from the U.S. occupying forces in Puebla, Puebla.

The first major engagement of the Saint Patrick's Battalion, as a recognised Mexican unit, was as an artillery battery in the Battle of Monterrey of 21 September 1846. Popularly they were called Los Colorados by the Mexicans because of their ruddy, sun-burnt complexions and red hair color. They were commanded by John Riley,^{[b]} an Irishman who had previously served in the British Army as a non-commissioned officer and possibly arrived in Canada in 1843 whilst serving in his British unit (the assertion that Riley was a sergeant in the 66th (Berkshire) Regiment of Foot is known to be inaccurate). Riley went on to join the U.S. Army in Michigan in September 1845. He deserted in Matamoros in April 1846. Upon meeting Mexican forces he was initially given the Officer rank of Lieutenant by General Pedro de Ampudia.

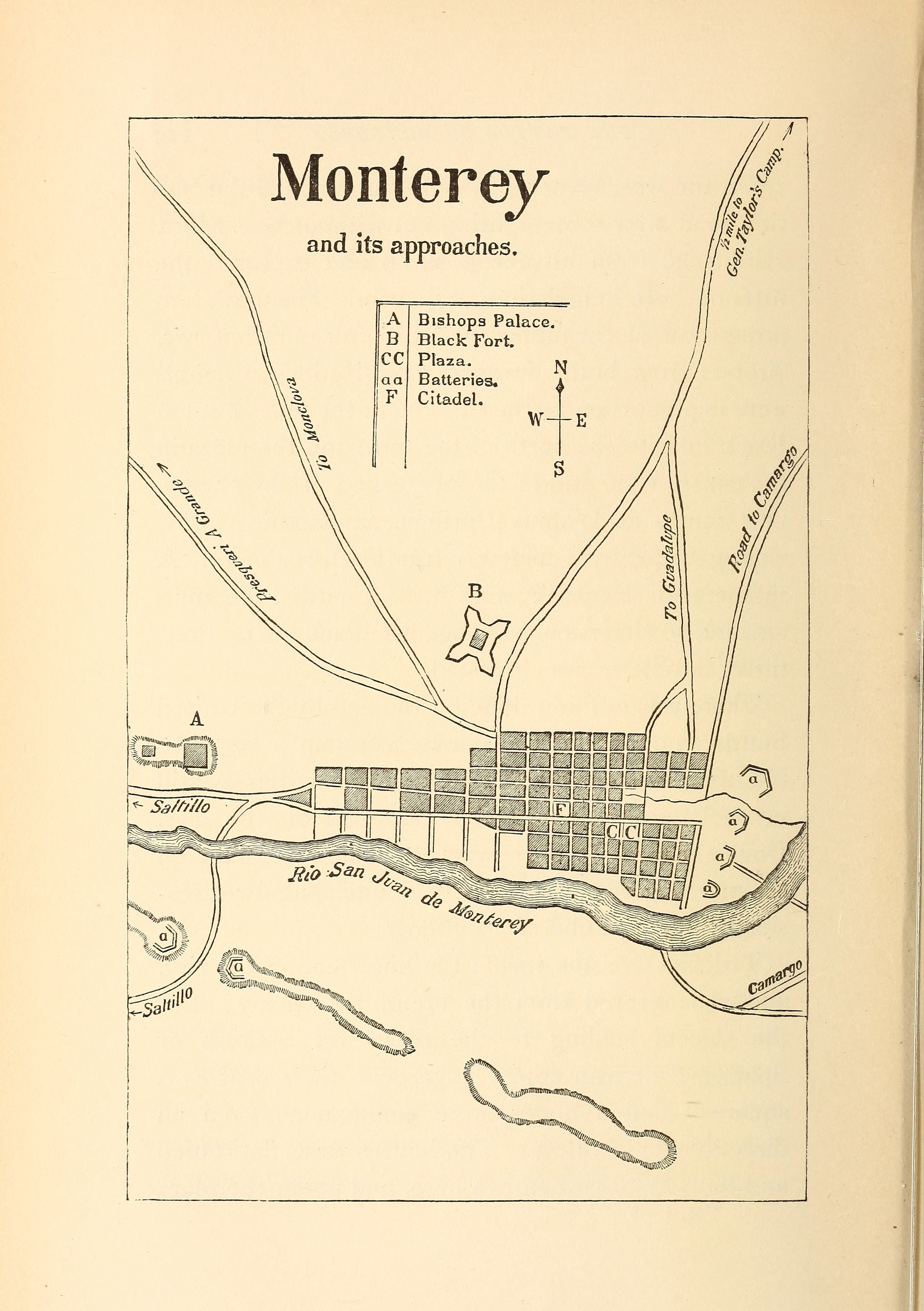
San Patricios defended the city of Monterrey with artillery fire from its citadel, indicated here with the key "F".^{[d]}

At the battle of Monterrey the San Patricios proved their artillery skills by causing the deaths of many American soldiers, and they are credited with defeating two to three separate assaults into the heart of the city. Among their targets were companies led by such officers as Braxton Bragg, many of whose soldiers would end up in their own ranks later in the war. Their tenacity, however, did not affect the Mexican commanders' decision to capitulate and abandon the position.

Following the engagement at Monterrey, the San Patricios grew in number, by some estimates reaching an enlistment of over 700 men. Forces re-assembled at San Luis Potosí and they had their distinct green silk flag embroidered there.

=== Buena Vista ===
They then marched northward after joining a larger force commanded by Antonio López de Santa Anna sent from Mexico City, the "liberating army of the North". At the Battle of Buena Vista (known as the battle of Angostura in Mexico) in Coahuila on 23 February, the Patricios became engaged with U.S. forces. They were assigned the three heaviest—18 and 24 pound—cannons the Mexican army possessed, which were positioned on high ground overlooking the battlefield, at the base of a hillside (just below what is now a gravel mine). They were later described as "a strong Mexican battery ... moved ... by dint of extraordinary exertions ... [that] commanded the entire plateau".

They started the battle supporting Mexican infantry by firing on U.S. lines as the Mexicans advanced on them, then later decimating an artillery battery directly opposite them on the battlefield (Washington's 4th Artillery, D Battery). A small number of San Patricios were dispatched with a division commanded by Manuel Lombardini with the express purpose of capturing the 4th's cannons once the crews had been dealt with. As the division got close enough they charged the artillery battery, bayoneting whoever remained and routing the rest, leaving the attached San Patricios free to haul away two six-pound cannons. These cannons would later be used by Mexican forces at the Battle of Contreras.

In frustration U.S. Commander Zachary Taylor, referring to the Saint Patrick's Battalion, ordered a squadron of the 1st Dragoons to "take that damned battery". In this task they failed, and, badly bloodied, were forced to retreat. At about 1 p.m. the San Patricios covered a Mexican retreat as a disordered mass of infantry sought refuge during a lull in the fighting. The San Patricios rode out the day in a costly artillery duel with several American batteries, which killed or injured roughly one third of them. General Francisco Mejia's Battle Report for Buena Vista described the San Patricios' as "worthy of the most consummate praise because the men fought with daring bravery." Several Irishmen were awarded the War Cross by the Mexican government for their conduct in that battle, and many received field promotions.

=== Re-organization and final battles ===
Despite their excellent performance in a number of engagements as artillery, the much-reduced San Patricios were ordered to muster a larger infantry battalion, as well as a cavalry unit, in mid-1847 by personal order of Santa Anna. It was renamed the Foreign Legion of Patricios and consisted of volunteers from many European countries, commanded by Col. Francisco R. Moreno, with Riley in charge of 1st company and Santiago O'Leary heading up the second. Desertion handbills were produced, specially targeting Catholic Irish, French and German immigrants in the invading U.S. army and stating that "You must not fight against a religious people, nor should you be seen in the ranks of those who proclaim slavery of mankind as a constitutive principle ... liberty is not on the part of those who desire to be lords of the world, robbing properties and territories which do not belong to them and shedding so much blood in order to accomplish their views, views in open war to the principles of our holy religion".

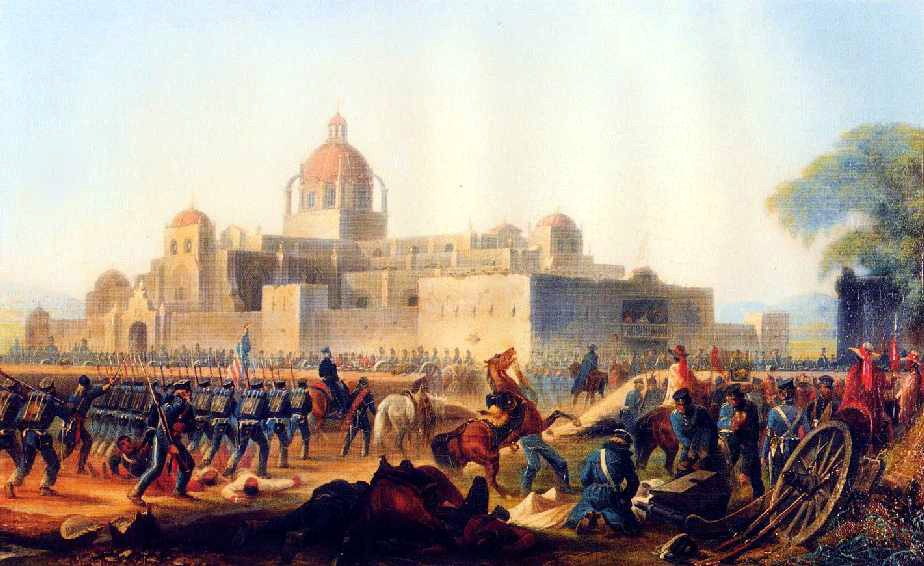
Churubusco's monastery at the height of the 1847 Battle of Churubusco, painted by James Walker

The Battle of Churubusco (20 August 1847) took place about four months after the defeat at Cerro Gordo. Gen. Santa Anna gave a verbal order to "preserve the point at all risk". The San Patricio Companies initially met the attackers outside the walls of the convent at a tête-de-pont, which was about 500 yards (457 m) from a fortified convent. A battery of three to five heavy cannons were used from this position to hold off the American advance along with support from Los Independencia Batallón and Los Bravos Batallón. The Americans were under the command of Col. William Hoffman. Several U.S. charges towards the bridgehead were thrown off, with the San Patricio companies serving as an example to the supporting battalions. Unlike the San Patricios, most of whom were veterans (many having served in the armies of the United Kingdom and various German states), the supporting Mexican battalions were simply militia (the term 'National Guard' is also used) who had been untested by battle.

A lack of ammunition led the Mexican soldiers in the trenches between the bridgehead and the convent to disband; without ammunition, they had no way to fight back. Santa Anna had ordered half of these soldiers to a different part of the battlefield. When the requested ammunition wagon finally arrived, the 9 ½ drachm cartridges were compatible with none but the San Patricio Companies "Brown Bess" muskets, and they made up only a fraction of the defending forces. Further hampering Mexican efforts, a stray spark from an artillery piece firing grapeshot at the on-coming U.S. troops caused the just-arrived ammunition to explode and set fire to several men, including Captain O'Leary and Gen. Anaya. A withdrawal behind the walls of the convento de Churubusco was called when the threat of being outflanked proved too great.

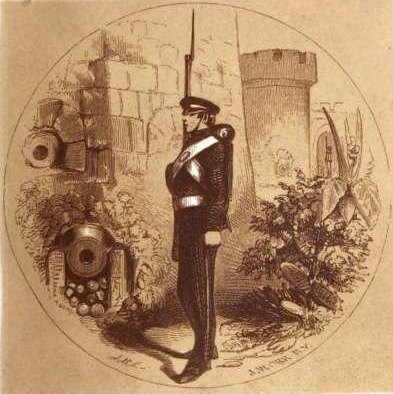
A depiction of George Ballentine, an eyewitness of the battalion

The San Patricios used this battle as a chance to settle old scores with U.S. troops: "The large number of officers killed in the affair was ... ascribed to them, as for the gratification of their revenge they aimed at no other objects during the engagement". At some point during the fighting for the convent, two American officers led fifteen men against a point in the Mexican defenses, and mistook San Patricio members for friendly U.S. army troops; the San Patricios opened fire on them, killing or wounding all but one of the group. Though hopelessly outnumbered and under-equipped, the defenders repelled the attacking U.S. forces with heavy losses until their ammunition ran out and a Mexican officer raised the white flag of surrender. Officer Patrick Dalton of the San Patricios tore the white flag down, prompting Gen. Pedro Anaya to order his men to fight on, with their bare hands if necessary. American Private Ballentine reported that when the Mexicans attempted to raise the white flag two more times, members of the San Patricios shot and killed them. After brutal close-quarters fighting with bayonets and sabers through the halls and rooms inside the convent, U.S. Army Captain James M. Smith suggested a surrender after raising his white handkerchief. Following the U.S. victory, the Americans "ventilat[ed] their vocabulary of Saxon expletives, not very "courteously", on Riley and his beautiful disciples of St. Patrick."

Gen. Anaya stated in his written battle report that 35 San Patricios were killed, 85 taken prisoner (including a wounded John Riley, Captain O'Leary, and Anaya); about 85 escaped with retreating Mexican forces. Some 60% of the San Patricios were killed or captured in the engagement. The survivors were reformed before the Battle of Mexico City some two weeks later and were stationed at Querétaro where the Mexican government had decamped, with some 50 members serving as a body-guard for the commander-in-chief. The battalion were caught up in the infighting and politicking of Mexico at the time, and were under the patronage of a faction that favored suing for ending of the conflict peacefully. New units were later made up of the free survivors of the battle of Churubusco and a roughly equal number of fresh deserters from the U.S. Army. Following the war, the Mexican Government insisted in a clause of the Treaty of Guadalupe Hidalgo that the remaining San Patricio prisoners held by the Americans were to be left in Mexico, and Major General William Orlando Butler issued General Orders 116 on 1 June 1848 stating that; "The prisoners confined at the Citadel, known as the San Patricio prisoners, will be immediately discharged"—Rogue's March was played upon their release. The Saint Patrick's Battalion continued to function as two infantry companies under the command of John Riley, with one unit tasked with sentry duty in Mexico City and the other was stationed in the suburbs of Guadalupe Hidalgo. The San Patricios were officially mustered out of Mexican military service in 1848; some members were alleged to have been involved in an abortive military coup, while historians have said the group was disbanded because of Mexican budget cuts.

== Aftermath of Churubusco ==
=== Trials ===
The San Patricios captured by the U.S. Army were treated and punished as traitors for desertion in time of war. Seventy-two men were immediately charged with desertion by the Army.

Two separate courts-martial were held, one at Tacubaya on 23 August, and another at San Ángel on 26 August. At neither of these trials were the men represented by lawyers nor were transcripts made of the proceedings. This lack of formal legal advice could account for the fact that several of the men claimed that drunkenness had led them to desert (a common defense in military trials at the time that sometimes led to lighter sentences), and others described how they were forced to join the Mexican Army in some form or another. The majority of the San Patricios either offered no defense or their defenses were not recorded. Wealthy Mexicans came to the San Patricios' defence at the trials, and members of Mexico's first families visited them in prison.

=== Sentences ===
One soldier who claimed he was forced to fight by the Mexicans after he was captured by them, and who subsequently refused to do so, was sentenced to death by firing squad instead of hanging, along with another who was found not to have officially joined the Mexican Army.

Most of the convicted San Patricios were sentenced to death by hanging: 30 from the Tacubaya trial and 18 from San Ángel. The rationale was that they had entered Mexican military service following the declaration of war. Execution by hanging was in violation of the contemporary Articles of War, which stipulated that the penalty for desertion and/or defecting to the enemy during a time of war was death by firing squad, regardless of the circumstances. Hanging was reserved only for spies (without uniform) and for "atrocities against civilians", neither of which activities were among the charges brought against any members of the Saint Patrick's Battalion. Although more than 9,000 U.S. soldiers deserted the army during the Mexican–American War, only the San Patricios (who unlike almost all other deserters had also fought against the United States) were punished by hanging.

Those soldiers who had left military service before the official declaration of war on Mexico (Riley among them) were sentenced to "... receive 50 lashes on their bare backs, to be branded with the letter 'D' for deserter, and to wear iron yokes around their necks for the duration of the war." This, too, went against the Articles of War; deserters who left prior to a declaration of war were supposed to be branded, scourged, or sentenced to hard labor. The San Patricios instead received all three punishments, a fate that once again was given to no other deserters during the war.

=== Executions ===
In all, 50 Saint Patrick's Battalion members were officially executed by the U.S. Army, all but two by hanging. Collectively, this was the largest mass execution in United States history. (The hanging of 38 Sioux at the conclusion of the Dakota War of 1862 appears to have been the largest execution by hanging at a single event.) En masse executions for treason took place at three separate locations on three separate dates; 16 were executed on 10 September 1847 at San Ángel, four were executed the following day at the village of Mixcoac on 11 September, and 30 were hanged at Chapultepec on 13 September. One San Patricio was murdered by American soldiers when he was recognised among the prisoners of war in the aftermath of the Battle of Molino del Rey, by being thrown "into a mill flume and crushed by the wheel". At the San Ángel hangings all prisoners were executed without incident except for Patrick Dalton, who, as an American captain described, was "literally choked to death". Dalton had previously voiced concerns regarding his treatment.

By order of Gen. Winfield Scott, thirty San Patricios were to be executed at Chapultepec in full view of the two armies while they fought the Battle of Chapultepec, at the precise moment that the flag of the U.S. replaced the flag of Mexico atop the citadel. This order was carried out by Col. William Harney. Harney was taunted and jeered by the condemned men. While overseeing the hangings, Harney ordered Francis O'Connor hanged although he had had both legs amputated the previous day. When the army surgeon informed the colonel that the absent soldier had lost both his legs in battle, Harney replied: "Bring the damned son of a bitch out! My order was to hang 30 and by God I'll do it!"

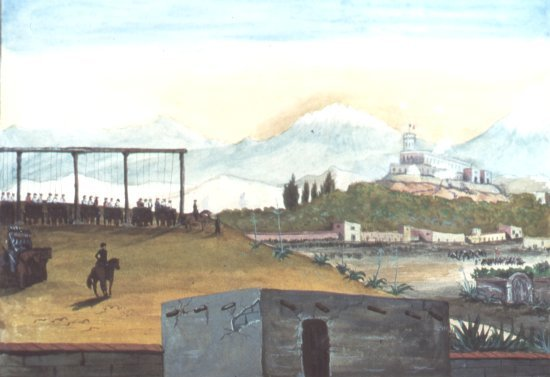
The mass hanging of San Patricios, as portrayed by Samuel Chamberlain, c. 1867

The U.S. flag appeared on the flagpole at 9.30 a.m. Legend has it that the Mexican flag had been taken by a cadet, Juan Escutia of the Niños Héroes, who leapt with it to his death from Chapultepec Castle to deny the Americans the honor of capturing it. In a final act of defiance, the men about to be hanged cheered the Mexican flag, as one onlooker remarked; "Hands tied, feet tied, their voices still free". At Harney's signal, the carts holding the tied and noosed men pulled away. Harney refused to cut the bodies down, stating that "I was ordered to have them hanged, and have no orders to unhang them". Harney was subsequently promoted to brigadier general, which rank he held while the U.S. Army occupied Mexico City.

The Mexican government described the hangings as "a cruel death or horrible torments, improper in a civilized age, and [ironic] for a people who aspire to the title of illustrious and humane", and by a writer covering the war as "a refinement of cruelty and ... fiendish". George Ballentine remarked, in his account of his American military service in Mexico, "[T]he desertion of our soldiers to the Mexican army ... were still numerous, in spite of the fearful example of the executions at Churubusco, [and] also served to inspire that party with hope."

== Legacy ==
Those who survived either made lives for themselves in Mexico or returned to their home nations such as Ireland. Some former San Patricios found work at the arsenal in Guadalajara making gun stocks. One former San Patricio, an Irishman, started a military academy teaching "the sword exercise", also in Guadalajara. Others were reportedly killed while travelling through Mexico, while others were reduced to living on handouts. A handful are on record as having made use of the land claims promised them by the Mexican government. Americans in Mexico who had been taken prisoner by Mexico or who were common deserters were known to falsely present themselves as members of the Saint Patrick's Battalion; American William W. Carpenter, who found himself in this predicament, stated that: "the reputation of the San Patricio battalion was spread from ocean to ocean, and to that, more than any thing else, do I owe my present safety".

The men have continued to be honored and revered as heroes in Mexico. The Batallón de San Patricio is memorialised on two separate days; 12 September, the generally accepted anniversary of the executions of those battalion members captured by the U.S. Army, and 17 March, Saint Patrick's Day. Numerous schools, churches and other landmarks in Mexico take their name from the battalion, including:

- Monterrey: The street in front of the Irish School is named Batallón de San Patricio (Battalion of Saint Patrick).
- Mexico City: The street in front of the Santa María de Churubusco convent was named Mártires Irlandeses ("the Irish martyrs").
- The Wall of Honor in Mexico's Chamber of Deputies: On Thursday, 28 October 2002 the LVII Mexican Congress held a ceremony where the inscription "Defensores de la Patria 1846–1848 y Batallón de San Patricio" [Defenders of the Motherland 1846–1848 and the San Patricio Battalion] was inscribed in gold letters.
- Banda de Gaitas del Batallon de San Patricio [St. Patrick's Battalion Pipes & Drums]: The only bagpipe band in Mexico is named after the battalion, and based at the former Convent of Churubusco in Mexico City, which now houses the Museum of Foreign Interventions (Museo Nacional de las Intervenciones). The band was inducted into the Irish America Hall of Fame in 2013.
- San Patricio station: Metro Zapata was renamed for one day to Metro San Patricio, on 17 March 2015, to commemorate Saint Patrick's day and the Saint Patrick's Battalion. This was the first time a metro had been renamed in such a manner.

In the U.S., the memory of the battalion has been different. In Winfield Scott's 1852 run for President of the United States, his treatment of the San Patricios was brought up by his opponents to sway Irish American voters. The U.S. Army long denied the existence of the Saint Patrick's Battalion, as a cover-up and an attempt to discourage other deserters. In 1915, an inquiry was initiated by U.S. congressmen William Henry Coleman and Frank L. Greene. This resulted in the U.S. Army's admitting its denial of the matter. The U.S. Congress ordered the army to turn over its records on the battalion to the National Archives. In 1999, MGM cancelled the U.S. distribution of a film depicting the battalion, One Man's Hero. The San Patricios are rarely covered in American education; on the rare occasion that they are mentioned, it is pointed out that they were traitors (if holding US citizenship), and small in number. Reasons given for having abandoned the United States included religious sympathy, and pursuit of money and land.

Preferring to fight with the Catholic Mexicans against the Protestant Americans, the San Patricios were the only group of deserters in American history to band together in the service of a foreign enemy.

— Peter Quinn, Looking for Jimmy: A Search for Irish America

In 1997, President of Mexico Ernesto Zedillo commemorated the 150th anniversary of the execution of the San Patricios at a ceremony in Mexico City's San Jacinto Plaza. This is where the U.S. Army conducted the first 16 hangings after the men were convicted of desertion at court martial. Ireland and Mexico jointly issued commemorative postage stamps to mark the anniversary.

In 2004, at an official ceremony attended by numerous international dignitaries, including directors Lance and Jason Hool and several actors from the film One Man's Hero, the Mexican government gave a commemorative statue to the Irish government in perpetual thanks for the bravery, honor and sacrifice of the Saint Patrick's Battalion. The statue was erected in the town of Clifden, Connemara, Ireland, where leader John Riley was born. Clifden flies the Mexican flag in honor of Riley every year on 12 September. In 2014, Sinn Féin named a cumann in Clifden in honor of Reilly.

External image
- An image displaying both the Irish and Mexican versions of the joint issue stamp

The battalion has inspired numerous responses: it is the name of an supporters's association of the association football team Club Deportivo Chivas USA. The unit was evoked in a Saint Patrick's Day message from Subcomandante Marcos of the Zapatista Army of National Liberation, The San Patricios have been remembered as a symbol of international solidarity with Mexico.

== Flag ==
There are conflicting accounts of the design of the flag of the Saint Patrick's Battalion. No flags or depictions of them are known to have survived to the present day. The only version of the flag known to have survived the war was subsequently lost or stolen from the chapel at West Point.

John Riley, who left an account of the battalion, noted the flag in a letter:

In all my letter, I forgot to tell you under what banner we fought so bravely. It was that glorious Emblem of native rights, that being the banner which should have floated over our native Soil many years ago, it was St. Patrick, the Harp of Erin, the Shamrock upon a green field.

The green harp flag in its 18th to 19th century design, showing the "Maid of Erin" as the harp's pillar, her wing forming the harp's neck, and the inscription Erin go Bragh ("Ireland forever")

According to George Wilkins Kendall, an American journalist covering the war with Mexico:

The banner is of green silk, and on one side is a harp, surmounted by the Mexican coat of arms, with a scroll on which is painted Libertad por la Republica Mexicana [Liberty for the Mexican Republic]. Under the harp is the motto of Erin go Bragh! On the other side is a painting ... made to represent St. Patrick, in his left hand a key and in his right a crook or staff resting upon a serpent. Underneath is painted San Patricio.

Two other eye-witness accounts of the flag exist, both from American soldiers. The first describes it as:

... a beautiful green silk banner [which] waved over their heads; on it glittered a silver cross and a golden harp, embroidered by the hands of the fair nuns of San Luis Potosí.

— Samuel E. Chamberlain, My Confession,

The second notes only:

Among the mighty host we passed was O'Reilly [sic] and his company of deserters bearing aloft in high disgrace the holy banner of St. Patrick.

— Kentucky cavalryman (Mexican POW), name unknown,

A radically different version of the flag was described in a Mexican source:

They had a white flag/standard, on which were found the shields of Ireland and Mexico, and the name of their captain, John O'Reilly [sic] embroidered in green.

Whatever the case, in 1997 a reproduction military flag was created by the Clifden and Connemara Heritage Group. Another was created the following year for the MGM film One Man's Hero, a romanticised version of the San Patricios' history. A third version embodying the description of the San Luis Potosí flag was made for the Irish Society of Chicago, which hung it in the city's Union League Club.

Some writers suggest that the Saint Patrick's Battalion might have used different banners (as an artillery unit, as an infantry company, and as a reconstructed unit).

=== Music ===
A number of musical works have covered the battalion, including:

- "Saint Patrick's Battalion" – by The Elders (on Story Road)
- "St Patricks Battalion" by The Wakes
- "San Patricio" – album by The Chieftains and Ry Cooder
- "San Patricio Brigade" – by Black 47
- "San Patricios" – by Street Dogs (on State of Grace)
- "St Patrick's Brave Brigade" – by Damien Dempsey
- "St Patrick's Battalion" – by David Rovics
- "The Piper for the San Patricios" – by David Rovics
- "The San Patricios" – by The Fenians
- "John Riley" – by Paul McKenna Band

=== Films and fiction ===
- 1962 – Saint Patrick's Battalion, by Carl Krueger
- 1985 – A Flag to Fly: Based on True Story of the St. Patrick's Battalion in Mexico 1847, by Chris Matthews
- 1996 – The San Patricios, directed by Mark R. Day
- 1997 – In the Rogue Blood, by James Carlos Blake, winner of Los Angeles Times Book Prize for Fiction,
- 1998 – St. Patrick's Battalion, documentary film directed by Jason Hool
- 1999 – One Man's Hero, feature film directed by Lance Hool, written by Milton S. Gelman
- 2001 – Gone for Soldiers, novel by Jeff Shaara
- 2006 – Saint Patrick's Battalion, novel by James Alexander Thom, published by Blue River Press of Indianapolis
- 2009 – Just like me, novel by Michael Fallaw. ISBN 978-1436385084
- 2011 – Saol John Riley, TG4 (Ireland) documentary, directed by Kieran Concannon
- 2012 – Country of the Bad Wolfes, novel by James Carlos Blake, published by Cinco Puntos Press, El Paso, TX
- 2018 – El Batallón de San Patricio, novel by Pino Cacucci, published by Grijalbo
- 2017 - The Battle of Churubusco, novel by Andrea Ferraris, published by Fantagraphics

== Notes ==
a. The coats were Turkish-blue with yellow lapels and crimson-red cuffs as well as piping. The trousers were sky-blue with red piping. Officers wore black or blue Kepis and privates wore dark-blue cloth barracks caps, with red tassels similar to a Fez, also with red piping.

b. ^{1} ^{2} Variably spelled in English as John Reily, Riely, Reilly, O'Reily and O'Reilly. His name is given as Juan Reyle, Reley, Reely and Reiley in Mexican army documents written in Spanish. Regardless of other variant spellings, the name was Seán Ó Raghailligh in the original Irish Gaelic.

c. See articles 1st Venezuelan Rifles, Bernardo O'Higgins, Daniel Florencio O'Leary, Juan O'Donojú, Morgan O'Connell, & William Lamport.

d. Monterrey is here spelled "Monterey" as it appears in the Personal Memoirs of Ulysses S. Grant (Not to be confused with Monterey of the Battle of Monterey, also in the Mexican–American War).

== See also ==
- 69th New York Infantry
- Fenian raids
- Irish Brigade (France)
- Irish Brigade (Spanish Civil War)
- Irish Brigade (Union Army)
- John Murphy (Saint Patrick's Battalion)
- List of battles of the Mexican–American War
- Niños Héroes
- List of military units named after people

== Sources ==
=== Primary sources ===
- Ballentine, George (1860). The Mexican War, by an English Soldier: Comprising Incidents and Adventures in the United States and Mexico with the American Army. New York: W. A. Townsend & Co.
- Carpenter, William W. (1851). Travels and adventures in Mexico : in the course of journeys of upward of 2500 miles, performed on foot; giving an account of the manners and customs of the people, and the agricultural and mineral resources of that country. New York: Harper & Bros.
- Chamberlain, Samuel (1853). My Confession: Recollections of a Rogue. New York: Harper & Bros.
- Grant, Ulysses S. (1998) [1885]. Personal memoirs of Ulysses S. Grant, Volume I. Scituate, Massachusetts. ISBN 978-1582181899 – via Digital Scanning Inc.
- Kendall, George Wilkins (1999). Cress, Lawrence Delbert (ed.). Dispatches from the Mexican-American War. University of Oklahoma Press. ISBN 0806131217.
- Hogan, Michael (1998). "The Death of John Riley— Revisited". El Ojo de Agua. Archived from the original on 31 July 2021.
- Ramsey, Albert C., ed. (1850). The other side; or, notes for the history of the war between Mexico and the United States. New York: John Wiley.
- "CL Aniversario del batallón de San patricio" (in Spanish). Presidency of the Republic of Mexico. 12 September 1997. Archived from the original on 2 April 2015. "Al conmemorar la gesta heroica del Batallón de San Patricio honramos la memoria de todos los hombres y de todas las mujeres que han luchado y siguen luchando por construir un mundo más justo, más incluyente y más democrático, independientemente de su origen étnico, su condición social, su herencia cultural y su filosofía de vida. [As we commemorate the heroic gesture of the St. Patrick's Battalion, we honor the memory of all men and all women who have fought and are still struggling to build a world more just, more democratic and inclusive, regardless of their ethnic origin, social status, cultural heritage and philosophy of life]"
- "Mexico City renames Metro Station after St Patrick for one day". MerrionStreet.com. Irish Government News Service. 17 March 2015.

=== Secondary sources ===
- Bauer, K. Jack (1992). The Mexican War, 1846–48. University of Nebraska Press. ISBN 0803261071.
- Boyer, Sandy (19 March 2010). "Defying a war of conquest". socialistworker.org.
- Callaghan, James (November 1995). "The San Patricios". American Heritage Magazine. 46 (7). American Heritage Publishing Co.
- Cave, Damien (30 October 2013). "A Reminder of a Conflict That Faded into History". The New York Times.
- Connaughton, Michael G. (September 2005). "Beneath an Emerald Green Flag: The Story of Irish Soldiers in Mexico". irlandeses.org. Society for Irish Latin American Studies.
- Downey, Fairfax (June 1955). "Tragic Story of the San Patricio Battalion". American Heritage Magazine. 6 (4). American Heritage Publishing Co.
- Eisenhower, John S. D. (1999). Agent of Destiny: The Life and Times of General Winfield Scott. University of Oklahoma Press. ISBN 978-0806131283.
- Fast, Howard (February 1993). "Inglorious Tale from the Mexican War". trussel.com.
- Ferrigan III, James J. (8 February 2000). "Three flags for the Batallón de San Patricio?". FOTW Flags of the World website.
- Fogarty, James (September 2005). "The St. Patricio Battalion: The Irish Soldiers of Mexico". Society for Irish Latin American Studies.
- Foos, Paul (2002). A Short, Offhand, Killing Affair: Soldiers and Social Conflict during the Mexican—American War. University of North Carolina Press. ISBN 978-0807854051.
- Frías, Heriberto (1984). La guerra contra los gringos [The war against the gringos] (in Spanish). Mexico City: Ediciones Leega / Jucar. ISBN 968495011X.
- Gonzales, Manuel G. (2000). Mexicanos: A history of Mexicans in the United States. Indiana University Press. ISBN 0253335205.
- Hawley, Chris (10 March 2008). "Bagpipers honor Irish who fought for Mexico". USA Today.
- Hogan, Michael (1997). "The Irish Soldiers of Mexico". History Ireland. 5 (4): 39–43. JSTOR 27724506.
- Hogan, Michael (2011). Irish Soldiers of Mexico. Guadalajara, Mexico: Fondo Editorial Universitario. ISBN 978-9687846002.
- Hogan, Michael (15 September 2006). "Los San Patricios: The Irish Soldiers of Mexico". Indymedia.
- Hopkins, G. T. (September 1913). "The San Patricio Battalion in the Mexican War". Cavalry Journal. XXIV: 279–284.
- Howes, Kelly King (2003). Mexican American war. UXL. ISBN 0787665371.
- Leahy, Dan; et al. (June 2002). "Students Seek To Have Expulsion Order Annulled". Mexican Labor News & Analysis. 7 (5). UE International Solidarity. Archived from the original on 2 April 2015.
- Lloyd, David (2000). Ireland After History. University of Notre Dame Press. ISBN 0268012180.
- Looby, David (13 August 2015). "Mexican-Irish historical link celebrated". Independent.ie.
- McCaffery, James M. (1994). Army of Manifest Destiny: The American Soldier in the Mexican War, 1846–1848. New York University Press. ISBN 978-0814755051.
- McCornack, Richard (1958). "The San Patricio Deserters in the Mexican War, 1847". The Irish Sword. Vol. 3.
- Mermann-Jozwiak, Elisabeth (Fall 2001). "An interview with Montserrat Fontes". MELUS. 26 (3). The Society for the Study of the Multi-Ethnic Literature of the United States / Oxford University Press: 145–161. doi:10.2307/3185561. JSTOR 3185561.
- Miller, Robert Ryal (1989). Shamrock and Sword, The Saint Patrick's Battalion in the US—Mexican War. Norman, Oklahoma: University of Oklahoma Press. ISBN 0806129646.
- Meltzer, Milton (1974). Bound for the Rio Grande; the Mexican Struggle, 1845–1850. New York: Knopf. ISBN 0394824407.
- Newark, Tim (2012). The Fighting Irish: The Story of the Extraordinary Irish Soldier. Hachette UK. ISBN 9781780335117.
- Nordstrom, Pat (18 January 2008). "San Patricio Battalion". Handbook of Texas. Texas State Historical Association.
- Paredes, Martín (4 December 2010). "The Irish Heroes of Mexico". Clifden and Connemara Heritage Society.
- Quinn, Peter (2007). Looking for Jimmy: A Search for Irish America. New York: The Overlook Press. ISBN 978-1590200230.
- Rollins, Peter C. (2008). Why We Fought: America's Wars in Film and History. University Press of Kentucky. ISBN 978-0813191911.
- Radford Ruether, Rosemary (2007). America, Amerikkka: Elect Nation and Imperial Violence. Routledge. ISBN 978-1845531584.
- Ramold, Steven (2010). Baring the Iron Hand: Discipline in the Union Army. Northern Illinois University Press. ISBN 978-0875804088.
- Smith, Justin H. (1919a). The War with Mexico, vol 1. New York: Macmillan.
- Smith, Justin H. (1919b). The War with Mexico, vol 2. New York: Macmillan.
- Stevens, Peter F. (1999). The Rogue's March: John Riley and the St. Patrick's Battalion. Washington, DC: Brassey's. ISBN 1574887386.
- Super, John C. (1992). The United States at War. Salem Press. ISBN 978-1587652363.
- Tucker, Spencer; Arnold, James R.; Wiener, Roberta, eds. (2013). The Encyclopedia of the Mexican-American War: A Political, Social, and Military History, Volume 1. ABC-CLIO. ISBN 9781851098538.
- Wallace, Edward S (Summer 1950). "The Battalion of Saint Patrick in the Mexican War" (PDF). Military Affairs. 14 (2): 84–91. doi:10.2307/1982456. JSTOR 1982456.
- Woolf, Christopher (17 March 2015). "On St. Patrick's Day, Mexico remembers the Irishmen who fought for Mexico against the US". Public Radio International.
- Wunn, Dennis J. (1984). San Patricio Soldiers: Mexico's Foreign Legion. Texas Western Press. ISBN 0-87404-150-3.
- Zinn, Howard; Arnove, Anthony (2004). A People's History of the United States (1st ed.). New York: Seven Stories Press. ISBN 1583226281.
- Wagenen, Michael Van (2012). Remembering the Forgotten War: The Enduring Legacies of the U.S./Mexican War. University of Massachusetts Press. ISBN 978-1558499300.
- "Mexican-Irish hero to be honoured in Clifden". Galway Advertiser. 6 November 2014.

=== Tertiary sources ===
- Garibay, Ángel María; Teixidor, Felipe, eds. (1971). Diccionario Porrúa de historia, biografía y geografía de México. Vol. 3 (3rd ed.). Mexico City: Editorial Porrúa. p. 3146. "Tenían una insignia blanca, en la que se encontraban los escudos de Irlanda y Mexico, y el nombre de su capitán, John O'Reilly bordado en verde."
- The United States in Latin America: A Historical Dictionary, vol. S, 2008, p. 311
- "The Chieftains And Ry Cooder Tell 'San Patricio' History". npr.org. NPR. 7 March 2010.
- Dickson, Ted, ed. (2008). America on the World Stage: A Global Approach to U.S. History. University of Illinois Press. p. 145. ISBN 978-0252075520.

=== Further reading ===
- Murray, Edmundo (2006). "The San Patricio Battalion: A Bibliography". irlandeses.org. Society for Irish Latin American Studies.
