= Rancho San Luisito =

Land grant in California

Coordinates: 35.360°N 120.750°W

Rancho San Luisito was a 4,389-acre (17.76 km^{2}) Mexican land grant in present day San Luis Obispo County, California given in 1841 by Governor Juan B. Alvarado to José de Guadalupe Cantúa. The grant between Morro Bay and San Luis Obispo, extended along San Luisito Creek and Chorro Creek and encompassed Hollister Peak.

== History ==
Ygnacio Cantua, came to Alta California as a soldier on the De Anza Expedition in 1774, and was one of the original settlers in San Juan Bautista, arriving in 1788. His son, José de Guadalupe Cantúa (1786–) served in the army stationed at San Juan Bautista and lead the party that first explored Arroyo Cantúa area. Cantua Creek is named in his honor. Two of Guadalupe Cantúa's sons, Lupe and Domingo, were members of the California bandit Joaquin Murrieta's gang and lived at Arroyo Cantúa. His daughter, Maria Guadalupe Cantua married Jose Hermenegildo Vásquez and their son was Tiburcio Vásquez, another famous California bandit.

With the cession of California to the United States following the Mexican–American War, the 1848 Treaty of Guadalupe Hidalgo provided that the land grants would be honored. As required by the Land Act of 1851, a claim for Rancho San Luisito was filed with the Public Land Commission in 1852, and the grant was patented to Guadalupe Cantua in 1860.

In 1859, Cantua sold part (1860 Census shows Cantua, his wife and three Indian servants living on 1,000 acres of the Rancho) of Rancho San Luisito to captain John (Juan) Wilson (1797 – 1861), a Scottish-born sea captain and trader, came to California in 1830. He is referenced as the captain of the Ayacucho in Richard Henry Dana's Two Years Before the Mast, as is his ownership of this rancho and his marriage to Doña Ramona. In 1837, Wilson married María Ramona Carrillo de Pacheco (1812 – 1888), widow of José Antonio Romualdo Pacheco, who was killed at the Battle of Cahuenga Pass in 1831. Carrillo was a daughter of María Ygnacia López de Carrillo, the grantee of Rancho Cabeza de Santa Rosa. María's sister married General Mariano Guadalupe Vallejo. María Ramona Carrillo de Pacheco was the grantee of Rancho Suey. Wilson was the grantee of Rancho Los Guilicos in Sonoma County. John Wilson and his business partner, James (Diego) Scott (-1851), also owned Rancho El Chorro and Rancho Cañada de los Osos y Pecho y Islay. In 1845, Wilson moved his family from San Luis Obispo to Rancho Cañada de los Osos & Pacheco y Islay, built an adobe home and lived there until his death in 1860.

After the 1862-4 drought, Rancho San Luisito was sold to William Welles Hollister.

== Historic sites of the Rancho ==
- Hollister Adobe. Guadalupe Cantua added on to the San Luisito Adobe in 1841 and portions of the adobe still stand on the Cuesta College campus. It is now known as the Hollister Adobe as the Joseph Hollister family moved to this ranch and into the adobe in 1866.

== See also ==
- Ranchos of California
- List of ranchos of California
