= Rancho Cañada de los Osos y Pecho y Islay =

Historic Mexican land grant in present-day California, United States

Coordinates: 35.260°N 120.840°W

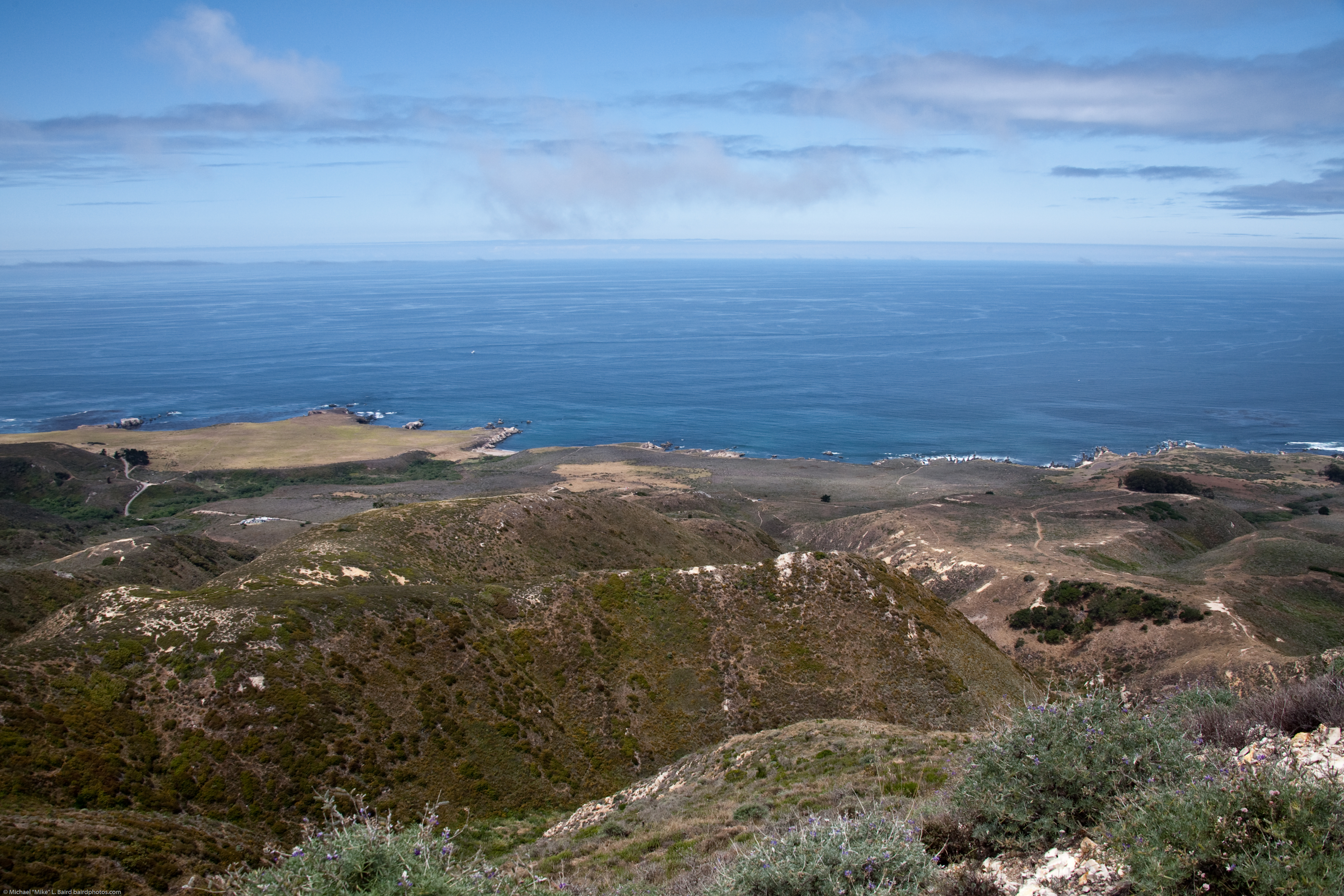
The Pacific Ocean coastline from Valencia Peak, in present-day Montaña de Oro State Park. All of the land in this photo was part of the old Rancho Pecho y Islay.

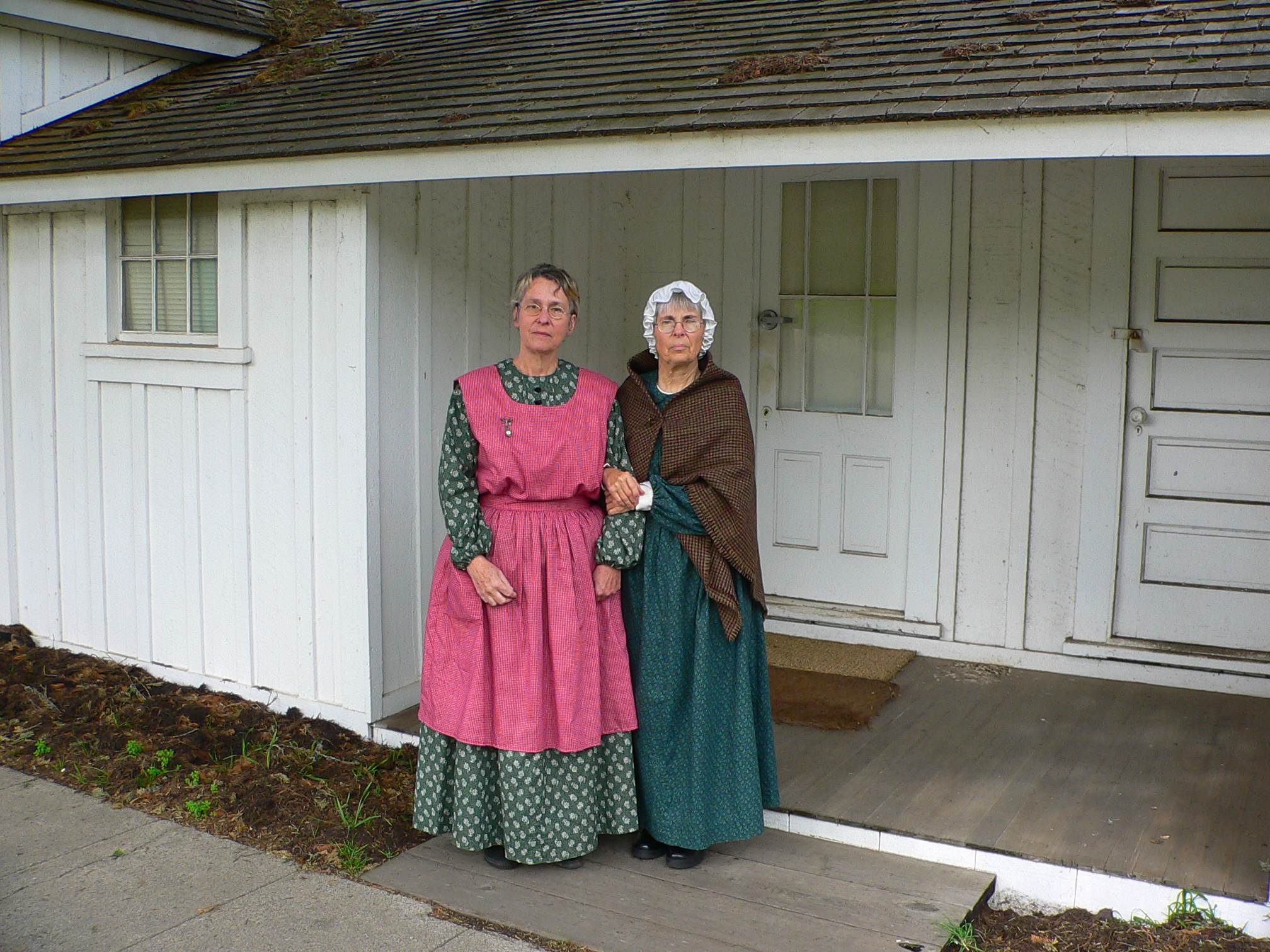
Old Spooner Ranch House, living history program, 2005

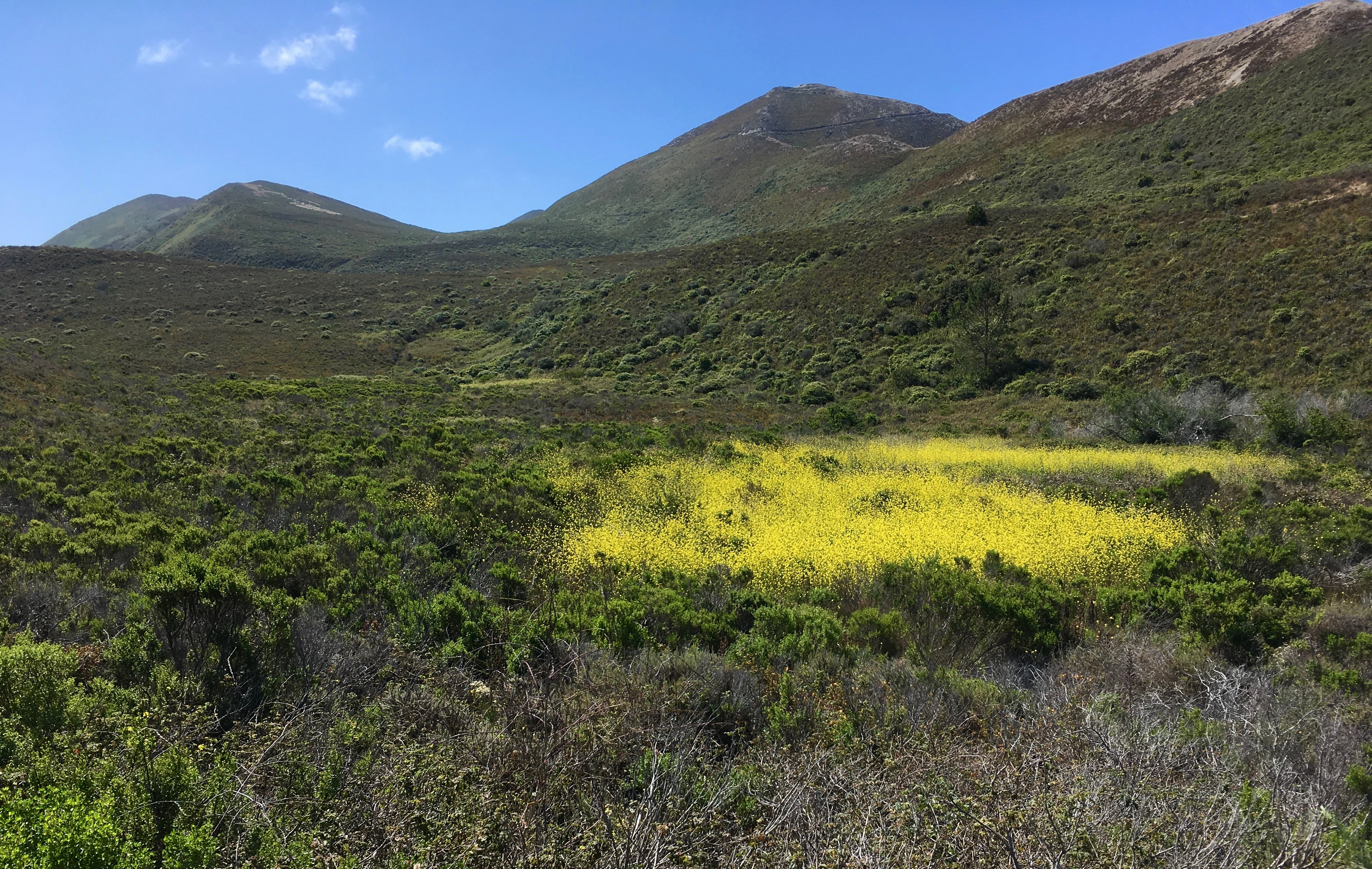
Site of the historic Pecho Ranch Reservoir, Reservoir Flats Trail, Montaña de Oro State Park

Rancho Cañada de los Osos y Pecho y Islay was a 32,431-acre (131.24 km^{2}) Mexican land grant in Los Osos Valley and the southern Estero Bay headlands, in present-day San Luis Obispo County, California.

The grant consists of Rancho Cañada de Los Osos (Valley of the Bears), granted in 1842 by Governor Juan Bautista Alvarado to Víctor Linares, and Rancho Pecho y Islay, granted in 1843 by Governor Manuel Micheltorena to Francisco Badillo. The grants were consolidated in the 1845 grant of Rancho Cañada de los Osos y Pecho y Islay by Governor Pío Pico to James Scott and John Wilson, after they had been purchased from the original grantees.

The Cañada de Los Osos grant extended from the Pacific Coast, along Los Osos Creek and the Los Osos Valley almost to present-day San Luis Obispo, and southward encompassed what is now the town of Los Osos, Montaña de Oro State Park north of Islay Creek, and the northern Irish Hills.

The Rancho Pecho y Islay grant was a strip of coastal plain along the Pacific Ocean that ran from Islay Creek to Pecho Creek and up that creek to the summit of the Irish Hills to the "boundary with the land of Don Victor Linares." It includes the southern part of Montaña de Oro State Park and the site of the Diablo Canyon Power Plant.

== History ==
Rancho Cañada de Los Osos (northern portion) was granted in 1842 by Governor Alvarado to Víctor Linares, and Rancho Pecho y Islay (southern portion) was granted in 1843 by Governor Micheltorena to Francisco Badillo. In 1844, John (Juan) D. Wilson and James (Diego) G. Scott bought Rancho Cañada de Los Osos from Linares and Rancho Pecho y Islay from Badillo. In 1845, the two ranchos were combined, thus forming Rancho Cañada de Los Osos y Pecho y Islay.

Captain John Wilson (1797–1861), a Scottish-born sea captain and trader, came to California in 1837 with his business partner, James Scott (?-1851), also a native of Scotland. In 1837, Wilson married María Ramona Carrillo de Pacheco (1812–1888), widow of José Antonio Romualdo Pacheco, who was killed at the Battle of Cahuenga Pass in 1831. Carrillo was a daughter of María Ygnacia López de Carrillo, the grantee of Rancho Cabeza de Santa Rosa, and María's sister married General Mariano Guadalupe Vallejo. María Ramona Carrillo de Pacheco was also the grantee of Rancho Suey. Wilson and his business partner, James Scott, owned Rancho Los Guilicos in Sonoma County and Rancho El Chorro and Rancho Cañada de los Osos y Pecho y Islay in San Luis Obispo County. Wilson alone also bought Rancho San Luisito and Rancho Huerta de Romualdo. In 1845, Wilson moved his family from San Luis Obispo to Rancho Cañada de los Osos y Pecho y Islay, built an adobe home, and lived there until his death in 1860.

With the cession of California to the United States following the Mexican–American War, the 1848 Treaty of Guadalupe Hidalgo provided that the land grants would be honored. As required by the Land Act of 1851, a claim for Rancho Cañada de los Osos y Pecho y Islay was filed with the Public Land Commission in 1852, and the grant was patented to John Wilson in 1869.

The rancho was inherited by Wilson's wife, Ramona Carrillo Wilson and their daughter, Ramona Hilliard (1839–1912), who married Frederick Hilliard (1822–1890) in 1862. Ramona Carrillo Wilson died in 1888. In 1891, Ramona Hilliard sold the southern portion of the Pecho y Islay ranch to Luigi Marre (1841–1902), and continued to operate the northern portion as leased land. Alden Spooner Jr. first leased in 1892. In 1901, Henry Cowell of San Francisco acquired a note of indebtedness on the Hilliard property and took control of the remaining Pecho ranch. In 1902, Alden Spooner Jr. bought it from Cowell's widow. Oliver C. Field acquired the Spooner ranch in 1942. Field sold it to Irene McAllister about ten years later. The State of California acquired the McAllister property for Montaña de Oro State Park in 1965. The Marre property was leased by Pacific Gas and Electric Company for the Diablo Canyon Power Plant.

== Historic sites of the Rancho ==
- Wilson adobe. Built by Captain John Wilson in 1845. Located on Los Osos Valley Road near its intersection with Turri Road.
- Spooner's Ranch House.

== See also ==
- Baywood-Los Osos, California
- Los Osos, California
- Los Osos Oaks State Natural Reserve
- Montaña de Oro State Park
- Ranchos of San Luis Obispo County, California
- List of ranchos of California
