= Rancho El Chorro =

Mexican land grant

Coordinates: 35.340°N 120.710°W

Rancho El Chorro (also called Rancho Cañada del Chorro) was a 3,167-acre (12.82 km^{2}) Mexican land grant in present day San Luis Obispo County, California given in 1845 by Governor Pío Pico to business partners James (Diego) Scott and John (Juan) Wilson. The grant between Morro Bay and San Luis Obispo extended along the north bank of Chorro Creek.

== History ==
Captain John Wilson (1798-1861), a Scottish-born sea captain and trader, came to California in 1830. In 1837 Wilson married María Ramona Carrillo de Pacheco (1812 –1888), widow of José Antonio Romualdo Pacheco, who was killed at the Battle of Cahuenga Pass in 1831. Maria Carrillo was a daughter of María Ygnacia López de Carrillo, the grantee of Rancho Cabeza de Santa Rosa, and María's sister married General Mariano Guadalupe Vallejo. María Ramona Carrillo de Pacheco was the grantee of Rancho Suey. James G. Scott (–1851), also a native of Scotland, came to California with his business partner Captain Wilson.

Wilson and Scott also owned Rancho Los Guilicos in Sonoma County, and Rancho Cañada de los Osos y Pecho y Islay. They were granted the one-square-league Rancho El Chorro in 1845. Wilson also bought Rancho San Luisito and Rancho Huerta de Romualdo. In 1845, Wilson moved his family from San Luis Obispo to Rancho Cañada de los Osos & Pacheco y Islay, built an adobe home and lived there until his death in 1860.

With the cession of California to the United States following the Mexican–American War, the 1848 Treaty of Guadalupe Hidalgo provided that the land grants would be honored. As required by the Land Act of 1851, a claim for Rancho El Chorro was filed with the Public Land Commission in 1852, and the grant was patented to John Wilson in 1871.

After the 1862-4 drought, Rancho El Chorro was sold to William Welles Hollister in 1865.

== Historic sites of the Rancho ==
- Vasquez–Hollister adobe. Adobe built between the years 1800 and 1830.

== See also ==
- Ranchos of California
- List of ranchos of California
