= Rancho Suey =

Land grant in California

Coordinates: 34.990°N 120.360°W

Rancho Suey was a 48,834-acre (197.62 km^{2}) Mexican land grant in present-day southern San Luis Obispo County and northern Santa Barbara County, California given in 1837 by Governor Juan B. Alvarado to María Ramona Carrillo de Pacheco. The grant was east of present-day Santa Maria and extended along the San Luis Obispo-Santa Barbara County line, and between the Santa Maria River and the Cuyama River.

== History ==
Captain José Antonio Romualdo Pacheco (–1831), came from Mexico to California in 1825, and served as an aide to Governor José María de Echeandía. In 1826, Pacheco married María Ramona Carrillo de Pacheco (1812–1888), a daughter of María Ygnacia López de Carrillo, the grantee of Rancho Cabeza de Santa Rosa. María Ramona Carrillo was a sister-in-law of General Mariano Guadalupe Vallejo. Pacheco died defending the widely despised centralist Mexican governor of California, Manuel Victoria, at the Battle of Cahuenga Pass in 1831.

His widow, María Ramona Carrillo de Pacheco was given the five-square-league Rancho Suey land grant by Governor Alvarado in 1837. In 1837, she married Captain John Wilson (1797–1861), a Scottish-born sea captain and trader, who came to California in 1830. John (Juan) Wilson raised Pacheco's son Jose Antonio Romualdo Jr. Wilson was the grantee of Rancho Los Guilicos in Sonoma County. Wilson and his business partner, James Scott (-1851), also owned Rancho El Chorro and Rancho Cañada de los Osos y Pecho y Islay. In 1845, Wilson built an adobe home on Rancho Cañada de los Osos y Pecho y Islay and lived there with his family until his death in 1860.

With the cession of California to the United States following the Mexican–American War, the 1848 Treaty of Guadalupe Hidalgo provided that the land grants would be honored. As required by the Land Act of 1851, a claim for Rancho Suey was filed with the Public Land Commission in 1852, and the grant was patented to María Ramona Carrillo de Wilson in 1865. The Ranch was purchased by Norris M. Roberts from Maria Wilson. He later sold it to Henry Newhall on his return to England.

In 1875 Henry Mayo Newhall bought Rancho Suey sight unseen, and it became part of the Newhall Land and Farming Company. Newhall Land sold the ranch in 1999; it is currently owned by H.D. and Carol Perrett.

== See also ==
- Ranchos of California
- List of ranchos of California
