= Rancho Cañada de Los Osos =

Land grant in California

Coordinates: 35.260°N 120.840°W

Rancho Cañada de los Osos (Valley of the Bears) was a 23,574.2-acre (95.401 km^{2}) Mexican land grant in Los Osos Valley in present-day San Luis Obispo County, California.

Rancho Cañada de Los Osos was granted by Governor Juan B. Alvarado to Victor Linares, in 1842. The Cañada de Los Osos grant extended from the Pacific Coast, along Los Osos Creek and the Los Osos Valley to almost present-day San Luis Obispo, and southward encompassed, Los Osos, Montaña de Oro State Park north of Islay Creek and the northern Irish Hills.

== History ==
Rancho Cañada de Los Osos was granted in 1842 by Governor Alvarado to Victor Linares. Linares had lived at San Luis Obispo since 1839, when he had been a majordomo of the Mission and a militia commander. At the same time he acquired Rancho Cañada de Los Osos, he sold his grant of Rancho Tinaquaic.

In 1844 John (Juan) D. Wilson and James (Diego) G. Scott bought Rancho Canada de Los Osos from Linares and the Rancho Pecho y Islay, south of Rancho Cañada de Los Osos, which had been granted in 1843 by Governor Manuel Micheltorena to Francisco Badillo.

In 1845 the Canada de Los Osos rancho in the north was combined with Rancho Pecho y Islay to the south, thus forming Rancho Cañada de los Osos y Pecho y Islay, consolidated in the 1845 grant of Rancho Cañada de los Osos y Pecho y Islay by Governor Pío Pico, to James Scott and John Wilson.

== See also ==
- Baywood-Los Osos, California
- Los Osos, California
- Los Osos Oaks State Natural Reserve
- Montaña de Oro State Park
- Ranchos of San Luis Obispo County, California
- List of Ranchos of California
