= Romualdo Pacheco =

Governor of California in 1875

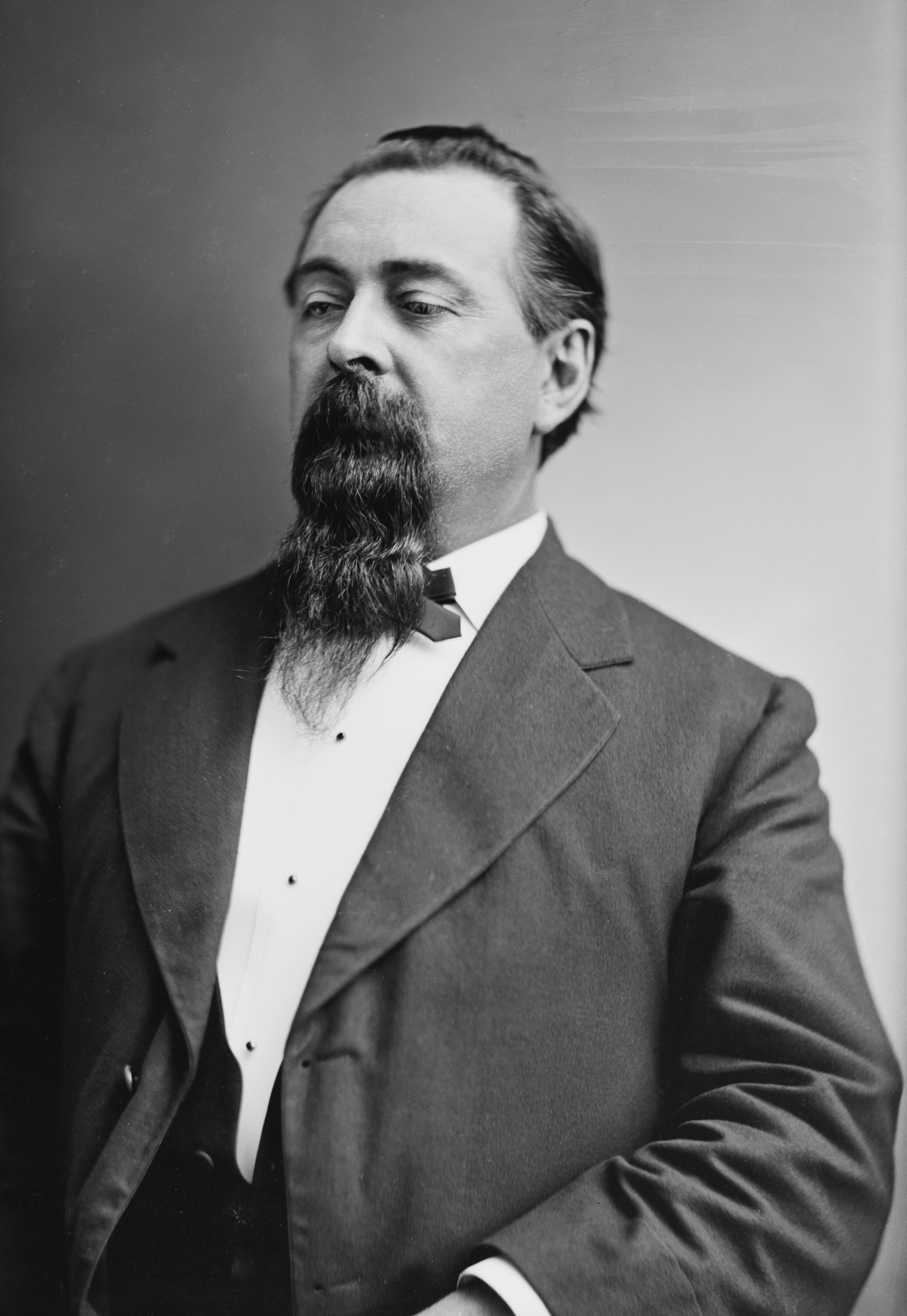
- Portrait by Brady c. 1877–1880

12th Governor of California
- In office February 27, 1875 – December 9, 1875
- Lieutenant: William Irwin (acting)
- Preceded by: Newton Booth
- Succeeded by: William Irwin

12th Lieutenant Governor of California
- In office December 8, 1871 – February 27, 1875
- Governor: Newton Booth
- Preceded by: William Holden
- Succeeded by: William Irwin (acting)

7th Treasurer of California
- In office October 10, 1863 – December 7, 1867
- Governor: Leland Stanford; Frederick Low
- Preceded by: Delos R. Ashley
- Succeeded by: Antonio F. Coronel

Member of the U.S. House of Representatives from California's 4th district
- In office March 4, 1879 – March 4, 1883
- Preceded by: Peter D. Wigginton
- Succeeded by: Pleasant B. Tully
- In office March 4, 1877 – February 7, 1878
- Preceded by: Peter D. Wigginton
- Succeeded by: Peter D. Wigginton

Member of the California Senate
- In office January 7, 1869 – October 6, 1871
- Preceded by: Patrick W. Murphy
- Succeeded by: James Van Ness
- Constituency: 3rd district
- In office January 7, 1861 – December 7, 1863
- Preceded by: John H. Watson
- Succeeded by: Juan Y. Cot
- Constituency: 3rd district
- In office January 4, 1858 – January 2, 1860
- Preceded by: Pablo de la Guerra
- Succeeded by: Pablo de la Guerra
- Constituency: 2nd district
Diplomatic offices
United States Minister to Nicaragua
In office May 21, 1891 – October 13, 1891
President	Benjamin Harrison
Preceded by	Lansing B. Mizner
Succeeded by	Richard C. Shannon
United States Minister to Costa Rica
In office May 7, 1891 – October 31, 1891
President	Benjamin Harrison
Preceded by	Lansing B. Mizner
Succeeded by	Richard C. Shannon
United States Minister to Honduras
In office April 17, 1891 – June 12, 1893
President	Benjamin Harrison; Grover Cleveland
Preceded by	Lansing B. Mizner
Succeeded by	Pierce M. B. Young
United States Minister to El Salvador
In office March 28, 1891 – November 14, 1891
President	Benjamin Harrison
Preceded by	Lansing B. Mizner
Succeeded by	Richard C. Shannon
United States Minister to Guatemala
In office February 28, 1891 – June 12, 1893
President	Benjamin Harrison
Preceded by	Lansing B. Mizner
Succeeded by	Pierce M. B. Young

Personal details
- Born: José Antonio Romualdo Pacheco; October 31, 1831 Santa Barbara, Alta California, Mexico
- Died: January 23, 1899 (aged 67) Oakland, California, United States
- Resting place: Mountain View Cemetery, Oakland
- Party: Democratic (before 1860); National Union (1860–1868); Republican (after 1868); People's Independent (1875)
- Spouse: Mary McIntire (m. 1863)
- Children: 2
- Relatives: José Antonio Romualdo Pacheco (father); María Ramona Carrillo de Pacheco (mother); María Ygnacia López de Carrillo (grandmother); Francisca Benicia Carrillo de Vallejo (aunt); Mariano Guadalupe Vallejo (uncle); Pablo de la Guerra (cousin)

Military service
- Allegiance: United States
- Branch/service: United States Army
- Rank: Brigadier General
- Battles/wars: American Civil War

José Antonio Romualdo Pacheco (October 31, 1831 – January 23, 1899) was a Californio statesman and diplomat. He is best known as the first Hispanic person to serve as governor of California following the American Conquest of California, and as the first Latino to represent a state in the U.S. Congress. A Republican, Pacheco was elected and appointed to various state, federal, and diplomatic offices throughout his more than thirty-year career, including serving as a California State Treasurer, California State Senator, and three terms in the U.S. House of Representatives. He was elected California Lieutenant Governor in 1871, then became governor when elected governor Newton Booth ran successfully for election to the U.S. Senate in 1875. Pacheco served the remainder of Booth's term as governor, becoming the 12th governor of California, but did not run for election to that office. Pacheco was the first U.S. governor of California to be born in California.

== Early life ==
José Antonio Romualdo Pacheco was a Californio, born in Santa Barbara, California, to a family with prominent connections. His father, José Antonio Romualdo Pacheco, had moved to Alta California from Guanajuato in 1825, and served as an aide to José María de Echeandía during his tenure as governor of Alta California. Pacheco's father was killed at the Battle of Cahuenga Pass in 1831, when the young Romualdo was just five weeks old. His father had shot José María Avila, who had attacked Alta California Governor Manuel Victoria with a lance, but died when Avila's lance struck him.

His mother, María Ramona Carrillo de Pacheco, was a sister-in-law of General Mariano Guadalupe Vallejo and a daughter of María Ygnacia López de Carrillo, the grantee of Rancho Cabeza de Santa Rosa. After the death of his father, Romualdo's mother married Captain John D. Wilson, a Scotsman, who sent Pacheco to Honolulu, Hawaii, for his education.

At age twelve, Pacheco began an apprenticeship aboard a trading vessel. The Mexican–American War broke out two years later, and he was briefly held by American forces during the Conquest of California while on one trip in July 1846, as he brought cargo to Yerba Buena (modern day San Francisco). The ship he was on was searched, and he made an oath of allegiance to the United States and was released.

== Politics ==
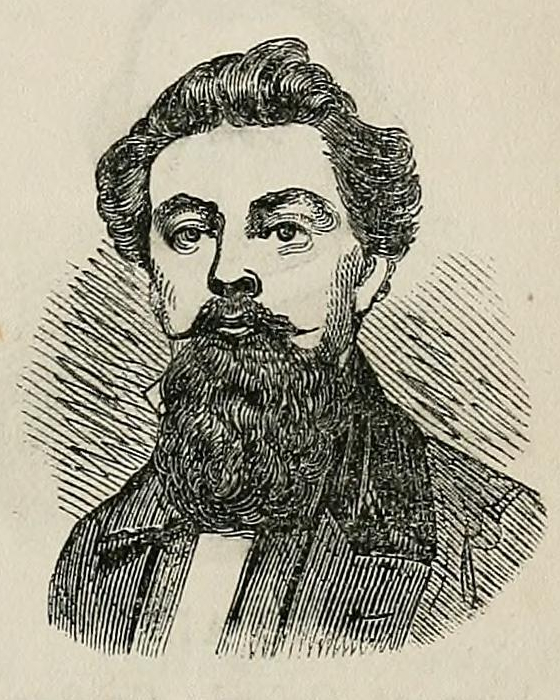
Engraving of Pacheco published 1858

Pacheco's association with a prominent family in the state helped him to gain support as he entered politics in the 1850s. He was also well respected by Anglos coming into the area. Early in his political career in the 1850s, he was a Democrat. He became affiliated with the National Union Party in the 1860s, but was elected to most of his positions as a candidate for the Republican Party.

In 1853, at age 22, Pacheco successfully sought the position of Judge in San Luis Obispo County. Pacheco was elected to the State Senate in 1857, succeeded his cousin Pablo de la Guerra. At 27 years old, he was the youngest member of the legislature. He was re-elected two times, serving until 1863. During the American Civil War Pacheco was appointed the rank of brigadier general by Governor Leland Stanford and directed to disarm military companies in the Los Angeles area that were not loyal to the Union.

Pacheco served as State Treasurer from 1863 to 1867, then returned to the State Senate until he was elected Lieutenant Governor in 1871. He served as Lieutenant Governor of California under Newton Booth until Booth was elected to the United States Senate in 1873 and took office in 1875. Pacheco then served as Governor from February 27 to December 9, 1875, when Lieutenant Governor William Irwin, winner in the September elections that year, was inaugurated. Pacheco, having been denied the Republican nomination for Governor, instead ran for Lieutenant Governor on the People's Independent ticket alongside John Bidwell.

"The Pacheco-Wigginton Contest: The Former Vaquero Lassoes the Prise Steer 'Congress' by Supreme Court Decision," a caricature of Pacheco and Peter D. Wigginton published in Thistleton's Illustrated Jolly Giant, March 31, 1877

After his brief tenure as governor, Pacheco ran for a U.S. House seat in 1876, defeating incumbent Peter D. Wigginton by just one vote. California Secretary of State Thomas Beck refused to certify the election due to the revelation that two votes cast for Wigginton in Monterey County were not counted. Pacheco contested this and brought the case all the way to the Supreme Court of California, where it was found that the tally clerk had indeed removed two votes after California’s Board of Elections had adjourned. However, the court found that this was done to account for a clerical error in the vote totals, legitimizing Pacheco’s win in the election.

He was sworn into office on October 17, 1877, in spite of the efforts made to block his taking of the oath of office on the basis of Wigginton’s contestation made by the Democrat-controlled Congress. The House Committee on Elections found on January 31, 1878 that while the State Supreme Court’s ruling regarding the two votes removed for Wigginton in Monterey was valid, they argued that because of irregularities in ballots outside of Monterey County, dozens of votes for both candidates were invalid. State law gave precinct judges the authority to throw out ballots for having extraneous markings. They also claimed that many ballots were cast by voters who were not residents of the state or districts. The committee ruled that Wigginton won by a 4 vote margin. The full house concurred in a partisan vote of 136 to 125, thus removing Pacheco from his seat of February 7, 1878.

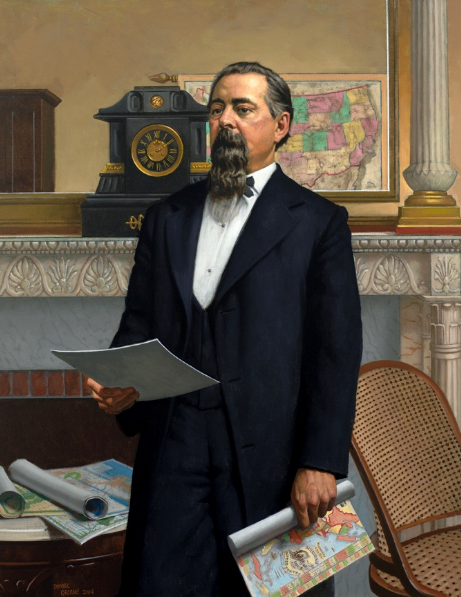
Official portrait in the U.S. House of Representatives

Pacheco ran again in 1879, winning with 40% of the votes, which was more than either the Democrat Wallace Leach or the independent candidate James Joseph Ayers. His win was due in large part to his ability to appeal to "the Spanish Vote" by campaigning in both English and Spanish. He was reelected in 1880, winning with 46% of the vote, narrowly defeating Leach by 191 votes.

During his first term, he was a member of three standing committees: Public Lands, Private Land Claims, and Public Expenditures. Romualdo preferred working in these smaller committees to speaking in front of the entire house. He focused his legislative efforts on improving the harbors and railroads in his district. Because the House of Representatives was controlled by Democrats at the time, he failed to get his legislation through Congress.

Because of his experience in the field, when the GOP took control of the House, they named Pacheco Chairman of the Committee on Private Land Claims.

In 1882, he broke from his silence on national issues when he argued in favor of the Chinese Exclusion Act, citing concerns that Chinese immigrants who worked in mines and on railroads in California were stealing the jobs of White Americans and degrading the morality of Chinese cities. The bill was passed as Pacheco joined the 60 Republicans as well as all the Californian representatives in voting in the affirmative.

== Diplomacy and death ==
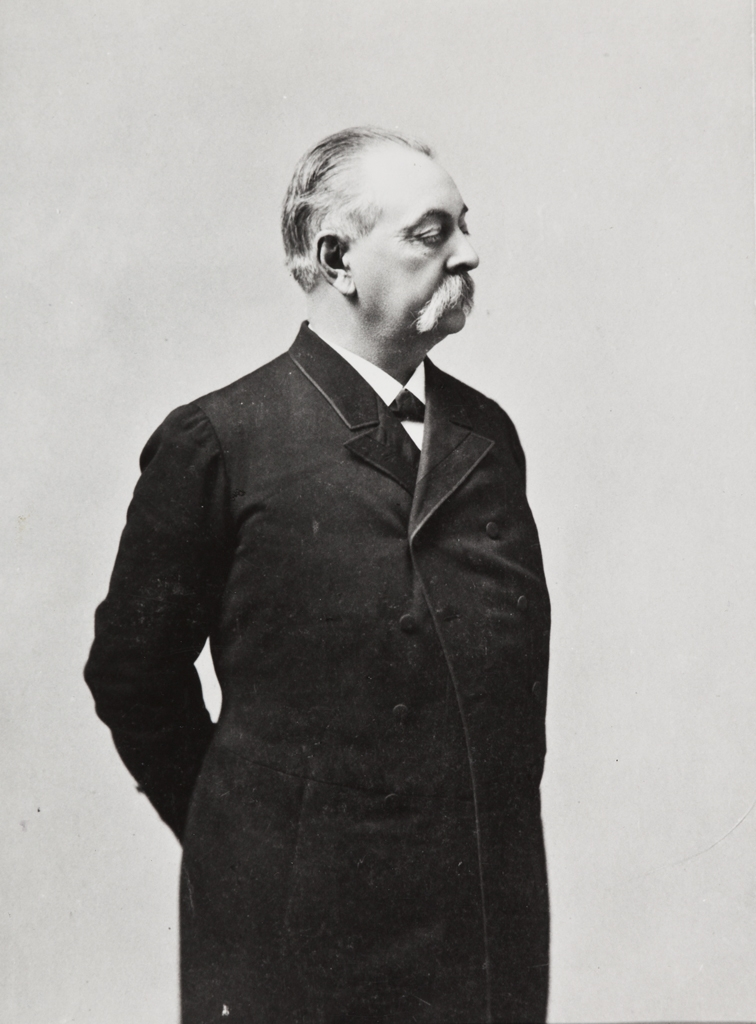
Pacheco in the 1890s

After leaving Congress, Pacheco lived on a cattle ranch in the northern Mexican state of Coahuila for five years until he was appointed as U.S. Minister to various countries in Central America in 1890. Beginning in February 1891, Pacheco served as Minister to Guatemala, a post that he held until June 1893. From May 21 to October 13, 1891, Pacheco simultaneously served as U.S. Minister to Guatemala, Costa Rica, El Salvador, Honduras, and Nicaragua.

At the conclusion of his diplomatic service, Pacheco returned to California, and he died in Oakland, at the home of his brother-in-law, in 1899. He is buried in Mountain View Cemetery.

== Personal life ==
On October 31, 1863, he married Mary McIntire, a 22-year-old playwright. They had two children, Maybella Ramona and Romualdo.

== Legacy ==
Pacheco was the first Hispanic governor of California, with Xavier Becerra becoming the second following the 2026 election. He is also remembered for being the first Latino to represent a state in the U.S. House of Representatives. Latinos had served as non-voting delegates of territories before, but Pacheco was the first Latino member of Congress with full voting rights.

He was the last Hispanic Republican elected to represent California in the U.S. Congress until Mike Garcia was elected to represent the 25th district in a special election in May 2020, although Frank Coombs, whose mother was Mexican, was a Republican U.S. representative from California from 1901 to 1903, and Mexican-American U.S. Representative Matthew G. Martínez switched from the Democratic Party to the Republican Party on July 27, 2000 and served in Congress as a Republican until his term concluded on January 3, 2001.

Romualdo Pacheco was the last Latino governor in the United States until Bill Richardson, who served as governor of New Mexico from 2002 to 2011.

== Gallery ==
Pacheco in the 1860s

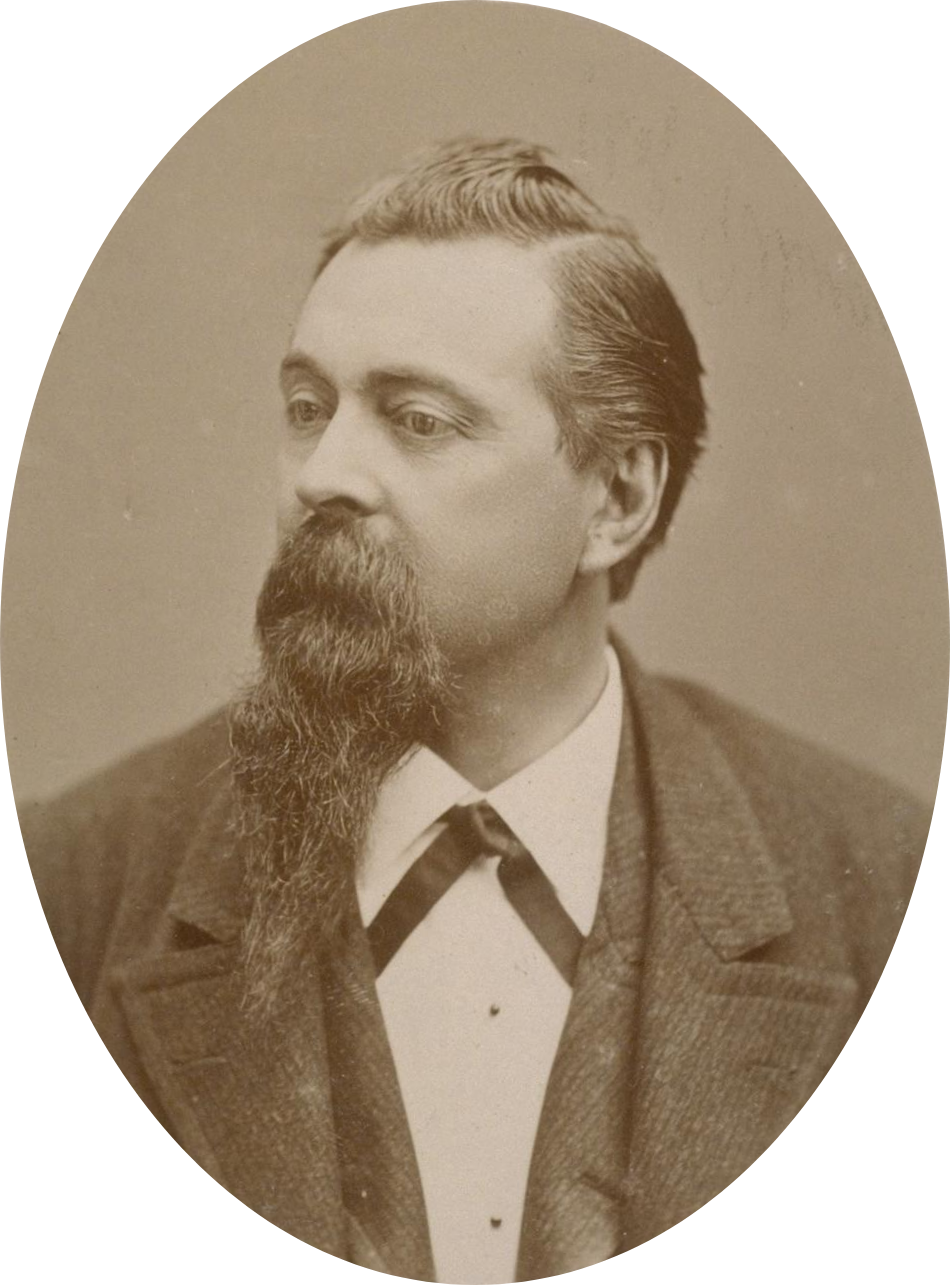
Pacheco c. 1870s

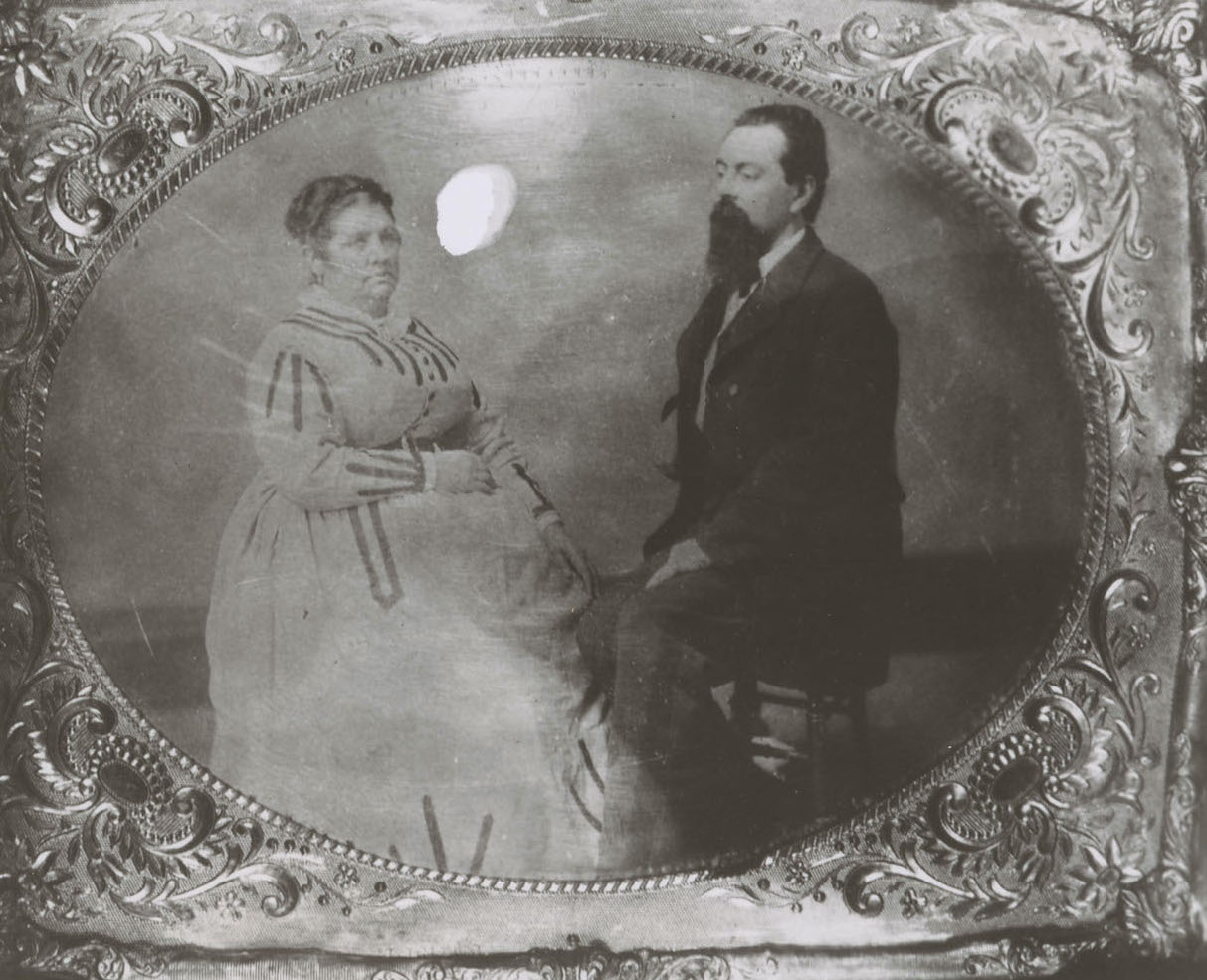
Pacheco with his aunt Francisca Benicia Carrillo de Vallejo

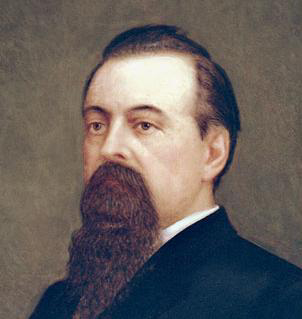
Pacheco's official gubernatorial portrait

== See also ==
- List of governors of California
- Hispanic and Latino conservatism in the United States
- List of Hispanic and Latino Americans in the United States Congress
- List of minority governors and lieutenant governors in the United States

== Sources ==
- Nicholson, Loren (1990). Romualdo Pacheco's California!. San Luis Obispo: California Heritage Publishing Associates. ISBN 0-9623233-2-2.
- Ronald Genini & Richard Hitchman, Romualdo Pacheco: A Californio in Two Eras, The Book Club of California:1985. LC Control#86101529

Political offices
Preceded by Delos R. Ashley	Treasurer of California; 1863–1867	Succeeded by Antonio F. Coronel
Preceded by William Holden	Lieutenant Governor of California; 1871–1875	Succeeded by William Irwin (Acting)
Preceded by Newton Booth	Governor of California; 1875	Succeeded by William Irwin (Acting)
U.S. House of Representatives
Preceded by Peter D. Wigginton	Member of the U.S. House of Representatives from California's 4th congressional district 1877–1878	Succeeded by Peter D. Wigginton
Preceded by Peter D. Wigginton	Member of the U.S. House of Representatives from California's 4th congressional district 1879–1883	Succeeded by Pleasant B. Tully
Preceded by Thomas M. Gunter	Chair of the House Private Land Claims Committee; 1881–1883	Succeeded by Henry L. Muldrow
Diplomatic posts
Preceded by Lansing B. Mizner	United States Minister to Guatemala; 1891–1893	Succeeded by Pierce M. B. Young
Preceded by Lansing B. Mizner	United States Minister to Honduras; 1891–1893	Succeeded by Pierce M. B. Young
Preceded by Lansing B. Mizner	United States Minister to El Salvador; 1891	Succeeded by Richard C. Shannon
Preceded by Lansing B. Mizner	United States Minister to Costa Rica; 1891	Succeeded by Richard C. Shannon
Preceded by Lansing B. Mizner	United States Minister to Nicaragua; 1891	Succeeded by Richard C. Shannon
