= Rancho Los Guilicos =

Mexican land grant in California

Coordinates: 38.44°N 122.58°W

Rancho Los Guilicos was an 18,834-acre (76.22 km^{2}) Mexican land grant in present-day Sonoma County, California given in 1837 by Governor Juan B. Alvarado to John (Juan) Wilson. The grant extended along Sonoma Creek, south of Santa Rosa from Santa Rosa Creek south to almost Glen Ellen, and encompassed present day Oakmont, Kenwood and Annadel State Park.

== History ==
The four square league grant was made to Captain John Wilson (1797–1861), a Scottish-born sea captain and trader, who came to California in 1830. In 1837 Wilson married María Ramona Carrillo de Pacheco (1812–1888), widow of José Antonio Romualdo Pacheco, who was killed at the Battle of Cahuenga Pass in 1831. Carrillo, was a daughter of María Ygnacia López de Carrillo, the grantee of Rancho Cabeza de Santa Rosa. María's sister married General Mariano Guadalupe Vallejo. María Ramona Carrillo de Pacheco was also the grantee of Rancho Suey. Wilson and his business partner, James Scott (–1851), also owned Rancho El Chorro and Rancho Cañada de los Osos y Pecho y Islay in San Luis Obispo County. In 1845, Wilson moved his family from San Luis Obispo to Rancho Cañada de los Osos & Pacheco y Islay, built an adobe home and lived there until he died in 1860.

With the cession of California to the United States following the Mexican–American War, the 1848 Treaty of Guadalupe Hidalgo provided that the land grants would be honored. As required by the Land Act of 1851, a claim for Rancho Los Guilicos was filed with the Public Land Commission in 1852, and the grant was patented to John Wilson in 1886.

Wilson never occupied Rancho Los Guilicos, and in 1850, sold the rancho to William Hood and William Pettit. Scotsman William Hood (1818–) had come to San Francisco by way of Chile. As the son of a ship builder he'd learned the trade and became a cabinet maker before embarking on his international travel. Hood set up a carpentry business in San Francisco and, sometime around 1846, traveled to north of San Francisco. Reaching the Los Rancho Los Guilicos he climbed the mountain later named after him. Looking down to the countryside below, Hood was impressed with the valley and its potential and resolved to make enough money to purchase the property from Wilson. When gold was discovered in 1848, demand for housing in San Francisco made Hood wealthier than most of the men who'd run off to the gold fields. By 1850, he had earned enough money to purchase a half share in Los Guilicos. The terms of the partnership with William Pettit are unclear. Pettit sold his half of the ranch to Amelia Wilson less than a year later. Together, Hood and Wilson hired James Shaw as ranch foreman. Amelia eventually sold her share to Hood around 1854, giving him sole ownership of the property. Some documents claim that when Hood first purchased the property, he lived in an old adobe. This adobe was a remnant of the few improvements Captain Wilson made during his period of stewardship. Needless to say, nothing from this early period has been discovered.

In 1849, William Hudson (1813–1866 ) and his brother Martin Hudson (1807–1871), from Virginia, bought 2,500 acres (10 km^{2}) and engaged in raising wheat and stock.

Irishman Captain John Hamilton Drummond (1830–1889), who served in the British army, came to California in 1877, purchased part of the rancho and engaged in sheep raising and viticulture. In 1890, the Drummond Ranch was purchased by Mary Ellen Pleasant.

U.S. Senator Thomas Kearns of Utah bought the property in 1905 and added other properties to increase the size to 1,800 acres. Kearns entertained his friend President Theodore Roosevelt and used the property as an investment and vacation property until just before he died in 1918. The site of the Los Guilicos Rancho in "Valley of the Moon" was formerly part of Senator Kearns' ranch and was the setting for part of a Jack London novel The Valley of the Moon (1913) wherein his heroine exclaimed, "We have found our Valley!"

== Historic sites of the Rancho ==
William Hood House was constructed in 1858 by William Hood for his bride, Eliza Shaw of Sonoma.
