= Rancho Huerta de Romualdo =

Land grant in California

Coordinates: 35.320°N 120.720°W

Rancho Huerta de Romualdo was a 117-acre (0.47 km^{2}) Mexican land grant in present-day San Luis Obispo County, California given in 1842 by Governor Juan B. Alvarado and in 1846 by Governor Pío Pico to Romualdo. The name means Romualdo's vegetable garden. The grant between Morro Bay and San Luis Obispo, extended along Chorro Creek and encompassed Cerro Romauldo.

== History ==
The one-tenth square league to Romualdo, a Chumash Indian. In 1846 Romualdo sold his land to Captain John Wilson (1797–1861), owner of the adjacent Rancho El Chorro, Rancho San Luisito and Rancho Cañada de los Osos y Pecho y Islay.

With the cession of California to the United States following the Mexican-American War, the 1848 Treaty of Guadalupe Hidalgo provided that the land grants would be honored. As required by the Land Act of 1851, a claim for Rancho Huerta de Romualdo was filed with the Public Land Commission in 1852, and the grant was patented to John Wilson in 1871.

== See also ==
- Ranchos of California
- List of Ranchos of California
