= Rancho Pecho y Islay =

Land grant in California

Coordinates: 35.260°N 120.840°W

Rancho Pecho y Islay was an 8,856.8-acre (35.842 km^{2}) Mexican land grant in the Irish Hills, Montaña de Oro State Park and Diablo Canyon Power Plant in present-day San Luis Obispo County, California.

== History ==
Rancho Pecho y Islay was granted in 1843 by Governor Manuel Micheltorena to Francisco Badillo. The Rancho Pecho y Islay grant was a strip of coastal plain along the Pacific Ocean that ran from Islay Creek to Pecho Creek and up that creek to the summit of the Irish Hills to the "boundary with the land of Don Victor Linares," (Rancho Cañada de los Osos). It includes the southern part of Montaña de Oro State Park and the site of the Diablo Canyon Power Plant.

The Rancho Pecho y Islay was sold by Francisco Badillo in 1844 to James Scott and John Wilson. That year they also purchased the Rancho Cañada de los Osos from Victor Linares. The grants were consolidated in the 1845 grant of Rancho Cañada de los Osos y Pecho y Islay by Governor Pío Pico, to James Scott and John Wilson, after they had been purchased from the original grantees.

With the cession of California to the United States following the Mexican-American War, the 1848 Treaty of Guadalupe Hidalgo provided that the land grants would be honored. As required by the Land Act of 1851, a claim for Rancho Cañada de los Osos y Pecho y Islay was filed with the Public Land Commission in 1852, and the grant was patented to John Wilson in 1869.

The rancho was inherited by Wilson's wife, Ramona Carrillo Wilson and their daughter, Ramona Hilliard (1839–1912), who married Frederick Hilliard (1822–1890) in 1862. Ramona Carrillo Wilson died in 1888. In 1891, Ramona Hilliard sold the southern portion of the Pecho y Islay ranch to Luigi Marre (1841–1902).

After Marre's death, his sons continued the operations as the Luigi Marre Land and Cattle Company. The Marre land was leased to Pacific Gas and Electric Company in the 1960s and 1970s for the construction of the Diablo Canyon Power Plant.

== See also ==
- Montaña de Oro State Park
- Ranchos of San Luis Obispo County, California
- List of Ranchos of California
