= Carrillo Adobe =

Carillo Adobe may refer to:

- Hill–Carrillo Adobe, Santa Barbara, California, also known as "Carrillo Adobe"
- Carrillo Adobe (Santa Rosa, California), associated with María Ygnacia López de Carrillo
