= 1871 California lieutenant gubernatorial election =

- September 6, 1871
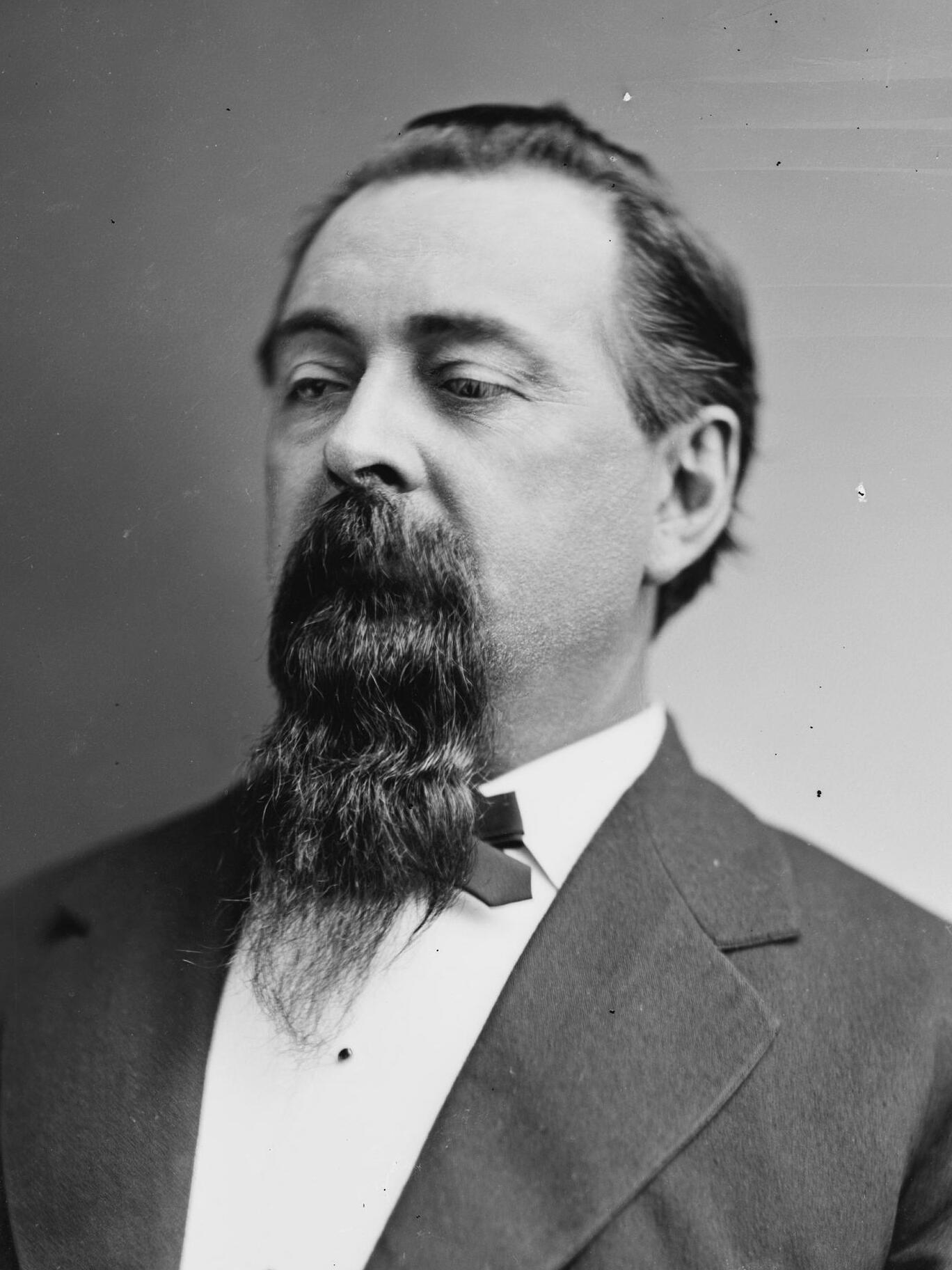

Nominee	Romualdo Pacheco	Edward J. Lewis
Party	Republican	Democratic
Popular vote	62,555	57,397
Percentage	52.15%	47.85%
- County results Pacheco: 50–60% 60–70% Lewis: 50–60% 60–70% 70–80% 80–90%
Lieutenant Governor before election
William Holden
Democratic
Elected Lieutenant Governor
Romualdo Pacheco
Republican

The 1871 California lieutenant gubernatorial election was held on September 6, 1871, in order to elect the lieutenant governor of California. Republican nominee and incumbent California State Treasurer Romualdo Pacheco defeated Democratic nominee and incumbent President pro tempore of the California State Senate Edward J. Lewis.

== General election ==
On election day, September 6, 1871, Republican nominee Romualdo Pacheco won the election by a margin of 5,158 votes against his opponent Democratic nominee Edward J. Lewis, thereby gaining Republican control over the office of lieutenant governor. Pacheco was sworn in as the 12th lieutenant governor of California on December 8, 1871.

=== Results ===
California lieutenant gubernatorial election, 1871
Party	Candidate	Votes	%
Republican	Romualdo Pacheco	62,555	52.15
Democratic	Edward J. Lewis	57,397	47.85
Total votes		119,952	100.00
Republican gain from Democratic			
