= Fort Romualdo Pacheco =

Spanish fort in present-day Imperial County, California

- Interactive map of Fort Romualdo Pacheco
- 32.84472222°N 115.692244444°W
- Location: West Bank of New River, 6 miles West of Imperial, California

History
- Built: 1825
- Demolished: 1826

California Historical Landmark
- Designated: September 15, 1981
- Reference no.: 944

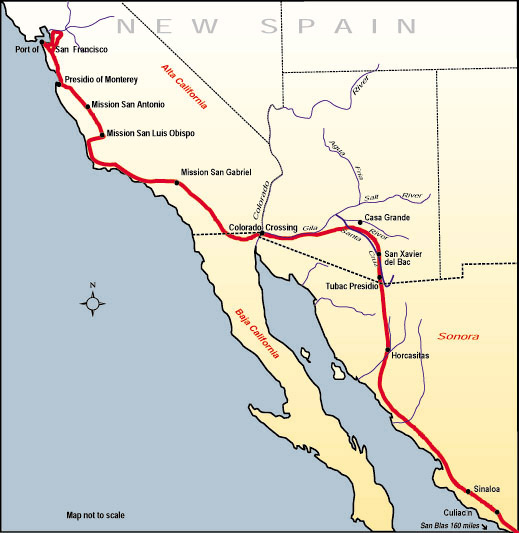
Map of the route, Juan Bautista de Anza travelled in 1775–1776 from Mexico to today's San Francisco via the Gila River corridor and the Yuma Crossing of the Colorado River.

Fort Romualdo Pacheco also called Fuerte de Laguna Chapala was a Mexican (Mexico consumed his independence in 1821 from Spain) fort built in 1825 and was abandoned a year later in 1826. The fort was 100 feet square with thick stone and adobe walls. The fort was built by Lieutenant Alfrez Jose Antonio Romualdo Pacheco Sr. in response to attacks on travelers on the route made by Juan Bautista de Anza's expedition in 1774 from Sonora to Alta California. The fort was built after Fernando Rivera y Moncada, many of his soldiers, Francisco Garcés and his local missionaries, were killed at Mission San Pedro y San Pablo de Bicuñer in that is called the Yuma Revolt or Yuma Massacre on July 18, 1781. The attack was by the Apache Quechan Indians. The Yuma Massacre closed the overland transportation between northern Mexico and Alta California for 50 years. This halted the migration of Mexicans to Alta California. Lieutenant Pacheco with soldiers and cavalry from the Presidio de San Diego built the fort in later 1825 and early 1826. The fort was built just north of the New River and south of the Bull Head Slough in what is now Imperial, California. The Fort was only used for a few months in 1826. Pacheco returned to San Diego and put Ignacio Delgado in charge of the Fort. On April 26, 1826, the San Sebastián Kumeyaay Indians attacked the fort. Pacheco had heard about rumors of the attack and arrived during the attack with reinforcements from San Diego. Pacheco and his 25 lancers fought off the attack. In the battle, three soldiers were killed and three injured. In the battle, 28 Indians were killed. But, now the fort was surrounded by many Kumeyaay and Quechan warriors. Vastly outnumbered the Fort was abandoned and all returned to San Diego. Archeologists did digs at the site in 1958 before Imperial Valley College Museum removed the remains.

== California Historical Landmark ==
The site of the former fort is a California Historical Landmark number 944.

The California Historical Landmark reads:

NO. 944 SITE OF FORT ROMUALDO PACHECO - In 1774, Spain opened an overland route from Sonora to California but it was closed by Yuma Indians in 1781. In 1822, Mexico attempted to reopen this route. Lt. Romualdo Pacheco and soldiers built an adobe fort at this site in 1825-26, the only Mexican fort in Alta California. On April 26, 1826, Kumeyaay Indians attacked the fort, killing three soldiers and wounding three others. Pacheco abandoned the fort, removing soldiers to San Diego.

== Yuma Massacre ==
The Yuma Massacre or Yuma Revolt were a series of attacks on New Spain in 1781 by Yumas Indians. The trail made by Juan Bautista de Anza's expedition in 1774 from Mexico to South California was called the El Camino del Diablo, or the Road of the Devil. The journey was difficult though the Sonoran Desert. The Spanish initially had a peaceful relations with Quechans, also called Yumas. But in 1781 the Yumas revolted. Francisco Garcés had made connections with the Yumas and had become their priest. Garcés and the leader of the Yumas, Salvador Palma aka Olleyquotequiebe, had a good relationship. But, General Teodoro de Croix broke the peace by building two pueblos towns on the Yumas land. Croix did not work with Garcés and no outreach missions were built near the pueblos. Croix also did not build any forts at the new pueblos. The 1781 uprising at Yuma Crossing on the Colorado River damaged the Spanish Arizona mission settlements of San Pedro y San Pablo de Bicuñer and Puerto de Purísima Concepción. The attacks of July 18, 1781 killed Lieutenant Governor Fernando Rivera y Moncada, the mission Father of the Arizona mission, Francisco Garcés, and others. Yuma Revolt at the crossing and the pueblos resulted in the death of about 100 Spanish: about 60 men, 20 women, and 20 children. Of the men killed there were four friars, 36 soldiers and 20 civilians. The Yumas also took 74 as captives. Though Pedro Fages leadership a group took two visits to the Yumas and was able to get 72 of the captives released in 1781.

Captain José Antonio Roméu was put in charge of a retaliatory force to attack the Yumas for the massacre. He and Governor Felipe de Neve led attacked the elusive warriors from September to October in 1782. The retaliatory force killed 108 Yumas, took 85 prisoners, and recover 1,048 stolen horses. But the operation was unable to defeat the Yumas and Anza Trail stayed closed.

In December 1851 US Major Samuel P. Heintzelman and sixty US troops came to the Yuma Crossing from San Diego. They built Fort Yuma. In 1852 he was able to end hostilities with the Yumas and end the Yuma War.

== José Antonio Romualdo Pacheco Sr. ==
José Antonio Romualdo Pacheco Sr., also called Lieutenant Alfrez José Antonio Romualdo Pacheco and Captain José Antonio Romualdo Pacheco, was born in 1795 in Guanajuato, Mexico. His father was Mariano Pacheco and mother Maria Gertrudis Pacheco. He was an engineer and New Spain soldier. He was an overseas of the repair and construction of a few of the Alto California forts. He built Fort Fuerte de Laguna Chapala in 1825. The fort was to be built at the current Banning, California, but water at the New River made this his better choice. He called the small lake by the river, Laguna Chapala. He hired local Indians to help build the fort (before they were mistreated). He married Maria Ramona de la Luz Pacheco (Wilson). Pacheco had two children: Juan Mariano Martin Pacheco y Carrillo and José Antonio Romualdo Pacheco Jr. José Antonio Romualdo Pacheco Jr. became the 12th Governor of California in 1875. Pacheco was killed on December 6, 1831, at the Battle of Cahuenga Pass in Los Angeles, California in 1831. Pacheco shot Jose Maria Avila, who had attacked Alta California Governor Manuel Victoria with a lance, but Pacheco died when Avila's lance struck him. Maria later married John Wilson of San Francisco.

== See also ==
- California Historical Landmarks in Imperial County
- Yuma War - US battles
- Imperial County
- Imperial Valley
- Calexico–Mexicali
