= Rancho Tecate =

Rancho Tecate, or Rancho Cañada de Tecate was a land grant made to Juan Bandini in 1829, by the Mexican governor of Alta California, José María de Echeandía. He granted 4,439 acres (18 km2) of land in the valley of Tecate. A grant to Juan Bandini is recorded as being completed for Rancho Cañada de Tecate on July 12, 1834, under governor José Figueroa.

The Rancho Tecate was the most remote in a series of ranchos located eastward from San Diego along the trail established between Sonora and Alta California. This trail, established in 1828, crossed the Colorado River south of modern Algodones and passed through Ranchos Tijuana, San Isidro Ajajolojol and finally Tecate.

In 1836, Kumeyaay, with some aid from some former mission neophytes, raided and plundered the rancho. They besieged the ranch house and due to the house being built on an elevation, the men within managed to hold out until it was relieved by a force from San Diego. With his stock and horses stolen and the house burned, Bandini, like owners of other ranchos near San Diego, had to abandon the isolated rancho in the 1840s. Due to the continuing hostilities with the Kumeyaay, Bandini never returned, being compensated with Rancho Jurupa, in 1838.
