= Pecho Creek =

Stream in San Luis Obispo County, California, U.S.

Pecho Creek, originally known as Arroyo Del Pecho or Cañada del Pecho, is a stream in San Luis Obispo County, California.

Pecho Creek has its source is in the Irish Hills, at 35°13′16″N 120°46′19″W, 1.2 miles (1.9 km) east-southeast of Saddle Peak, at an elevation of 1,360 feet (410 meters). The stream flows south-southwest to its mouth at the Pacific Ocean, 1.7 miles (2.7 km) west-northwest of San Luis Hill. Its mouth is at sea level in the Pacific Ocean.

== History ==
Pecho Creek was part of the eastern boundary of the Rancho Pecho y Islay, and of subsequent Rancho Cañada de los Osos y Pecho y Islay when it was consolidated with the Rancho Cañada de los Osos in 1845. It was part of the western border of the Rancho San Miguelito.
