= Spooners Cove =

Spooners Cove, formerly Spooner's Cove, and Buchon Cove, is a bay in San Luis Obispo County, California. It is located at 35°16′30″N 120°53′27″W, 1.4 miles north northeast of Point Buchon. Islay Creek has its mouth at this cove.

== History ==
Spooners Cove is named for Alden B. Spooner II who first settled above the cove (then named Buchon Cove) with his family in 1892.
