= Joseph John Chapman =

Early California settler (1784–1849)

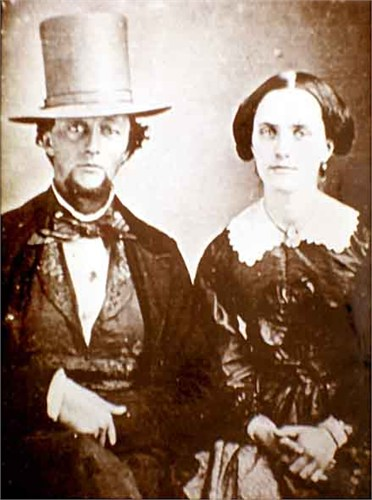
- Joseph John Chapman and Guadalupe Ortega y Sánchez c.1847
- Born: Joseph John Chapman; 1784
- Died: 1849 (aged 64–65)
- Occupation: Merchant sailor

Joseph John "Jose Juan" Chapman (1784–1849) was an American merchant sailor, then a crew member under the privateer Hippolyte Bouchard (Letter of Marque 116 signed by Juan Martín de Pueyrredon), then one of the earliest English-speaking settlers and builders of Mexican Alta California. Chapman was one of the first known American-born permanent residents of Alta California. The scanty and inconsistent historical record makes it difficult to be sure of many details of Chapman's life, but he was a valued member of several early southern California settlements, and interacted with a number of historical characters.

== Early life and sailing career ==
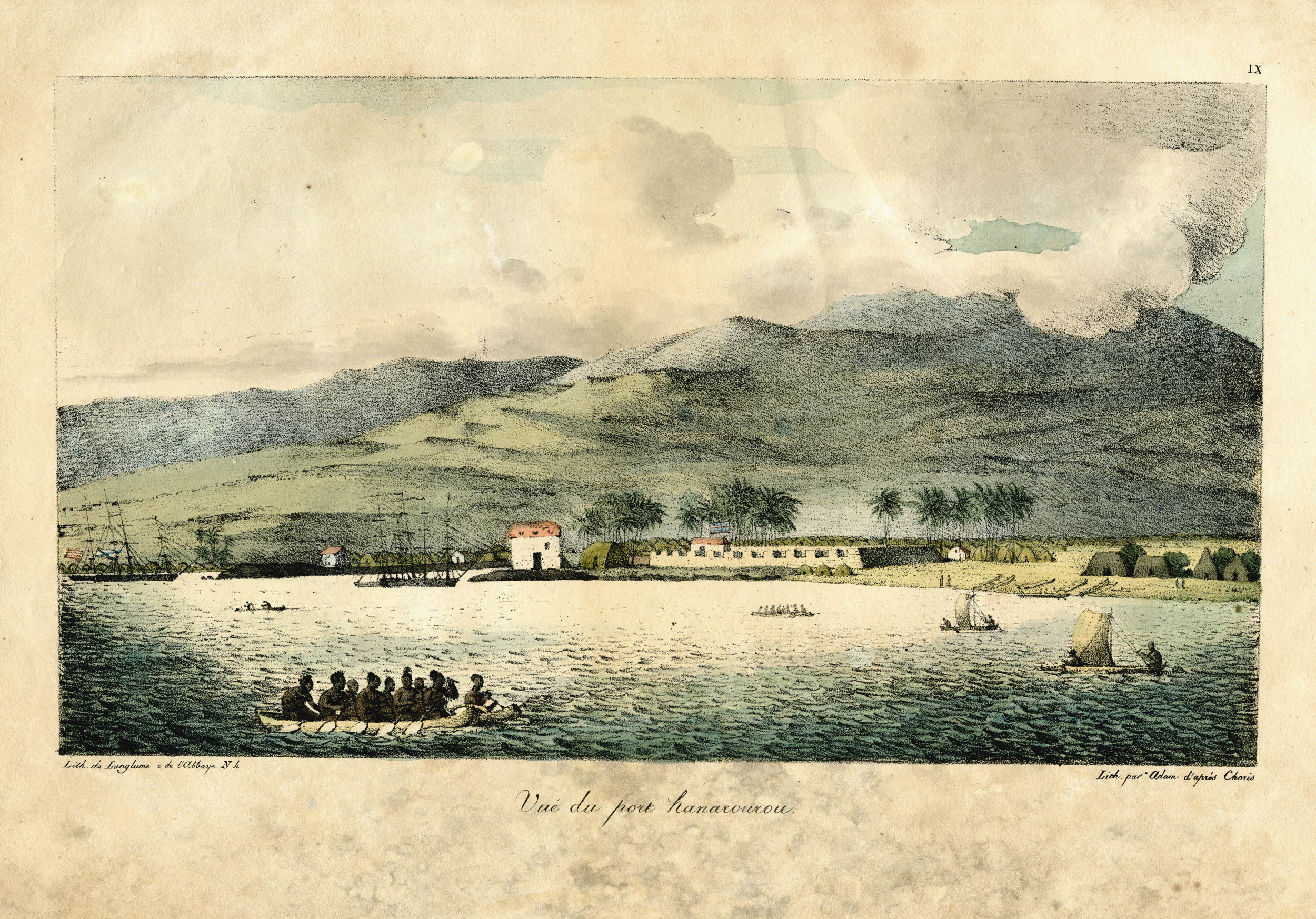
1816 painting of Hawaii, with sailing ships at anchor

Most sources say Joseph John Chapman was born in Boston, Massachusetts (a few say Maine) in 1784 the son of Daniel Chapman (born Ipswich, England) and Rosenda Cananta ("Rosenda Conant," born Boston, Massachusetts). Trained as a carpenter, blacksmith and shipbuilder, Chapman went to sea as a young man. When Argentina proclaimed its independence from Spain in 1811 (the same year México began its own war for independence), Chapman headed for South America. Presumably, he left Boston on board an American merchant ship, but ended up on board a vessel under the command of the Argentine privateer Hippolyte Bouchard.

Sources disagree on how exactly Chapman came to be in Bouchard's crew and how he left it. One story, (favored by Chapman himself) is that he was forcibly impressed into Bouchard's crew while on a stop in the Sandwich Islands (Hawaii). Another story is that he was in the crew of a Bouchard corvette named Santa Rosa which mutinied, sailed to Hawaii, and tried to sell the ship to Kamehameha I, ruler of Hawaii. Bouchard, returning from the Philippines, reacquired the ship and Chapman before that deal could be completed. Recently found documents (2016) show that Chapman voluntarily joined the crew, after having been in charge of the Santa Rosa by order of Kamehameha.

Chapman was a Bouchard crewman during the 1818 attack on Monterey, California. At that point, the tales diverge again. Alta California governor Pablo Vicente de Solá reported that Chapman was one of three prisoners taken from one of Bouchard's two ships, the Santa Rosa, that surrendered after an artillery duel. A first-person account from the Bouchard crew says he was captured by Spanish soldiers during a sortie to the shore. Another variation says he was captured later, during an attack on Rancho Nuestra Señora del Refugio, on the coast north of Santa Barbara. Still another story combines the two, with Chapman first being captured at Monterey, then freed by Bouchard's raiding party, then captured a second time at Rancho Nuestra Señora del Refugio. In a variation of this last, Chapman deserted Bouchard at Refugio and made his way inland to Mission Santa Inez, where he surrendered. A later story, possibly told by a son concerned with family image, ignored the pirate episode altogether and claimed that Chapman entered California after being shipwrecked near San Pedro.

== Early years in California ==
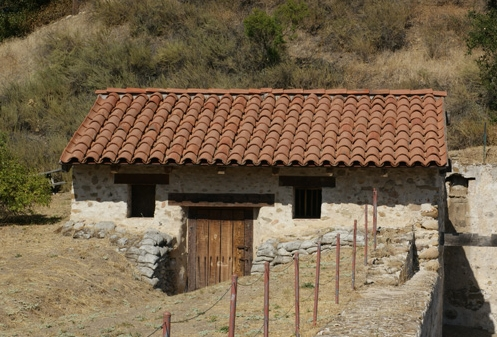
Fulling mill (c.1821) at Mission Santa Ines, CA

The first historical record of Chapman's presence in California is from 1821, when he designed and helped build a fulling mill near Mission Santa Inés. During that time, he received notice from Governor Solá that he was included in a general amnesty granted by King Ferdinand VII of Spain to Anglo-American prisoners. He was held nominally as a prisoner until the arrival of news in 1821 proclaiming Mexico's independence from Spain.

The following year (June 24, 1822), he was baptized (converted to Roman Catholicism) at Mission San Buenaventura, and married a Californio girl named Maria de Guadalupe Ortega (a daughter of José Francisco Ortega) at Mission Santa Inés. His name from that point on was José Juan Chapman y Cananta, although he was also known by the nicknames "Blonde Joe" or famously, "El Diablo".

That same year, he is credited by some sources with helping to complete the roof of the Old Plaza Church in Los Angeles, by leading a logging crew into the San Gabriel Mountains to fell and bring back large pine trees for use as ceiling beams.

By 1824, Chapman had prospered well enough to buy a house in the Los Angeles pueblo, along with some nearby farm land where he planted a vineyard. He continued to work on various projects for the pueblo and for Mission San Gabriel, and found favor with padre José Bernardo Sánchez, head of the mission from 1821 to 1827.

In 1827, Chapman was one of the few available local English-speakers summoned to Mission San Gabriel to greet fellow American Jedediah Smith. Smith's party had just completed the first recorded journey to southern California by land from the United States. Smith's clerk Harrison Rogers recorded many encounters with Chapman during the party's stay at the mission, including his supervision of a neophyte (local Tongva converts) charcoal-making crew, and a conversation in which Chapman told of the natural asphalt pool near the pueblo, known to the Spanish as La Brea.

Sometime between 1827 and 1831, Chapman designed and built a 60-ton schooner at San Pedro, which he christened Guadalupe in honor of his wife. In 1831, another Chapman skill was put to use. Unpopular California governor Manuel Victoria was severely wounded fighting rebellious locals at the Battle of Cahuenga Pass. Chapman was called on to dress his wounds, which he apparently did well enough that Victoria survived. That same year, Chapman was naturalized as a Mexican citizen.

== Move to Santa Barbara ==
Not long after 1831, Chapman and his family moved to Santa Barbara, where he acquired the property near the beach which later became known as Burton Mound. Sources disagree as to whether he bought the land from Mission Santa Barbara or received it as a grant from governor Alvarado. In 1840, he sold that property to American former fur trapper George Nidever. He then acquired other property: one source says in Santa Barbara County; another says on the Santa Clara River, on or near Rancho Santa Clara del Norte in present-day Ventura County.

== Death and legacy ==
Jose Juan Chapman died and was interred in the Mission Santa Barbara cemetery on January 10, 1849. He and Guadalupe were the parents of eleven children, many of whose descendants still live in southern California.
