= Rancho Llano de Santa Rosa =

Mexican land grant in California

Coordinates: 38.45°N 122.75°W

Rancho Llano de Santa Rosa was a 13,316-acre (53.89 km^{2}) Mexican land grant in present-day Sonoma County, California given in 1844 by Governor Manuel Micheltorena to Joaquín Carrillo. The name means "Plains of Santa Rosa". The grant was west of Santa Rosa along the Laguna de Santa Rosa and encompassed present-day Sebastopol, California.

== History ==
Joaquín Victor Carrillo II (1820–1899) was the eldest son of Joaquin Victor Carrillo I (1793–1835) and María Ygnacia de la Candelaria López (1793–1849). He was granted three leagues just west of his mother's Rancho Cabeza de Santa Rosa. Joaquín Carrillo's brother-in-law General Vallejo, was a critical factor in obtaining the grant.

Joaquín Carrillo located and applied for the grant as early as 1844. In 1846 he built an adobe house on the western end of the rancho, within Analy township, near present-day Sebastopol. Joaquín Carrillo was alcalde of Sonoma in 1846, and was taken prisoner during the Bear Flag Revolt. Joaquín Carrillo was the owner of two Sebastopol hotels (the Analy and the Pioneer), a saloon and a boarding house. He was first married to Guadalupe Carrillo (1831–1874), but they were divorced in 1870. Joaquin married Mary Springer of Bodega Bay in 1875. About six weeks later, his son was arrested for shooting his father, Joaquin Carrillo. The shooting was said to be the result of a long-standing family quarrel. Joaquin Carrillo survived the shooting by his son and continued to be a resident of Sebastopol until he died in 1899.

With the cession of California to the United States following the Mexican-American War, the 1848 Treaty of Guadalupe Hidalgo provided that the land grants would be honored. As required by the Land Act of 1851, a claim for Rancho Llano de Santa Rosa was filed with the Public Land Commission in 1852, and the grant was patented to Joaquín Carrillo in 1871.

A claim for one square league was filed with the Land Commission in 1852 by John Hendley and Joseph N. Nevill, but was rejected. Dr. John Hendley (1820–1875) was born in Lexington, Kentucky, had been assistant surgeon in a Missouri volunteer regiment, and came to California in 1850, settling in the following year on his farm, where he died. He was Sonoma County's first treasurer and clerk.

A claim for one square league was filed with the Land Commission in 1852 by Joseph M. Miller, but was rejected. Dr. Joseph Morgan Miller (1814–1875) was born in Virginia and came to California in 1850, where he went into business with John Walker in 1851. Miller and Walker opened a trading post at what is now Sebastopol, that became the first Post office and in 1852 James M. Miller became Postmaster. Miller and Walker bought 4,000 acres (16.2 km^{2}) of land from Joaquin Carrillo.
