= Agustín V. Zamorano =

American politician (1798–1842)

Agustín Vicente Zamorano
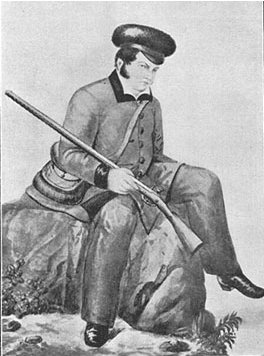

Comandante General of Alta California (north)
- In office 1832–1833

Personal details
- Born: 1798 Spanish Florida
- Died: 1842 (aged 43–44) San Diego, Alta California
- Spouse: María Luisa Argüello
- Profession: Civil servant, politician, printer, soldier

Military service
- Rank: Captain
- Commands: Presidio of San Diego

Agustín Vicente Zamorano (1798–1842), was a printer, soldier, and provisional Comandante General in the north of Alta California.

== History ==
Agustín Zamorano was born in Spanish Florida to Spanish parents within the Spanish colonial Viceroyalty of New Spain. He entered the newly independent Mexican army May 1, 1821, as a cadet, where he served in Mexico.

=== Alta California ===
He moved north in 1825 to the Mexican territory of Alta California, appointed as Secretary of State to Governor José María Echeandía. He served until 1831. During this period, he would create and print official letterhead, using woodblocks and type, without a printing press.

In February 1827 Zamorano married María Luisa Argüello, daughter of Santiago Argüello and his wife, in a noted double wedding in San Diego. Their children were Dolores, Luis, Gonzalo, Guadalupe, Josefa, Agustín, and Eulalia.

Zamorano became allied with a faction in northern California, participating in the 1831 Mexican Revolution, heading a group of rebels in Monterey, as Captain of the Monterey Company. The troops included a number of foreign residents, chiefly from the United States.

==== Governor ====
Governor Manuel Victoria decision to stop the Mexican government's secularization of the Alta California missions and redistribution of the land holdings as land grant ranchos because he believed the government should stand by the original commitment to hold that land in trust for Mission Indians. Victoria faced strong opposition from residents, particularly foreigners from the United States and Europe who wanted to acquire large landholdings. He was forced into exile from California in January 1832. Encheandía remained acting governor until an assembly met in Pueblo de Los Angeles. It chose Pío Pico as governor according to the Plan of San Diego, but officials in Los Angeles refused to recognize him.

At that time, Zamorano proceeded to lead a rebellion in northern Alta California, and acted as governor there. Encheadía acted as governor in southern Alta California. During January 31, 1832 – January 15, 1833, Zamorano served as provisional Governor of Alta California at Monterey in the north, with José María de Echeandía serving at Pueblo de Los Angeles in the south.

The federal Mexican government appointed José Figueroa as governor in late 1832; he arrived in January 1833, and Zamorano returned to his former duties as commandant.

==== Printer ====
Zamorano is most noted for being the first person to bring a printing press to California, a wood-frame Ramage press purchased in Boston, Massachusetts. He set up a print shop in Monterey in the summer of 1834. As secretary to the Mexican Governor, he printed early proclamations of Mexican governors. The first items he issued were a sixteen-page Reglamento (1834) and about a half-dozen broadsides and sheets.

Zamorano published the first books in California. The first book he printed was Manifiesto a la Republica Mejicana in 1835. The Manifesto granted amnesty to the people of Alta California after the recent rebellion.

He offered to provide "equitable prices with gentlemen who may wish to establish any periodical," but nobody took up his offer. In total, he printed eleven broadsides, six books, six miscellaneous works, and numerous letterheads.

The first newspaper was not printed until 1840. That year U.S. Commodore Robert F. Stockton found Zamorano's old press and Walter Colton, chaplain of the U.S. frigate Congress and former editor of the Philadelphia North American, started the Monterey Californian.

==== Later years ====
Capt. Zamorano was the last appointed Commandant of the Presidio of San Diego during 1835–1840, but never assumed command. He was in San Diego in that period only during 1837–1838.

Agustín Zamorano left Alta California in 1838 for Mexico. He later returned to San Diego in 1842, where he died that year.

== Legacy ==
The Zamorano Club was formed in 1928 by a group of California book collectors, printers and librarians in honor of Agustín Zamorano.

In 1986, Zamorano Fine Arts Academy, an elementary school in southeastern San Diego, was named in his honor.

In 2012, Celeste Montalvo, a descendant of Agustin Vicente Zamorano, created a Facebook page and a group so that 'Descendants of Agustin Vicente Zamorano' could post family pictures and share their history.

One of his descendants is the well-known singer Linda Ronstadt.

== See also ==
- List of pre-statehood governors of California
- List of Ranchos of California
