= Rancho San Isidro Ajajolojol =

Mexican land grant

Coordinates: 32°32′24″N 116°47′21″W

Rancho San Isidro Ajajolojol, also known as Rancho San Isidro Ajolojol, Rancho Joljol or Toljol or Rancho Jesus Maria or San Ysidro Ajajolojol, was a land grant made to José López in 1836 by interim Governor Nicolas Gutierrez.

== Location ==
It covered 26,019.53 acres in what is now San Isidro in the Tijuana Municipality of Baja California, Mexico 14 miles east of Tijuana, and 9 miles west of Tecate along the northern tributaries of the Tijuana River near the United States boundary in Baja California Territory.

The property of Rancho San Isidro Ajajolojol, lies at an elevation of 987 feet (301 meters), bounded on the west by the mountains dividing it from Rancho Tijuana.

== History ==
In 1822, José López and his brother requested a concession for the Rancho San Ysidro Ajolojol, east of what later became Rancho Tía Juana. This ranch was reported in 1828 to be a stock range. José Lopez was the son of Ignacio Lopez a soldier at the San Diego Presidio. With his father and his brother Juan Bautista Lopez, Jose Lopez participated in Pio Pico's revolt against Governor Manuel Victoria, opponent of secularizing the missions, in 1831.

Like many ranchos east of San Diego it was attacked by the Kumeyaay in 1837 and abandoned for a time requiring a new grant to be made later. It was formally granted to Juan Ignacio Lopez on June 11, 1840, as Rancho Toljol. The Expediente for Rancho Joljol successfully submitted, formal title to the grant was recorded on July 12, 1840, however it was strangely recorded as Toljol.

Gold was found at the ranch in 1851 and subsequently mined there. Its grant title was confirmed by the Mexican Government in 1861 and it is still in existence.
