= José María de Echeandía =

Mexican governor of Alta California (?–1871)

4th Governor of Alta California
- In office 1825–1831
- Preceded by: Luis Antonio Argüello
- Succeeded by: Manuel Victoria

Interim Governor of Alta California
- In office 1832–1833
- Preceded by: Pío Pico
- Succeeded by: José Figueroa

Personal details
- Died: 1871

José María de Echeandía (?–1871) was the Mexican governor of Alta California from 1825 to 1831 and again from 1832 to 1833. He was the only governor of The Californias who lived in San Diego.

== Personal life ==
He was a Lieutenant-Colonel connected with a college of engineers in Mexico. He moved north to Monterey at appointment, leaving his wife and four daughters in Mexico with an olive oil mill he owned. He asked Mexico to give half of his government pay to his Wife. In 1855, he returned to Mexico to find his wife was paid no money and his mill not doing well, with his fortunes turned and he found himself poor. In 1835, there was an earthquake. Being an engineer he was in demand to repair the many damaged buildings and was able to get out of poverty. Antonio López de Santa Anna arrested him in 1855 for a political reasons on something Echeandía negatively said about him, but he was then released. He returned to California and lived there with his daughters, even after the U.S. takeover in 1847 he continued in California until his death in 1871. He had step-daughters to care for him in his old age.

== Governor ==
In 1825, Echeandía was appointed Governor of both lower Baja and upper Alta California. He moved to Monterey, California, as this was the current capital. Not liking the cold fog and that he felt too far away from Baja, he moved to San Diego. Most of the administrative office stayed in Monterey. Much of the north Californio were not happy with this absent leader. He appointed Military officer José María Padré as a Lt. Governor of Baja California. Padré was elected to Mexico's congress in 1828. Padré appointed a lower level office in his place, but his did not go over well. In 1829 Manuel Victoria was sent to be the governor of Baja California. Victoria was more on the side of the missions over the new rancho and Californio.

In 1826 Governor Echeandía had Jedediah Smith and his men "arrested", interviewed, released and ordered to depart California, as he was fearful that Smith's reports would open the area to moreAmericans.

Echeandía reduced the area and time span of Russians sea otter hunting off the coast of California, that his predecessor Luis Antonio Argüello had licensed to the Russians.

In 1827, Echeandía did not deport Father José Barona a priest of Mission San Juan Capistrano. Barona supported Independence of Mexico; but would not swear an oath of allegiance to the republic of Mexico. The Mexican government passed legislation on December 20, 1827, that mandated the expulsion of all Spaniards younger than sixty years of age from Mexican territories; Governor Echeandía nevertheless intervened on Barona's behalf in order to prevent his deportation once the law of took effect in California.

In 1828, Echeandía issued the first truancy law of California. It ordered the commanding officers to compel parents to send their children to the schools which he had established. In 1829, throughout Alta California, there were 339 students in 11 primary schools. During this time a noted educator in San Diego was Friar Antonio Menendez and his 18 pupils. Private schools operated throughout this time in California also.

After Victoria's removal, Echeandía started serving as provisional governor of the south part of California from 1832 to 1833. Agustin V. Zamorano from 1832 to 1833 was the provisional governor of north part of California. This was due to the removal of Victoria. The removal was in part due to a military uprising revolt and the Battle of Cahuenga Pass and Victoria was not liked by the rich.

In 1829, soldiers who had not been paid for years marched south starting in Monterey. Echeandía heard about the unrest and had his troops stop them just before Santa Barbara.

In 1829, Estanislao, an indigenous alcalde, of Mission San José and a member and leader of the Lakisamni tribe of the Yokuts people of northern California lead a bands of armed Native Americans in revolt against the California Mexican government. Estanislao led many raids against Mexican settlers. Echeandía send troops led by Mariano Guadalupe Vallejo to battle him in the San Joaquin Valley but did not win. In 1833, malaria was accidentally introduced into the San Joaquin Valley by Canadian beaver trappers from the Hudson's Bay Company. More than 20,000 California natives died from malaria in 1833-34 including many Yokuts, Chumash, Miwok and others, thus ending the revolts.

Governor José Figueroa arrived from Mexico in 1833, resolving the north–south political struggle and replaced Echeandía on January 14, 1833. Figueroa continued the secularization of missions and giving out of Mexican land grants.

== Proclamation of Emancipation ==
Echeandía as the first native Mexican elected Governor of Alta California issued a "Proclamation of Emancipation" (or "Prevenciónes de Emancipacion") on July 25, 1826. All Indians within the military districts of San Diego Mission, Santa Barbara, and Monterey who were found qualified were freed from missionary rule and made eligible to become Mexican citizens. Those who wished to remain under mission tutelage (guardianship) were exempted from most forms of corporal punishment. By 1830 even those new to California appeared confident in their own abilities to operate the mission ranches and farms independently; the padres, however, doubted the capabilities of their charges in this regard. In 1831, the number of Indians under missionary control in all of Upper-Alta California was about 18,683 and about 4,342 of garrison soldiers, free settlers, and "other classes" totaled 4,342.

New immigration of both Mexican and foreigners, increased pressure on the Alta California government to seize the mission properties and dispossess the natives in accordance with Echeandía's directive. Despite the fact that Echeandía's emancipation plan was met with little encouragement from the newcomers who populated the southern missions, he was nonetheless determined to test the scheme on a large scale at Mission San Juan Capistrano. To that end, he appointed a number of comisionados (commissioners) to oversee the emancipation of the Indians. The Mexican government passed legislation on December 20, 1827 that mandated the expulsion of all Spaniards younger than sixty years of age from Mexican territories; Governor Echeandía nevertheless intervened on behalf of some of the Spanish-born Franciscans missionaries in order to prevent their deportation once the law took effect in California. he knew this would leave most missions without missionaries priests.

In 1830 as Governor he had Father Martinez arrested on charge of treason, and banished the Father from the Mexican territories.

== Mission secularization ==
Echeandía supported the Mexican secularization act of 1833 put on the Alta California missions. The act started the redistribution of the land holdings of the church to land grant ranchos. Echeandía did not take any ranchos for himself.

While the secularization act was passed after Echeandía departed office. In 1827, one of his sub lieutenant José Antonio Sánchez, who was stationed at the Presidio of San Francisco, was granted permission by Echeandía to occupy the a rancho, Rancho Buri Buri, for "grazing and agricultural purposes" on the Mission San Francisco de Asís's Mission Dolores lands. The land later was granted to him in 1835, by Governor José Castro.

In 1827 Rancho Jamul to Pío Pico, land of 4,439-acre (17.96 km^{2})

In 1827 he made a land grant of Rancho El Rosario on Baja California, to Don José Manuel Machado, one of the first soldiers stationed at the Presidio of San Diego.

In 1828 he granted Rancho La Brea land of 4,439-acre (17.96 km^{2}) in present-day Los Angeles County, California. The land was given to Antonio Jose Rocha and Nemisio Dominguez by José Antonio Carrillo, the Alcalde of Los Angeles. Rancho La Brea consisted of one square league of land of what is now Wilshire's Miracle Mile, Hollywood, and parts of West Hollywood. The grant included the famous La Brea Tar Pits.

In 1829 Echeandía made a land grant of Rancho Tía Juana to Santiago Arguello, paymaster at the Presidio of San Diego and part of the revolt against Governor Manuel Victoria. It covered 26,019.53 acres in what is now Tijuana and parts of San Ysidro in San Diego.

In 1829 Echeandía gave a land grant to Rancho Janal of 4,437-acre (17.96 km^{2}) in present-day San Diego County. The grant was to José Antonio Estudillo a lieutenant at the Presidio of San Diego. The grant was located near present-day Otay Mesa.

Even though Echeandía had already been replaced as governor, he still appointed Alvarado to oversee the secularization of Mission San Miguel. The new governor, Manuel Victoria rescinded the order and wanted Alvarado and Castro arrested. The pair fled and were hidden by their old friend Mariano Guadalupe Vallejo, who was now adjutant at the Presidio of San Francisco. However, Victoria's rule proved to be unpopular and he was overthrown by Echeandía, then replaced by Pío Pico at the end of 1831.

In 1829 he grants land of Rancho Tecate to Juan Bandini. The grant was for 4,439 acres (18 km2) of land in the valley of Tecate in Baja California, near San Diego. A grant to Juan Bandini is recorded as being completed for Rancho Cañada de Tecate on July 12, 1834 under governor José Figueroa.

He granted Rancho Temescal in present-day Riverside County, California to Leandro Serrano.

The actor Ben Wright played Governor Echeandia in the 1960 episode "Forbidden Wedding" of the syndicated television anthology series Death Valley Days, hosted by Stanley Andrews. In the story line, Echeandia objects to the wedding of a young woman who once spurned his affections.

== See also ==
- List of pre-statehood governors of California
- List of Ranchos of California
- Rancho Suey
- Henry D. Fitch
- William Edward Petty Hartnell
- Agustín V. Zamorano - Secretary of State to Governor José María Echeandía.
