= William Holden (politician) =

American politician

Engraving of Holden published 1858

William Holden (c. 1824 – June 3, 1884) was the 11th lieutenant governor of California, 1867–1871.

== Biography ==
Holden was born in Antwerp, Jefferson County, New York. He studied law, attained admission to the bar in 1845, and practiced in Johnson County, Missouri.

He relocated to California in 1850, settled in Stanislaus County, and worked as a farmer and merchant in addition to practicing law. A Democrat, he became active in politics, and served in both the California State Assembly (1857-1858), (1865-1866), (1881-1882) and California State Senate (1858-1860), (1862-1864).

In 1866, Holden ran successfully for lieutenant governor, and served from 1867 to 1871.

Holden died in Healdsburg, California on June 3, 1884.

== Sources ==
=== Magazines ===
- "Members of the California Senate". Hutchings' Illustrated California Magazine. Vol. II, no. 10. San Francisco, CA: Hutchings & Rosenfield. April 1, 1858. p. 438.

=== Books ===
- Hendricks, W. C. (1889). Governmental Roster, State and County Governments of California. State Printing Office: Sacramento, CA. pp. 130, 160, 176.

Political offices
Preceded by Tim N. Machin	Lieutenant Governor of California; 1867–1871	Succeeded by Romualdo Pacheco
