= Montaña de Oro State Park =

State park in California, United States

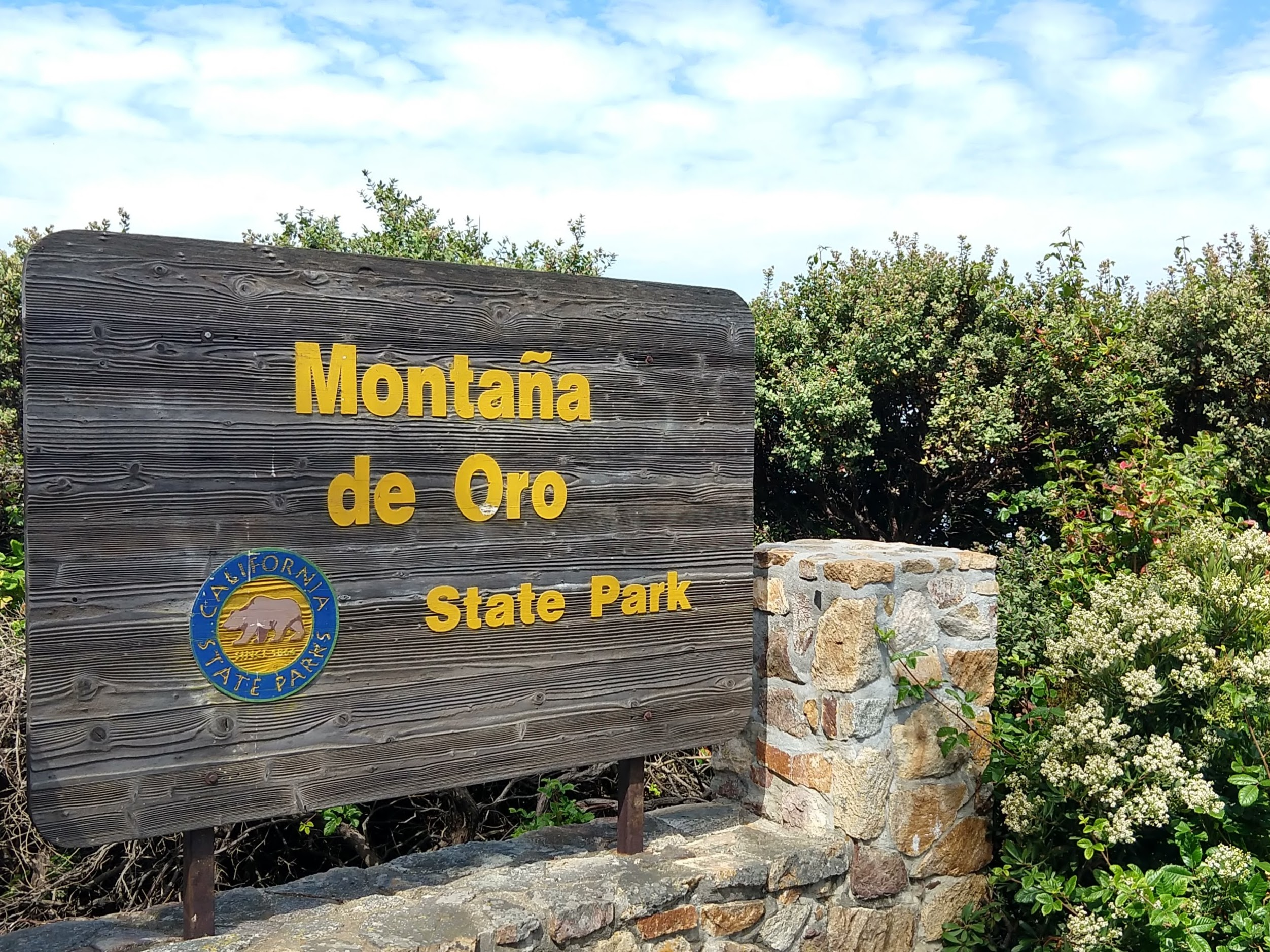

- Location within California Location within the United States
- Location: San Luis Obispo County, California
- Nearest city: Los Osos, Morro Bay, San Luis Obispo
- Coordinates: 35°15′50.04″N 120°51′43.92″W
- Area: 8,000 acres (32.4 km^{2})
- Governing body: California Department of Parks and Recreation

Montaña de Oro ("Mountain of Gold" in Spanish) is a state park in Central Coastal California, six miles southwest of Morro Bay and two miles south of Los Osos.

It consists of 8,000 acres (32 km^{2}) of cliffs, seven miles of shoreline, sandy beaches, dunes, coastal plains, streams, canyons, and hills, including the 1,347-foot (411 m) Valencia Peak. The park has many hiking, mountain biking, equestrian trails and horse campsites, as well as a primitive campground located across from Spooner's Cove, a popular beach. The Bluff Trail is an easy and popular trail along the scenic coast. Trails lead to the summits of Valencia Peak, Oats Peak, and Hazard Peak.

== Native Americans ==
Five hundred years ago, when Europeans first arrived on the California's central coast, they found it inhabited by the Chumash and Salinan people. An estimated 20,000 to 30,000 of them lived in small villages spread over a territory which extended from Morro Bay south to Malibu. Although the Chumash depended heavily upon the sea, they also drew on many other sources for food, clothing, and shelter, and were part of a large trading network. The Spanish Explorers who visited the Montana de Oro area in 1542 recorded that the Indians were attractive, friendly people who paddled out to greet them in canoes.

In 1769, Don Gaspar de Portola marched his troops north from San Diego to establish new territory for the king of Spain. With the beginning of the Mission period, many died from European diseases to which they had no immunity.

== History after 1842 ==
The property rights for Montaña de Oro State Park land area changed hands several times after California became a territory of the United States. Part of the park was the Rancho Cañada de los Osos that Victor Linares had been granted on December 1, 1842 by Governor Juan B. Alvarado. The rancho lay west of San Luis Obispo in the Los Osos Valley. Victor Linares sold his rancho to James Scott and John Wilson who also bought the adjacent Rancho Pecho y Islay in the Irish Hills to the south of their Los Osos rancho and combined them in a new 32,431 acre grant, Rancho Cañada de los Osos y Pecho y Islay from Governor Pio Pico in 1845.

It was used mostly for grazing sheep until 1892, when Alden B. Spooner, Jr., leased the land he later purchased around Islay Creek. He brought in dairy cattle, hogs and other agriculture. His two sons founded the Pecho Ranch & Stock Co., and built a ranch house, a complex of barns, a creamery, stables, sheds, and a waterwheel for power. On the south bluff of Spooner's Cove they utilized a warehouse with a long chute that led down to a wharf and a loading boom to service coastal steamers. The land just to the north was owned by Alexander S. Hazard, who also raised crops and maintained a dairy. Hoping to cash in on California's growing need for timber, he planted hundreds of eucalyptus trees, turning Hazard Canyon into a prospective lumber farm. Unfortunately, eucalyptus proved unsatisfactory for commercial use. In the early 1940s, a flood scoured Hazard Canyon, and in 1947 a grass fire burned up the coast from Diablo Canyon, destroying much of what had been the Hazard dairy buildings. However, Hazard's legacy, the stands of eucalyptus trees, remains. Rancher Oliver C. Field bought the land in the early 1940s, but sold it to Irene McAllister about ten years later. In 1965 the property was purchased by the State of California for a state park, and it was decided to keep the name McAllister had given it: "Montaña de Oro".

On April 24, 1965, Rancho Montaña de Oro was dedicated as a California State Park after it was purchased out of the Rancho Montaña de Oro, Inc. bankruptcy proceeding under the Park acquisition program that Governor Edmund G. "Pat" Brown had launched and managed to fund.

== Gallery ==
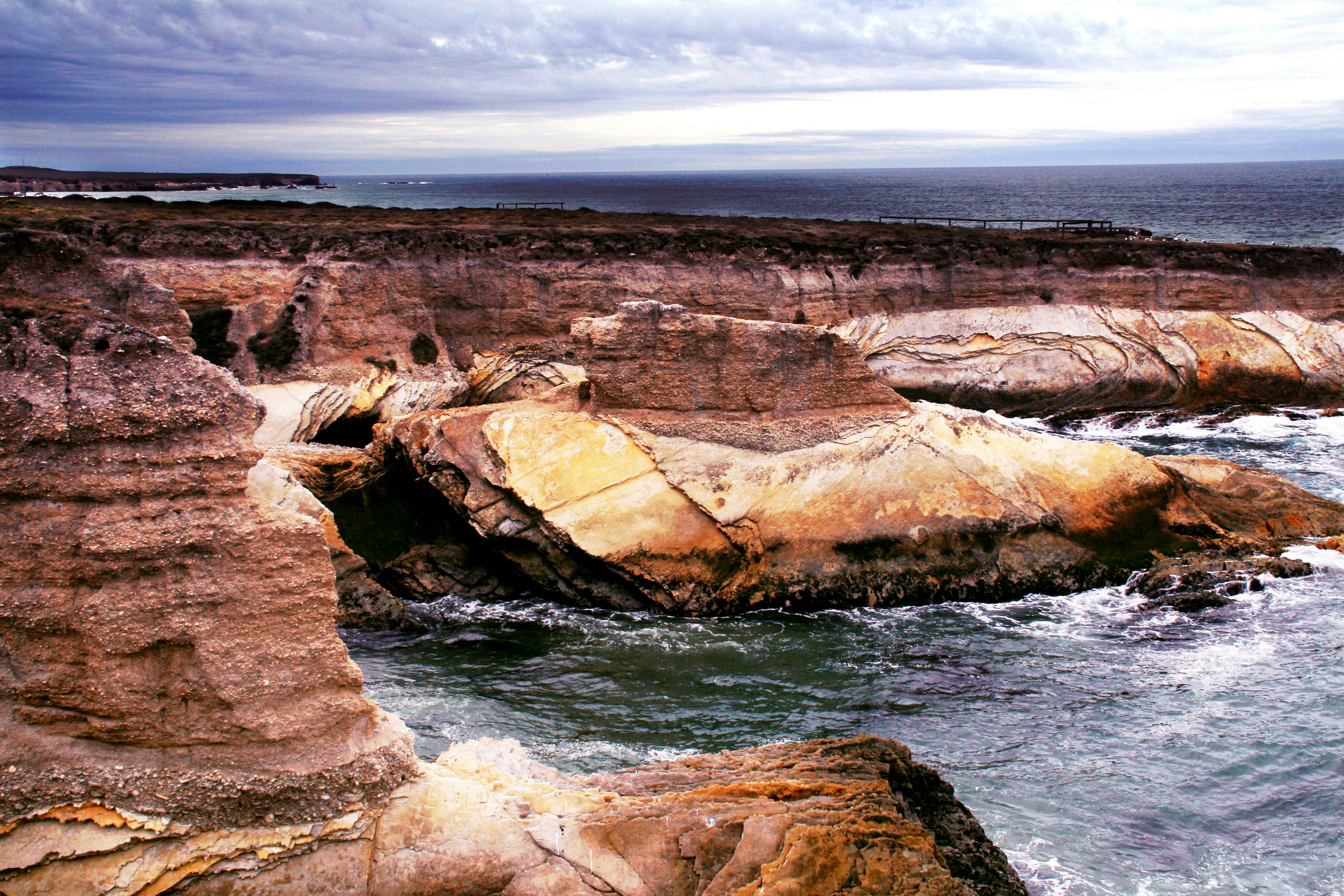
Submarine Rock, Montaña de Oro coast

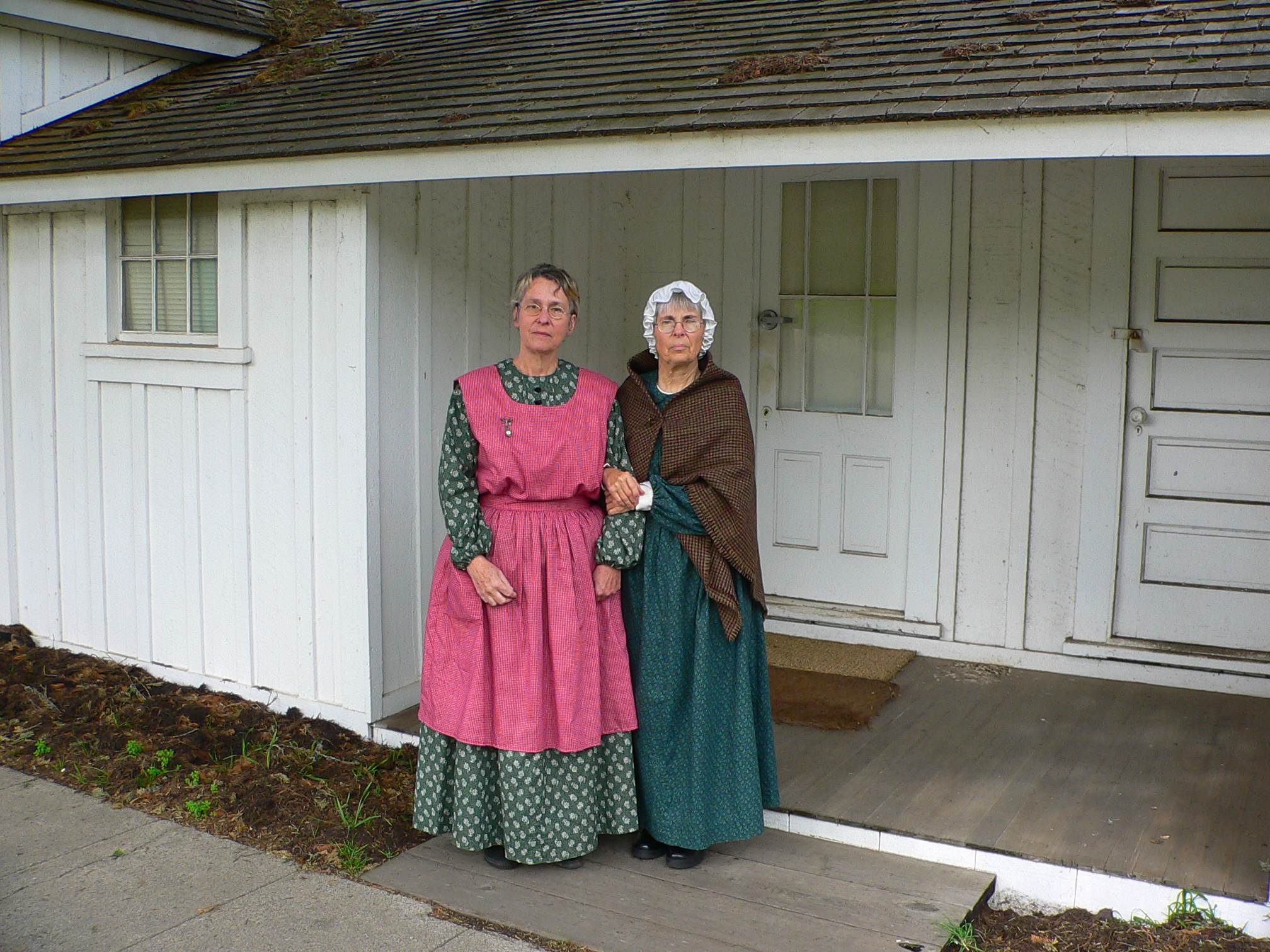
Spooner Ranch House living history program, 2005

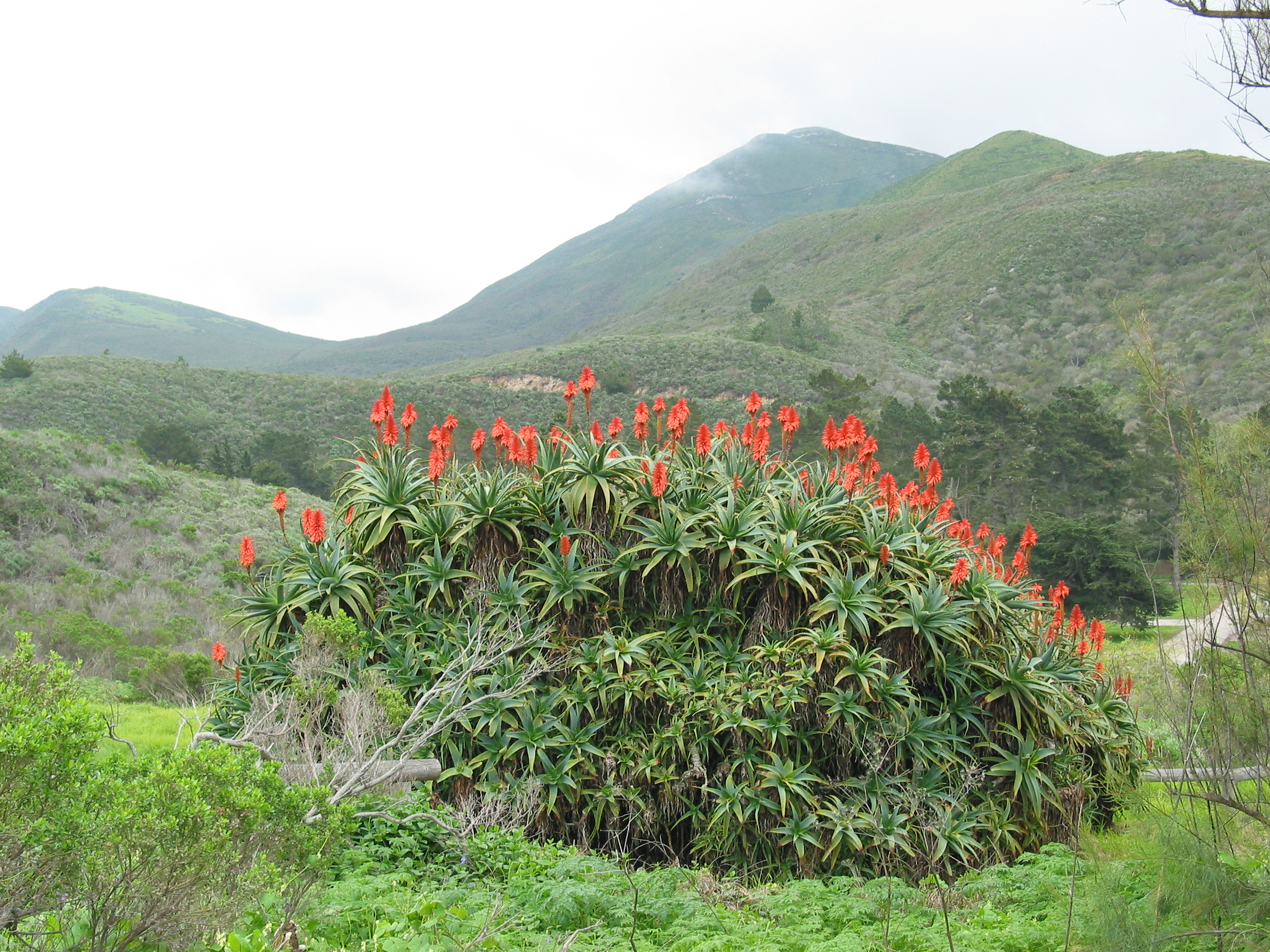
Aloe arborescens

Roiling surf

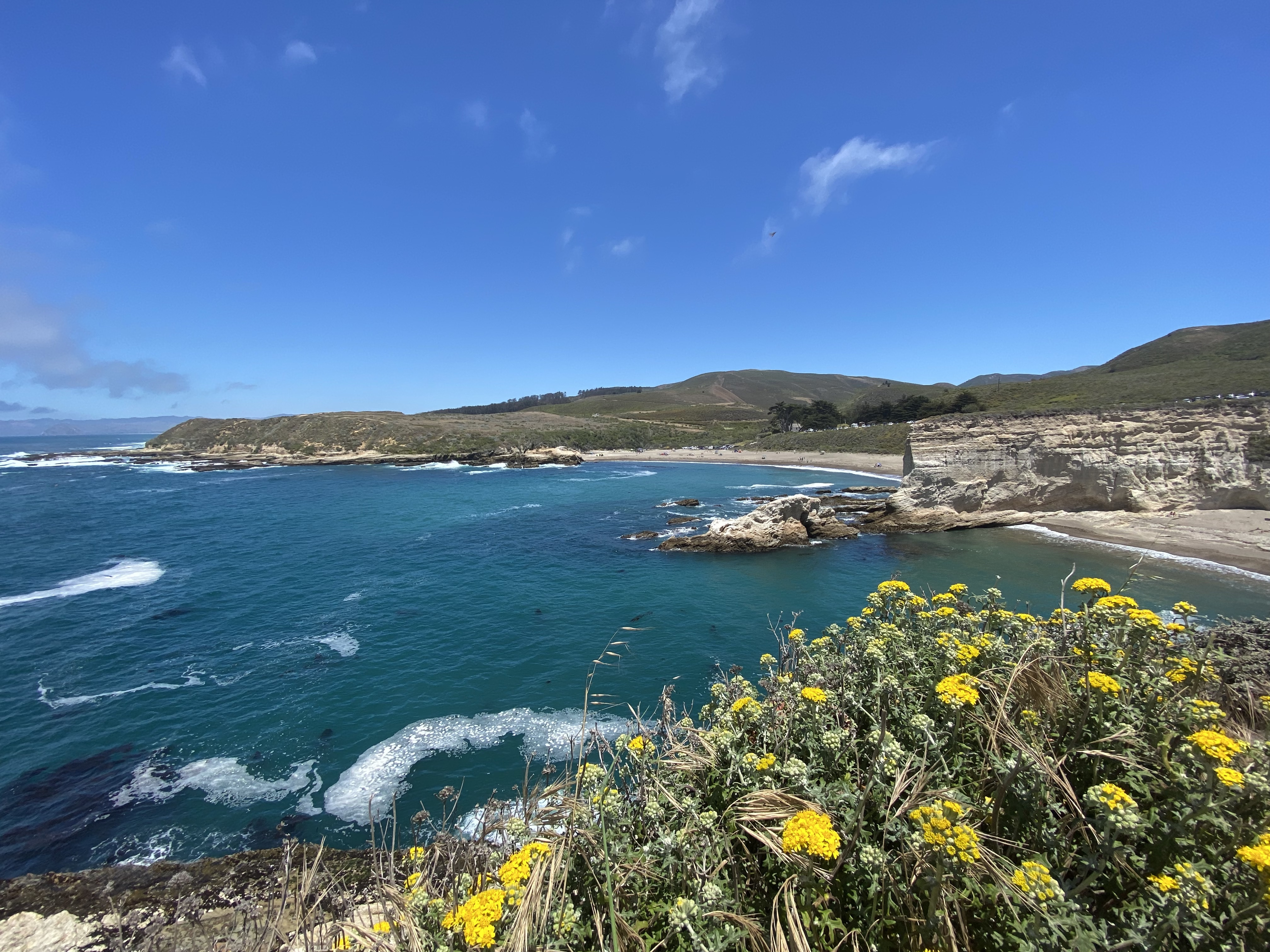
Northward view of Spooner's Cove via Bluff Trail, with Morro Bay in the distance. June 12, 2021

== Marine protected areas ==
Morro Bay State Marine Recreational Management Area and Morro Bay State Marine Reserve and Point Buchon State Marine Reserve and Marine Conservation Area are marine protected areas offshore from the Morro Bay area. These marine protected areas help conserve ocean wildlife and marine ecosystems.

== See also ==
- List of beaches in California
- List of California state parks
