= Islay Creek =

Stream in San Luis Obispo County, California, U.S.

Islay Creek is a stream in San Luis Obispo County, California. Its mouth is at Spooners Cove on the Pacific Ocean, at. Its source is at 35°15′29″N 120°46′46″W at an elevation of 1,380 feet (420 m) in the Irish Hills.
