= Manuel Victoria =

California governor, Mexican politician (died 1833)

5th Governor of Alta California
- In office 1831–1831
- Appointed by: Lucas Alamán
- Preceded by: José María de Echeandía
- Succeeded by: Pío Pico

Personal details
- Died: 1833
- Profession: Soldier, governor

Manuel Victoria (died 1833) was governor of the Mexican-ruled territory of Alta California from January 1831 to December 6, 1831. He died in exile. He was appointed governor on March 8, 1830 by Lucas Alamán.

== Exile ==
The revolt, called Battle of Cahuenga Pass, against his governorship, led to his abbreviated twelve-month tenure, and subsequent exile. The Battle left one man dead on either side. Although the rebels against governor retreated to the pueblo, they were victorious in defeat; the wounded governor resigned and returned to Mexico. He was not popular with the Californios. Santiago Argüello was lieutenant of the San Diego Company (1827–31), and commandant from 1830 to 1835. From 1831 to 1835, Argüello was captain of the company and took part, with his brother-in-law Agustín V. Zamorano, in the 1831 revolt against Governor Manuel Victoria]. Jose Maria Avila of the Avila family of California also helped lead the revolt. He and fifty other Los Angeles leaders were imprisoned by Alcalde Vicente Sanchez for plotting against Victoria. An army of 150 men raised in San Diego by Jose Antonio Carrillo and Pio Pico marched into the pueblo and released all prisoners. Victoria led a force from Monterey to stop the insurrection in Los Angeles. The two armies clashed at the Battle of Cahuenga Pass and Jose Maria Avila was killed. Andrés Ybarra of the Rancho Las Encinitas took part in the revolt. José López with the Rancho San Isidro Ajajolojol also join the revolt. Governor Manuel Victoria was severely wounded fighting rebellious locals at the Battle of Cahuenga Pass. Joseph John Chapman was called on to dress his wounds, which he apparently did well enough that Victoria survived. That same year, Chapman was naturalized as a Mexican citizen.

Secularization

Removal and exile was due to his nullifying the order of his predecessor Governor José María de Echeandía, to secularize the Alta California missions and distribute their landholdings as land grant ranchos in order of the Mexican secularization act of 1833.

After Victoria rescinded the order and wanted Juan Bautista Alvarado and José Castro arrested. The pair fled and were hidden by their old friend Mariano Guadalupe Vallejo, who was now adjutant at the Presidio of San Francisco.

Victoria did give out some land grants, Rancho Rosa Castilla, 3,283-acre (13.29 km^{2}) in the southwestern San Rafael Hills, in present-day Los Angeles County, California was given to Juan Ballesteros in 1831 by Victoria.

=== Replacements ===
Pío Pico first briefly replaced Manuel Victoria as governor. Then Agustín V. Zamorano in the north, and José María de Echeandía in the south, served as provisional governors from 1832 to 1833.

Governor José Figueroa arrived from Mexico in 1833, resolving the north-south political struggle. Secularization and Mexican land grants resumed with Governor Figueroa.

== See also ==
- List of pre-statehood governors of California
- List of Ranchos of California

Rancho Tularcitos (Gomez) legal advisor to Governor Manuel Victoria.
