= María Ygnacia López de Carrillo =

Original grantee of the land that is now Santa Rosa, California (1793–1849)

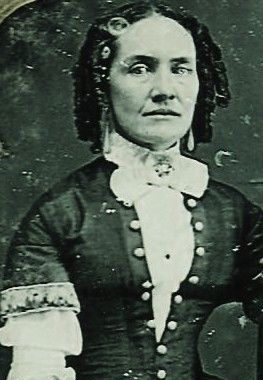
- Born: January 31, 1793; San Diego, California
- Died: February 28, 1849 (aged 56); Sonoma, California

Doña María Ygnacia López de Carrillo (January 31, 1793 – February 28, 1849) was a Californio ranchera. She was the founder of Santa Rosa, California, United States. She married into the prominent Carrillo family of California and was the ancestor of numerous prominent Californians.

== Biography ==
Ygnacia was born to Juan Francisco Lopez and Maria Feliciana Arballo on January 31, 1793, and baptized Maria Ygnacia de la Candelaria Lopez. She was baptized in the chapel of the Presidio of San Diego. Her father was a soldier of the guard in San Gabriel. Her mother was a mulatta who had accompanied the Anza Expedition as far as San Gabriel. Her father died when she was 7.

On September 3, 1809, Ygnacia married Joaquin Victor Carrillo, a soldier and member of the Carrillo family of San Diego. With Joaquin, she had thirteen children, twelve of whom survived to adulthood. Several went on to play notable roles in the early history of California. In 1821, Francisco María Ruiz, comandante of the Presidio of San Diego, built the family an adobe residence on the flats below the Presidio, where they lived for more than a decade. A portion of the Ruiz adobe, designated "Casa de Carrillo", still stands. After Joaquin's death circa 1836, Ygnacia and her nine unmarried children traveled north by ox-cart over 500 miles (800 km) to Sonoma, where they stayed with her son-in-law Mariano Guadalupe Vallejo.

In 1838, Ygnacia got Vallejo's permission to settle in an area north of Sonoma, along Santa Rosa Creek. Her sons, with help from native people and her son-in-law Salvador, built a large adobe, now known as "Carrillo Adobe", near the creek. In 1841, Governor pro tem Manuel Jimeno confirmed her possession by granting her 8,885 acres (3,596 ha) of land, designated as the Rancho Cabeza de Santa Rosa. It was one of only a handful of California land grants made to a single woman. Ygnacia supervised the farming on her rancho, where wheat, barley, oats, corn, beans, peas, lentils, watermelons, and muskmelons were grown. Her son Ramon managed her livestock, which included 1,500 horses, 3,000 cattle, and sheep. She became fluent in the language of the native people.

During the Bear Flag Revolt of 1846, her son Julio and two of her sons-in-law were imprisoned at Sutter's Fort. The rancho's livestock, weapons, and provisions were confiscated.

In 1849, a year after Mexico ceded California to the United States, Ygnacia died. Her remains were interred in the chapel of the Mission San Francisco de Solano in Sonoma.

== Carrillo Adobe ==
The Carrillo Adobe is a historic building. A Franciscan outpost named Assistencia Santa Rosa de Lima was begun on the site in sometime around 1829, but the project was abandoned due to secularization.

After Ygnacia's death, her son-in-law David Mallagh established a trading post and tavern in the adobe. Santa Rosa's first post office was located in the adobe. The trading business continued under various owners into the 1860s. The land passed to Gustav Hahman, who turned it into an orchard. In 1950, Archbishop John Joseph Mitty purchased the land for building the Cathedral of Saint Eugene and its associated school. The Diocese of Santa Rosa erected a chain-link fence around the ruins and made plans to restore the adobe, but these plans never came to fruition.

When surveyed in 1962, all that remained of the adobe was a three-room structure, 83 feet (25 m) by 21 feet (6.4 m) with a 10-foot (3.0 m) veranda on all sides.

In 2005, the City of Santa Rosa gave tentative approval for a developer's plan to build up to 165 units on the parcel and spend more than $300,000 to prevent further deterioration of the adobe itself. Archeological investigations in 2006 revealed that the adobe was built on sturdy stone footings. The 2008 financial crisis delayed the project. In 2012, vandals broke through the fence and stole some posts and beams, which were later found in a nearby encampment.

Sheltered by a metal-roofed pole structure, the ruins of Carillo Adobe are still visible at 38.4485°N 122.6836°W behind the Cathedral of Saint Eugene, near the intersection of Montgomery Drive and Franquette Avenue in Santa Rosa.

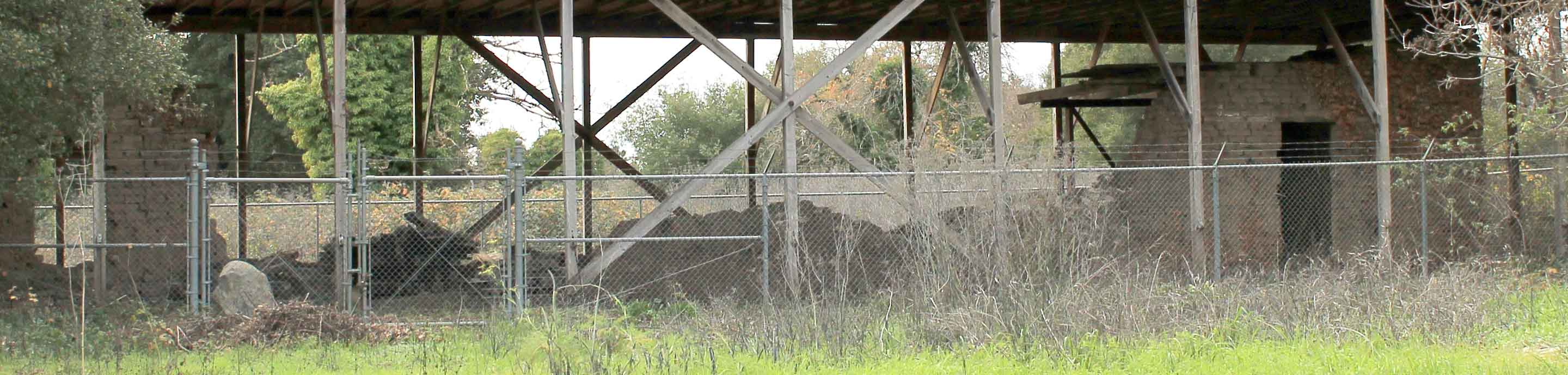

== Descendants ==
=== Daughters ===
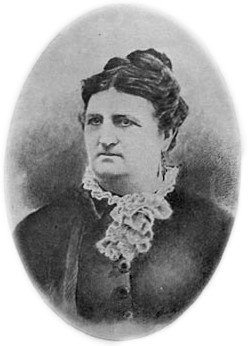
Josefa Carrillo, wife of Henry Fitch

- Maria Antonia Natalia "Josefa" (November 27, 1810 – January 1893) was Ygnacia's eldest daughter. In 1829 she eloped to Valparaíso in order to marry Henry D. Fitch (May 7, 1799 – January 13, 1849), a sea-captain from Massachusetts. They had eleven children. In 1841, Fitch was granted Rancho Sotoyome in the Alexander Valley north of Rancho Cabeza de Santa Rosa.
- María Ramona de Luz (July 1812 – December 1888) married Captain José Antonio Romualdo Pacheco, a soldier from Guanajuato. He was killed in 1831 at the Battle of Cahuenga Pass. She was granted Rancho Suey near present-day Santa Maria, California that same year. She later married Captain John D. Wilson, a Scotsman.
- Maria de la Luz Eustaquia (May 18, 1813 – May 18, 1890) married Jose Manuel Salvador Vallejo (March 3, 1813 – February 18, 1876), the younger brother of General Mariano Guadalupe Vallejo.
- Francisca Maria Felipa Benicia (August 23, 1815 – January 30, 1891) married General Vallejo himself on March 6, 1832. The city of Benicia was named after her. In 1834, Vallejo was granted Rancho Petaluma south of Rancho Cabeza de Santa Rosa.
- Maria Marta (born 29 July 1826, died October 1905) married Jose Joaquin Victor Carrillo Montano from Cabo San Lucas, BCS, MX, in 1855 at Santa Rosa, California.
- Juana de Jesús "Juanita" (born March 1829) married David Mallagh, an Irish sea-captain, in 1850.
- Maria Felicidad de la Augusta (March 1833 – July 23, 1856) married Victor Castro.

=== Sons ===
- Joaquín Victor II (1820 – 1899) was Ygnacia's eldest son. He was elected mayor of Sonoma in 1846 and was imprisoned during the Bear Flag Revolt. He was granted Rancho Llano de Santa Rosa west of Rancho Cabeza de Santa Rosa. He fought at the Battle of Olompali in 1846.
- Juan Bautista died of poisoning in 1841.
- Jose Ramon (February 1821 – May 1864) sold Casa de Carrillo to Lorenzo Soto. Later he fought at the Battle of Olompali and the Battle of San Pasqual. He married Vicenta Sepulveda de Yorba in February 1847.
- Jose de los Dolores (born 1824).
- Julio Maria Tomas (1824 – 1889) was imprisoned at Sutter's Fort in 1846 after attempting to deliver a message to his brothers-in-law. After Ygnacia's death, he inherited the bulk of Rancho Cabeza de Santa Rosa.
- Jose de la Luz (February 27, 1831 – March 7, 1831) died in infancy.

=== Grandchildren ===
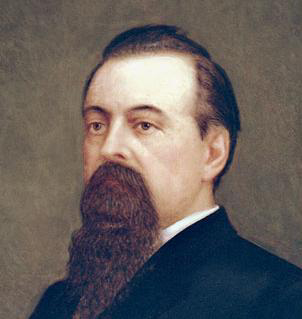
Governor Romualdo Pacheco

- José Antonio Romualdo Pacheco Jr. (October 31, 1831 – January 23, 1899) was a son of Maria Ramona by Romualdo Pacheco, her first husband. On February 27, 1875, he became the State of California's twelfth governor, its first California-born governor, and its first governor of Mexican ancestry.

== Namesakes ==
- Maria Carrillo High School, a public school established in Santa Rosa in 1996.

== See also ==
- Alta California
- List of Ranchos of California
- Rancho Petaluma Adobe
