= Battle of Cahuenga Pass =

Part of California history (1831)

Date	December 5, 1831
Location	Cahuenga Pass 34°7′50.28″N 118°20′59.56″W
Result	Resignation of Governor Victoria

Belligerents
Rebel forces	Alta Californian government

Commanders and leaders
José María de Echeandía; José María Ávila †	Manuel Victoria (WIA); José Romualdo Pacheco †

Casualties and losses
1 killed	1 killed; 1 wounded

The Battle of Cahuenga Pass of 1831 was fought at Cahuenga Pass near Los Angeles between the unpopular Mexican Governor of California (Manuel Victoria), and a force assembled by wealthy local landowners.

Only two men, the lancer Pacheco on the government side and a rebel Jose Avila, were killed. Victoria was severely wounded.

== Background ==
A small group made up of wealthier citizens of Alta California united and petitioned Governor Victoria for democratic reforms. Victoria called two of the men, José Antonio Carrillo and Abel Stearns, "traitors", and ordered their execution. He later stayed the sentences and had the men banished from Alta California.

The previous governor, Jose Maria de Echeandia, had been more popular, so the original dissidents, including the two "traitors," along with several other land owners, suggested to him that Victoria's stay as governor would shortly be coming to an abrupt end. They built up a small army, marched into Los Angeles, and "captured" the town. Victoria gathered a small army to drive them off, leading it himself. The forces met on December 5, 1831, at Cahuenga Pass, with Captain Portilla in charge of the rebels.

== The battle ==
The opposing armies were made up of brothers, sons, uncles, nephews, and friends, who though angry at one-another preferred to avoid mortal combat.

Victoria had half the troops of his opponents. Undaunted, he ordered his men to fire. They did so, but aimed their volley over their adversaries' heads. The rebels answered with a similar reply, and a stand-off ensued.

Alone among the government troops Captain Jose Antonio Romualdo Pacheco (father of the future governor Romualdo Pacheco) interpreted Victoria's order as a command to charge the enemy on horseback, spurring on his mount with outstretched lance. When he discovered he was alone he halted between the two forces. Jose Maria Avila of the rebel army, a former alcalde of the Pueblo of Los Angeles, took offense and went out to challenge Pacheco in mounted combat.

Excellent horsemen, the pair were evenly matched. After three unsuccessful charges, Pacheco finally knocked Avila's lance to the ground. Infuriated, Avila drew his pistol and shot Pacheco from the saddle, killing him. Shocked at his reflexive act, Avila sat on his horse in a kind of horrified stupor.

Upset at such unchivalrous behavior, Governor Victoria, drew his pistol and shot Avila dead.

This angered Captain Portilla, who charged Victoria and put his lance through the Governor's face, ripping off a chunk of flesh and cartilage. Victoria fell writhing at the wound. Both forces broke off the conflict.

== Aftermath ==
Governor Victoria survived, but subsequently resigned the governorship of Alta California. The previous governor, José María de Echeandía, resumed his role until Jose Figueroa took over on January 14, 1833.

Governor Victoria's wounds were tended to by Joseph Chapman, a naturalized U.S. immigrant living in the area.

This battle should not be confused with the Battle of Providencia (also known as the Second Battle of Cahuenga Pass).
