= Rancho Cabeza de Santa Rosa =

Mexican land grant in California

Coordinates: 38.45°N 122.70°W

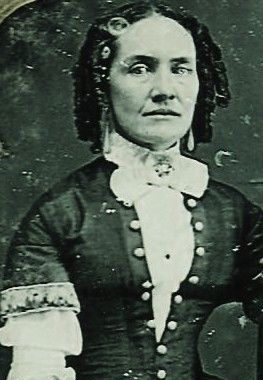
María Ygnacia López de Carrillo, founder of Santa Rosa and grantee of Rancho Cabeza de Santa Rosa.

Rancho Cabeza de Santa Rosa was an 8,885-acre (35.96 km^{2}) Mexican land grant in present-day Sonoma County, California given in 1841 by Governor pro tem Manuel Jimeno to María Ygnacia López. The grant was along Santa Rosa Creek, and encompassed present-day Santa Rosa, California.

== History ==
María Ygnacia de la Candelaria López (1793–1849) married Joaquin Victor Carrillo (1793–1835) in San Diego in 1809. When Carrillo died in 1835, three of their twelve children were already married: Maria Antonia (known as Josefa) to Henry D. Fitch, Maria Ramona to José Antonio Romualdo Pacheco, and Francisca Benicia to Mariano Guadalupe Vallejo. María Ygnacia Lopez de Carrillo and her 9 unmarried children left San Diego in 1837 and moved to Sonoma, California where her daughter Francisca Benicia Carrillo (1815-1891) lived with her husband General Vallejo. General Vallejo was a critical factor in obtaining the two square league grant in 1841.

Eldest son, Joaquin Carrillo (1820–1899), was granted Rancho Llano de Santa Rosa just west of his mother's property by Governor Manuel Micheltorena in 1844. Son Juan Bautista (1825–1841) died of poisoning. Daughter María de la Luz Esquatuia Carrillo (1814–1893) married her brother-in-law Salvador Vallejo and set up her home in Sonoma. María López Carrillo died in 1849 and was buried at Mission San Francisco Solano in Sonoma.

Seven claims for Rancho Cabeza de Santa Rosa were filed with the Public Land Commission in 1852.

Land Case No. (Northern District ND)	Claimant	Notes	Patented area	Patent Date
Land Case 124 ND	Julio Maria Tomas Carrillo	Son Julio Maria Tomas Carrillo (1824–1889) inherited the bulk of the grant.	4,500 acres (18.2 km^{2})	1866
Land Case 125 ND	Juana de Jesús Mallagh	Daughter Juana de Jesús (1829– ) married sea captain David Mallagh.	256 acres (1.0 km^{2})	1879
Land Case 126 ND	James Eldridge	Eldridge, California is named after James Eldridge	1,668 acres (6.8 km^{2})	1880
Land Case 127 ND	Felicidad Carrillo de Castro	Daughter Felicidad Carrillo (1833 - 1856) married Victor Castro.	336 acres (1.4 km^{2})	1881
Land Case 128 ND	Jacob R. Mayer and J. G. Isham		1,485 acres (6.0 km^{2})	1879
Land Case 235 ND	John Hendley	Dr. John Hendley (1820–1875) was born in Lexington, Kentucky, had been assistant surgeon in a Missouri volunteer regiment, and came to California in 1850, settling first in Sonoma but moving to Santa Rosa when it became the county seat in 1854. He moved to his farm in 1863, where he died in 1875. He was Sonoma County's first treasurer and clerk, and claimed one square mile (640 acres (2.6 km^{2})).	640 acres (2.6 km^{2})	1879
Land Case 258 ND	Oliver Beaulieu	Oliver Beaulieu, a French-Canadian fur trapper, bought 640 acres (2.6 km^{2}) on the north side of Santa Rosa Creek from Julio Carrillo in 1850. Beaulieu laid out a town named Franklin in 1853, which preceded the founding of Santa Rosa. But Franklin did not survive, when Santa Rosa became the county seat in 1854, and the residents moved the mile and a half to Santa Rosa.	rejected	

Son José Ramon Carrillo (1821–1864) was killed in 1864. Daughter Maria Marta Juana Carrillo (1826–1905) married Jose de Cruz Pilar Carrillo.

== Historic sites of the Rancho ==
- Carrillo Adobe. The home of the Carrillo family.
