= Ila =

Ila or ILA may refer to:

== Government ==
- Ila Detention and Security Prison, a prison in Bærum, Norway
- Israel Land Administration
- Israel Land Authority, the successor agency to the Israel Land Administration

== Organizations ==
- Idaho Library Association
- Illinois Library Association
- Immersive Light and Art, an arts organisation in Adelaide, Australia
- Indian Laser Association
- Indian Library Association
- Institute of Landscape Architects, in UK
- Institute for Legislative Action (NRA-ILA), political lobbying arm of the National Rifle Association of America
- International Law Association
- International Linguistic Association
- International Literacy Association
- International Longevity Alliance, an international nonprofit organization promoting life extension
- International Longshoremen's Association, North American labor union
- Iowa Library Association

== Places ==
- Ila, China, former name of Huiyuan in Xinjiang
- Ila, Georgia, a community in the United States
- Ila, Osun, a local government area in Nigeria
- Ila, Trondheim, a neighborhood of Trondheim, Norway
  - Ila tram stop, a Trondheim tram stop
- Islay (Scots: Ila), an island of Scotland

== Other uses ==
- Caol Ila, whisky made in Islay, Scotland
- Ila (given name), includes a list of people and fictional or mythological entities with the given name Ila
- Ila birthmark
- Ila people, an ethnic group in Zambia
  - Ila language (ISO 639 language code: ilb), spoken by the Ila people
- Ile Ape language (ISO 639 language code: ila)
- Individual Learning Account, a scheme designed to boost adult education in the UK, 1999–2001
- In-line light amplifier, an optical amplifier
- Internationale Luft- und Raumfahrtausstellung or ILA Berlin Air Show, annual German aerospace exhibition
- MV Ila, ship in service 1947–52

== See also ==
- ILAS (disambiguation)
- Island (disambiguation)
- Isla (disambiguation)
- Isle (disambiguation)
- Ile (disambiguation)
- 2ILA, an Australian radio station
