= Chumash Peak =

Mountain in San Luis Obispo County, California

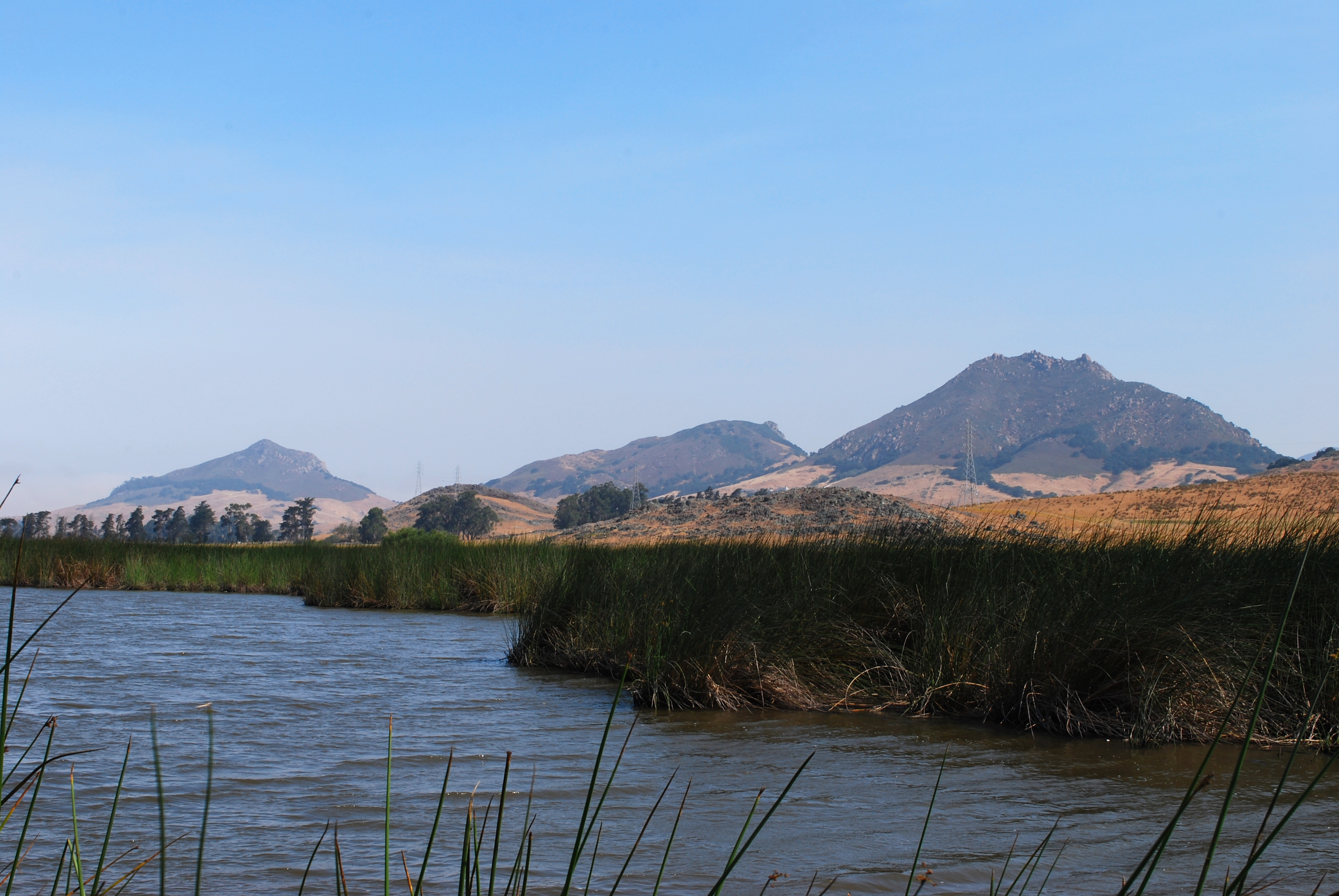
- Chumash Peak is the middle of the three peaks.

Highest point
- Elevation: 1,268 ft (386 m) NGVD 29
- Coordinates: 35°18′30″N 120°42′23″W

Geography
- Location: San Luis Obispo County, California
- Parent range: Nine Sisters
- Topo map: USGS San Luis Obispo

Geology
- Rock age: 20 million years
- Mountain type: Volcanic plug

Chumash Peak is a 1,257 ft (383 m) mountain in San Luis Obispo County, California. It is just northwest of San Luis Obispo, on the south side of California State Route 1.

The peak is one of the volcanic plugs known as the Nine Sisters, between Cerro Romauldo to its West and Bishop Peak to its East.

In 1964 the hill was named in recognition of the Chumash Indians who lived in the area due to efforts by Louisiana Dart, curator of the San Luis Obispo County Museum. Access to the peak is currently unavailable.

The peak was quarried in the 1970s for foundation material in the construction of new buildings on the Cuesta College campus nearby.
