= Isla =

Isla or ISLA may refer to:

== Organizations ==
- International Securities Lending Association, a trade association
- International School of Los Angeles
- International Bilingual School, later named International School of Los Angeles

== People ==
- Isla (given name)
- Víctor Isla, Peruvian politician and a Congressman representing Loreto for the 2006–2011 term
- Mauricio Isla, Chilean football player

== Music ==
- Isla (Portico Quartet album), a 2009 album by Portico Quartet

== Places ==
- Isla, Queensland, a locality in the Shire of Banana, Australia
- Mt. Izla, location of ancient Christian monasteries, on the border between Turkey and Syria
- Isla (Cantabria), a village in the Spanish region of Cantabria
- River Isla, Perthshire, a tributary of the River Tay in Perthshire, Scotland; flows through Glen Isla and Strathmore
- River Isla, Moray a tributary of the River Deveron in North-East Scotland; flows through Keith in Banffshire
- Senglea, Isla (Senglea), a fortified city in the east of Malta, mainly in the Grand Harbour area
- Isla, Texas, an unincorporated community in the United States
- Isla, Valenzuela, a settlement in the Philippines
- Isla, Veracruz, a town in Mexico
- Isla, a village in Hodoșa Commune, Mureș County, Romania

== See also ==
- ILAS (disambiguation)
- Islay (disambiguation)
- Island (disambiguation)
- Isle (disambiguation)
- Ila (disambiguation)
- Ile (disambiguation)
