= Islas =

Islas is a surname. Notable people with the surname include:

- Arturo Islas (1938–1991), professor of English and a novelist from Texas
- Daniel Islas (born 1979), Argentine football goalkeeper
- Luis Islas (born 1965), former football goalkeeper
- Mauricio Islas (born 1973), Mexican actor best known for his work in telenovelas
- Sabino Islas (born 1917), Mexican boxer who competed in the 1936 Summer Olympics
- Therese Islas Helgesson (born 1983), Swedish handball player

== See also ==
- Isla (disambiguation)
