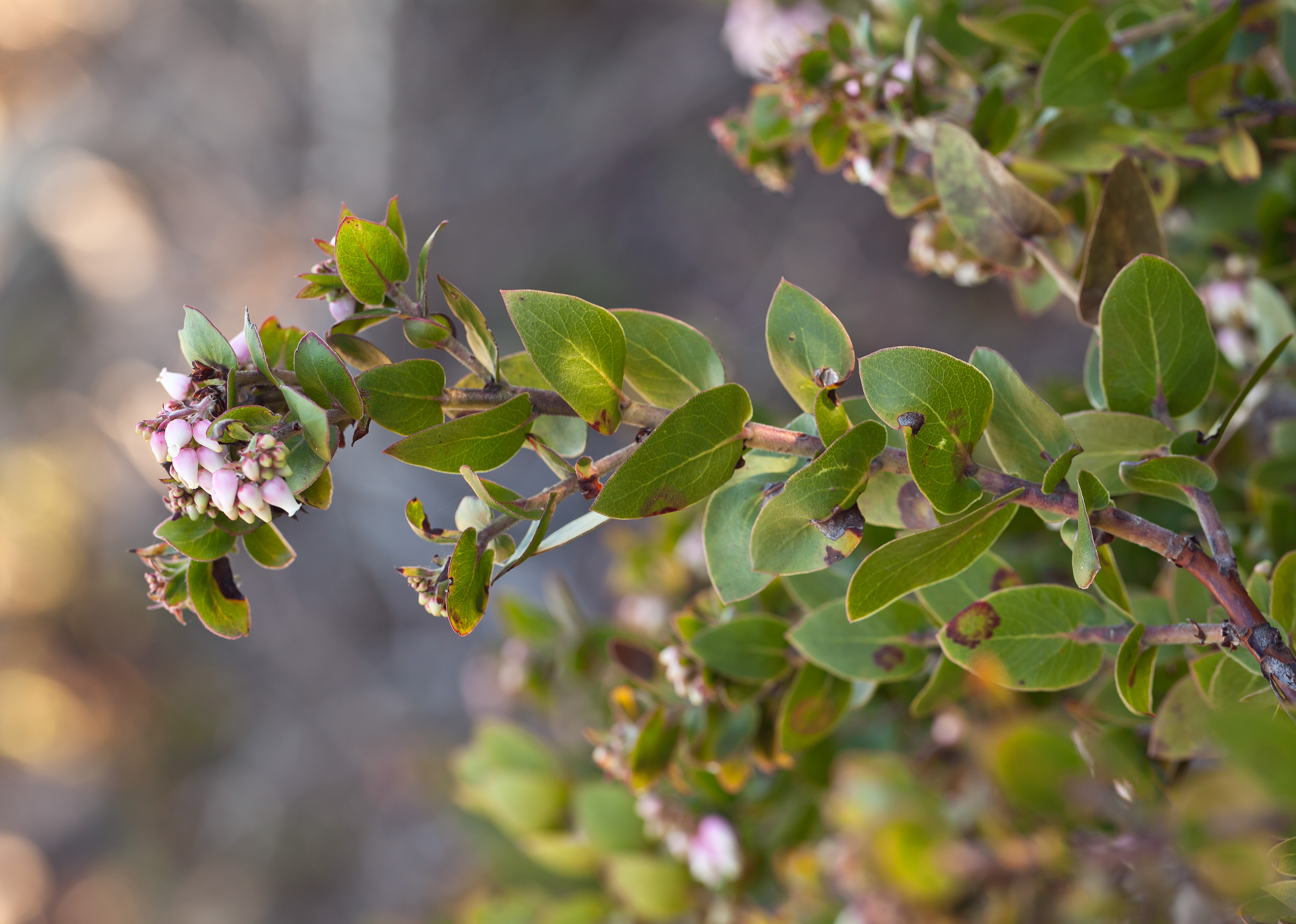

Conservation status
- Critically Imperiled (NatureServe)

Scientific classification
- Kingdom: Plantae
- Clade: Tracheophytes
- Clade: Angiosperms
- Clade: Eudicots
- Clade: Asterids
- Order: Ericales
- Family: Ericaceae
- Genus: Arctostaphylos
- Species: A. osoensis

Binomial name
- Arctostaphylos osoensis P.V.Wells

= Arctostaphylos osoensis =

Species of flowering plant

Arctostaphylos osoensis is a species of manzanita known by the common name Oso manzanita. It is endemic to San Luis Obispo County, California, where it is known from only two occurrences on the northern edge of the Los Osos Valley. It grows exclusively on volcanic dacite from the Morro Rock-Islay Hill Complex associated with the Nine Sisters.

== Description ==
This is a spreading shrub reaching at least a meter in height and known to grow over four meters tall. The bark is grayish in color and shreddy. The foliage is dense with shiny, pointed, smooth-edged or toothed green to reddish leaves each up to 3 centimeters long.

The inflorescence is a loose bunch of urn-shaped manzanita flowers each about 6 millimeters long. The fruit is a hairless drupe between 0.5 and one centimeter wide containing several rounded seeds.

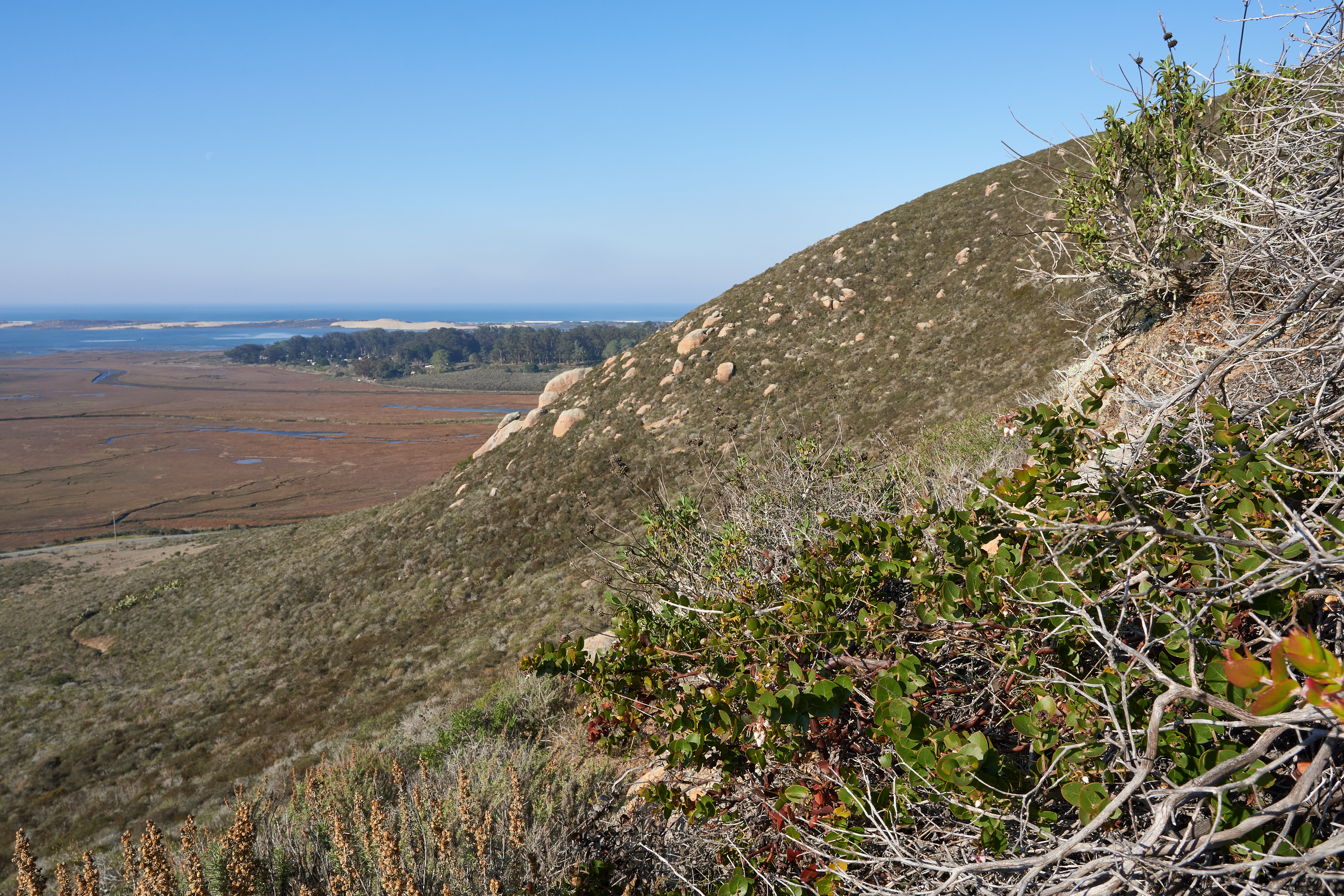
With habitat on the slopes of Cerro Cabrillo

== Identification ==
This species can come into contact with Arctostaphylos morroensis to the south, where it can be distinguished by the heart-shaped leaves which clasp the stem on osoensis as opposed to the more typical leaves with a small stem connecting to the branch on morroensis. While not diagnostic, osoensis also tends to be lower growing than the larger morroensis.
