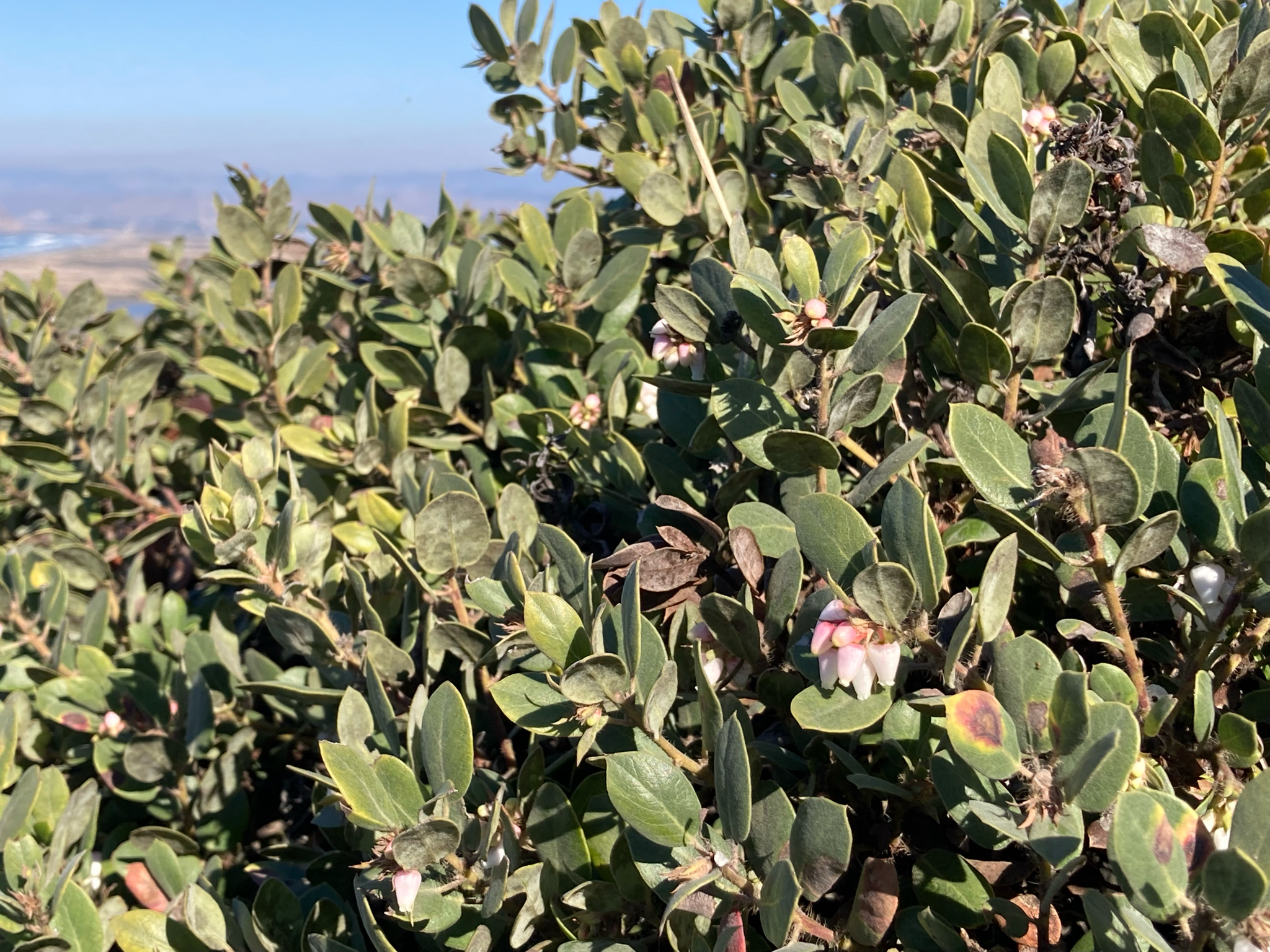

Conservation status
- Critically Imperiled (NatureServe)

Scientific classification
- Kingdom: Plantae
- Clade: Embryophytes
- Clade: Tracheophytes
- Clade: Angiosperms
- Clade: Eudicots
- Clade: Asterids
- Order: Ericales
- Family: Ericaceae
- Genus: Arctostaphylos
- Species: A. morroensis

Binomial name
- Arctostaphylos morroensis Wiesl. & B. Schrieb.

= Arctostaphylos morroensis =

Species of flowering plant

Arctostaphylos morroensis is a species of manzanita known by the common name Morro manzanita. This shrub is endemic to San Luis Obispo County, California, where it is known only from the vicinity of Morro Bay.

== Distribution ==
There are 18 occurrences of the Arctostaphylos morroensis plant, and it is abundant in some local areas. It is largely limited to a specific type of substrate known as "Baywood fine sands", a type of sandy soil which originated in the Pleistocene as windblown sand dunes. The plant is found on less than 900 acres of coastal sage scrub and chaparral habitat, sometimes forming monotypic stands on hillsides.

Two thirds of its habitat is privately owned, some of it is slated for development, and its habitat requirements are narrow; these and other problems led to the plant's being listed as a threatened species in 1994. Some of the plants are protected within Montaña de Oro State Park.

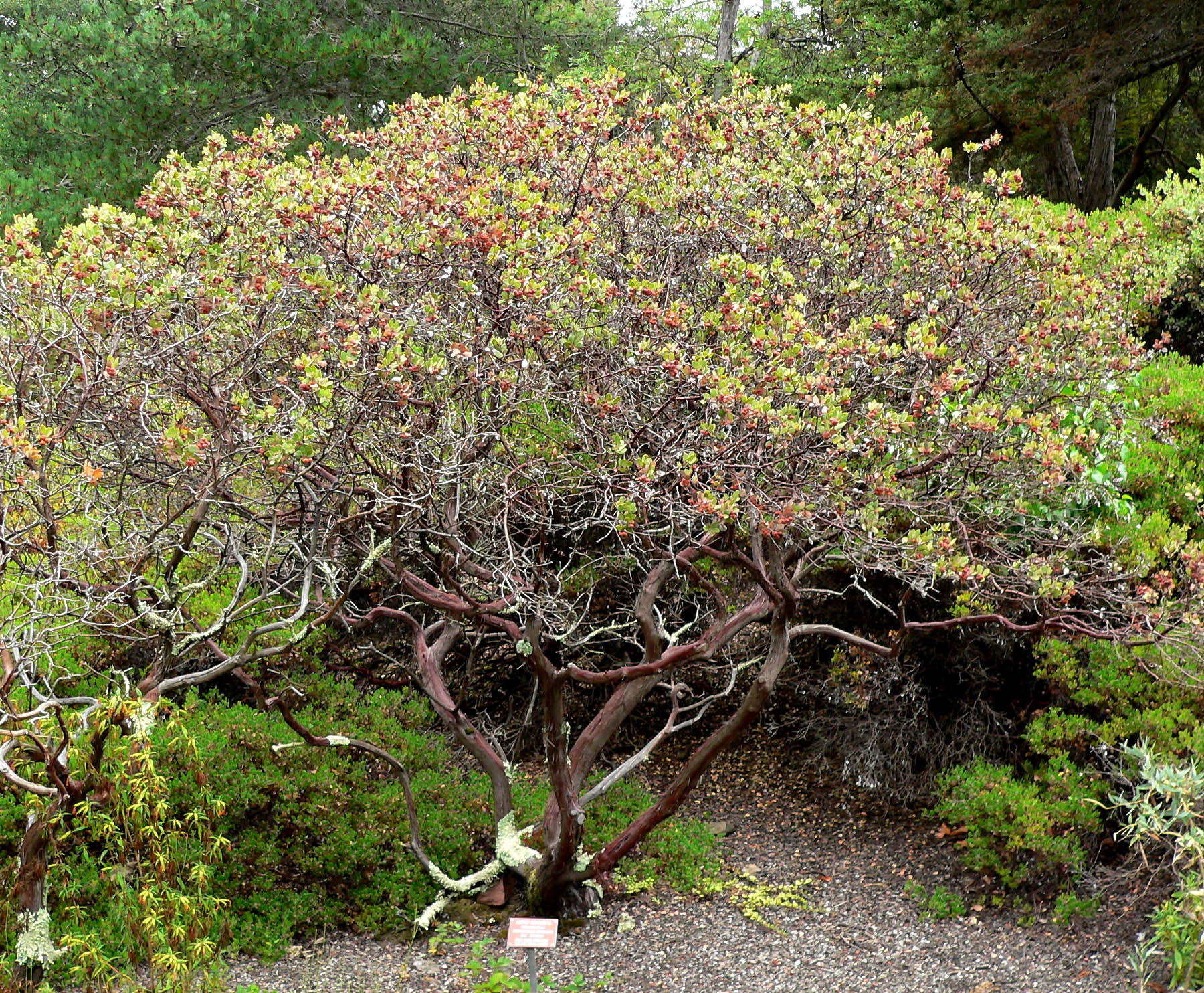
Growing in cultivation

== Description ==
Arctostaphylos morroensis is a spreading shrub, reaching up to 4 meters in height but generally staying wider than tall. It has shreddy red-gray bark and whiskery bristles on the smaller branches and twigs. The leaves are oval-shaped and slightly convex, dark green on the upper surface and duller gray-green beneath. Plentiful flowers hang in dense clusters on short pedicels during the winter months. They are usually very light pink, urn-shaped, and hairy inside. The fruits are fuzzy red drupes each about a centimeter wide.

== Identification ==
At the northern extent of its range, this species can overlap with Arctostaphylos osoensis. The two species can be separated by leaf structure: osoensis has heart-shaped leaves which seem to clasp the stem, while morroensis has more typical leaves with a small stem connecting the leaf to the main branch. A. osoensis is also largely restricted to volcanic outcroppings associated with the Nine Sisters, but on occasion morroensis can also occur on this formation, so this alone is not sufficient to distinguish the species.

== Cultivation ==
The Arctostaphylos morroensis plant is cultivated as a landscaping ornamental plant, for California native plant, drought tolerant, and natural habitat gardens.

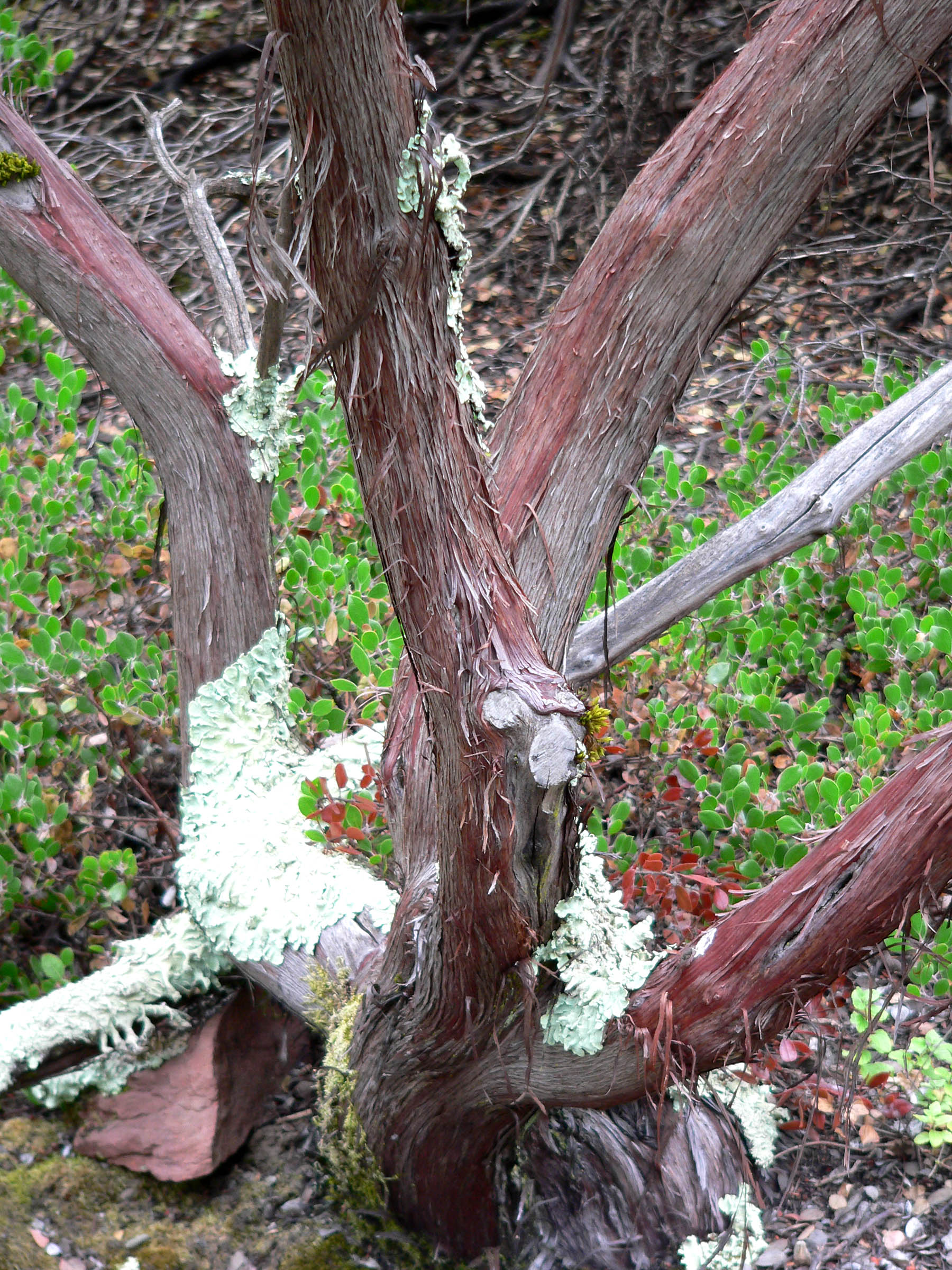
Bark

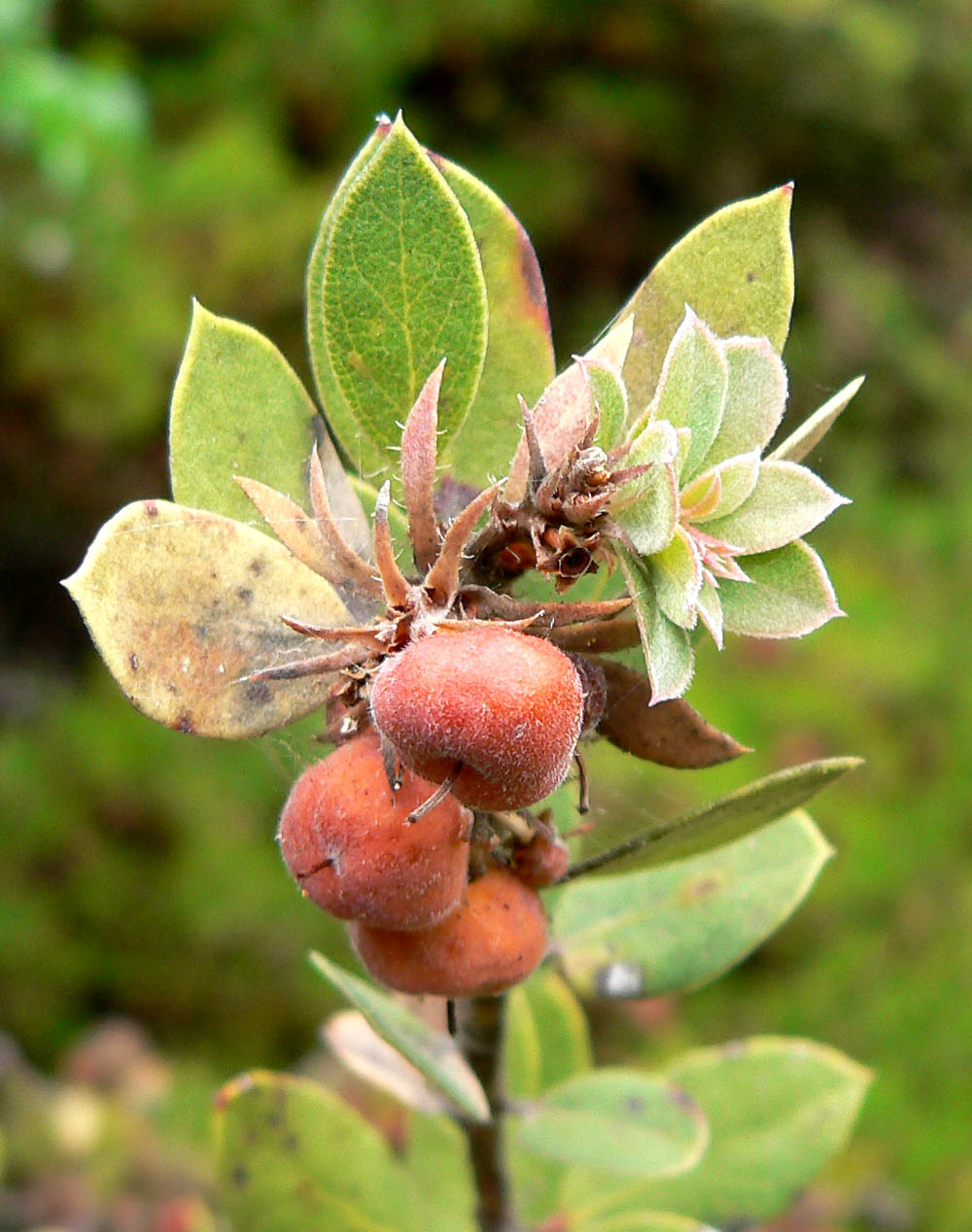
Leaves and fruit

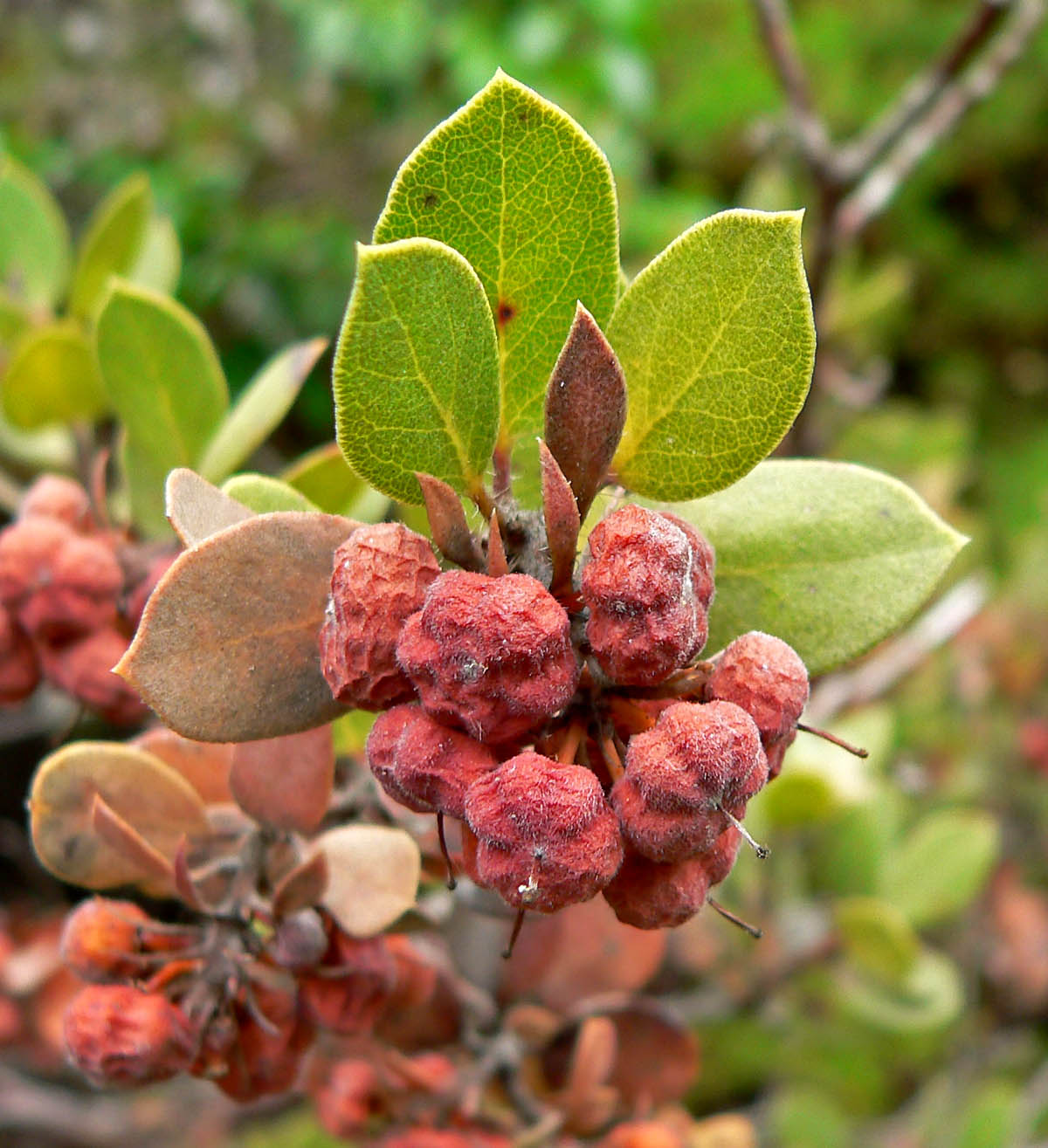
Leaves and fruit
