= Cerro San Luis Obispo =

Mountain in San Luis Obispo, California, United States

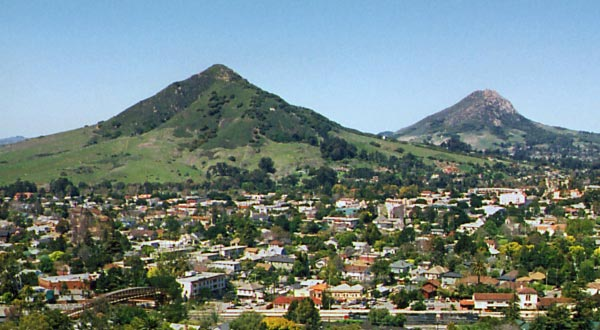
- Cerro San Luis Obispo (left)

Highest point
- Elevation: 1,292 ft (394 m) NGVD 29
- Coordinates: 35°16′58″N 120°40′50″W

Naming
- English translation: Bishop Saint Louis Hill
- Language of name: Spanish

Geography
- Location: San Luis Obispo County, California, U.S.
- Parent range: Santa Lucia Range
- Topo map: San Luis Obispo

Geology
- Rock age: 20 million years
- Mountain type: Volcanic plug

Cerro San Luis Obispo (Obispeño: łpɨłhɨtšnuka) is a 1,292 feet (394 m) mountain in San Luis Obispo, California. It is part of the chain of peaks called the Nine Sisters. It is a common spot for hiking, jogging and mountain biking, and has steep terrain. Below the west side of the visible peak, there is a large plateau with a large wooden stage on the east end. The large white "M" present on the east face derives from Mission College Preparatory Catholic High School.

== History ==
Some time around 1900, an American Civil War veteran, G. W. Chandler, lived on the mountain and planted lemons and oranges. The trees still overlook the city and are watered by two springs. The Lemon Grove Trail at the base of the mountain takes its name from these groves.

Around 1958, a local business owner, Alex Madonna, purchased a ranch on a portion of the slopes of Cerro San Luis Obispo, and constructed the Madonna Inn at its base.

== Activities ==
There are several trails on the mountain that are used for hiking, jogging and mountain biking. The primary trail head is at the end of Marsh Street which provides access to the Open Space and Lemon Grove Loop. A dirt road accessible from Lemon Grove Loop leads to the summit. There is a second road cut to the summit which has been abandoned and eroded to a narrow rocky path giving it the name "Rock Garden" and making it a popular descent for mountain bikers. There is also a trail that encircles the mountain about one third the way up.

360° panorama from the summit of Cerro San Luis Obispo. Bishop Peak is to the left. In the left-center lies the Cal Poly campus. Laguna Lake appears on the right. Photographed on an early November morning.

== Geology ==
Cerro San Luis, composed of igneous rock, is the core of an ancient volcano which came up through Franciscan sedimentary rocks.

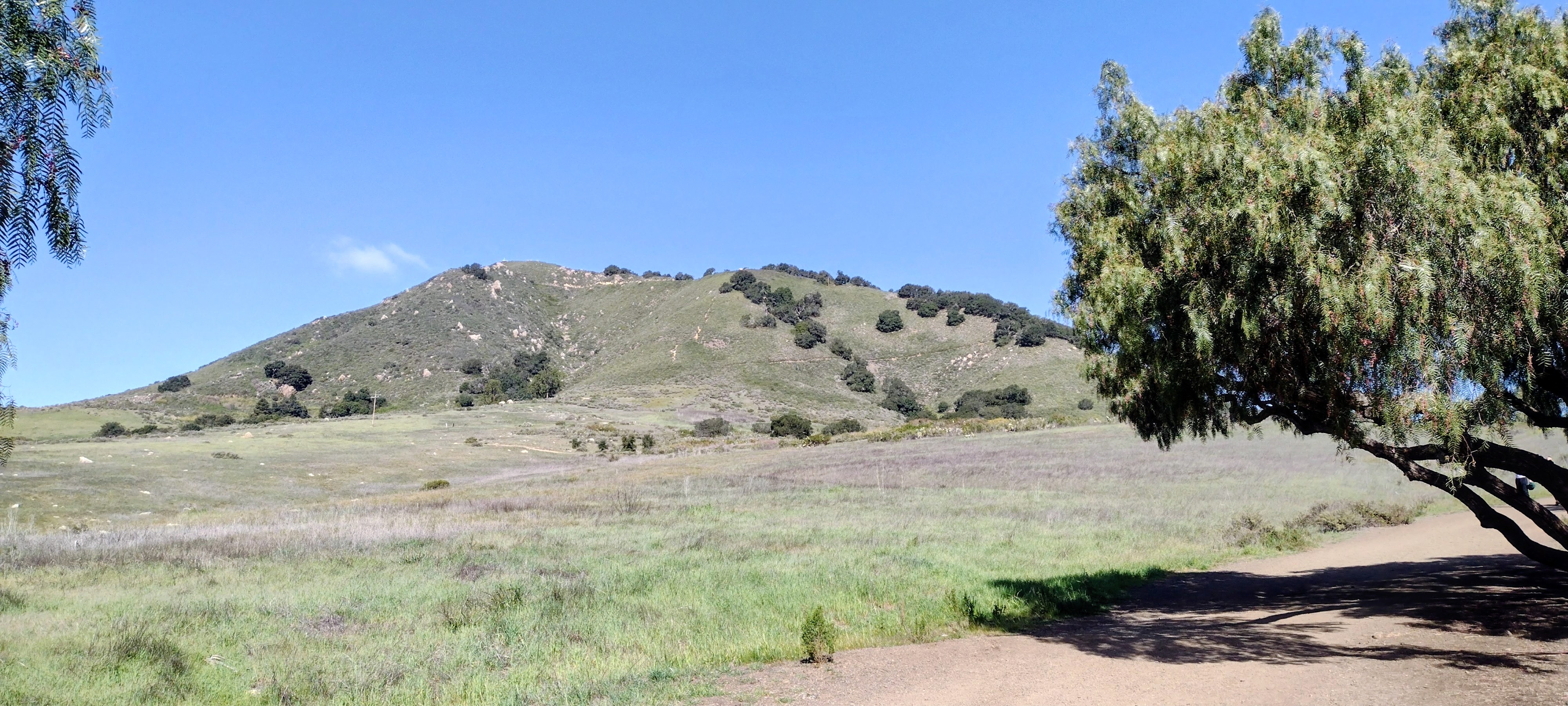
