= Cerro Romualdo =

Mountain in San Luis Obispo County, California, United States

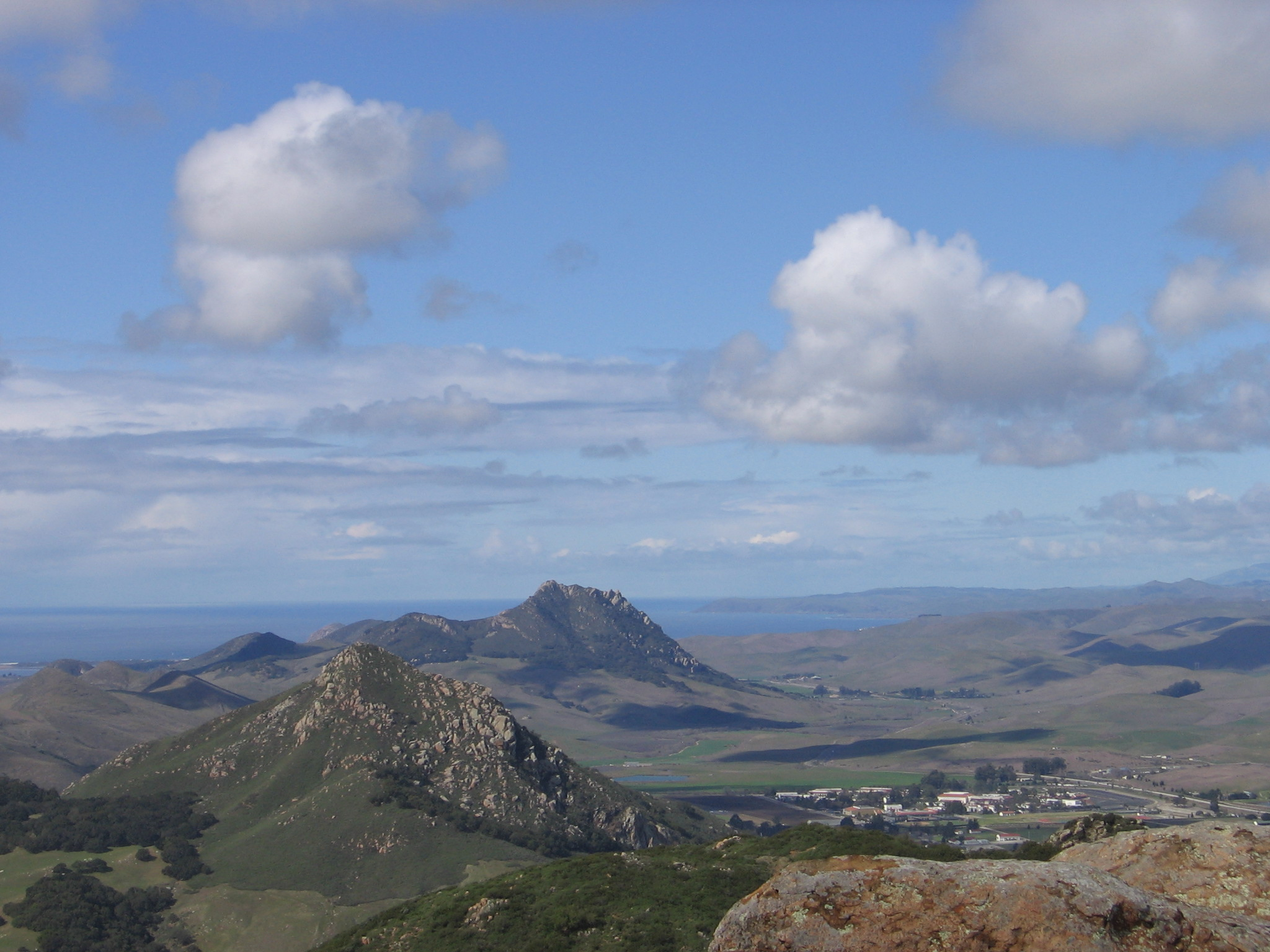
- Cerro Romualdo pictured in the bottom left corner. The National Guard base can be seen to the right of it. The photograph is looking northwest from the top of Bishop Peak.

Highest point
- Elevation: 1,300 ft (396 m) NAVD 88
- Coordinates: 35°18′51″N 120°43′37″W

Naming
- English translation: Romualdo Hill
- Language of name: Spanish

Geography
- Location within California
- Location: San Luis Obispo County, California
- Parent range: Santa Lucia Range
- Topo map: San Luis Obispo

Geology
- Rock age: 20 million years
- Mountain type: Volcanic plug
- Volcanic field: Nine Sisters

Climbing
- Easiest route: Not open to the public

Cerro Romualdo is a 1,300-foot (396 m) mountain in San Luis Obispo County, California. The mountain is the fifth in a series of volcanic plugs called the Nine Sisters. Until 1964 the mountain was officially known as Romualdo Peak.

The mountain is named for a Chumash man who received the 117-acre (0.47 km^{2}) Rancho Huerta de Romualdo Mexican land grant from Pío Pico, the last Mexican Governor of Alta California. Huerta de Romualdo means Romualdo's kitchen garden or orchard in Spanish. He sold the land to Captain John Wilson in 1846.

In the 1890s, rock from Cerro Romualdo was used in the construction of the Southern Pacific Railroad.

Cerro Romualdo is owned by the State of California, and is used by the California National Guard at adjacent Camp San Luis Obispo for fitness training.
