= ILAS (disambiguation) =

ILAS, ilas or variant, may refer to:

- International Linear Algebra Society
- Ilas, a barrio in Dao, Capiz, Philippines, composed of Ilas Sur and Ilas Norte
- ILAS Air (ICAO airline code: ILC), see List of airline codes (I)
- ILAS-3, a torpedo launcher built by Whitehead SpA

== See also ==
- ila (disambiguation)
- isla (disambiguation)
