= Madonna Inn =

Motel in San Luis Obispo, California

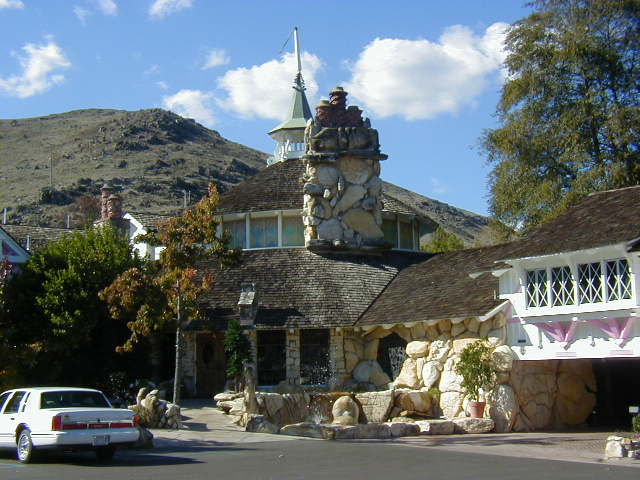

- Location in California Madonna Inn (the United States)

General information
- Location: United States, 100 Madonna Road; San Luis Obispo, California
- Coordinates: 35.2675°N 120.67472°W
- Opening: December 1958
- Owner: Alex and Phyllis Madonna
- Operator: Alex and Phyllis Madonna

Technical details
- Floor count: 1 x 2-story building 2 x 1-story buildings

Design and construction
- Developer: Alex and Phyllis Madonna

Other information
- Number of rooms: 110
- Number of suites: 28
- Number of restaurants: 4
- Parking: On-site

Website
- madonnainn.com

The Madonna Inn is a motel in San Luis Obispo, California. Opened in 1958, it quickly became a landmark on the Central Coast of California. It is noted for its unique decor, pink dining room, and themed rooms. It was created by Alex Madonna, a successful construction magnate and entrepreneur (d. April 2004), and his wife Phyllis. The inn includes a restaurant and bakery, and is located on the west side of US Route 101 and situated on the lower eastern portion of Cerro San Luis Obispo.

== Description ==
=== Motel ===
The property is adorned with a pseudo–Swiss Alps exterior and lavish common rooms accented by pink roses, Western murals, and hammered copper. The predominant exterior color is pink, which extends to the lamp posts and trash cans. Each of the 110 guest rooms and suites is uniquely designed and themed, though some tourists stop just to peek at the famous rock waterfall urinal located in the men's restroom, a feature designed by Hollywood set designer Harvey Allen Warren.

The boulders used for the inn weigh up to 209 short tons (190 t) for the exterior and 15 short tons (14 t) for the interior. A 45 short tons (41 t) boulder serves as a shared fireplace for the adjoining Madonna (#141) and Old World (#192) suites.

In 1973, there were five buildings on the 1,500-acre (610 ha) site:

Buildings at Madonna Inn
Name	Image	Guest rooms	Features
Gas station		—	
Main complex		—	Lobby, registration, restaurants, and meeting spaces
Unit 1		14 (Note: There is no room #113.)	Completed 1961. Rooms 101–115.
Unit 2		14	Completed 1962. Rooms 116–129.
Hilltop		82 (Note: Room numbers 153, 154, 159, 170, 190, 199, and 213 not used.)	Completed 1969. Rooms 130–218. Ranges in height from two to four stories.

Aiming to cater to a range of tastes, rooms were given unusual names, amenities, and themes such as "Yahoo" (#132), "Love Nest" (#183), "Old Mill" (#206), "Kona Rock" (#131), "Irish Hills" (#156), "Cloud Nine" (#161), "Just Heaven" (#184), "Hearts & Flowers" (#155), "Rock Bottom" (#143), "Austrian Suite" (#160), "Cabin Still" (#133), "Old World Suite" (#192), "Caveman Room" (#137), "Elegance" (#201), "Daisy Mae" (#138), "Safari Room" (#193), "Highway Suite" (#145), "Jungle Rock" (#139), "American Home" (#204), "Bridal Falls" (#140), and "The Carin" (#218). Some rooms are grouped thematically. For example, the rooms "Ren" (#167), "Dez" (#168), and "Vous" (#169) are a play on the French word rendezvous, and "Merry" (#164), "Go" (#165), and "Round" (#166) reference a carousel. Most of the themes were conceived by Alex and Phyllis Madonna, and some rooms were designed by Disney artist Alice Turney Williams.

=== Restaurants ===
The inn features four dining and beverage venues: the Madonna Inn Bakery & Pastry Shop, the Copper Café & Coffee Bar, Alex Madonna's Gold Rush Steak House, and the Silver Bar Cocktail & Lounge. The Copper Café is a more casual alternative to the formal steakhouse, while the bakery is noted for its signature pink cakes and confections.

== History ==
The Madonna Inn opened as a motel on December 24, 1958, upon the completion of its first twelve rooms. The Madonnas were so excited to have their first guest, they refunded his $7 room rental. Demand was sufficient to expand to forty rooms in 1959, and the main inn facility was constructed in 1960. Reportedly, when architect Richard Neutra stayed at the inn, he asked Alex Madonna about the design: "Alex, you didn't have an architect here, did you? It's just as well you didn't because you couldn't have captured all the details if you had to draw them out. I don't know how you would draw these things and then accomplish them."

While in San Luis Obispo, the Petruccis did a bit of splurging by staying at the Madonna Inn, which is one of the new tourist attractions in that coastal area. According to Mrs. Petrucci, "fabulous" is the word for it.

— Penner Ewart, Dec 1963 article in Madera Tribune

In May 1966, the inn's original units were destroyed in a fire. It reopened a year later, and by the end of the decade, all of the rooms had been rebuilt in the manner for which they are known today. There are 110 rooms.

In 1975, critic Paul Goldberger wrote an article about the Madonna Inn for The New York Times, bringing it to national prominence. By 1982, the Madonna Inn was already well known, and Alex Madonna was quoted as saying, "Anybody can build one room and a thousand like it. It's more economical. Most places try to give you as little as possible. I try to give people a decent place to stay where they receive more than they are entitled to for what they're paying. I want people to come in with a smile and leave with a smile. It's fun."

Hanna-Barbera Productions sued the Madonna Inn in 1983, alleging copyright infringement over the inn's "Flintstone Room" (#139), which featured images of Fred and Wilma Flintstone and the exclamation "Yabba Dabba Doo". Room #139 is now the "Jungle Rock" junior suite. According to a 2013 interview with Clint Pearce, president of Madonna Enterprises, the "Caveman Room" (#137) was originally the "Flintstone Room".

== In popular culture ==
=== Film ===
- The "Rigoletto" segment of the film Aria (1987) was shot around the hotel.

=== Television ===
- A 1994 episode of The Simpsons entitled "Grampa vs. Sexual Inadequacy" features a hotel based on the Madonna Inn, which includes a Caveman Room.
- A season 14 episode of ABC's reality series The Bachelor, which aired on January 25, 2010, features pilot Jake Pavelka and the nine remaining women taking a road trip up the California coast, visiting the Oceano Dunes, and staying overnight at the Madonna Inn.
- In the season 5 episode of The Girls Next Door, "Happy Birthday, Anastasia", the cast visits the Madonna Inn. The episode highlights the Madonna Suite, the Old Mill room, and Alex Madonna's Gold Rush Steakhouse.

=== Music ===
- "Weird Al" Yankovic's 1978 song "Take Me Down" mentions the Madonna Inn's famous urinal (erroneously referred to as "toilets"), as well as other local landmarks such as Pismo Beach, Hearst Castle, Bubblegum Alley, and Morro Rock. Yankovic went to college at Cal Poly.
- Roxette used the inn as the setting for their 2001 video for "The Centre of the Heart", directed by Jonas Åkerlund.
- Foxes shot the video for her 2012 single "Echo" at the inn.
- Hunx's video for "Private Room" (2012) was filmed in the Vous and Floral Fantasy rooms.
- Foxygen's 2013 video for "San Francisco" was set in the Love Nest room.
- Grimes featured the inn in her 2015 double video for "Flesh Without Blood / Life in the Vivid Dream".
- Hey Violet's 2016 video for "Guys My Age" includes several of the inn's themed spaces.
- Lady Antebellum filmed a promotional video for their 2017 album Heart Break at the inn, using a different room to match each track's theme.
- Bryce Vine filmed the video for his song "Drew Barrymore" at the inn.

== Image gallery ==
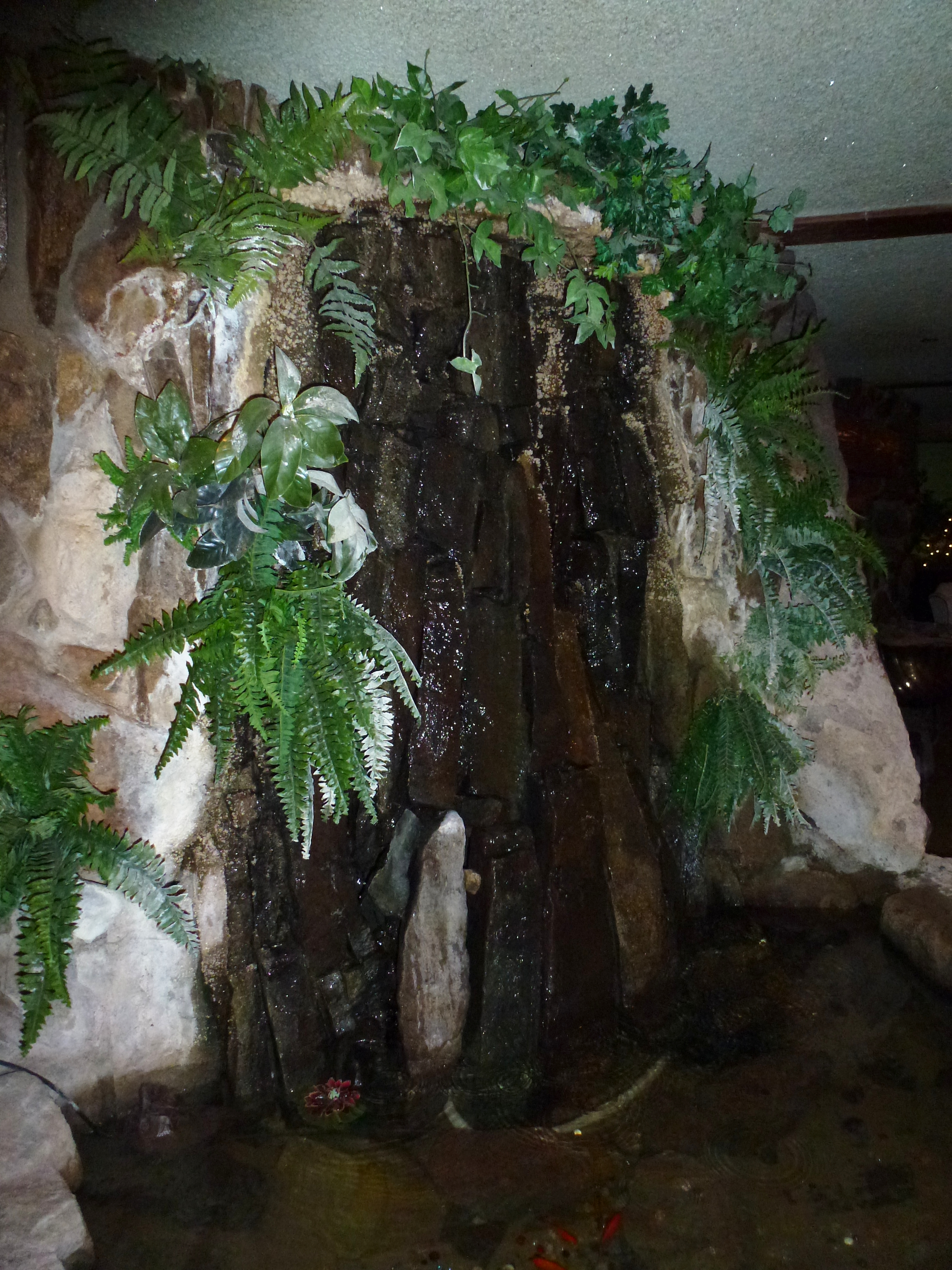
The waterfall

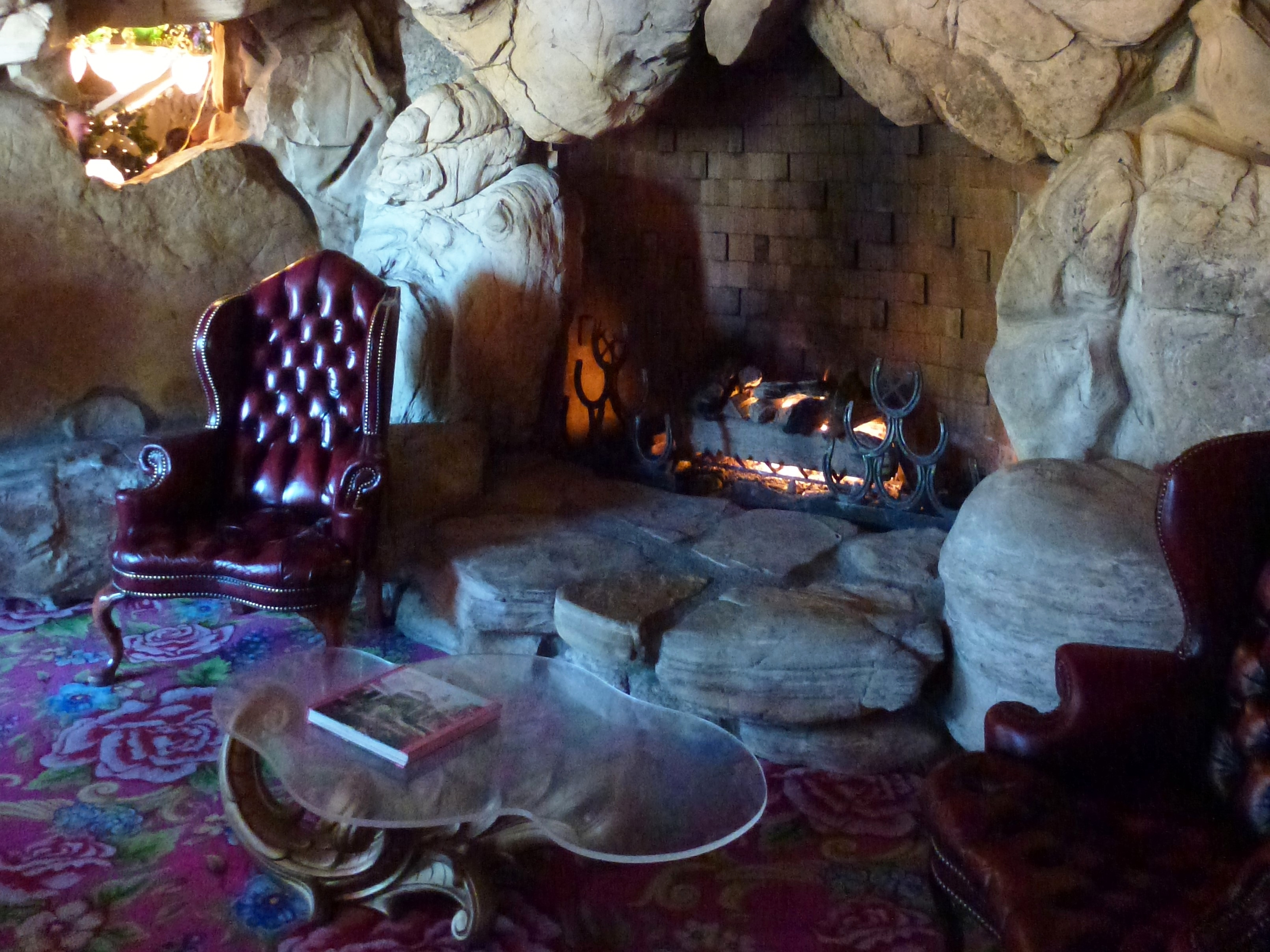
The hearth

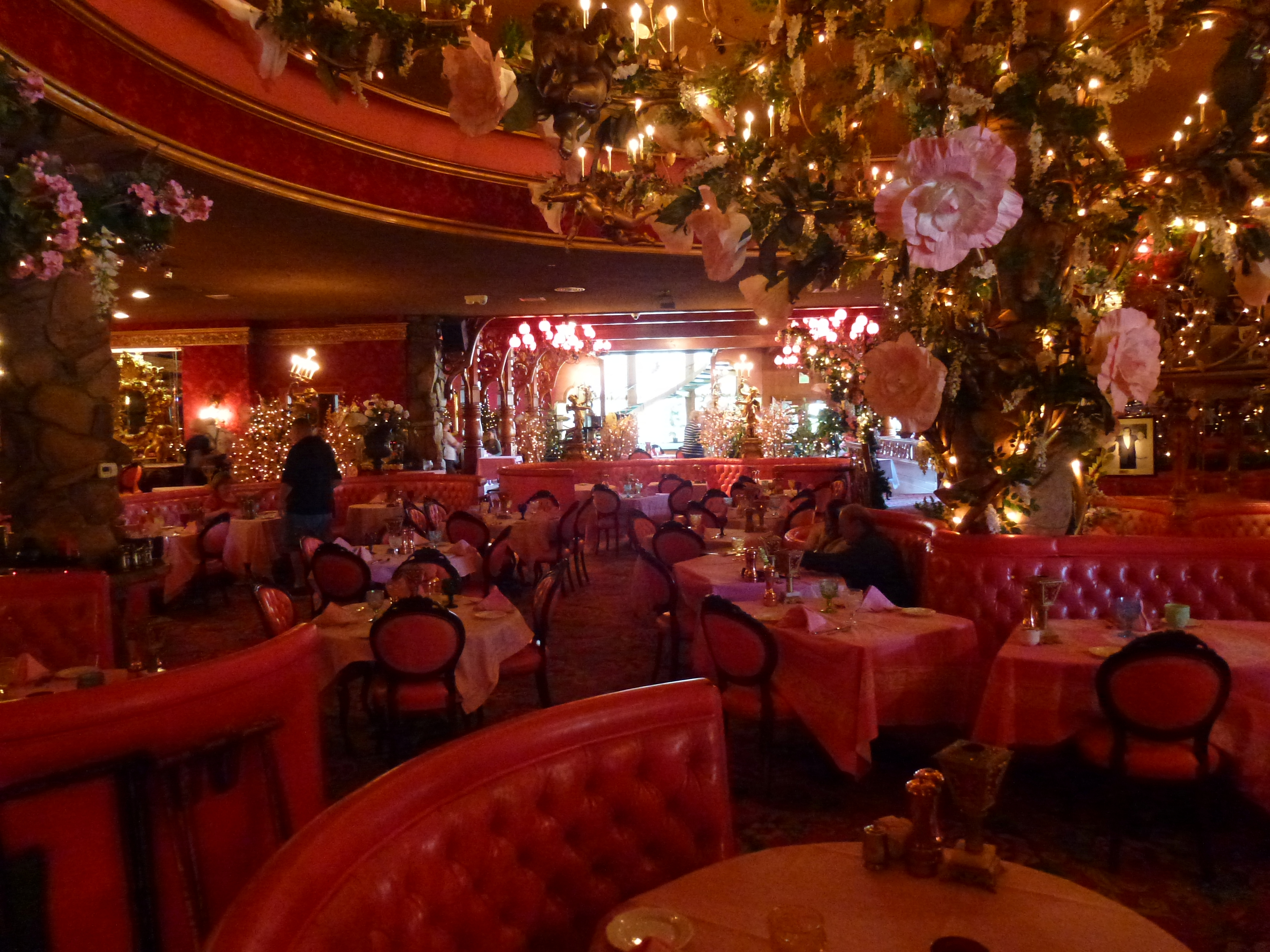
Barroom, lounge

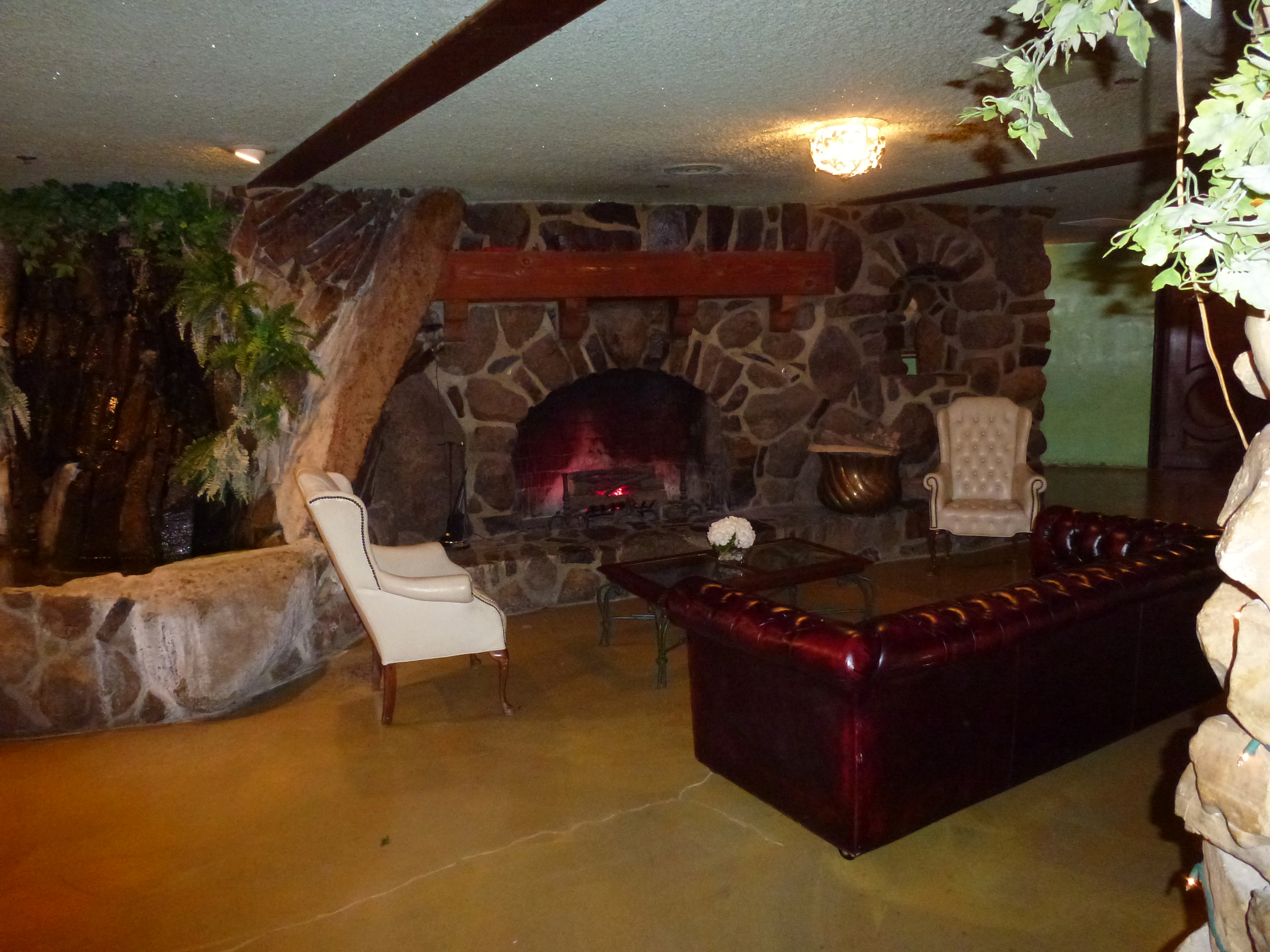
The fireplace

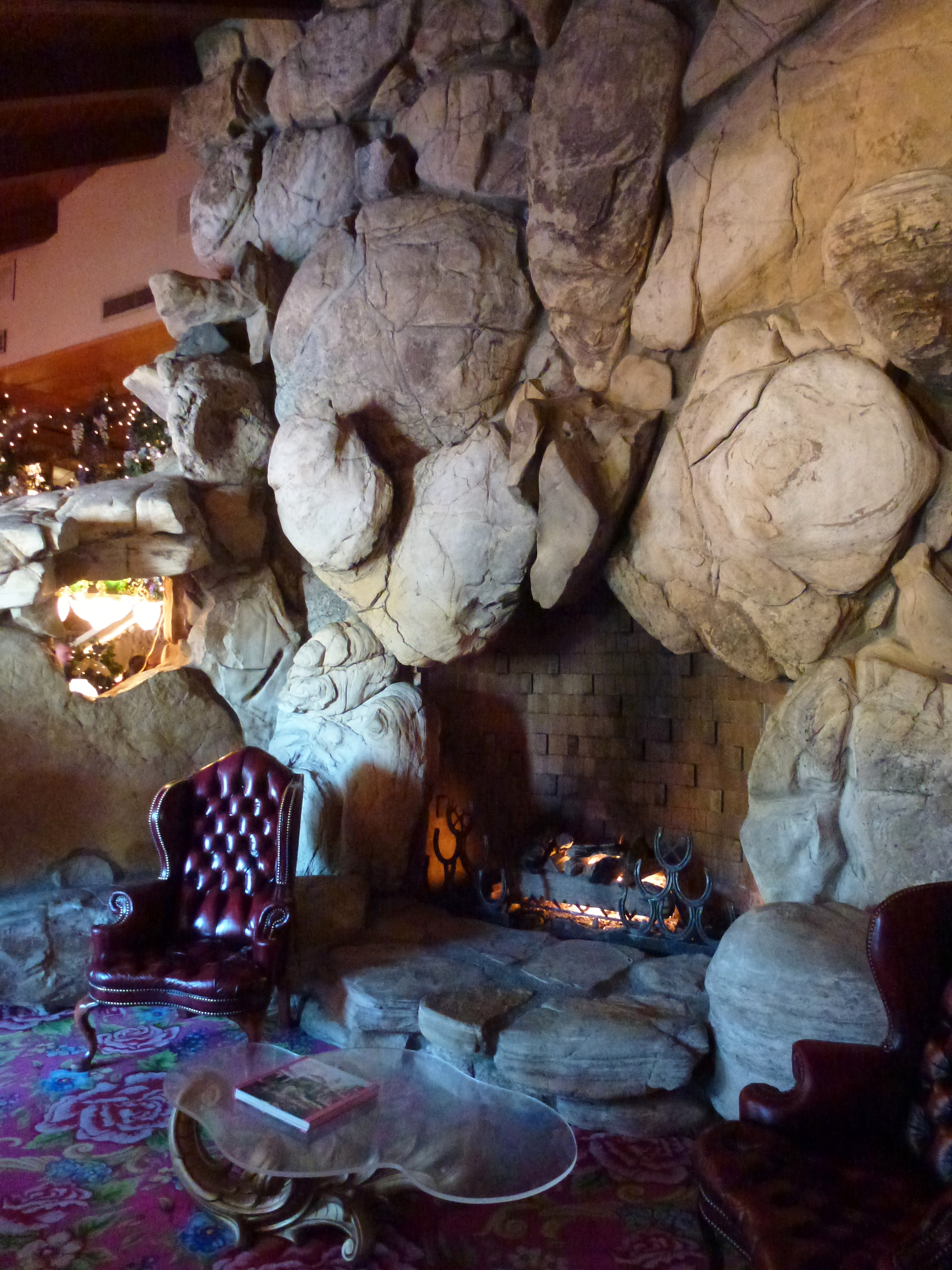
The fireplace

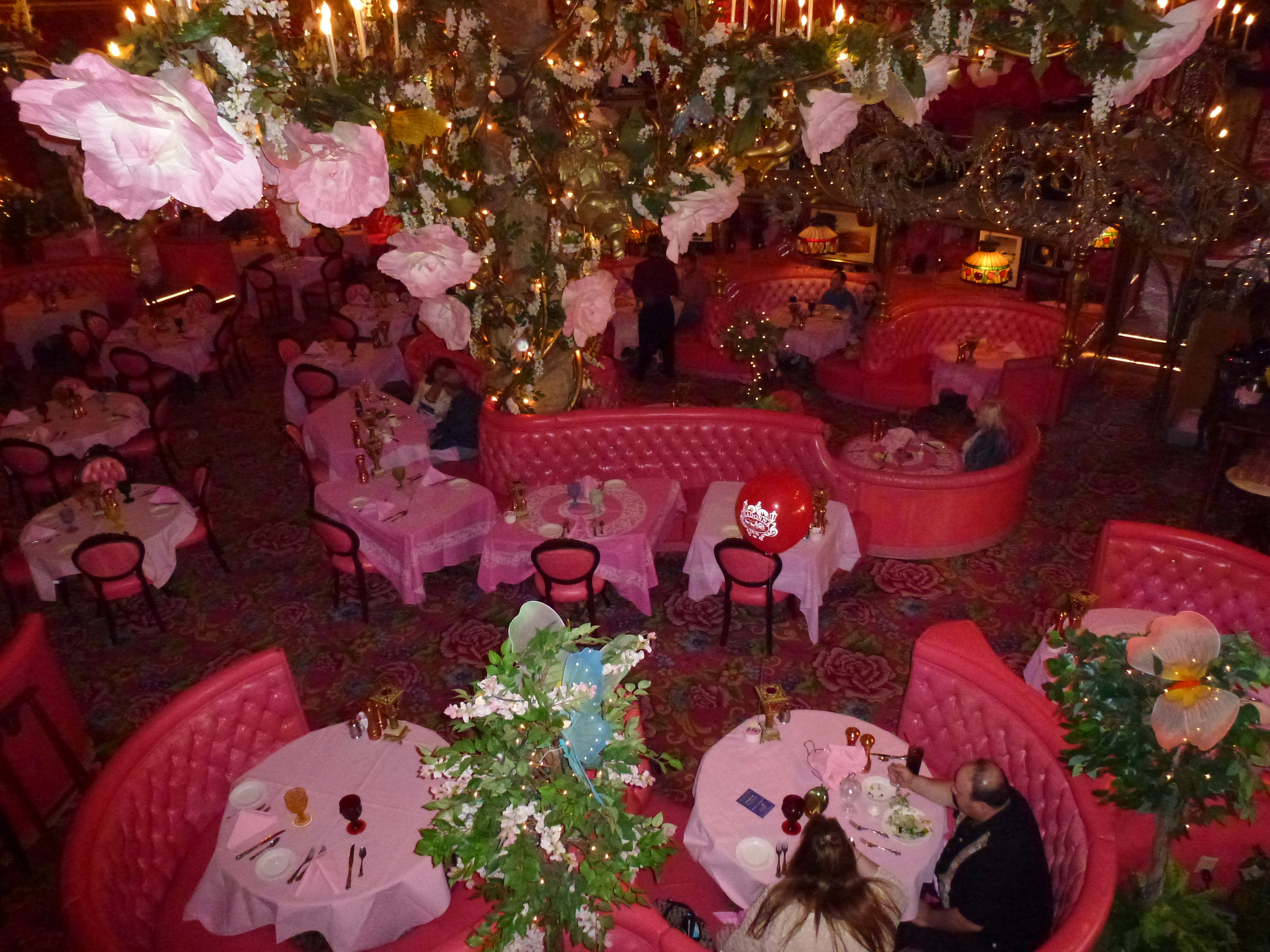
Restaurant

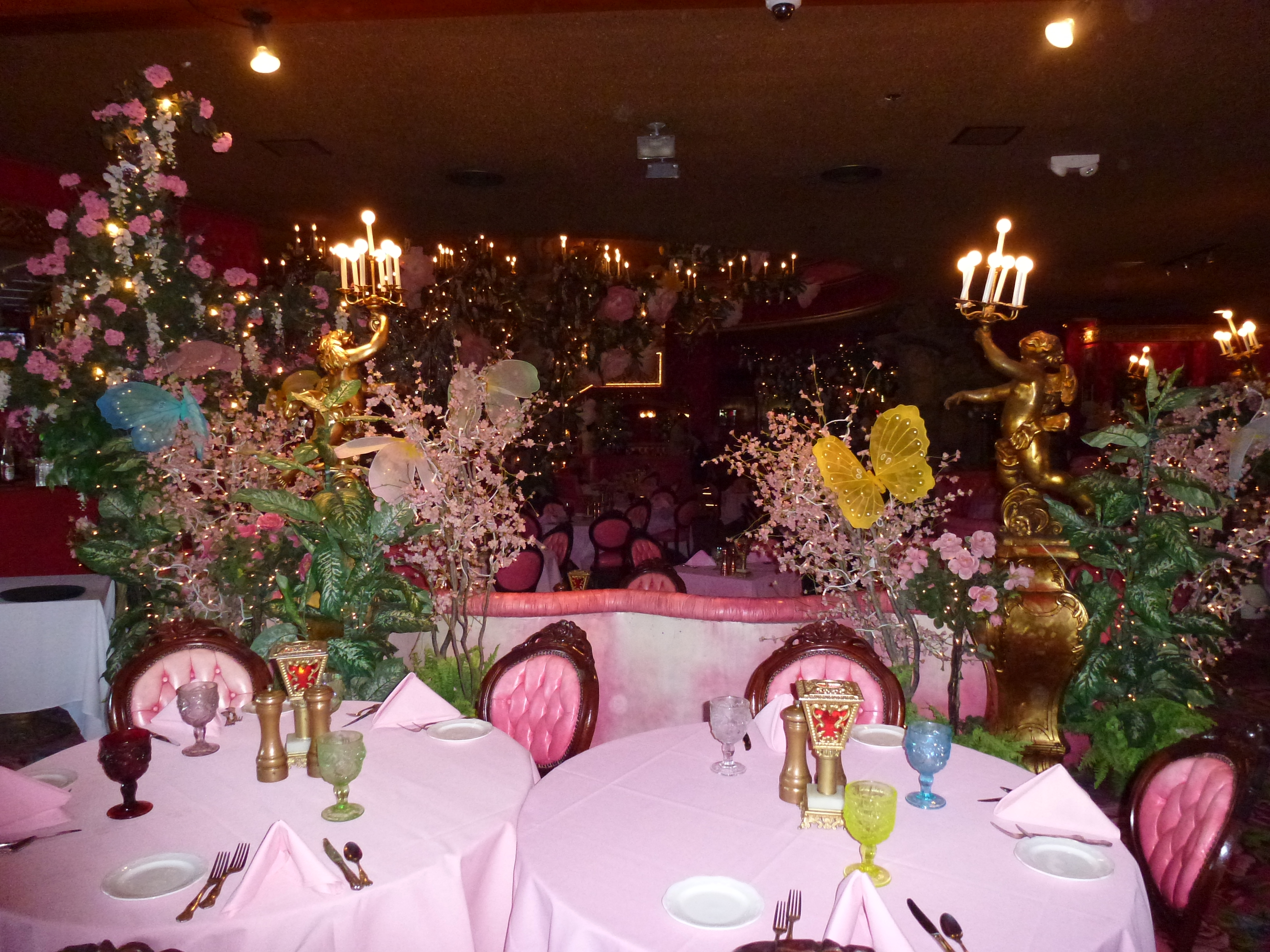
Restaurant

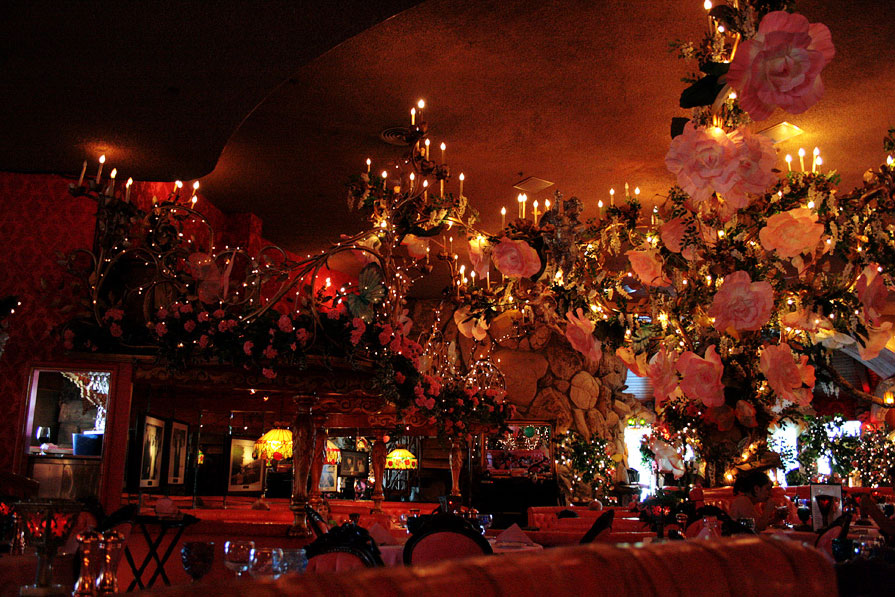
Restaurant

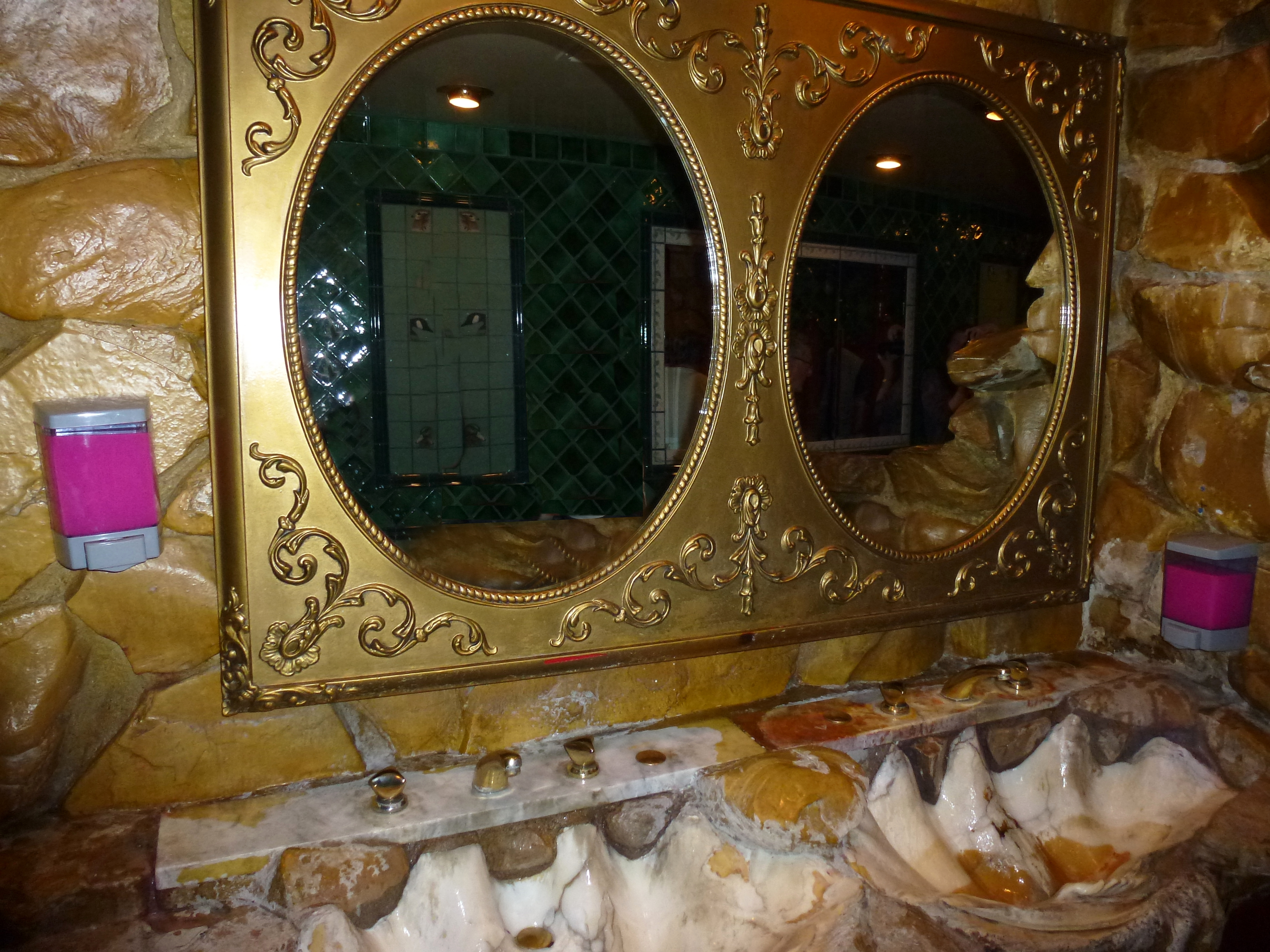
Men's Restroom

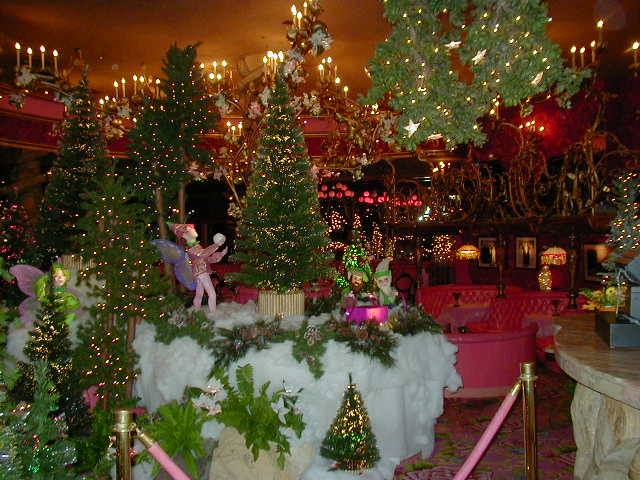
Christmas decorations

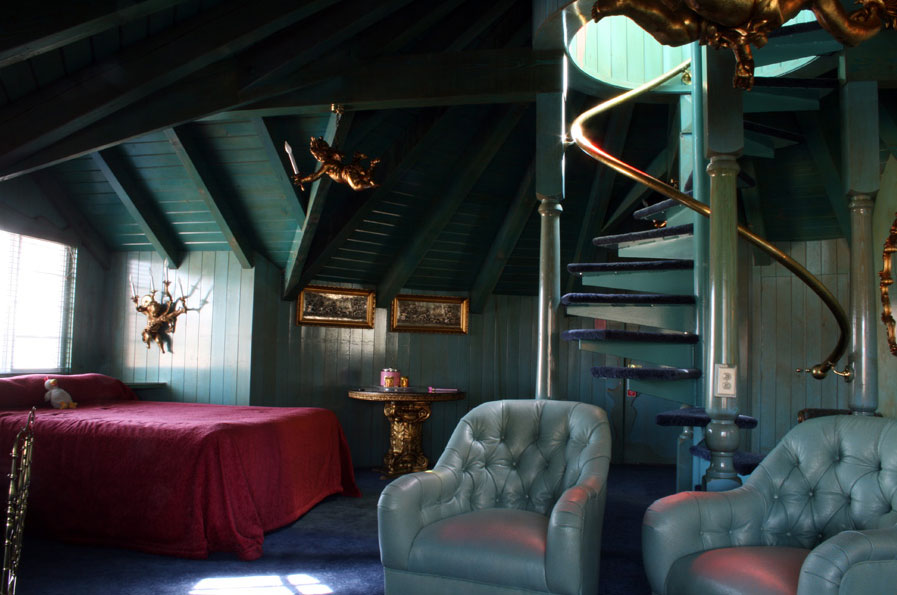
Just Heaven Hotel Room

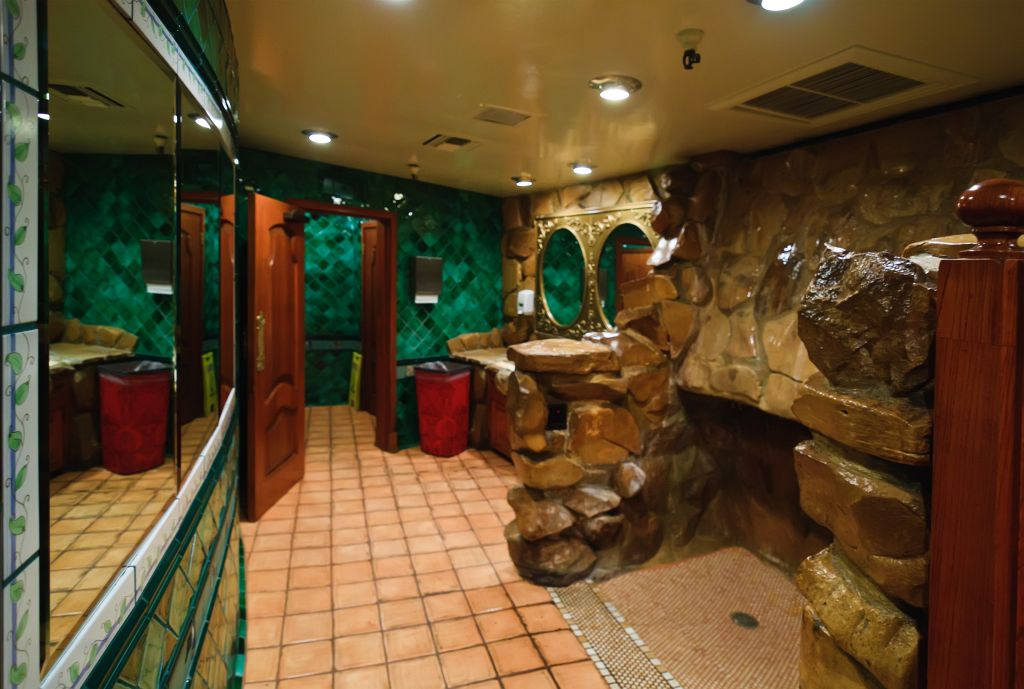
Waterfall urinal

== See also ==
- City of San Luis Obispo Historic Resources
- List of motels
- Motel Inn, San Luis Obispo
