= Ada E. North =

First female State Librarian of Iowa

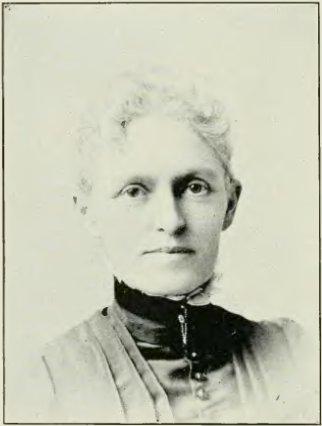
- Born: November 19, 1840; Alexander
- Died: January 9, 1899 (aged 58); Des Moines
- Occupation: Librarian

Ada E. North (November 19, 1840 – January 9, 1899) was an American librarian. North served as the Iowa State Librarian from 1871 to 1878, becoming one of the first women to hold a state office in the United States. She later worked as the first full-time librarian at the University of Iowa and was one of the cofounders of the Iowa Library Association.

== Life and library work ==
Ada E. Miles was born on November 19, 1840, in Alexander, New York. She was the daughter of Milo N. Miles, a Congregational minister.

She married George J. North, military secretary to Governor William M. Stone, in 1865; he died in 1870. To support her two children, North found a position doing temporary clerical work in the Iowa legislature, becoming one of the first women employed as a clerk in the State House. In 1871, State Librarian John C. Merrill died, and Governor Samuel Merrill appointed North as the new Librarian. This appointment made her the first woman to hold a state office in Iowa and one of the first in the United States. Recognizing that her work was being scrutinized because of her gender, North approached her work with enthusiasm. At her suggestion, a bill was prepared and passed that provided for a board of trustees to oversee the library, consisting of multiple state officials, and providing the appointed librarian a salary of $1,200 a year.

As State Librarian North offered sessions on the use of the library's reference works and other resources. In 1872 she created the library's first printed catalog of its 14,500 volume collection. During her time in this role, she systematized and enlarged the collections of the State Library.

In 1878 she became the city librarian for Des Moines.

The following year, the Board of Regents of the State University of Iowa appointed North the librarian, making her the first full-time librarian at the university. She toured the Eastern United States, learning about new advances in librarianship, and implemented significant changes such as introducing a card catalog and reclassifying the 27,000 volumes of the library using the Dewey Decimal Classification. North encouraged greater student use by extending operating hours, opening the stacks to students, and instituting lending procedures. She held the position of university librarian for thirteen years, but in 1892 she was replaced by a political appointee, Joseph W. Rich. The editors of Library Journal protested her dismissal, saying she was very popular with students, although ill health may also have played a factor.

== Service to librarianship and legacy ==
North was one of five library advocates to call a meeting in 1890 in Des Moines to create the Iowa Library Society; in 1896 the organization was renamed the Iowa Library Association. She was instrumental in promoting a training program for working librarians, suggesting that an organization "take up the work and start a training class in connection with its own library". She wrote an article for Library Journal in 1891 reporting on the efforts of Iowa librarians, urging:

What is wanted now is a general waking up to the progress of library movement around us, and to the superlative importance of the library as a factor in education. Once having started the demand for larger libraries and improved accommodations, we believe that the necessary money will be forthcoming from both public and private funds, until Iowa... shall have a library and reading-room in every town and village.

From the end of her work at the university in 1892 to her death, she suffered from ill health. North died on January 9, 1899, in Des Moines, Iowa. After her death, Johnson Brigham, the State Librarian from 1898 to 1936, discussed the significance of her achievements:

Mrs. North was not content with faithful and efficient service in the library. She was quick to grasp the modern idea of library service. To her mind libraries maintained by the people were for the people and not for a privileged few. [...] For twenty-one years, from 1871-1892, this pioneer librarian of Iowa dreamed, planned and worked for the inauguration of the library movement now (1903) grandly sweeping over our State.
