= Isles =

Isles may refer to:

- Island

== Places ==
- British Isles, often referred to as "the Isles"
- Kingdom of the Isles, a medieval realm comprising the Hebrides, the islands of the Firth of Clyde, and the Isle of Man

== People ==
- Carlin Isles (born 1989), American rugby sevens player

== Arts, entertainment, and media ==
- Isles (Wild Belle album), debut studio album by duo Wild Belle
- Isles (Bicep album), second studio album by duo Bicep
- Isles FM, a local radio station operating from Stornoway in the Outer Hebrides, Scotland

== Other uses ==
- British Isles naming dispute
- Isles class trawler, a class of naval trawler used by the Royal Navy, Royal Canadian Navy, and Royal New Zealand Navy
- ISLES project, a study on renewable energy potential off the coasts of western Scotland and Ireland

== See also ==
- Isle (disambiguation)
- New York Islanders, a professional ice hockey team that is part of the National Hockey League (NHL)
