= Islay (disambiguation) =

Islay is an island in the Inner Hebrides, Scotland.

Islay may also refer to

== Places ==
- Islay Airport, airport on Islay
- Islay Island (Antarctica)
- Islay Hill, USA
- Islay Province, Peru
  - Islay District, Peru
- Islay, Alberta, a hamlet in Alberta, Canada
- Islay, Ontario, Canada
- Sound of Islay, strait between Islay and Jura

== People ==
- Islay Burns, Scottish theologian, 1817–1872
- Lord of Islay, chief of Clan Donald of Islay

== Ships ==
- BAP Islay (SS-35), Peruvian submarine
- HMT Islay, World War II British ship
- MV Isle of Islay, CalMac ferry under construction in 2023

== Other ==
- Battle of Islay, battle of 1838 between Chile and Peru-Bolivia
- Islay Charter, a charter of 1408
- Islay LIMPET, the world's first commercial wave power device
- Islay (novel), a novel by Douglas Bullard
- Islay whisky, a range of alcoholic beverages
- Islay, a shrub, Prunus ilicifolia
