= First Presbyterian Church (San Luis Obispo, California) =

Coordinates: 35.2802°N 120.6609°W

- First Presbyterian Church
- Location: 981 Marsh St. San Luis Obispo, CA 93401
- Country: United States
- Denomination: Presbyterian (PCUSA)
- Website: http://www.fpcslo.org/

History
- Founded: 1875
- Founder: McDowell Reid Venable

Architecture
- Architect: Thornton Fitzhugh (1904) William Orr (1928) Curtis Illingsworth (1987)
- Style: English Arts & Crafts (1904) Gothic Revival (1928)
- Years built: 1904-1905

The First Presbyterian Church in downtown San Luis Obispo, California is located at 981 Marsh Street on the corner of Marsh and Morro Streets. It holds Sunday services and also midweek gatherings.

The mission of First Presbyterian Church is to glorify Jesus Christ and to be instruments of God's healing, reconciling, life-giving presence in the world.

== Building History ==
First Presbyterian Church is a historic Presbyterian church founded by Civil War veteran and San Luis Obispo county judge, McDowell Reid Venable in 1875 with eleven charter members. It was the third Protestant church founded in San Luis Obispo. Prior to the erection of its current building, property was purchased at the corner of Marsh and Morro Streets and a small, wood church building was constructed. In 1884, this small church was replaced by a slightly larger Victorian Stick-Eastlake church that seated nearly 200 people. In 1904, this building was relocated to the lot next door where it was used by the congregation and the community for two more decades. The cornerstone for the church's present building was laid in 1904. Construction was completed in 1905 using granite quarried from nearby Bishop Peak in the English Arts and Crafts style.

The Educational Unit (the Hart Building) was constructed and dedicated in February 1929. A local journal observed that it was “…the first building, other than a church, to be devoted exclusively to religious education in San Luis Obispo…” The A. G. Wilson Fellowship Hall was built in 1987 and has been the center of church fellowship activities and it is also used for many community events. In 2001 the stone sanctuary was earthquake retrofitted.

== Leadership ==
The church belongs to the Santa Barbara Presbytery within the Synod of Southern California. First Presbyterian Church is currently under the leadership of Pastor John A. D'Elia, PhD. The Youth and Children Ministries, as well as Adult Education, are overseen by Jenifer Rabenaldt. Front Porch, the college ministry, is directed by Joel Drenckpohl.

== Relationship to California Polytechnic State University ==
Front Porch, (Presbyterians of Reasoned Christian Hope) is a ministry of the Santa Barbara Presbytery (PCUSA) in partnership with FPCSLO. Front Porch is directed by Joel Drenckpohl. While many participants are Presbyterians, many are not.

=== Housing Project ===
In the Spring of 2008, the City of San Luis Obispo approved the construction of a Housing Project to supplement the ministry of Front Porch. The project is to be built on the site of the old Front Porch building near the dead-end of Foothill Blvd. near the Cal Poly campus. This project includes approximately 40 rooms, a ministry hall, a cafe, a kitchen, and a residence for the director and her/his family. The project was scheduled to be completed in mid-2010.

== See also ==
- List of Presbyterian churches
- City of San Luis Obispo Historic Resources
