= Ile District =

Ile District may refer to:

- Ile District, Kazakhstan
- Ile District, Mozambique
