= Ile =

Ile or ILE may refer to:

== Ile ==
- Ile, a Puerto Rican singer
- Ile District (disambiguation), multiple places
- Ilé-Ifẹ̀, an ancient Yoruba city in south-western Nigeria
- Interlingue (ISO 639:ile), a planned language
- Isoleucine, an amino acid abbreviated as Ile or I
- Another name for Ilargi, the moon in Basque mythology
- Historical spelling of Islay, Scottish island and girls' name
- Another name for the Ili River in eastern Kazakhstan
- Ile, a gender-neutral pronoun in Portuguese
- iLe, a Puerto Rican singer

== ILE ==
- Institution of Lighting Engineers, (ILE) UK and Ireland's largest professional lighting association
- Ivor Lewis Esophagectomy, a surgical procedure. See Esophagectomy.
- Institución Libre de Enseñanza, a Spanish education organization associated with Residencia de Estudiantes
- Intuitive Logical Extrovert, a Socionics term
- Skylark Field, Killeen, Texas, IATA airport code
- Indefinite life extension, the hypothetical elimination of aging via medicine
- Integrated Language Environment, a programming language model developed by IBM for OS/400 (now known as IBM i)
- Intermediate Level Education, at United States Army Command and General Staff College
