= Iowa Library Association =

Professional association for librarians in Iowa

- Nickname: ILA
- Formation: September 2, 1890; 136 years ago
- Founded at: Des Moines, Iowa
- Location: 400 E Court Ave., Ste 126, Des Moines, Iowa 50309
- President: Brittany Jacobs (2026)
- Parent organization: American Library Association
- Website: www.iowalibraryassociation.org

The Iowa Library Association (1890) is a professional organization for Iowa's librarians and library workers. It is headquartered in Des Moines, Iowa. It was founded on September 2, 1890, in Des Moines, Iowa at the State Library in the Iowa State Capitol, by Ada E. North, Librarian at the State University of Iowa in Iowa City; State Librarian Mary Miller, T.S. Parvin of the Iowa Masonic Library, Clara M. Smith of the Burlington Public Library, and Clara C. Dwight of the Dubuque Y.M. Library. It is the second oldest state library association in the country.

Mary H. Miller was elected as the first President by the five organizers and twelve other librarians. The fledgling organization borrowed its bylaws from the New York Library Association, which was founded earlier that same year. The original bylaws established dues of one dollar per year and required that the association hold an annual meeting during the week of the Iowa State Fair. More recently, Iowa State Fairs have been scheduled in August but the annual meetings continue to be hosted in October, which is closer to the date when the original state fairs were held.

The Association now has over 1600 members from over 500 public, academic, and special libraries all over the state.

== See also ==
- List of libraries in the United States
