= Ila birthmark =

Ila (pr. E-la) is a birthmark found amongst Samoan infants, up until the last seventy years. It was described by Augustin Kraemer as being circular in shape, about 10 cm across, and lying just above the buttocks of infants up to the age of six months. It has a faint dark blue color.

The birthmark is a Mongolian spot and is apparently homozygous recessive. Nearly all Samoan infants were born with this mark, but any ancestry outside of Samoa, however slight, results in the infant not showing the mark. The birthmark is now very rare in Samoa, and can only be found occasionally on remote islands to the west.
