= Islay Hill =

Volcanic cone in San Luis Obispo County, California

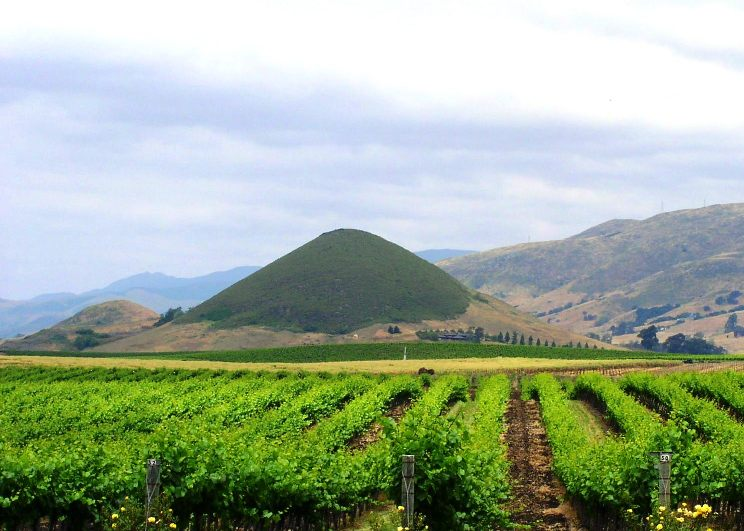
- Viewed from the south. Righetti Hill (formerly Mine Hill), a minor peak, is seen to the left.

Highest point
- Elevation: 783+ ft (239+ m) NAVD 88
- Coordinates: 35°14′44″N 120°37′21″W

Geography
- Location: San Luis Obispo County, California, U.S.
- Parent range: Santa Lucia Range
- Topo map: Arroyo Grande NE

Geology
- Rock age: 20 million years
- Mountain type: Volcanic plug

Islay Hill is a volcanic cone, and is the southernmost of the nine volcanic mountains and hills that make up the Nine Sisters, located in the San Luis Obispo County of central California.

This chain of extinct, but possibly dormant volcanoes, the eight others volcanic plugs, stretches from Morro Bay southeast to Islay Hill, which is on the southeast side of San Luis Obispo (city).
