= Nine Sisters =

Volcanic mountains and hills in California, United States

- Los Morros, Seven Sisters
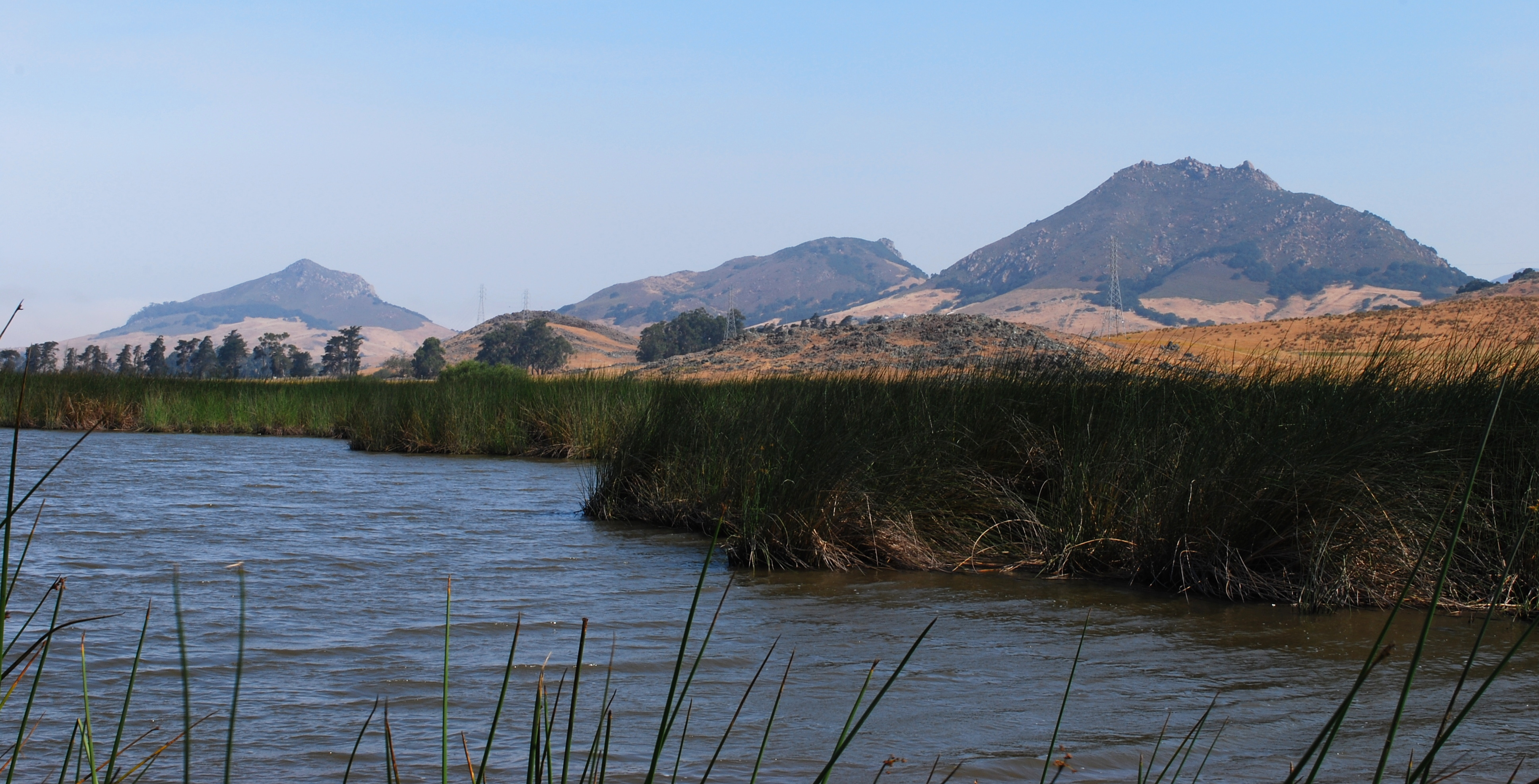
- Cerro Romauldo, Chumash Peak, and Bishop Peak as viewed from Laguna Lake

Highest point
- Peak: Bishop Peak
- Elevation: 475 m (1,558 ft)
- Coordinates: 35°18′09″N 120°41′51″W

Dimensions
- Length: 16.6 mi (26.7 km) WNW–ESE
- Width: 3.9 mi (6.3 km)

Geography
- Country: United States
- State: California

Geology
- Rock age: 20–25 mya (Late Oligocene to Early Miocene)
- Rock type: Volcanic plugs

The Nine Sisters or the Morros or Seven Sisters are a chain of twenty-three, although typically only nine or seven are included, volcanic mountains and hills in western San Luis Obispo County on the Central Coast of California. They run between Morro Bay and San Luis Obispo.

== Geography ==
The peaks were created more than 20 million years ago during the Miocene Epoch of the Neogene Period, as volcanic plugs of magma which welled up and solidified inside softer rock which has since eroded away. Every plug, with the exception of just two, formed in a nearly straight line.

Two of the plugs are in Morro Bay State Park. The highest is Bishop Peak at 1,559 feet (475 m).

=== Peaks ===
The peaks in order from Morro Bay to San Luis Obispo, including their height, a sortable table.

Name	Height ft (m)
Morro Rock	576 (176)
Black Hill	665 (203)
Cerro Cabrillo	911 (278)
Hollister Peak	1,404 (428)
Cerro Romauldo	1,306 (398)
Chumash Peak	1,257 (383)
Bishop Peak	1,559 (475)
Cerro San Luis Obispo	1,292 (394)
Islay Hill	775 (236)

== Geology ==
The Nine Sisters are a chain of volcanic plugs composed predominantly of dacite. About 20 to 25 million years ago, magma welled up underneath a layer of softer rock and solidified. The softer overlying rock has since eroded away, leaving a distinct rugged shape.

== Features ==
The Nine Sisters, being less accessible to human intrusions, support a wide variety of Coastal sage scrub and California oak woodlands flora, and of birds and other fauna.

Their volcanic origin makes them of significant geological interest. They are popular with photographers and rock climbers.

=== Panorama ===
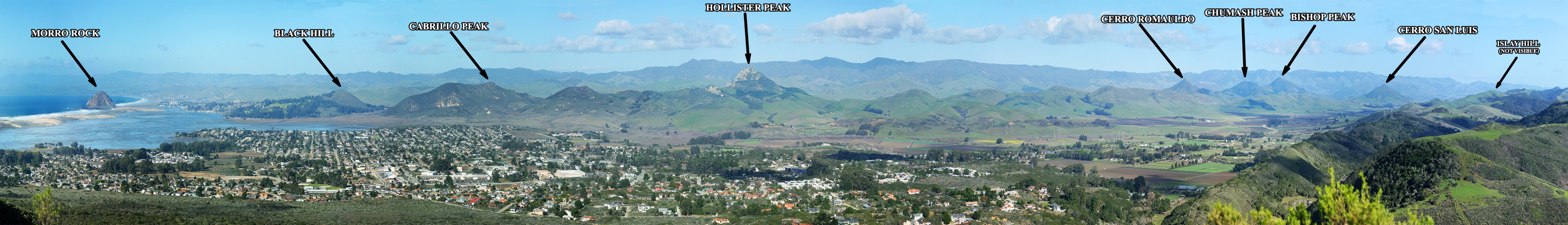
Panorama taken from Montaña de Oro State Park.
