= Isle =

An isle is an island, land surrounded by water. The term is very common in British English. However, there is no clear agreement on what makes an island an isle or its difference, so they are considered synonyms.

Isle may refer to:

== Geography ==
- Isle (river), a river in France
- Isle, Haute-Vienne, a commune of the Haute-Vienne département in France
- Isle, Minnesota, a small city in the United States
- River Isle, a river in England

== Arts, entertainment, and media ==
- Interdisciplinary Studies in Literature and Environment (or ISLE), a journal published by Oxford University Press for the Association for the Study of Literature and Environment
- The Isle, 2017 film with Conleth Hill
- The Isle, a 2000 South Korean film directed by Kim Ki-duk
- Isle (album)

== Other uses ==
- International Society for the Linguistics of English (ISLE), a learned society of linguists

== See also ==
- Aisle, a space for walking, e.g., in a church, classroom, theatre, supermarket, etc.
- Isles (disambiguation)
