= Bishop Peak (California) =

Volcanic plug in San Luis Obispo, California, United States

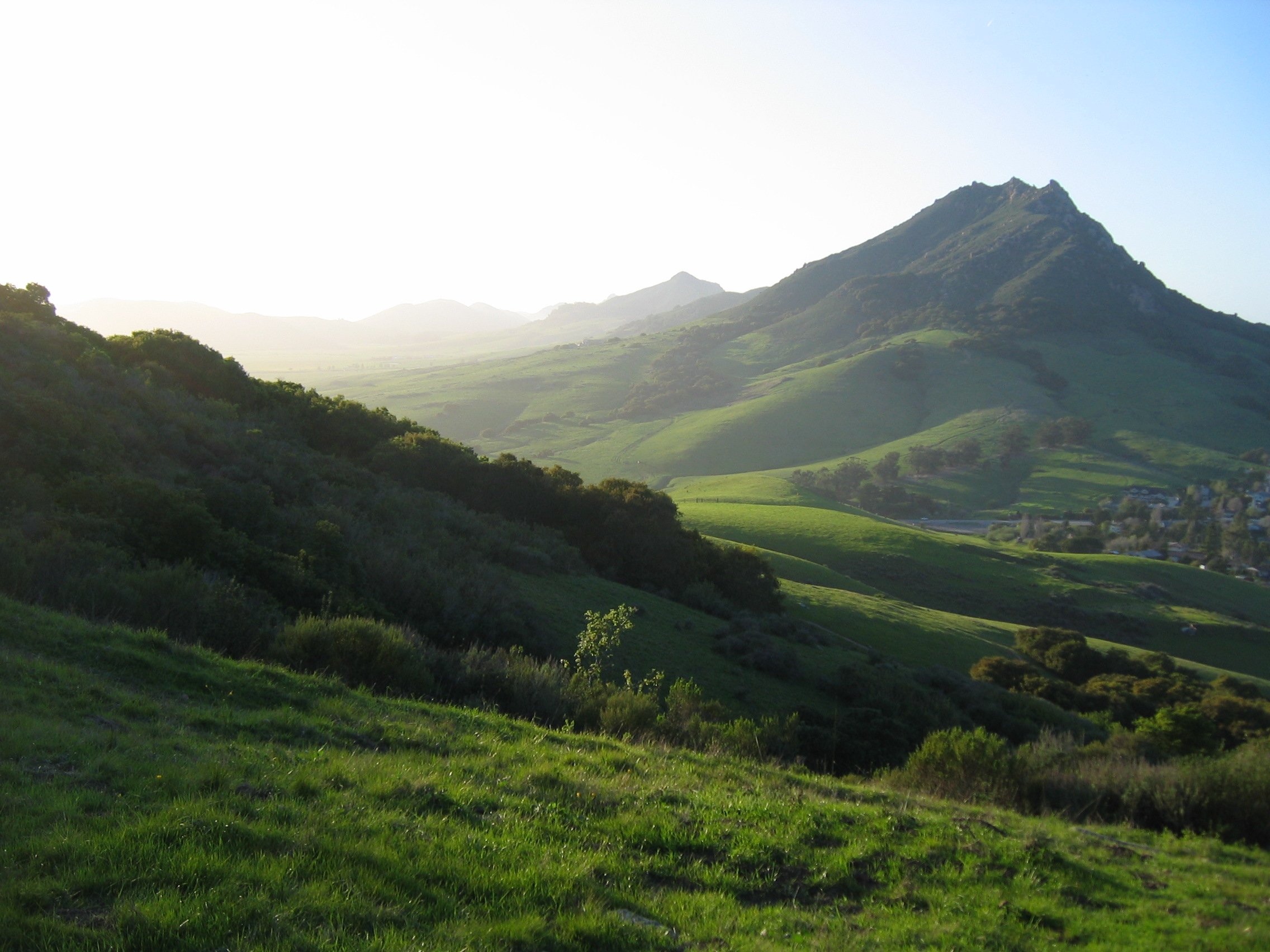
- Bishop Peak from Cerro San Luis

Highest point
- Elevation: 1,549 ft (472 m) NAVD 88
- Prominence: 1,086 ft (331 m)
- Listing: Sierra Club Lower Peaks Committee
- Coordinates: 35°18′09″N 120°41′51″W

Geography
- Location: San Luis Obispo County, California, U.S.
- Parent range: Santa Lucia Range
- Topo map: San Luis Obispo

Geology
- Rock age: 20 million years
- Mountain type: Volcanic plug

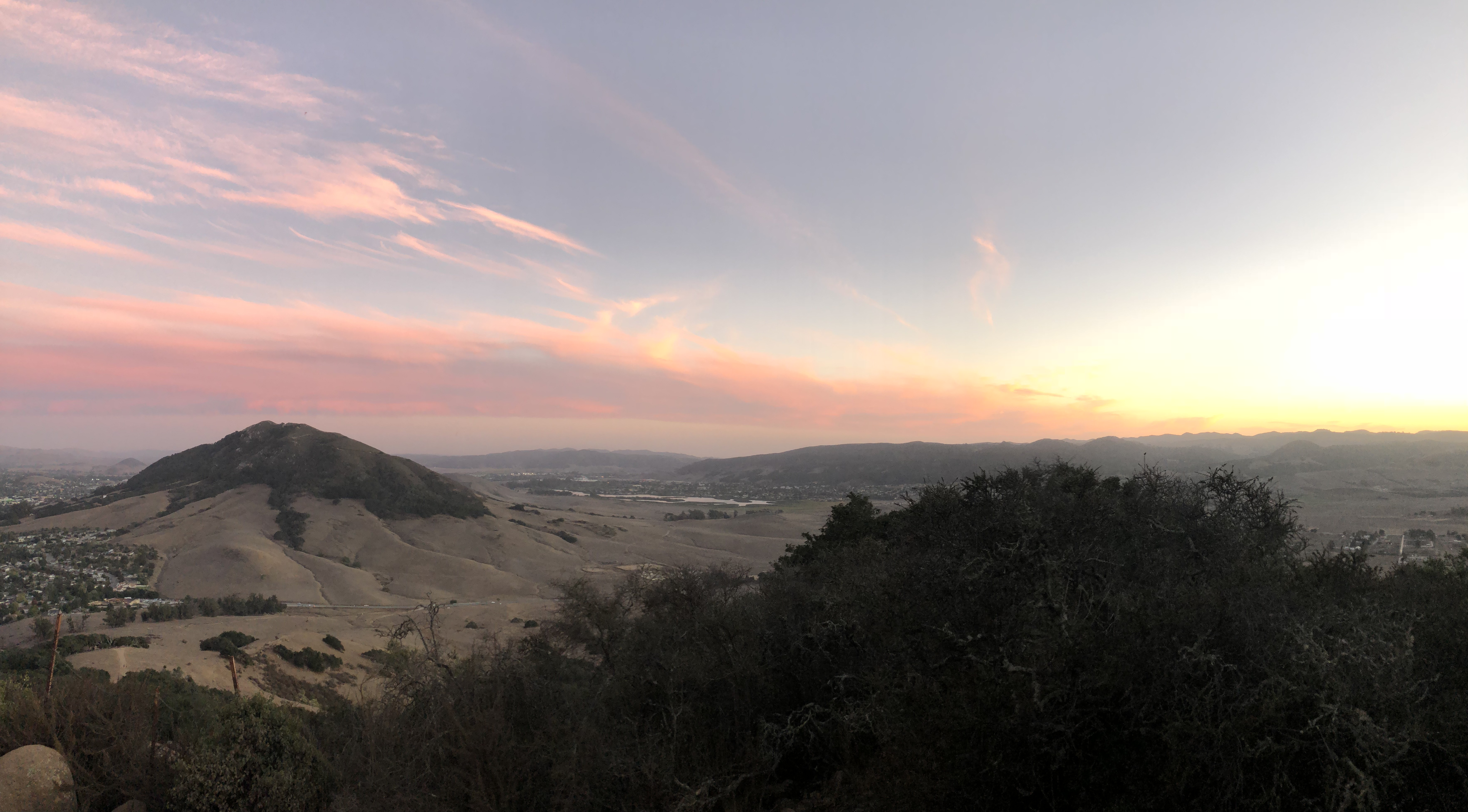
View from Bishop Peak at sunset

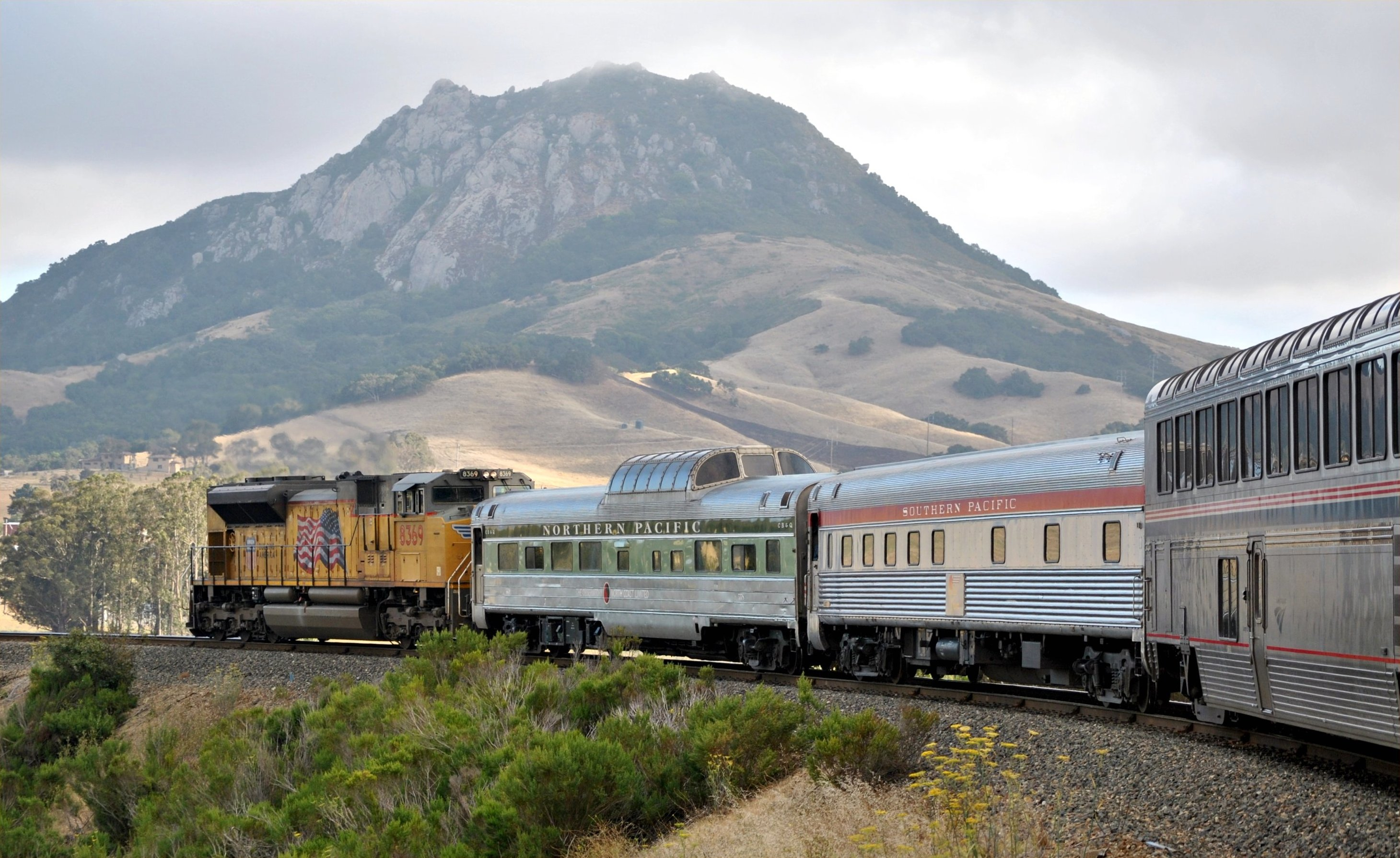
Bishop Peak from the Coast Starlight

Bishop Peak is a 1,546-foot (471 m) volcanic plug in San Luis Obispo, California. It is the tallest of the Morros or "Nine Sisters", a chain of similar peaks stretching to Morro Bay. Often said to take its name from its resemblance to a bishop's miter, it is named in homage to the town's name (San Luis Obispo). "Obispo" is the Spanish word for Bishop.

== Geology ==
Like the other Morros, Bishop Peak is primarily composed of dacite. About 20 to 25 million years ago, magma welled up underneath a layer of softer rock and solidified. The softer overlying rock has since eroded away, leaving a distinct rugged shape.

== Wildlife ==
Bishop Peak's thin, rocky soil supports many plants that are not common in the surrounding area. Vegetation includes an Oak woodland, sage scrub and chaparral.

Woodland areas are composed of species like coast live oak and California bay trees, as well as poison oak and California blackberry. Scrub areas support many aromatic varieties of sagebrush, coyote bush, and monkeyflower.

Bird life includes large numbers of jays and other passerine birds, as well as birds of prey including golden eagles, bald eagles, owls and vultures. Mammals include deer, raccoons and opossums as well as predators like foxes, coyotes, bobcats and mountain lion.

== Land use ==
Quarrying has taken place as far back as 1890. Granite for the nearby city of San Luis Obispo can be found along curbs in most of the city's older neighborhoods and on several extant structures, most notably, First Presbyterian Church.

Bishop Peak Natural Reserve includes 350 acres (1.4 km^{2}) of land purchased or donated since 1977.

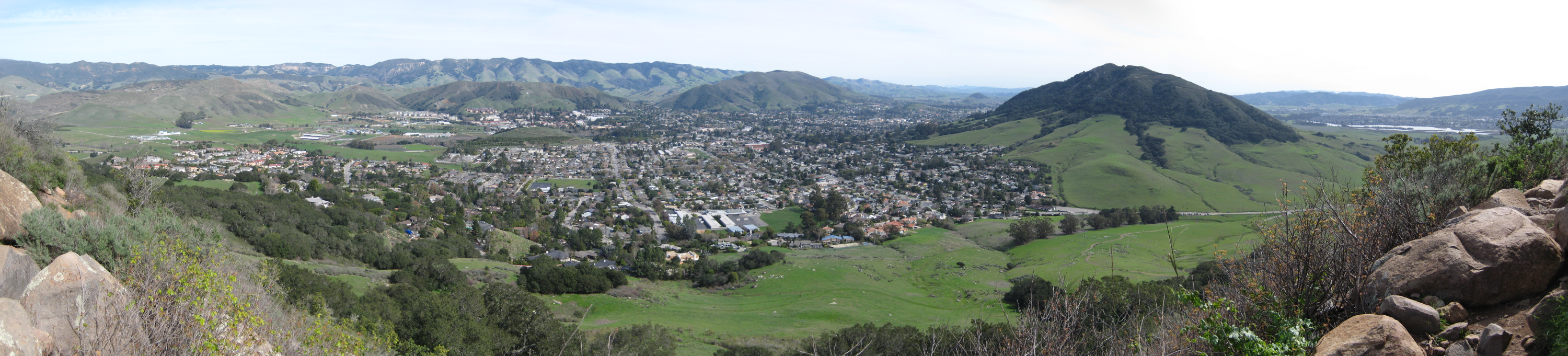
San Luis Obispo panorama from halfway up Bishop Peak during early April

== Gallery ==
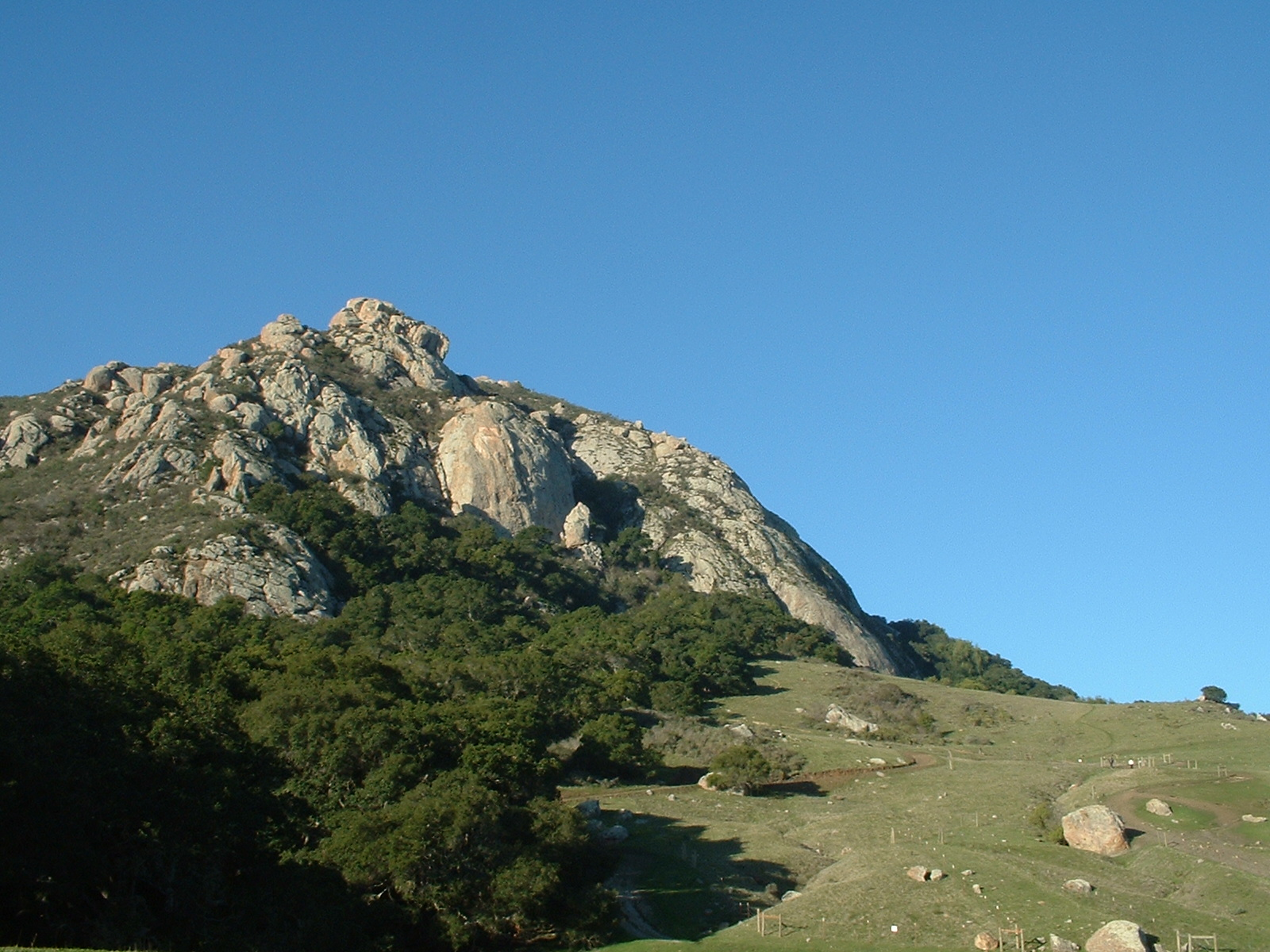
A closer view of Bishop Peak and its foothills

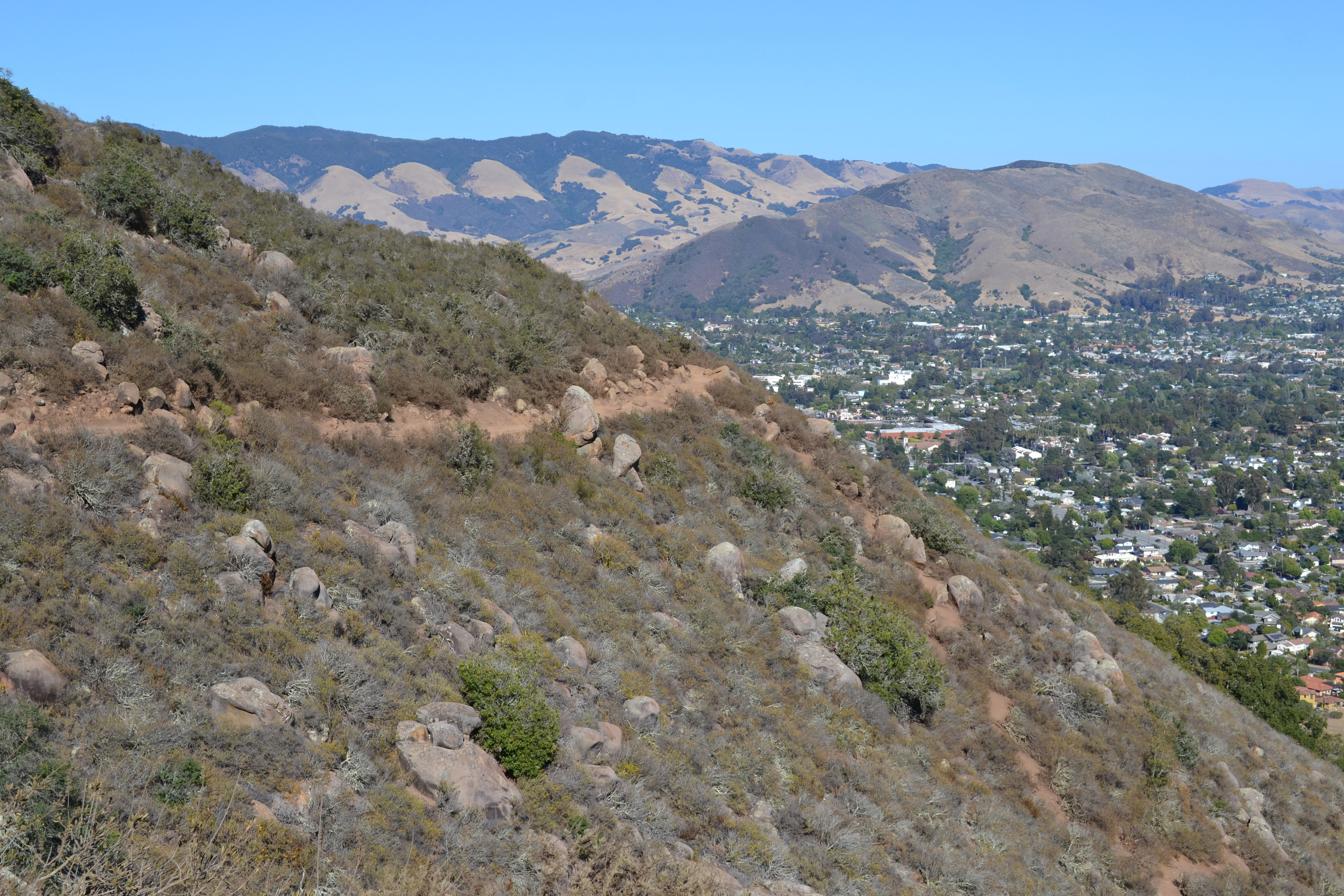
A portion of the Bishop Peak trail

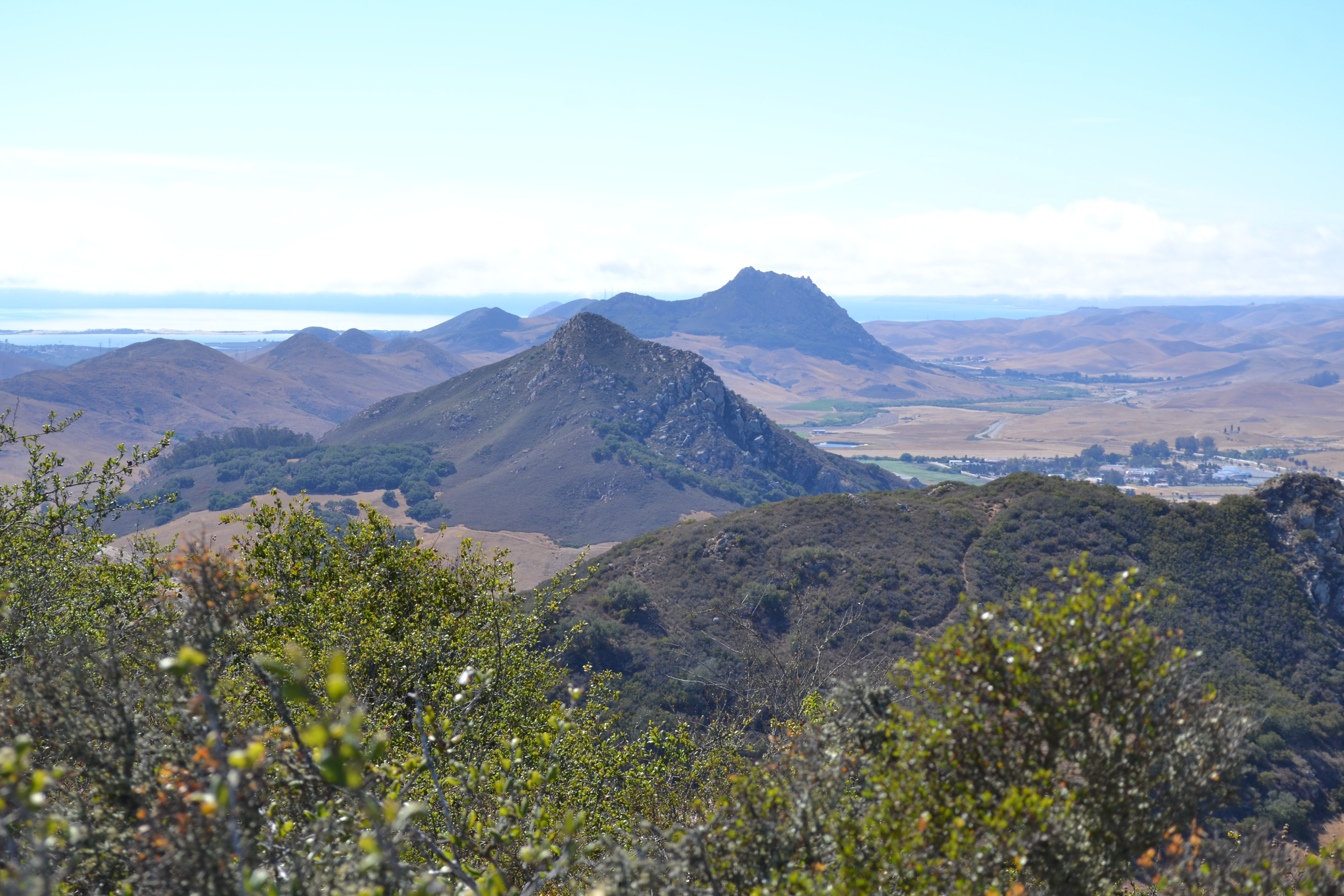
A view of several of the Nine Sisters towards Morro Rock from Bishop Peak

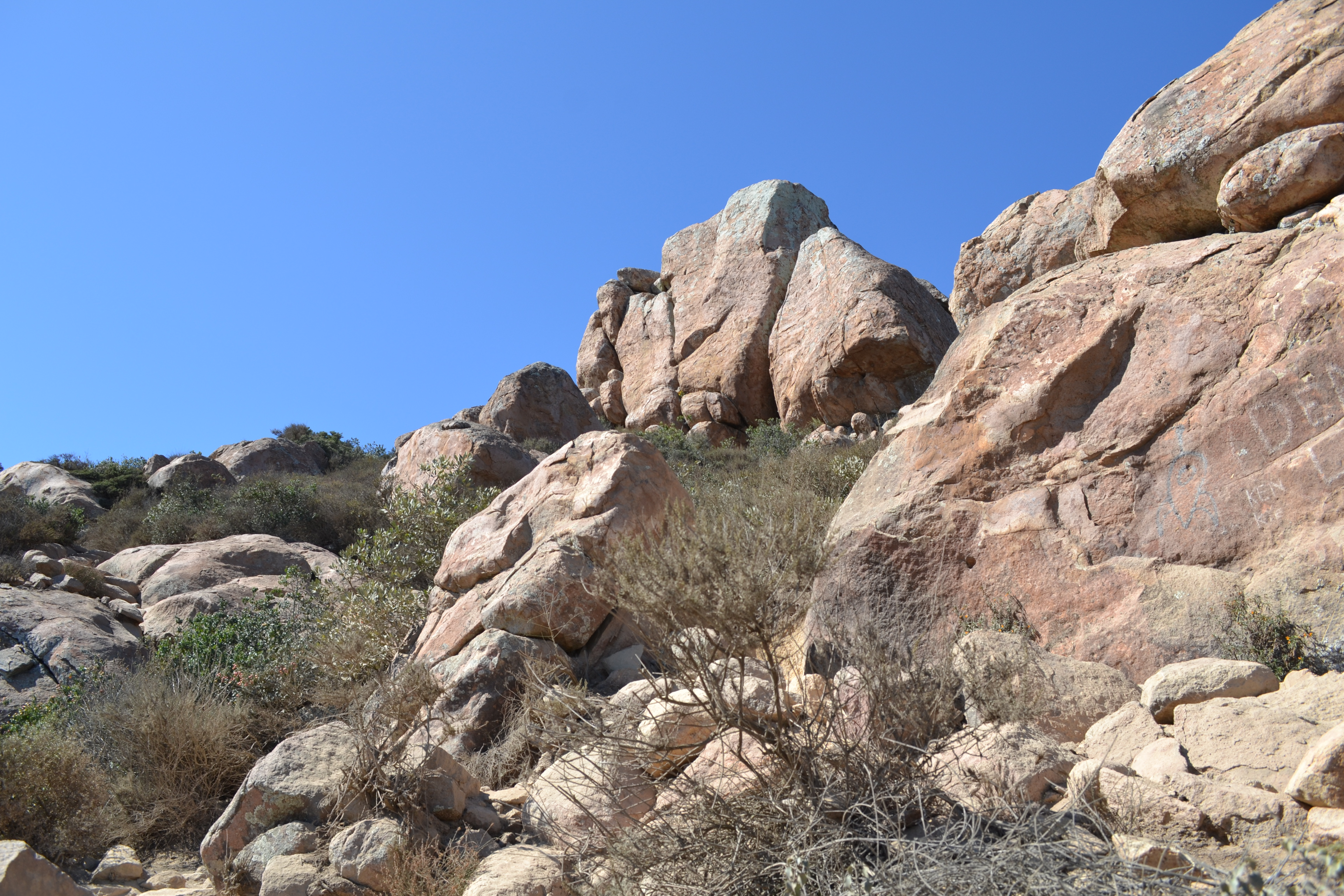
Rocks at the summit of Bishop Peak
