= Morro Creek =

Watercourse in California, United States

Coordinates: 35.3759°N 120.8643°W

Morro Creek is a coastal stream in San Luis Obispo County, in the central region of the U.S. state of California. The watercourse flows from the Santa Lucia Mountains to discharge into the Pacific Ocean, at its mouth on Estero Bay, near the city of Morro Bay.

== Natural history ==
The creek is in the coastal sage and chaparral section of the California chaparral and woodlands Ecoregion. Historically this watershed had habitats containing considerable amounts of chaparral, and scarce Oak woodlands, and Grey Pine (Pinus sabiniana) trees.

== Cultural history ==
The lower reaches of Morro Creek were used as a significant settlement of the Chumash tribe since at least the Millingstone Horizon.

There is also incidence of historic mining of chromium within the catchment basin. It was used extensively for grazing by the cattle ranches.

== See also ==
- Los Osos Creek
- Morro Bay State Park
- Morro Bay State Park Museum of Natural History
- Morro Bay State Marine Recreational Management Area and Morro Bay State Marine Reserve
- Morro Rock
