= Cerro Cabrillo =

Mountain in Morro Bay State Park, California, United States

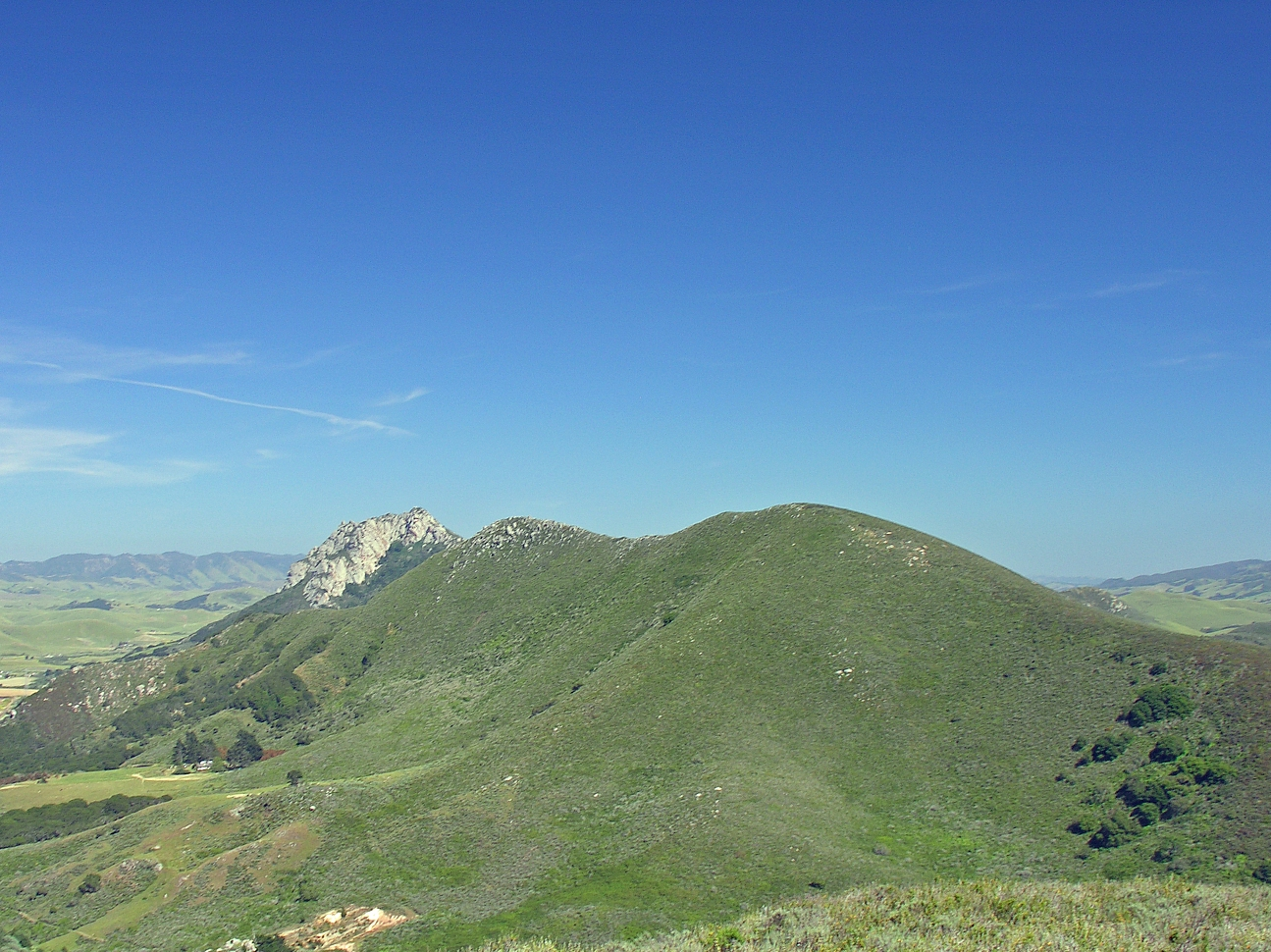
- A picture of Cerro Cabrillo from Black Hill. A portion of Hollister Peak can be seen.

Highest point
- Elevation: 914 ft (279 m) NAVD 88
- Coordinates: 35°21′08″N 120°48′54″W

Geography
- Location: San Luis Obispo County, California
- Parent range: Santa Lucia Range
- Topo map: USGS Morro Bay South

Geology
- Rock age: 20 million years
- Mountain type: Volcanic plug

Cerro Cabrillo, also known locally as Cabrillo Peak, is a rocky mountain in eastern Morro Bay State Park, San Luis Obispo County, central California.

== Geography ==
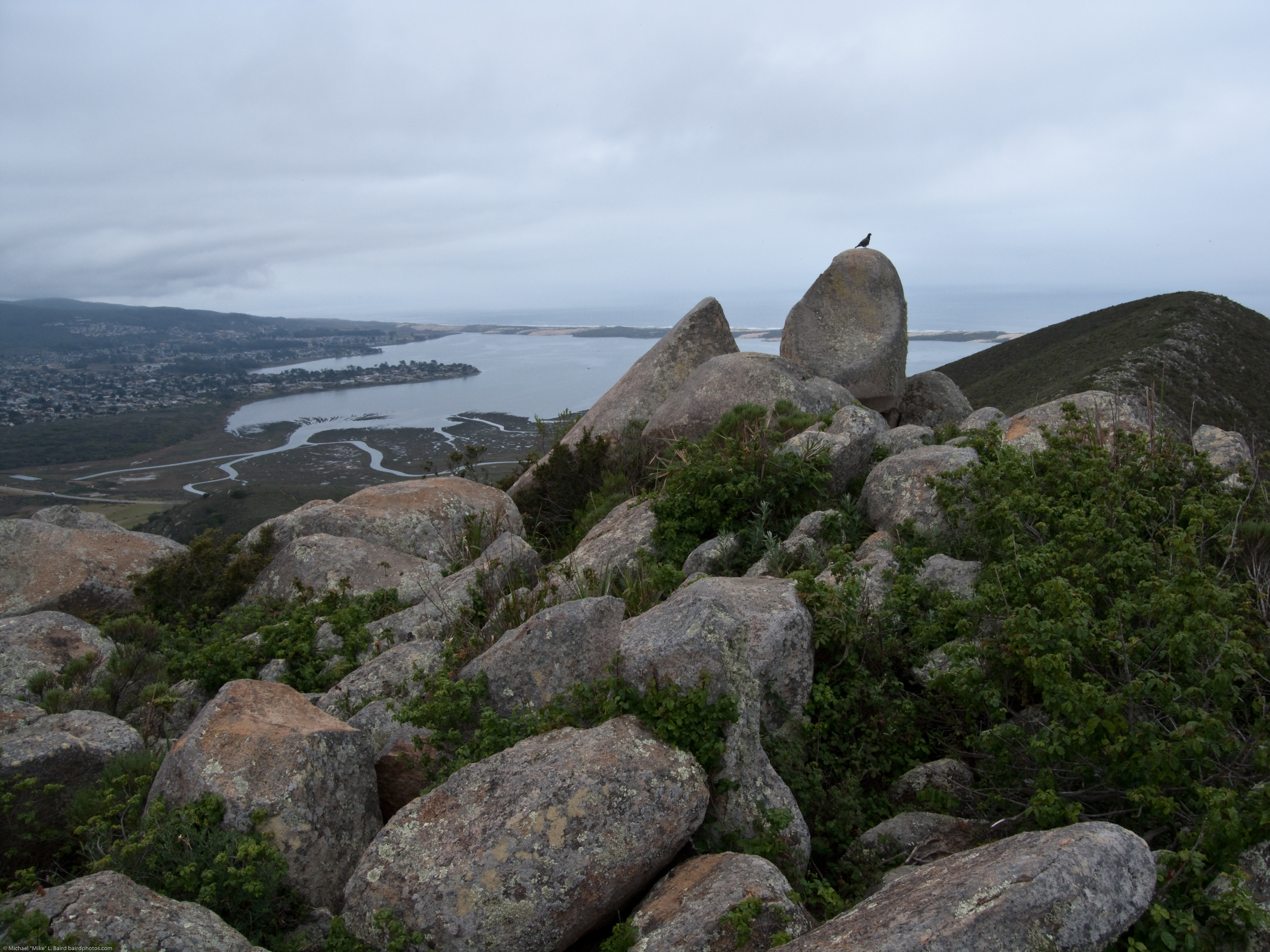
Summit of Cerro Cabrillo and Morro Bay estuary, 2009.

Cerro Cabrillo is one of the Nine Sisters, a group of nine volcanic landmarks in the area. Others include Morro Rock and Hollister Peak. It is named after Juan Rodríguez Cabrillo, a Spanish maritime explorer, who was sailing off the coast in 1542.

The rock outcrop, composed mostly of rhyodacite, is a volcanic plug formed when magma welled up underneath a layer of softer rock and solidified. The softer overlying rock has since eroded away, leaving a distinct, rugged shape. On its east face is a rock formation named Tiki Rock, because of its resemblance to a Polynesian Tiki carving.

== Access ==
The slopes and peak of Cerro Cabrillo are popular with hikers and rock climbers, with trailheads in Morro Bay State Park.

Its slopes support many chaparral and coastal sage scrub wild flowers, such as Deer Weed (Acmispon glaber), Soap plant (Chlorogalum pomeridianum), and Chaparral checkerbloom (Sidalcea hickmanii).

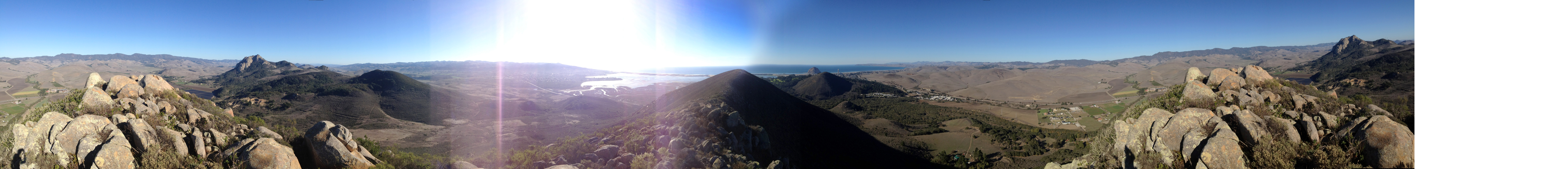
View from the top of Cerro Cabrillo.

== See also ==
- Morro Bay State Park
