= Central Coast (California) =

Coordinates: 35.6°N 121.1°W

- Region of California
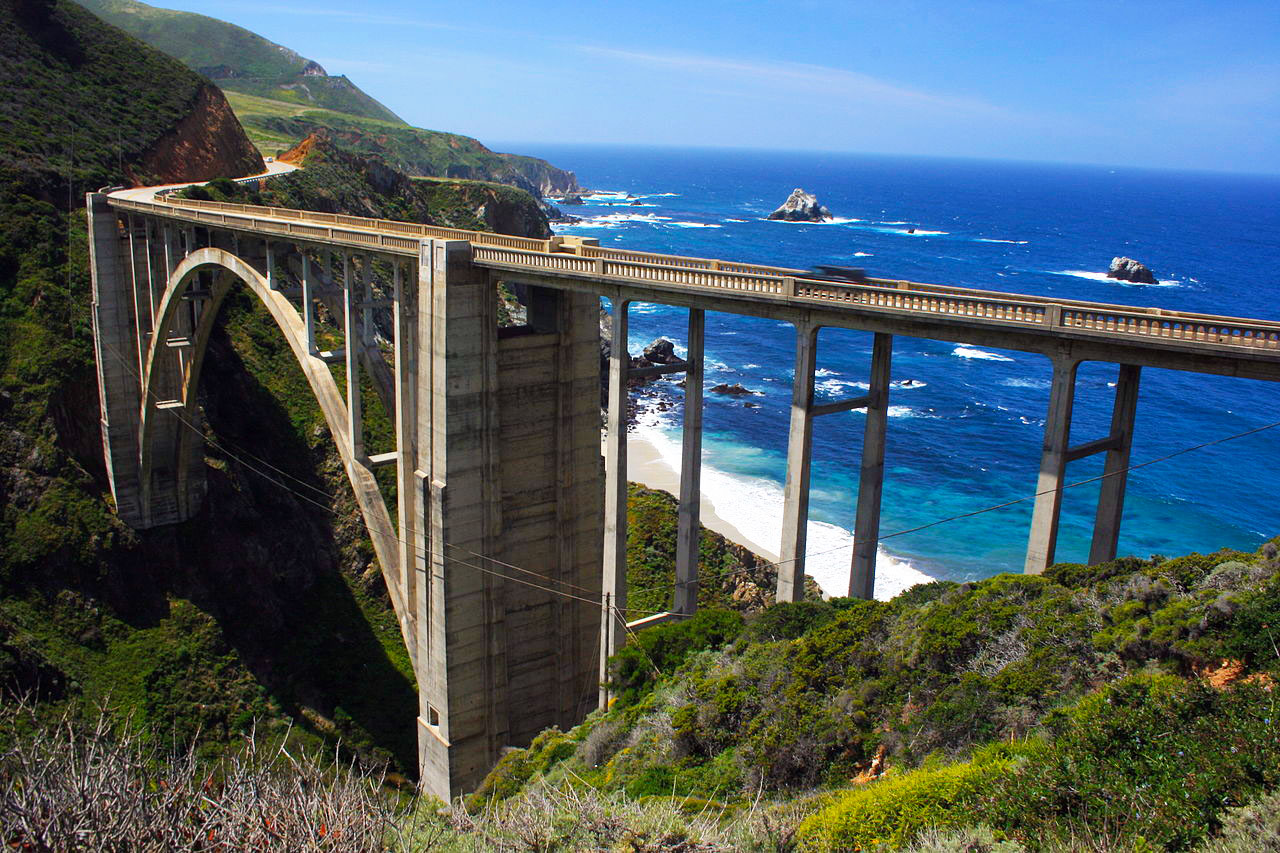
- Bixby Creek Bridge in Big Sur, along the Central Coast

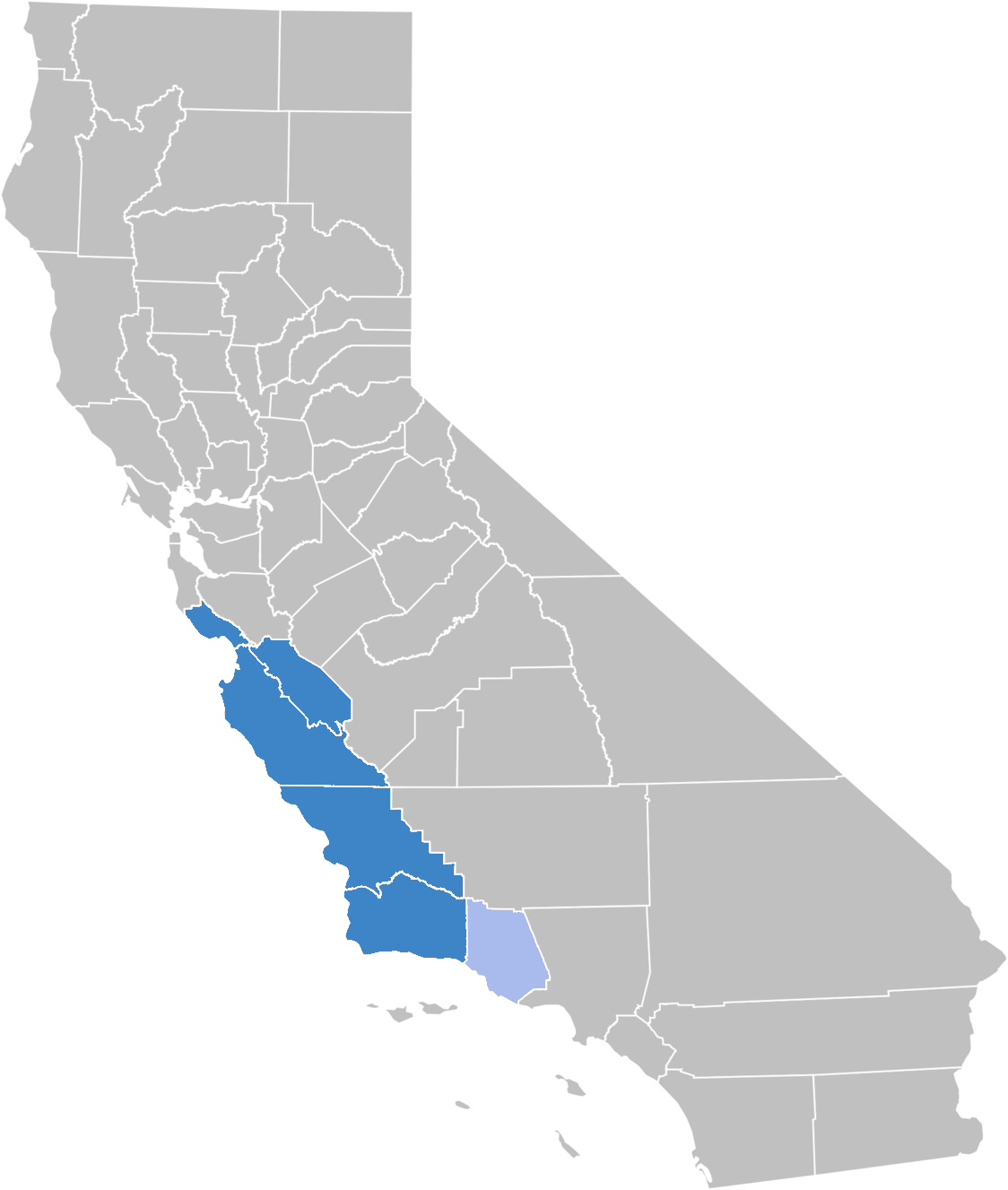
- Location of the Central Coast in California (Ventura County, shown in lighter shade, is the region's southernmost county but is also frequently classified as part of Southern California)
- Country: United States
- State: California
- Largest city: Oxnard

Population (6 counties)
  - Total: 2,348,601

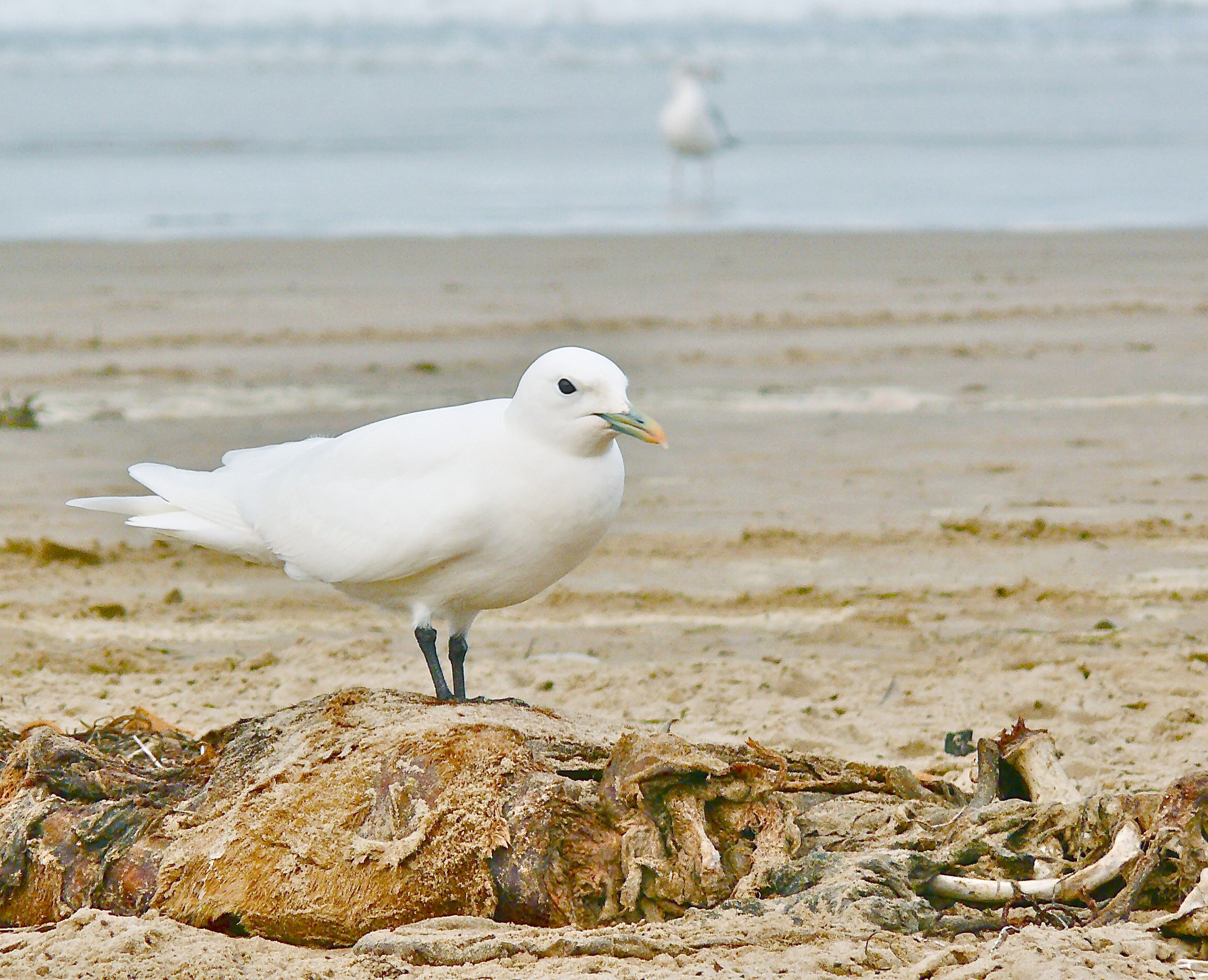
A rare vagrant ivory gull on a Central Coast beach

The Central Coast is an area of California, roughly spanning the coastal region between Point Mugu and Monterey Bay. It lies northwest of Los Angeles and south of the San Francisco Bay Area, and includes the rugged, rural, and sparsely populated stretch of coastline known as Big Sur.

From south to north, the core counties of the Central Coast are Santa Barbara, San Luis Obispo, Monterey, San Benito, and Santa Cruz; broader definitions also extend the region south to include Ventura County, which is more commonly classified as part of Southern California.

The Central Coast is the location of the Central Coast AVA.

Geographically, the actual midpoint of the California coast lies north of Santa Cruz, near Año Nuevo State Park in San Mateo County. Neither the popular use of the term Central Coast nor that of the California North Coast include the San Francisco Peninsula counties of San Mateo and San Francisco.

== Overview ==
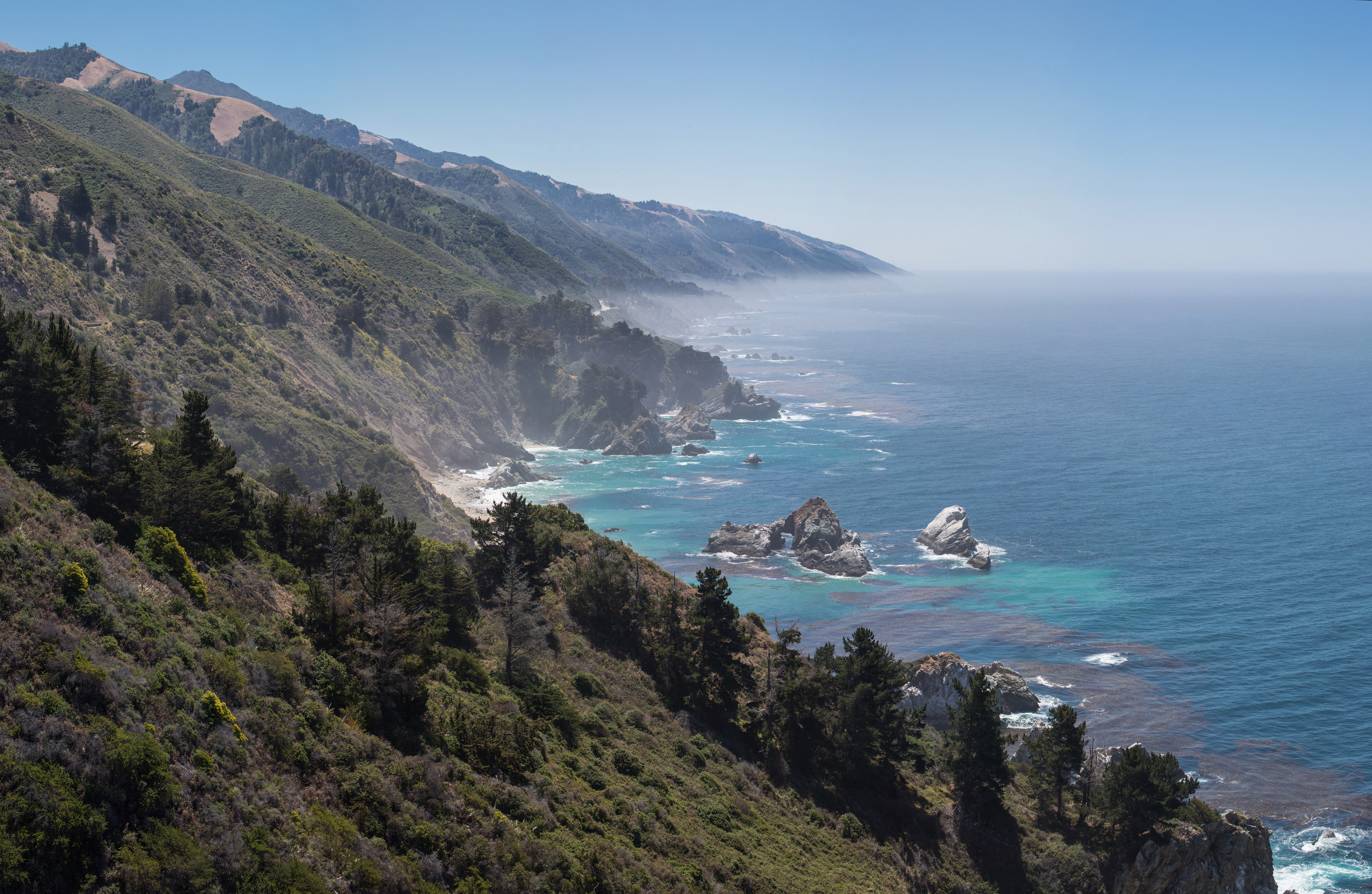
Central Californian Coastline, Big Sur

The region is known primarily for agriculture and tourism. Major crops include wine grapes, lettuce, strawberries, and artichokes. The Salinas Valley is one of the most fertile farming regions in the United States. Tourist attractions include Cannery Row in Monterey, the Monterey Bay Aquarium, the theatres, galleries and white sand beaches of Carmel-by-the-Sea, the golf courses of Pebble Beach and the Monterey Peninsula, the rugged coastline of Big Sur and Hearst Castle in San Simeon. Further south is Morro Rock and the port city of Morro Bay, which is adjacent to college town San Luis Obispo. The Santa Ynez Valley is home to the Central Coast Film Society, which celebrates filmmakers, cinema and media arts that are from the region, also known as "Hollywood's Backyard."

The area is not densely populated. The largest city in the region is Oxnard in Ventura County, with a population estimated at 203,007 in 2013.

== History ==
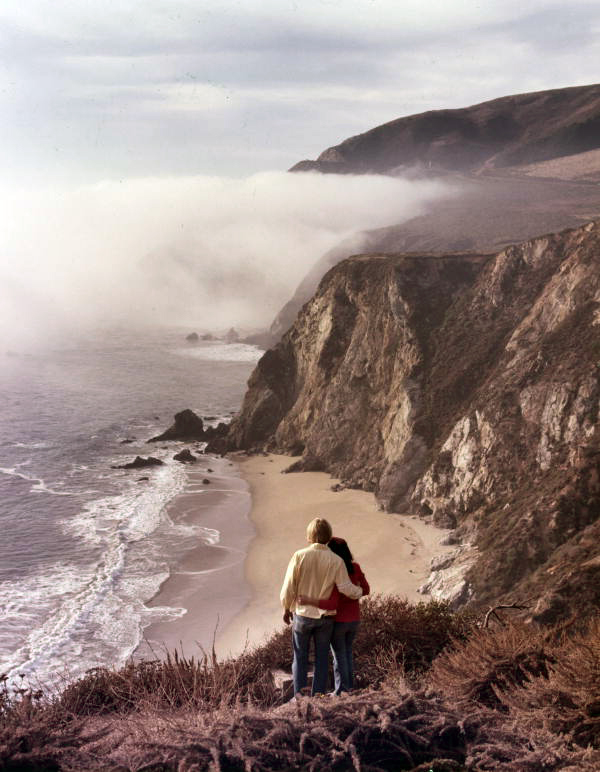
Big Sur, California

The Central Coast area was inhabited by Chumash, Ohlone, Esselen, Salinan, and other Native American people since at least 10,000 BC. Many of these communities were coastal, where the people utilized marine resources and dwelt near freshwater inflows to the Pacific Ocean. For example, there were significant communities near the mouth of Morro Creek and Los Osos Creek.Evidence found on San Miguel Island dates approximately 10,200-8500 bp, in the Early Holocene period, indicating coastal adaptations. Research shows Indigenous communities relied on shellfish, fishing, shell bead production as possible currency, and seafaring technology. Bitumen/asphaltum or tar pellets were used in boat making, waterproofing, and general adhesive, supporting trade. This also further shows evidence of inter-island connection and interactions.

After the Spanish established the California missions in 1770, they baptized and forced the indigenous population to labor at the missions. While living at the missions, the indigenous population was exposed to diseases unknown to them, like smallpox and measles, for which they had no immunity, devastating the indigenous population and their culture. Many of the remaining indigenous peoples assimilated with Spanish and Mexican ranchers in the nineteenth century.

Under Spanish law, the indigenous people were technically free individuals, but they could be compelled by force to labor without pay. With the help of the soldiers who guarded the mission, the Indigenous Californians who lived near the mission were forcibly relocated, conscripted, and trained as plowmen, shepherds, cattle herders, blacksmiths, and carpenters on the mission. Disease, starvation, over work, and torture decimated the tribe.

=== Resistance ===
Native Californian history and culture did not stagnate after the Spanish Missions were established. Native Californians all had different lived experiences during the mission, some saw it as advantages, others organized resistances. There is archaeological and historical evidence that shows different ways Native Californians maintained their traditions. An examination of arrowheads recovered at sites along the central coast show that the arrowheads retained pre-contact form, but used new materials such as glass and metal. This shows evolving practices but also the perseverance and adaptability of culture.

There is a history of organized resistances by Native Californians and resistances organized by women. At the Santa Cruz Mission in the central California coast, there was an assassination organized by an Ohlone woman, Yaquenonsat. She held a high position within the community and the mission which allowed her to covertly plan the assassination of a padre there with a documented history of sexual violence.

Modern day examples of indigenous resistance come in the reinstatement of anthropogenic burning or controlled buring to modify the environment. This traditional practice has been in use for thousands of years to maintain the environment but was suppressed by colonizers. The Amah Mutsun Tribal Band and the Muwekma Ohlone Tribe are some examples of tribes originating from the central coast region that continue these practices.

== Education ==
University of California campuses are found in Santa Barbara and Santa Cruz, near the south and north edges of the region respectively. California State University, Monterey Bay, founded in 1994, uses facilities donated when Fort Ord was converted from military to civilian uses. California Polytechnic State University, in San Luis Obispo, was founded in 1901. California State University Channel Islands opened in Camarillo in 2002, as the 23rd campus in the California State University system.

In November 2024, the Chumash Heritage National Marine Sanctuary was designated. It is the third largest national marine sanctuary in the United States, covering 4543 square miles of Central Coast.

== Population ==
The six counties that make up the Central Coast region had an estimated population of 2,348,601 according to the 2020 census.

=== Counties by population ===
County	FIPS code	County seat	Established	Formed from	Etymology	Population	Area	Map
Ventura County	111	Ventura	1872	Santa Barbara	The city of Ventura, itself an abbreviation of San Buenaventura, Spanish for St. Bonaventure.	843,843	1,846 sq mi (4,781 km^{2})	State map highlighting Ventura County
Santa Barbara County	083	Santa Barbara	1850	Original	The city of Santa Barbara, itself Spanish for Saint Barbara.	448,229	2,738 sq mi (7,091 km^{2})	State map highlighting Santa Barbara County
Monterey County	053	Salinas	1850	Original	Monterey Bay, itself a Spanish compound meaning "royal mountain", from monte ("mountain" or "hill") and rey ("king").	439,035	3,322 sq mi (8,604 km^{2})	State map highlighting Monterey County
San Luis Obispo County	079	San Luis Obispo	1850	Original	The city of San Luis Obispo, itself Spanish for Saint Louis, the Bishop.	282,424	3,304 sq mi (8,557 km^{2})	State map highlighting San Luis Obispo County
Santa Cruz County	087	Santa Cruz	1850	Original	The city of Santa Cruz, itself Spanish for "holy cross"	270,861	446 sq mi (1,155 km^{2})	State map highlighting Santa Cruz County
San Benito County	069	Hollister	1874	Monterey	The San Benito River and its valley, itself named in Spanish after Saint Benedict.	64,209	1,389 sq mi (3,597 km^{2})	State map highlighting San Benito County

=== Major cities ===
The following cities had a population over 20,000 as of the 2020 census:

- Oxnard - 202,063
- Salinas - 163,542
- Thousand Oaks - 126,966
- Simi Valley - 126,356
- Ventura - 110,763
- Santa Maria - 109,707
- Santa Barbara - 88,665
- Camarillo - 70,741
- Santa Cruz - 62,956
- Watsonville - 52,590
- San Luis Obispo - 47,063
- Lompoc - 44,444
- Hollister - 41,678
- Moorpark - 36,284
- Goleta - 32,690
- Seaside - 32,366
- Paso Robles - 31,490
- Santa Paula - 30,657
- Monterey - 30,218
- Atascadero - 29,773
- Soledad - 24,925
- Marina - 22,359
- Port Hueneme - 21,954

== Transportation ==
Travel has been almost entirely by private automobile since state and federal policy shifts away from rail transportation occurred in the early 20th century. Because of its position roughly halfway between the major cities of Los Angeles and San Francisco, San Luis Obispo is home to America's first motel. The major highway is U.S. Route 101, which runs north–south from Los Angeles, through most of the major communities of the Central Coast, to San Francisco. State Route 1, a smaller but much more scenic route, connects the coastal communities, running through San Simeon, Morro Bay, and Big Sur. Amtrak maintains train service with the Coast Starlight and Pacific Surfliner routes along the Union Pacific Railroad Coast Line that also transports freight. There are no major airports, although Monterey, Santa Barbara, Santa Maria and San Luis Obispo have regional airports with commuter service. Greyhound buses serve most of the region.

Monterey-Salinas Transit (MST) operates bus services throughout Monterey County as far south as Big Sur on the coast and King City in the Salinas Valley. MST also offers connection service to San Jose Diridon Station, downtown Santa Cruz, and Paso Robles and Templeton in Northern San Luis Obispo County via regional routes. Santa Cruz Metro offers services within Santa Cruz County, including connections to San Jose and San Jose State and connection to MST service in Watsonville, heading south to Salinas.

== See also ==
- Big Sur
- California State Route 1
- Coastal California
- Carmel-by-the-Sea
- Hearst Castle
- List of tourist attractions in Monterey County, California
- Monterey Peninsula
- Monterey Bay National Marine Sanctuary
  - Davidson Seamount, one of the largest known seamounts in the world
- Salinas Valley
- Santa Cruz Mountains
- Wine Regions
