= Morro Bay State Park =

State Park located in the county of San Luis Obispo, California

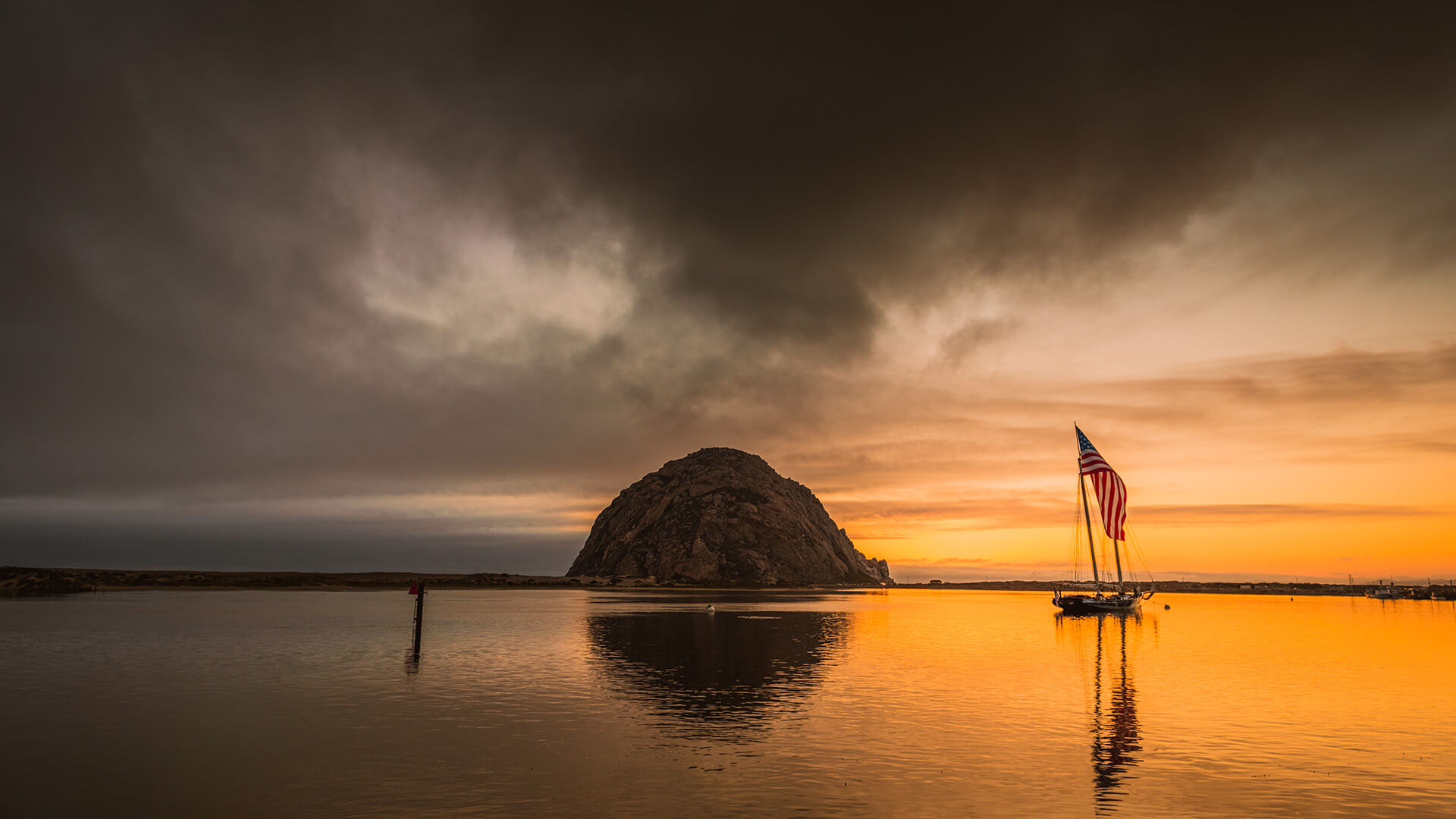

- Location within California Location within the United States
- Location: San Luis Obispo County, California, United States
- Nearest city: Morro Bay
- Coordinates: 35°20′50″N 120°49′33″W
- Established: 1934
- Governing body: California Department of Parks and Recreation

Morro Bay State Park is a state park on the Morro Bay lagoon, in western San Luis Obispo County, on the Central Coast of California. On the lagoon's northeastern and eastern edges in the park, there are saltwater and brackish marshes that support thriving bird populations.

== Recreation ==
There are opportunities for sailing, fishing, hiking, and bird watching. The park's Morro Bay State Park Museum of Natural History has exhibits covering natural features, cultural history, Native American life, geology, and oceanography. The park also has a marina and a public golf course.

Two of the Nine Sisters chain of volcanic peaks, Black Hill and Cerro Cabrillo, are within the park. Black Hill has a trail through the Monterey pine (Pinus radiata) trees in Flemings Forest.

== Marine Protected Areas ==
Morro Bay State Marine Recreational Management Area and Morro Bay State Marine Reserve are marine protected areas offshore from Morro Bay. Like underwater parks, these marine protected areas help conserve ocean wildlife and marine ecosystems.

== History ==
The first settlers of the local area were of the Millingstone Horizon culture, early Chumash Native American peoples. These peoples relied partially on the harvesting of fish and shellfish from Morro Bay. One of the closest local settlements of Chumash to Morro Bay State Park is the Back Bay site, a large Chumash archaeological site on a stabilized sand dune in Los Osos dating to at least as early as 800 to 1200 AD. Cabrillo first encountered the Chumash in the year 1542.

== Gallery ==
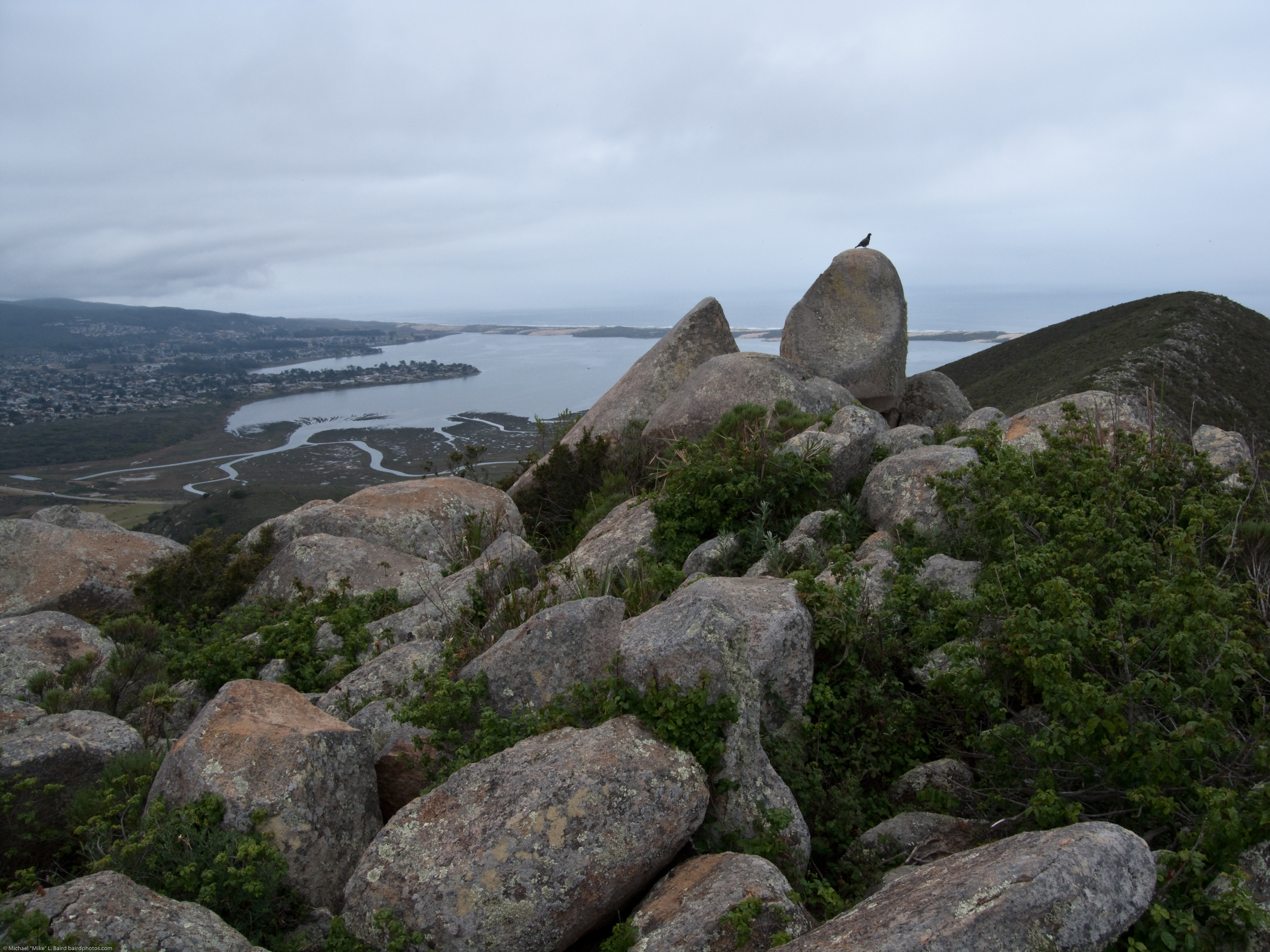
Summit of Cerro Cabrillo and Morro Bay estuary

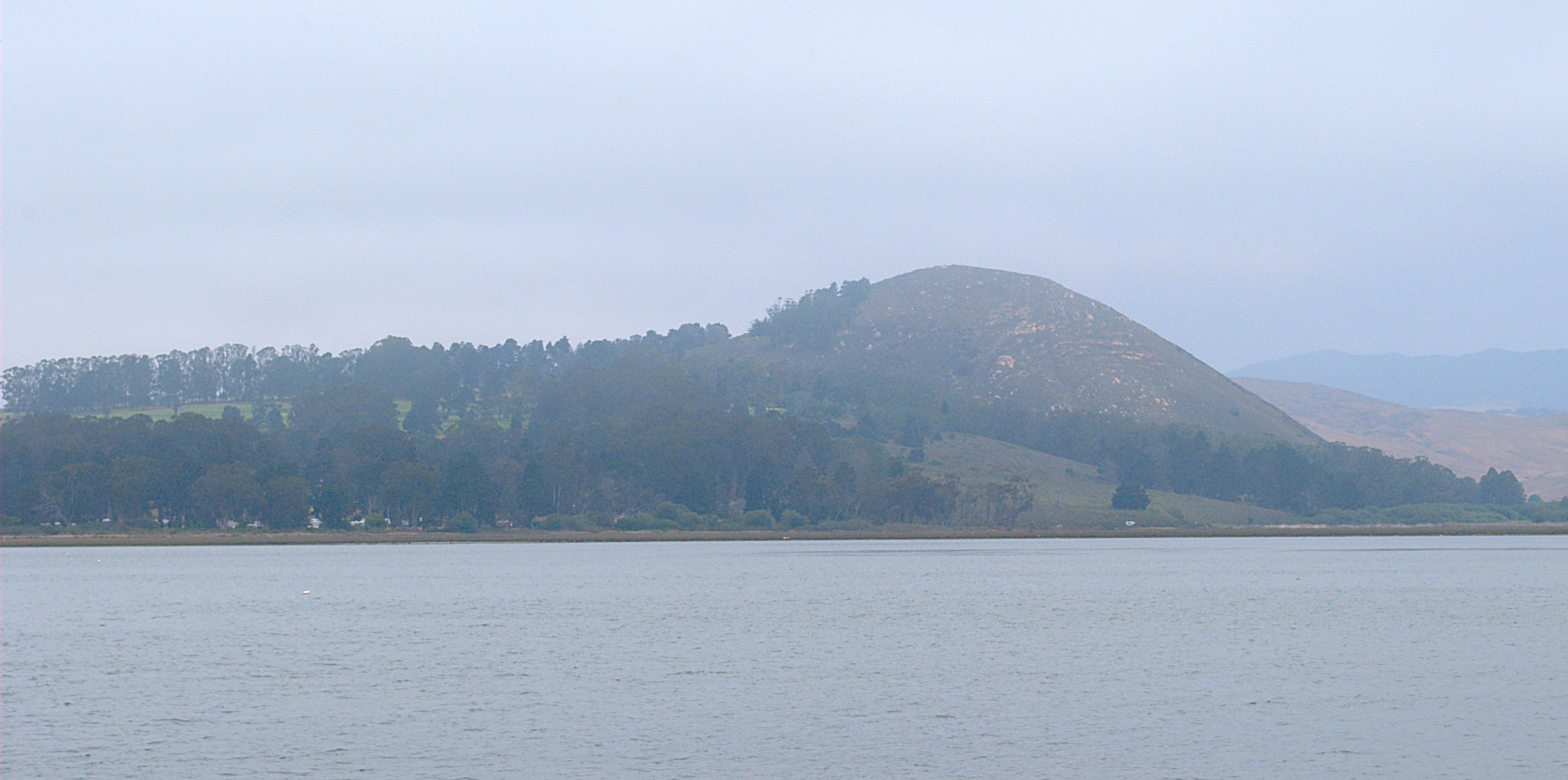
Black Hill in the park.

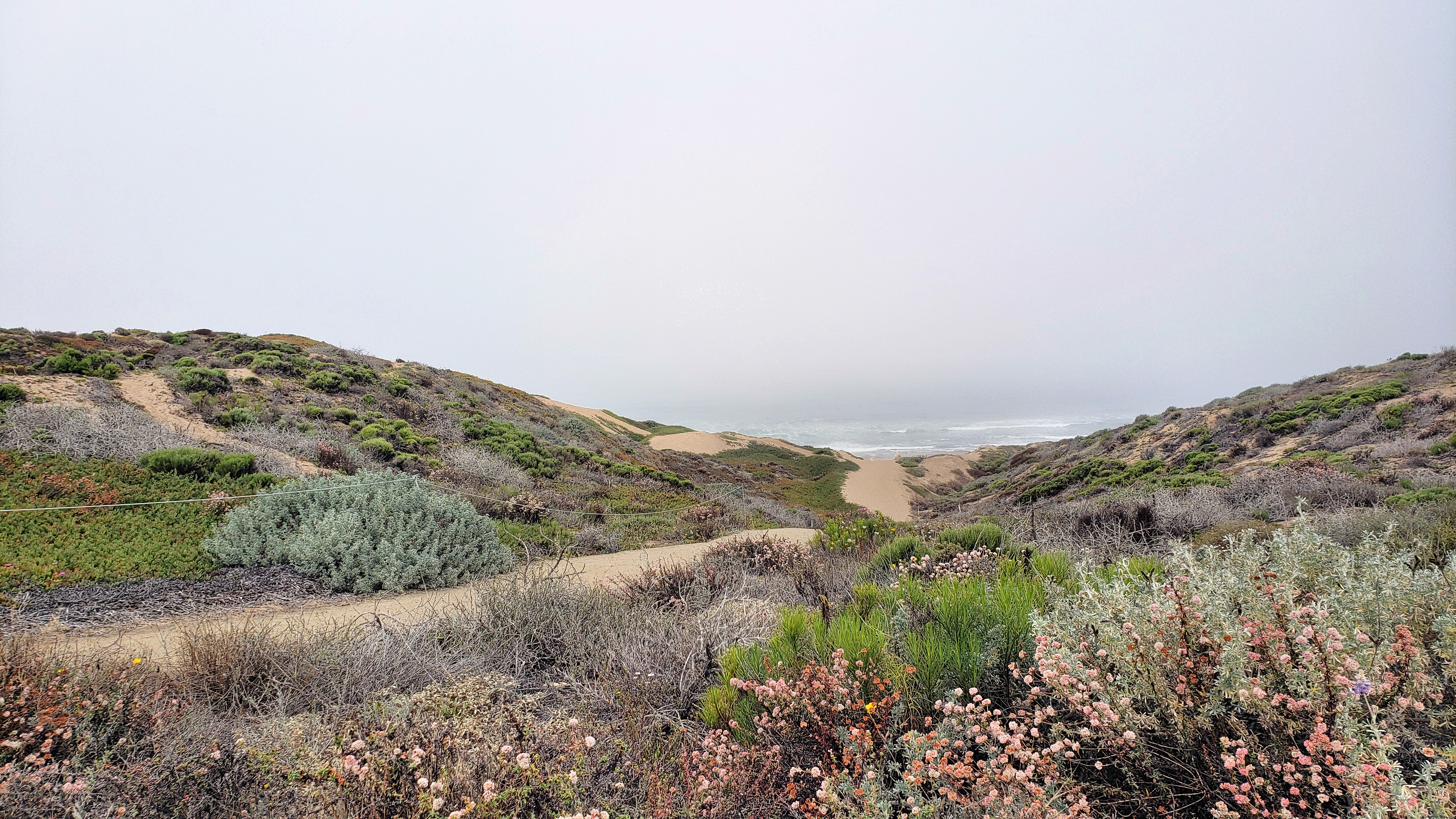
Marine Peninsula Trail path to the ocean

== See also ==
- Morro Rock
- Black Hill
- Cerro Cabrillo
- Montaña de Oro State Park
- List of beaches in California
- List of California state parks
