= Morro Bay State Park Museum of Natural History =

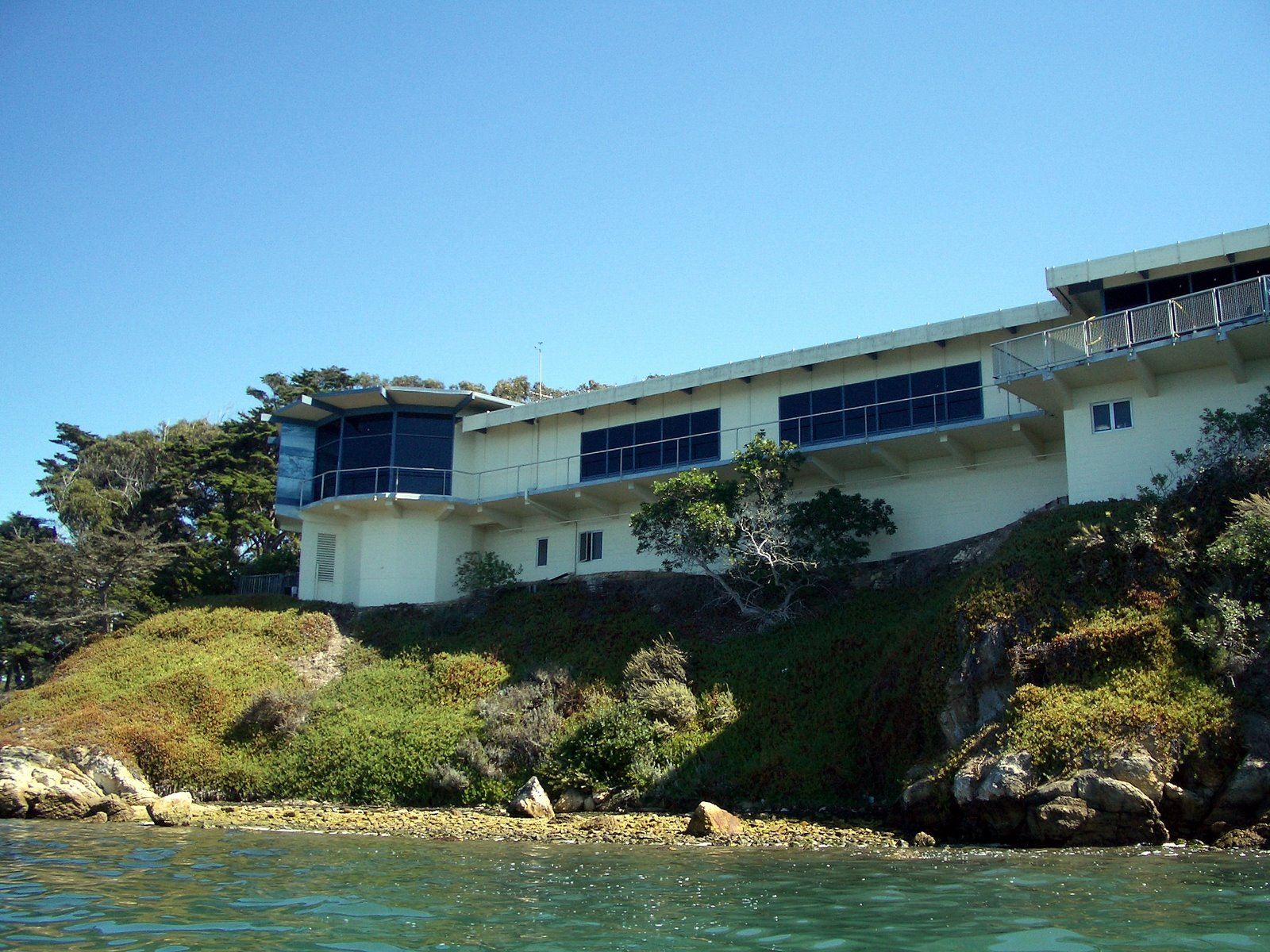
- Morro Bay Museum of Natural History, overlooking the Morro Bay estuary
- Established: 1962
- Location: 60 State Park Rd; Morro Bay, California
- Coordinates: 35.3471°N 120.8442°W
- Type: Natural history museum
- Website: http://www.parks.ca.gov/?page_id=594

The Morro Bay State Park Museum of Natural History is a natural history museum in Morro Bay State Park, Morro Bay, California, United States, opened in 1962.

The museum sits on a hill overlooking the Morro Bay estuary, midway between Los Angeles and San Francisco, with a view of Morro Rock. It is the only natural history museum in the California State Park system.

From 1993 through 2002, the museum was remodeled in a three-phase modernization project, with exhibits by Exhibitgroup Giltspur, which has also created exhibits for the Smithsonian and J. Paul Getty museums. Interactive displays focus on the ecology of the Morro Bay estuary, including building a sand dune, operating the hydrologic cycle and creating food chains.
