= Hollister Peak =

Mountain in California, United States

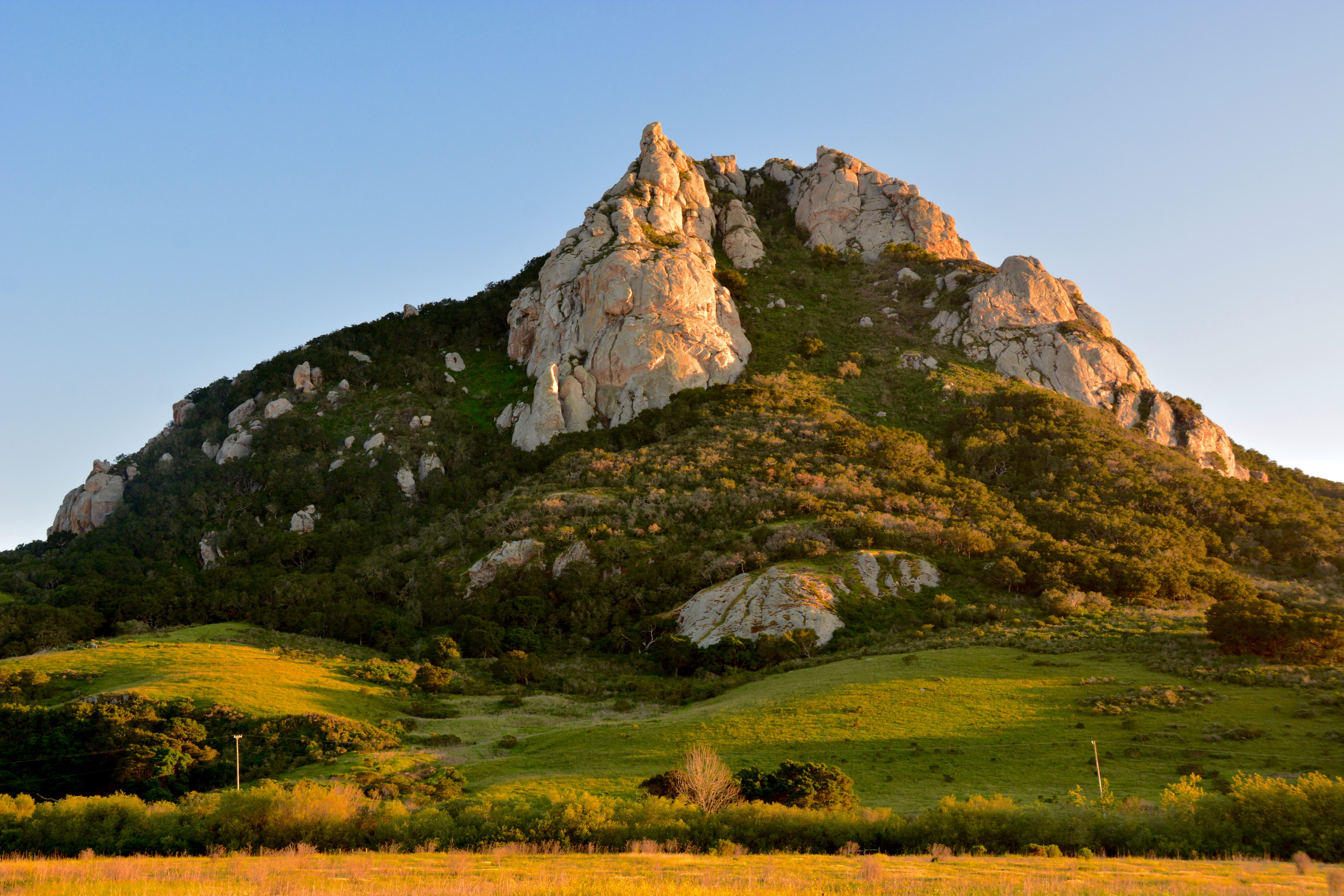
- Hollister Peak

Highest point
- Elevation: 1,411 ft (430 m) NAVD 88
- Coordinates: 35°20′38″N 120°47′12″W

Geography
- Location: San Luis Obispo County, California
- Parent range: Santa Lucia Range
- Topo map: USGS Morro Bay South

Geology
- Rock age: 20 million years
- Mountain type: Volcanic plug
- Volcanic field: Nine Sisters

Hollister Peak is a 1,404-foot (428 m) volcanic plug located near Morro Bay, California. It is one of the Nine Sisters, and receives its name from the family that lived at its base in 1884. It was of religious importance to the Chumash. Hollister Peak is on private property and has no public access.
