= James Horvath =

American writer

James Horvath is a children’s writer, illustrator and author of Dig, Dogs, Dig: A Construction Tail, Build, Dogs, Build: A Tall Tail and Work, Dogs, Work: A Highway Tail. He is also head of Jamestoons Studios, a design company that has illustrated images for ad, marketing and branding agencies as well as other writers.

== Education and background ==
Horvath was born in South Amherst, Ohio. Though he was interested in drawing as a child, he did not know what to do with his hobby. He held down a number of jobs after high school, including a stint in the Navy, in construction and as a bicycle messenger in Washington, D.C. He returned to illustration when he first worked with an Apple computer in 1990 while attending Northern Virginia Community College. He currently resides in Morro Bay, California.

In 2002, Hovath established Jamestoons Studios, and worked with Google, Nestlé, Reader’s Digest, Sprint, Tyco and Toshiba International. His work appeared in advertising, computer games for children and other books. His influences include Josh “Shag” Agle, Theodor “Dr. Seuss” Geisel and Hanna-Barbera cartoons.

== Work ==
Horvath said his inspiration for his series of stories about dogs in construction came from his own sons’ interest in stopping to watch building job sites.

HarperCollins accepted his first book, Dig, Dogs, Dig: A Construction Tail, which tells the story of a construction crew of canines who are building a park, shortly after Horvath attended the Society of Children's Book Writers and Illustrators' Los Angeles summer conference in August 2011. The publisher extended a three-book contract to the writer/illustrator.

Dig, Dogs, Dig: A Construction Tail was published on April 23, 2013; its followup, Build, Dogs, Build: A Tall Tail (a story about the crew taking down and constructing a building) was released on December 30, 2013.Work, Dogs, Work: A Highway Tail will be released on September 23, 2014.

His series of books have been well received by reviewers, with Kirkus Reviews noting that it is engaging and solid. The New York Times also described the illustrations as reflecting Horvath’s influences in comics and cartoons as well as featuring "Hanna-Barbera panoramas". Atlanta Parent also named Dig, Dogs, Dig as one of its Best Books of 2013. The series is also praised for its inclusiveness of female characters in construction and being the favorite of a reviewer’s child.

== List of works ==
- Dig, Dogs, Dig: A Construction Tail (2013) ISBN 978-0062189646
- Build, Dogs, Build: A Tall Tail (2013) ISBN 978-0062189677
- Work, Dogs, Work: A Highway Tail (2014) ISBN 978-0062189707
