= Morro Bay State Marine Recreational Management Area and Morro Bay State Marine Reserve =

Two marine protected areas in California

The Morro Bay State Marine Recreational Management Area and the Morro Bay State Marine Reserve
- IUCN category IV (habitat/species management area)
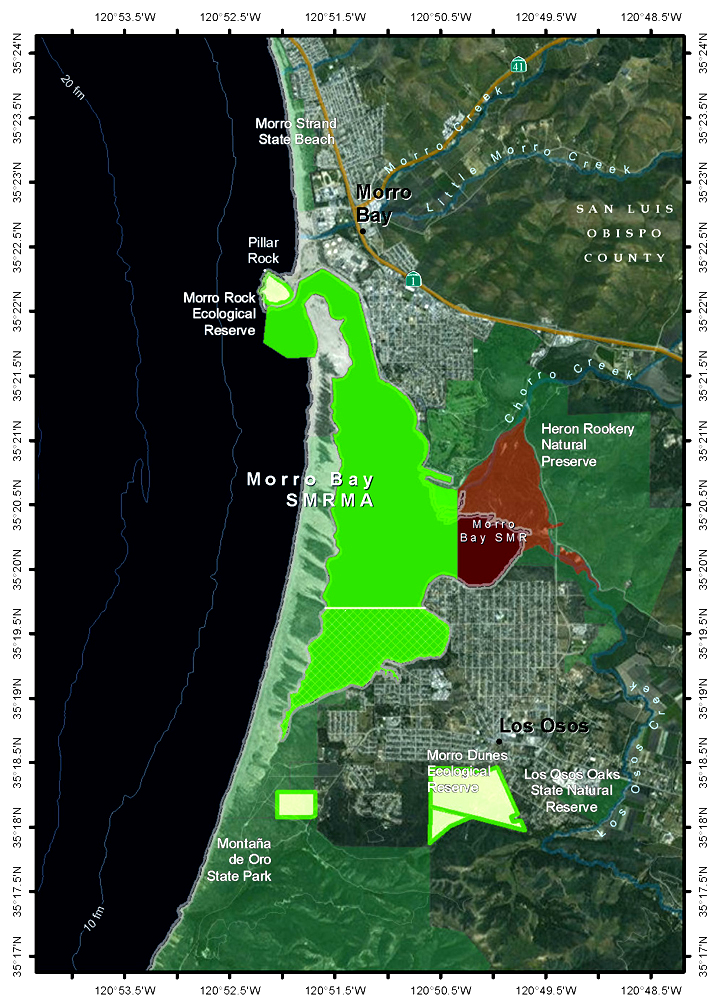
- Map of the SMRMA and SMR in Morro Bay
- Nearest city: Morrow Bay
- Coordinates: 35.3383°N 120.8440°W
- Area: 7.94 km^{2} (3.07 sq mi)
- Designation: California Marine Protected Area
- Designated: 2007
- Administrator: California State Parks
- Website: Morro Bay State Marine Reserve and State Marine Recreational Management Area

Morro Bay State Marine Recreational Management Area (SMRMA) and Morro Bay State Marine Reserve (SMR) are two marine protected areas that provide protection for Morro Bay Estuary on California's central coast. The two marine protected areas together encompass 3.31 square miles (8.6 km^{2}). The SMR protects all marine life within its boundaries. Fishing and take of any living marine resources is prohibited. Within the SMRMA, fishing or taking any living marine resources is prohibited with the exception that, with a valid state water bottom lease and permit, the recreational taking of finfish and the aquaculture of oysters is permitted north of latitude 35° 19.70′ N. Recreational hunting of waterfowl is allowed unless otherwise restricted by hunting regulations.

== History ==
Morro Bay State Marine Recreational Management Area and Morro Bay State Marine Reserve were established in September 2007 by the California Department of Fish & Game. They are two of 29 marine protected areas adopted during the first phase of the Marine Life Protection Act Initiative. The Marine Life Protection Act Initiative (or MLPAI) is a collaborative public process to create a statewide network of marine protected areas along the California coastline.

== Geography and natural features ==
The Morro Bay marine protected areas are near the communities of Morro Bay and Los Osos and adjoin Morro Bay State Park. Morro Rock is a 581-foot volcanic plug located just offshore from Morro Bay, at the entrance to Morro Bay Harbor.

The Morro Bay SMRMA includes the area below mean high tide within Morro Bay east of the Morro Bay entrance breakwater and west of longitude 120° 50.34′ W.

The Morro Bay SMR includes the area below mean high tide line within Morro Bay east of longitude 120° 50.34′ W.

== Habitat and wildlife ==
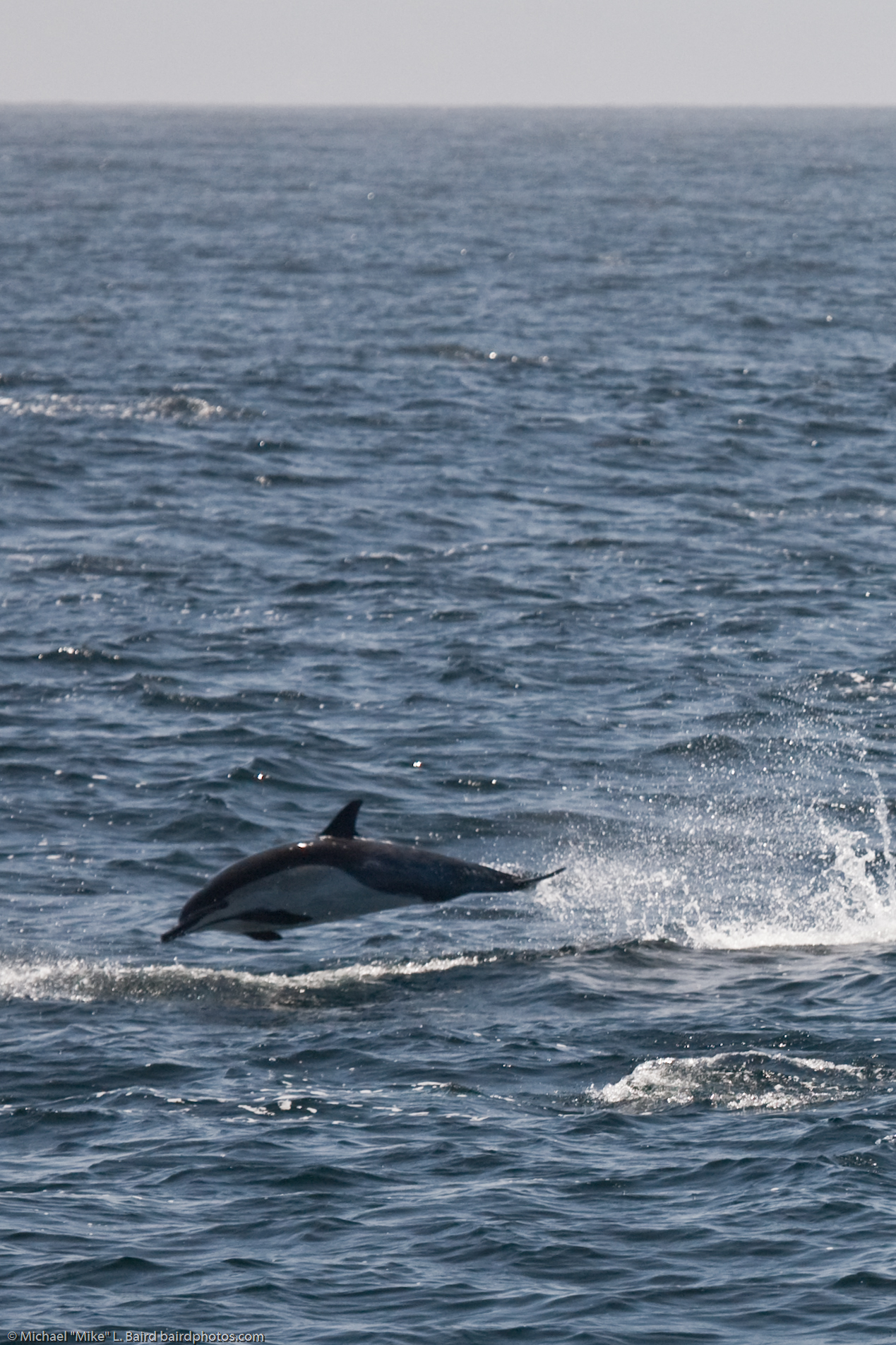
A dolphin breaching in the Pacific Ocean off Morro Bay

Morro Bay Estuary is one of the largest and most important wetland systems on the central coast, sustaining diverse habitats that support sensitive and endangered species. Morro Bay serves as an important resting and foraging ground for migratory birds using the Pacific Flyway. Large and diverse invertebrate populations inhabit the mudflats of the bay; fish use the bay as a nursery ground and dense meadows of eelgrass support a highly productive environment.

== Recreation and nearby attractions ==
Morro Bay supports a variety of recreational activities such as bird watching, sea kayaking, and recreational fishing, and is a working commercial and sport fishing harbor. Whale watching is one of the most well-featured attractions in the area, targeting various migratory species most notably humpback, gray, minke, and blue whales. Various dolphins, killer whales, seals, sea lions, and sea otters are also visible.

Area parks include Morro Bay State Park, Morro Strand State Beach and Montana de Oro State Park which provide hiking trails and campgrounds. Morro Bay State Park includes a Museum of Natural History.

California's marine protected areas encourage recreational and educational uses of the ocean. Activities such as kayaking, diving, snorkeling, and swimming are allowed unless otherwise restricted.

== Scientific monitoring ==
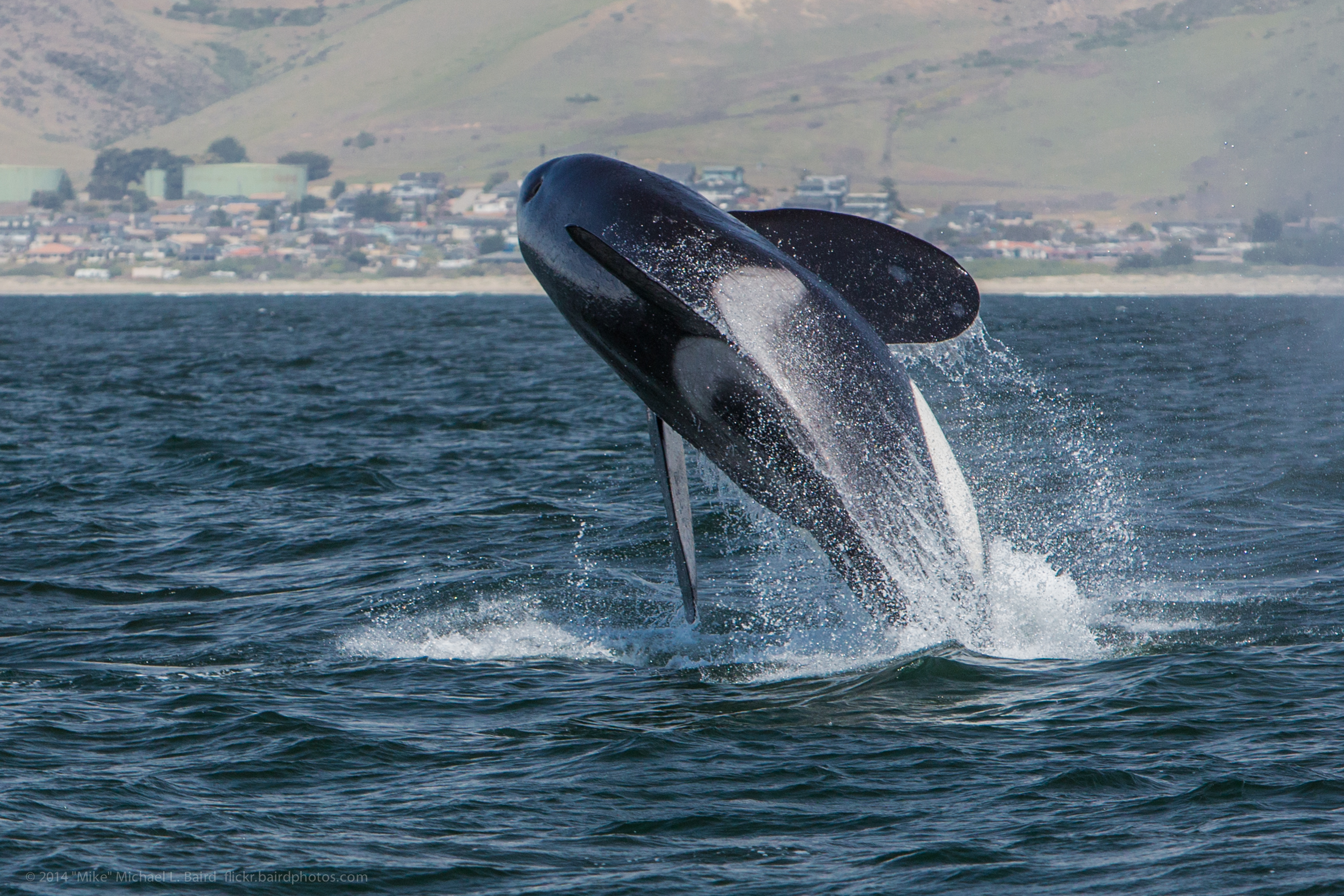
The presence of killer whales proves the richness of Morro Bay's marine ecosystem.

As specified by the Marine Life Protection Act, select marine protected areas along California's central coast are being monitored by scientists to track their effectiveness and learn more about ocean health. Similar studies in marine protected areas located off of the Santa Barbara Channel Islands have already detected gradual improvements in fish size and number.

Local scientific and educational institutions involved in the monitoring include Stanford University's Hopkins Marine Station, University of California Santa Cruz, Moss Landing Marine Laboratories and Cal Poly San Luis Obispo. Research methods include hook-and-line sampling, intertidal and scuba diver surveys, and the use of remote operated vehicle (ROV) submarines.

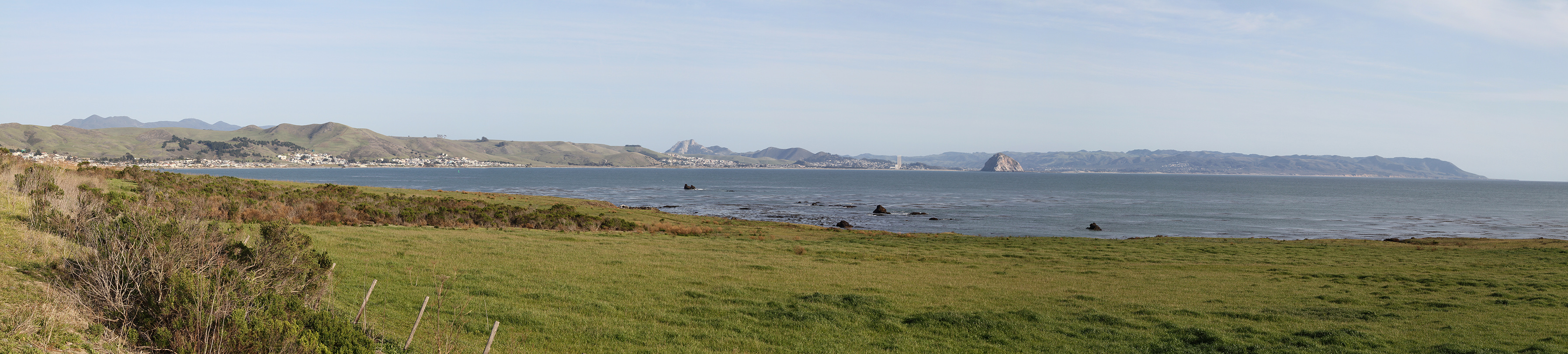
A panoramic view of Estero Bay (California), US, with the town of Cayucos on the left, Morro Bay/Morro Rock center, and Point Buchon/Montana de Oro State Park on the right.
