= Los Osos Creek =

Stream in San Luis Obispo County, California, U.S.

Coordinates: 35.3353494°N 120.8260407°W

Los Osos Creek is a stream in coastal San Luis Obispo County that discharges to Morro Bay. Los Osos Creek rises in the Clark Valley on the slopes of the Irish Hills. After flowing through Clark Valley, Los Osos Creek flows into Los Osos Valley. In prehistoric times Chumash Native Americans had a significant settlement on a stabilized sand dune near the mouth of Los Osos Creek.

== See also ==
- Morro Rock
