= Black Hill (California) =

Mountain situated in Morro Bay, California, United States

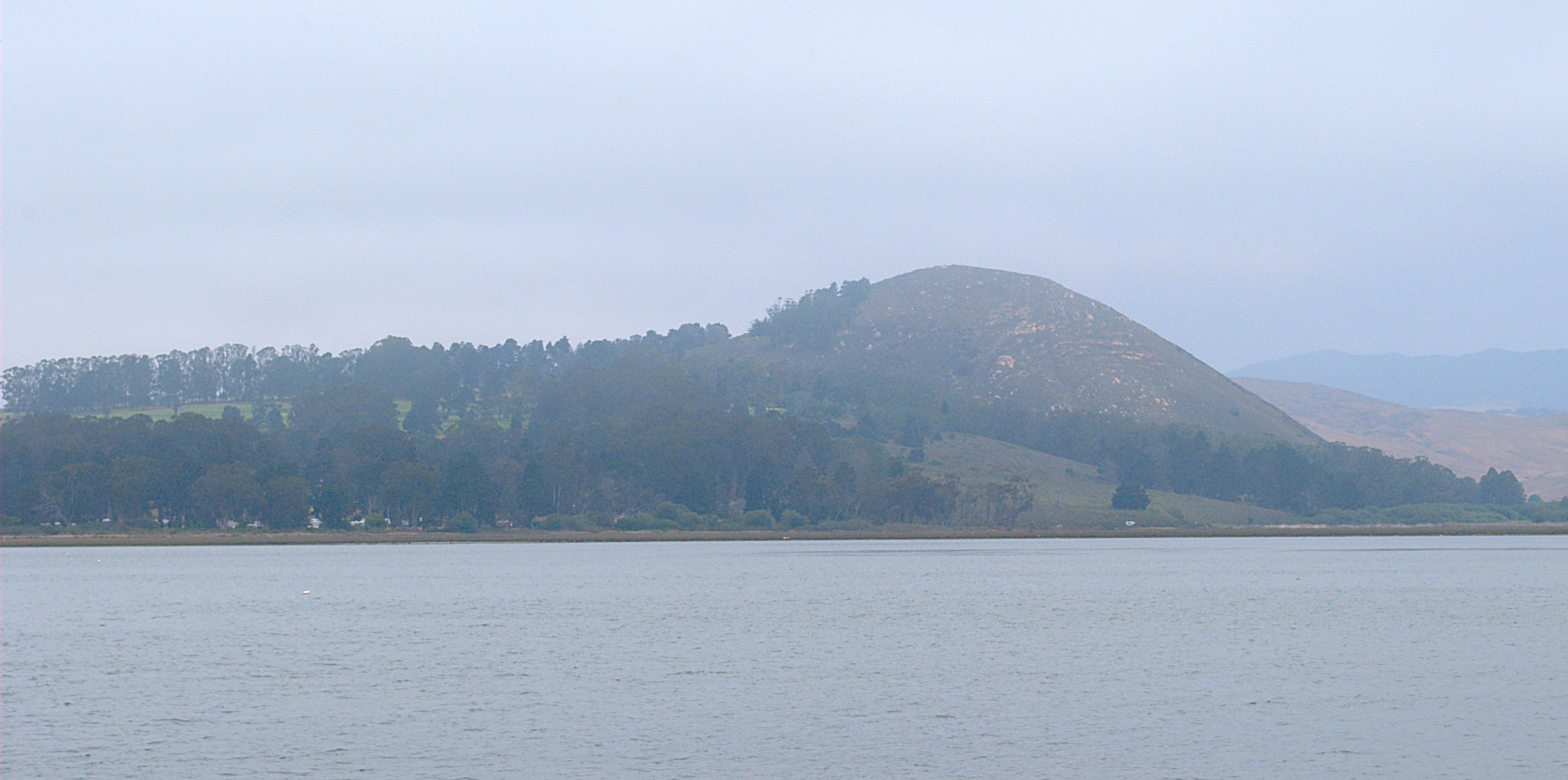
- Black Hill.

Highest point
- Elevation: 663 ft (202 m) NAVD 88
- Coordinates: 35°21′31″N 120°49′54″W

Geography
- Location: Morro Bay, California
- Parent range: Santa Lucia Range
- Topo map: Morro Bay South

Geology
- Rock age: 20 million years
- Mountain type: Volcanic plug

Black Hill is a mountain situated in Morro Bay, California, part of Morro Bay State Park. It is one of a series of volcanic plugs called the Nine Sisters.

== Monterey pine forest ==
There is a forest of Monterey pine (Pinus radiata) trees on Black Hill, called Fleming's Forest, planted by John Fleming, a park superintendent. Fleming was working on another project and ordered twice as many trees as he needed, thinking that he would not get his entire order. Nevertheless, he received it in full and used the surplus on Black Hill.

Many of the trees have died or are dying from pine pitch canker, a fungal disease which also threatens the Monterey pine's remnant native groves in Cambria and on the Monterey Peninsula.
