= Millingstone Horizon =

Archaeological period of Native American dominance in California, United States

Millingstone Horizon is an archaeological period of Native American dominance denoting a period in California, United States involving extensive use of manos and other grinding technology. The interval is a subset of the Archaic Period; specifically Millingstone is usually applied to the period 6500 to 1500 BCE. Alternatively this epoch within North America is known as the Encinitas Tradition. Archaeological recovery from a number of sites in California has yielded evidence of Native American habitation and daily life in this period that ended around 3,500 years ago.

== Example sites ==
The Chumash people, who inhabited much of present-day San Luis Obispo County, Santa Barbara County, and Ventura County have Millingstone Horizon elements in their history. For example, an extensive site at Morro Creek in the present day town of Morro Bay has yielded evidence of coastal Chumash in the Millingstone period.

== See also ==
- Chumash
- Quern-stone
- Native American history of California
