= Morro Bay, California =

City in California, United States

- City
- View of Morro Bay from Black Hill Morro Bay Power Plant and northern bayfront

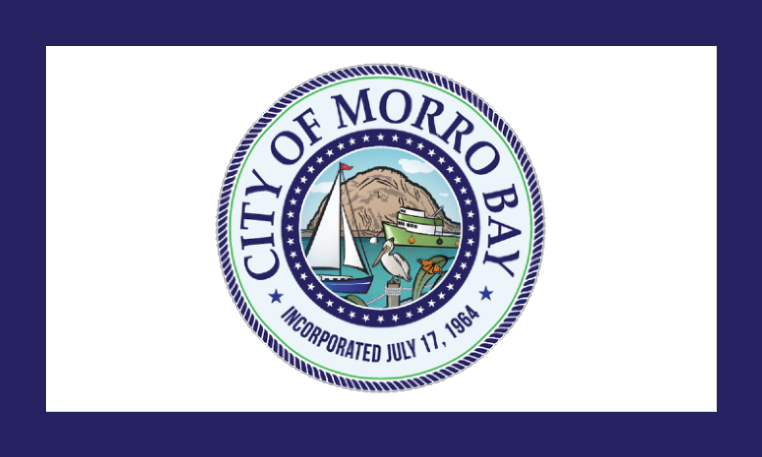
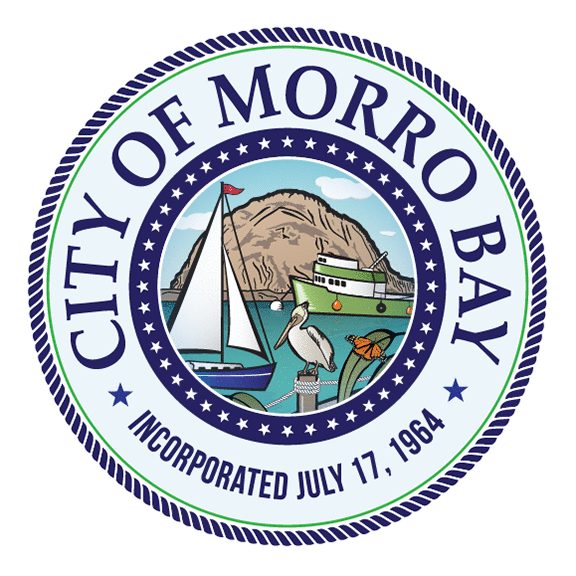
- Flag Seal
- Nickname(s): "Three Stacks and a Rock"
- Motto: Come Get Salty in Morro Bay
- Interactive map of Morro Bay, California
- Location within California Location within the United States
- Coordinates: 35°22′02″N 120°50′48″W
- Country: United States
- State: California
- County: San Luis Obispo
- Founded: 1870
- Incorporated: July 17, 1964
- Named for: Morro Rock

Government
  - Type: Council–manager
  - Body: Morro Bay City Council
  - Mayor: Carla Wixom
  - City Manager: John Craig
  - Council Members: List: • Cyndee Edwards; • Jeff Eckles; • Zara Landrum; • Bill Luffee
  - Assemblymember: Dawn Addis (D)
  - State Senator: John Laird (D)

Area
  - Total: 10.32 sq mi (26.74 km^{2})
  - Land: 5.33 sq mi (13.80 km^{2})
  - Water: 5.00 sq mi (12.95 km^{2}) 48.41%
- Elevation: 62 ft (19 m)

Population (2020)
  - Total: 10,757
  - Density: 2,019/sq mi (779.5/km^{2})
- Time zone: UTC−08:00 (PST)
  - Summer (DST): UTC−07:00 (PDT)
- ZIP codes: 93442–93443
- Area code: 805
- FIPS code: 06-49362
- GNIS feature ID: 1661062
- Website: www.morrobayca.gov

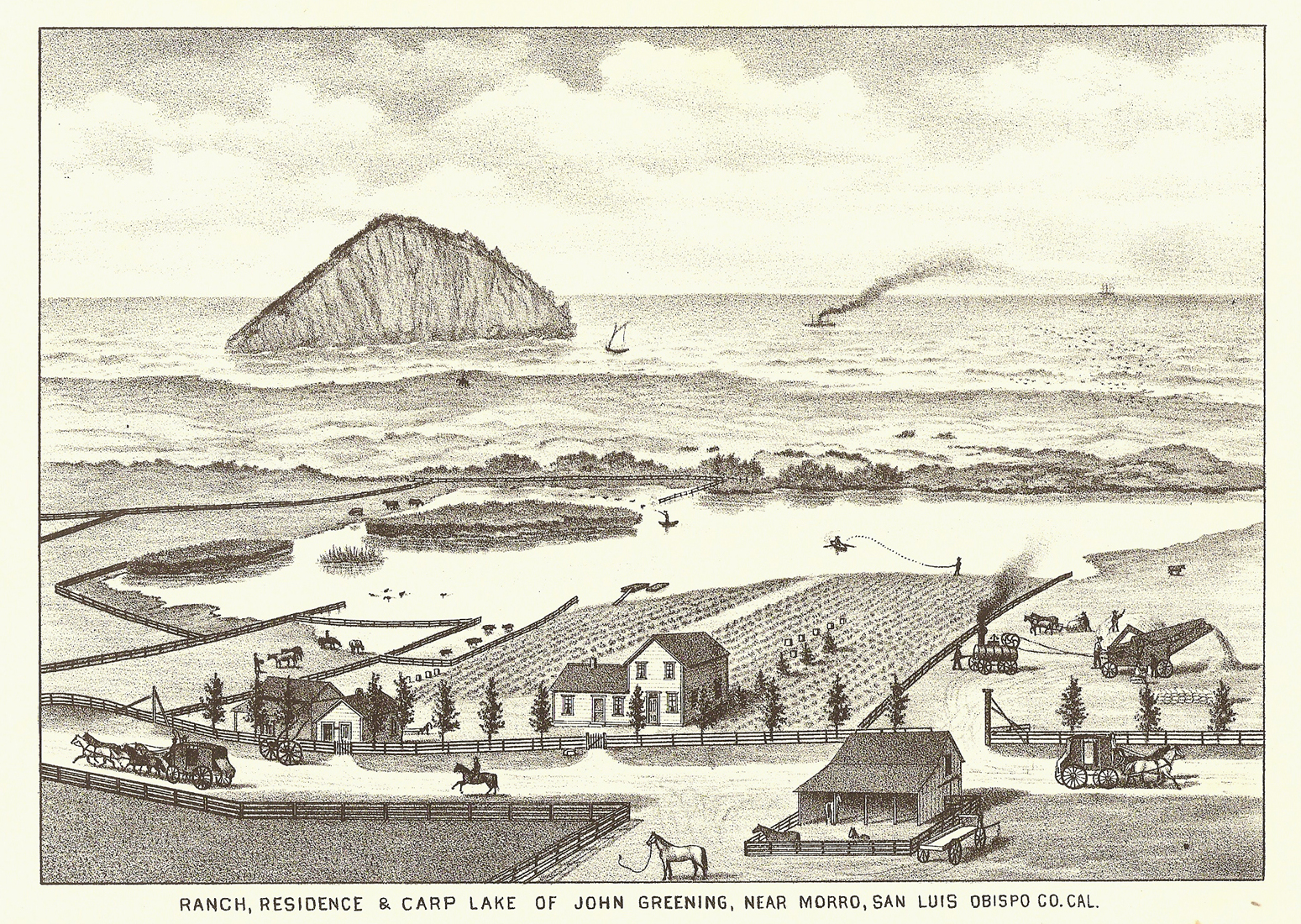
Morro Rock in 1883

Morro Bay (Morro, Spanish for "Hill") is a seaside city in San Luis Obispo County, California, United States. Located on the Central Coast of California, the town overlooks Morro Bay, a natural embayment with an all-weather, small-craft, commercial, and recreational harbor.

== History ==
The prehistory of Morro Bay relates to Chumash settlement, particularly near the mouth of Morro Creek. At least as early as the Millingstone Horizon thousands of years before present, an extensive settlement existed along the banks and terraces above Morro Creek. A tribal site on present-day Morro Bay was named tsɨtqawɨ, Obispeño for "Place of the Dogs".

The first recorded Filipinos to visit America arrived at Morro Bay on October 18, 1587, from the Spanish galleon Nuestra Señora de la Esperanza; one of whom was killed by local Native Americans while scouting ahead.

The first European land exploration of Alta California, the Spanish Portolá expedition, came down Los Osos Valley and camped near today's Morro Bay on September 8, 1769. Franciscan missionary and expedition member Juan Crespí noted in his diary, "we saw a great rock in the form of a round morro".

While governed by Mexico, large land grants split the surrounding area into cattle and dairy ranchos, which needed shipping to bring in dry goods and to carry their crops, animals, and other farm products to cities.

The town of Morro Bay was founded by Franklin Riley in 1870 as a port for the export of dairy and ranch products. He was instrumental in the building of a wharf, which has now become the Embarcadero. During the 1870s, schooners could often be seen at the Embarcadero, picking up wool, potatoes, barley, and dairy products.

A subspecies of butterfly, the "Morro Bay Blue" or "Morro Blue" (Icaricia icarioides moroensis) was first found at Morro Beach by entomologist Robert F. Sternitzky, in June 1929.

During World War II, a US Navy base, Amphibious Training Base Morro Bay, was on the north side of Morro Rock, where sailors were trained to operate LCVPs. The breakwater on the southwest side of the rock was built in 1944–45 to protect the LCVPs entering and leaving the harbor. Soldiers from Camp San Luis Obispo came to Morro Bay and practice loading into the LCVPs. Many of those men were at Normandy on D-Day.

In the 1940s, Morro Bay developed an abalone-fishing industry; it peaked in 1957; stocks of abalone had declined significantly due to overfishing. Halibut, sole, rockfish, albacore, and many other species are still caught by both commercial and sport vessels. In addition, oysters are grown by aquaculture in the shallow back bay.

In the 1950s, the Pacific Gas and Electric Company built the Morro Bay Power Plant, which created jobs and increased the tax base and led to the city acquiring the nickname "Three Stacks and a Rock". The city incorporated in 1964. The plant closed in February 2014.

== Geography ==
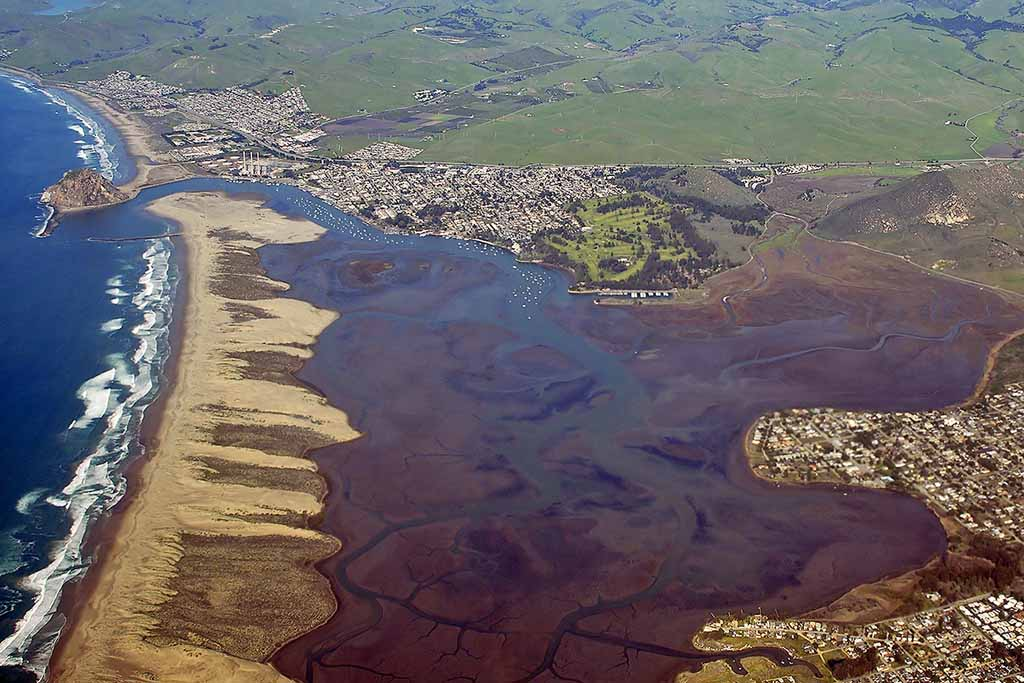
Morro Bay

Morro Bay is the name of the large estuary situated along the northern shores of the bay itself. The larger bay on which the local area lies is Estero Bay, which also encompasses the communities of Cayucos and Los Osos. It stretches from Montana de Oro State Park in the south to Point Estero north of Cayucos. The city of Morro Bay is 20 km (12 mi) northwest of San Luis Obispo and is located on Highway 1. Los Osos Creek discharges into Morro Bay.

According to the United States Census Bureau, the city has a total area of 10.3 square miles (26.7 km^{2}), of which 5.0 square miles (12.9 km^{2}) (48.41%) are covered by water.

=== Morro Rock ===
Morro Rock

Morro Rock is a 576-ft-high (176 m) volcanic plug located at the entrance to the harbor. The descriptive term morro is common to the Spanish, Portuguese, and Italian languages, and the word is part of many place names where a distinctive and prominent hill-shaped rock formation exists. Originally, it was surrounded by water, but the northern channel was filled in to make the harbor. It was quarried from 1889 to 1969, and in 1968, it was designated a Historical Landmark. The area around the base of Morro Rock is open to visitors, with parking lots and paths. Climbing the rock is prohibited due to risk of injury, and because it is a peregrine falcon reserve. Morro Rock is one in a series of similar plugs that stretch in a line inland called the Nine Sisters.

=== Morro Bay Harbor ===
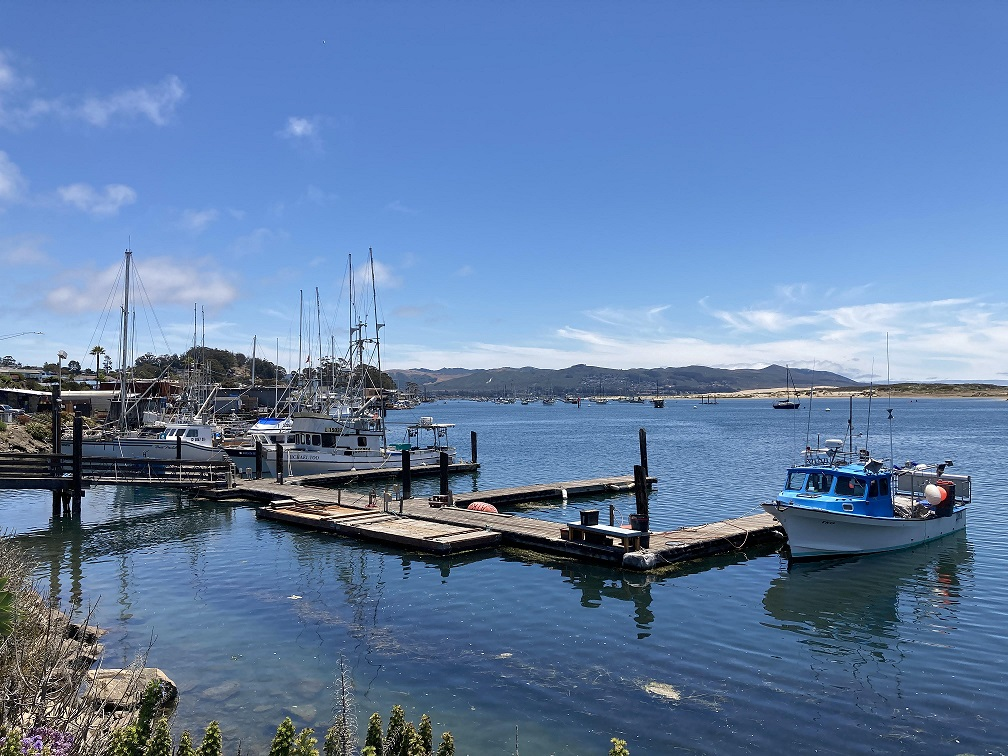
Morro Bay Harbor

Morro Bay is a natural embayment with an artificial harbor constructed by the US Army Corps of Engineers. It is the only all-weather, small-craft, commercial and recreational harbor between Santa Barbara and Monterey. Morro Rock was originally surrounded by water, but the Army built a large artificial breakwater and road across the north end of the harbor, linking Morro Rock and the mainland. Some of the rock used for this and for the artificial breakwaters was quarried from Morro Rock itself. Other rock was imported by barge from Catalina Island. The bay extends inland and parallels the shore for a distance of about 6.4 km (4.0 mi) south of its entrance at Morro Rock. Morro Bay is recognized for protection by the California Bays and Estuaries Policy. A small summer colony of otters usually can be seen in the kelp near the harbor entrance.

Past the working harbor area in the town of Morro Bay, the estuary extends southward toward the communities of Baywood and Los Osos and Montana De Oro State Park.

=== Black Hill ===
The next of the Nine Sisters closest to Morro Rock itself is Black Hill, sitting on the inland edge of the town of Morro Bay. There is a popular hiking trail to the top that gives excellent sunset views of Morro Rock, the town of Morro Bay, and the wider San Luis Valley.

=== Climate ===
Morro Bay experiences a mild warm-summer Mediterranean climate (Köppen Csb) characteristic of coastal California, featuring dry, warm summers and wet, mild winters. The city is located next to the Pacific Ocean, which helps moderate temperatures and create an overall pleasant, mild, year-round climate, resulting in warmer winters and cooler summers compared with places farther inland, such as Atascadero. Summers in Morro Bay are cool for a city located at 35°N latitude, with July averaging around 60 °F (16 °C). Winters are mild, with January averaging at 55 °F (13 °C) with around eight days of measurable precipitation.

Climate data for Morro Bay, CA (1991–2020 normals, extremes 1959–present)
Month	Jan	Feb	Mar	Apr	May	Jun	Jul	Aug	Sep	Oct	Nov	Dec	Year
Record high °F (°C)	89 (32)	87 (31)	92 (33)	100 (38)	98 (37)	86 (30)	92 (33)	94 (34)	101 (38)	106 (41)	92 (33)	81 (27)	106 (41)
Mean maximum °F (°C)	74.9 (23.8)	76.0 (24.4)	78.4 (25.8)	81.5 (27.5)	78.8 (26.0)	72.7 (22.6)	76.4 (24.7)	79.0 (26.1)	83.4 (28.6)	89.4 (31.9)	80.1 (26.7)	72.8 (22.7)	91.7 (33.2)
Mean daily maximum °F (°C)	65.1 (18.4)	65.4 (18.6)	66.0 (18.9)	67.3 (19.6)	66.9 (19.4)	66.4 (19.1)	67.2 (19.6)	69.7 (20.9)	71.5 (21.9)	72.5 (22.5)	69.1 (20.6)	64.6 (18.1)	67.6 (19.8)
Daily mean °F (°C)	55.7 (13.2)	56.6 (13.7)	57.3 (14.1)	58.3 (14.6)	59.3 (15.2)	60.0 (15.6)	61.8 (16.6)	63.2 (17.3)	63.7 (17.6)	63.5 (17.5)	59.7 (15.4)	55.4 (13.0)	59.5 (15.3)
Mean daily minimum °F (°C)	46.4 (8.0)	47.8 (8.8)	48.6 (9.2)	49.2 (9.6)	51.7 (10.9)	53.6 (12.0)	56.5 (13.6)	56.8 (13.8)	56.0 (13.3)	54.4 (12.4)	50.2 (10.1)	46.2 (7.9)	51.5 (10.8)
Mean minimum °F (°C)	36.2 (2.3)	36.3 (2.4)	38.7 (3.7)	39.2 (4.0)	43.1 (6.2)	45.6 (7.6)	50.0 (10.0)	49.9 (9.9)	48.2 (9.0)	44.6 (7.0)	39.1 (3.9)	34.9 (1.6)	32.6 (0.3)
Record low °F (°C)	23 (−5)	22 (−6)	28 (−2)	31 (−1)	33 (1)	39 (4)	40 (4)	40 (4)	41 (5)	36 (2)	31 (−1)	22 (−6)	22 (−6)
Average precipitation inches (mm)	3.64 (92)	3.62 (92)	3.19 (81)	0.99 (25)	0.42 (11)	0.20 (5.1)	0.07 (1.8)	0.02 (0.51)	0.09 (2.3)	0.68 (17)	1.33 (34)	2.75 (70)	17.00 (432)
Average precipitation days (≥ 0.01 in)	7.0	8.2	7.0	4.1	1.8	0.4	0.4	0.3	0.7	2.1	3.4	6.9	42.3
Source: NOAA

=== Nature preserves ===
Morro Dunes Ecological Reserve

Near Morro Bay there are a number of state and locally-protected nature preserves, including Montana De Oro State Park, Morro Bay State Park, Morro Strand State Beach, Morro Dunes Ecological Reserve, Morro Bay State Marine Reserve/ State Marine Recreational Management Area, and Los Osos Oaks State Natural Reserve.

== Demographics ==
Historical population
Census	Pop.	Note	%±
1950	1,659		—
1960	3,692		122.5%
1970	7,109		92.6%
1980	9,064		27.5%
1990	9,664		6.6%
2000	10,350		7.1%
2010	10,234		−1.1%
2020	10,757		5.1%
U.S. Decennial Census

=== 2020 census ===
As of the 2020 census, Morro Bay had a population of 10,757 and a population density of 2,019.3 inhabitants per square mile (779.7/km^{2}). The age distribution was 13.2% under the age of 18, 5.6% aged 18 to 24, 20.4% aged 25 to 44, 28.0% aged 45 to 64, and 32.8% who were 65 years of age or older. The median age was 54.6 years. For every 100 females, there were 91.8 males, and for every 100 females age 18 and over, there were 90.8 males age 18 and over.

The census reported that 96.7% of the population lived in households, 1.9% lived in non-institutionalized group quarters, and 1.3% were institutionalized. 98.6% of residents lived in urban areas, while 1.4% lived in rural areas.

There were 5,038 households, of which 17.7% had children under the age of 18 living in them. Of all households, 42.6% were married-couple households, 7.0% were cohabiting couple households, 30.2% had a female householder with no spouse or partner present, and 20.1% had a male householder with no spouse or partner present. About 35.3% of households were made up of individuals, and 20.2% had someone living alone who was 65 years of age or older. The average household size was 2.07. There were 2,848 families (56.5% of all households).

There were 6,528 housing units at an average density of 1,225.5 units per square mile (473.2 units/km^{2}). Of these, 5,038 (77.2%) were occupied and 22.8% were vacant. Of occupied housing units, 56.3% were owner-occupied and 43.7% were occupied by renters. The homeowner vacancy rate was 1.5% and the rental vacancy rate was 4.3%.

Racial composition as of the 2020 census
Race	Number	Percent
White	8,428	78.3%
Black or African American	84	0.8%
American Indian and Alaska Native	73	0.7%
Asian	322	3.0%
Native Hawaiian and Other Pacific Islander	22	0.2%
Some other race	677	6.3%
Two or more races	1,151	10.7%
Hispanic or Latino (of any race)	1,788	16.6%

=== 2023 ACS estimates ===
In 2023, the US Census Bureau estimated that 5.8% of the population were foreign-born. Of all people aged 5 or older, 89.4% spoke only English at home, 6.1% spoke Spanish, 3.4% spoke other Indo-European languages, 0.8% spoke Asian or Pacific Islander languages, and 0.3% spoke other languages. Of those aged 25 or older, 93.9% were high school graduates and 46.4% had a bachelor's degree.

The median household income in 2023 was $92,553, and the per capita income was $59,411. About 5.7% of families and 9.9% of the population were below the poverty line.

=== 2010 census ===
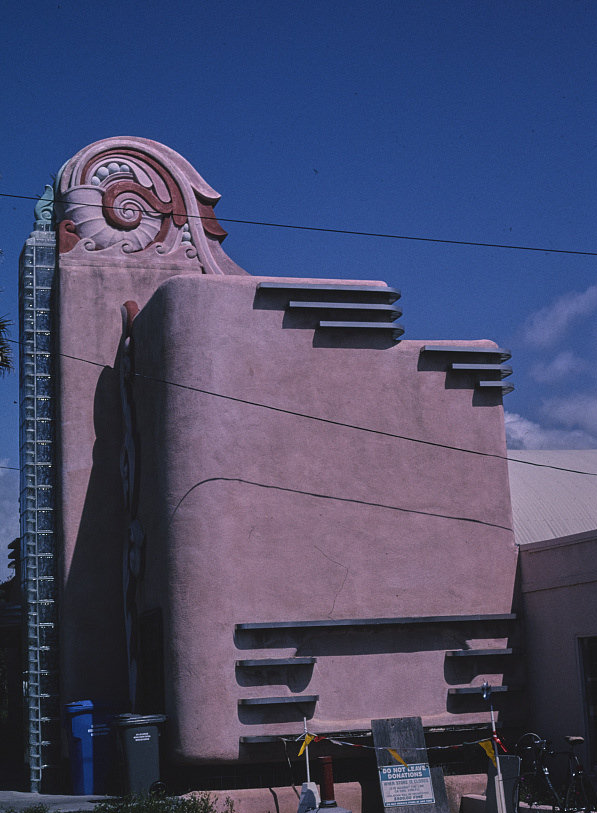
Antique shop in Morro Bay

The 2010 United States census reported that Morro Bay had a population of 10,234. The population density was 991.5 inhabitants per square mile (382.8/km^{2}). The racial makeup of Morro Bay was 87.1% White, 0.4% African American, 0.9% Native American, 2.5% Asian, 0.1% Pacific Islander, 6.0% from other races, and 3.0% from two or more races. About 14.9% of the residents were Hispanics or Latinos of any race. The census reported that 98.4% of the population lived in households, 0.4% lived in noninstitutionalized group quarters, and 1.2% were institutionalized.

Of the 4,844 households, 19.0% had children under 18 living in them, 40.7% were opposite-sex married couples living together, 8.4% had a female householder with no husband present, and 4.5% had a male householder with no wife present; 6.8% were unmarried opposite-sex partnerships, and 0.7% were same-sex married couples or partnerships. Of the 1,808 households, 37.3% were made up of individuals and 16.2% had someone living alone who was 65 or older. The average household size was 2.08. About 53.6% of all households were families; the average family size was 2.70.

The city's age distribution was 15.0% under 18, 8.0% from 18 to 24, 22.1% from 25 to 44, 31.3% from 45 to 64, and 23.7% who were 65 or older. The median age was 48.9 years. For every 100 females, there were 95.8 males. For every 100 females 18 and over, there were 93.6 males.

The 6,320 housing units had an average density of 612.3 units per square mile (236.4 units/km^{2}), of which 53.3% were owner-occupied and 46.7% were occupied by renters. The homeowner vacancy rate was 3.3%; the rental vacancy rate was 6.3%. About 51.0% of the population lived in owner-occupied housing units and 47.4% lived in rental housing units.

Morro Bay High School, Los Osos Middle School, and Del Mar Elementary offer education for grades 9-12, grades 6-8, and kindergarten through grade 5, respectively.

== Economy ==
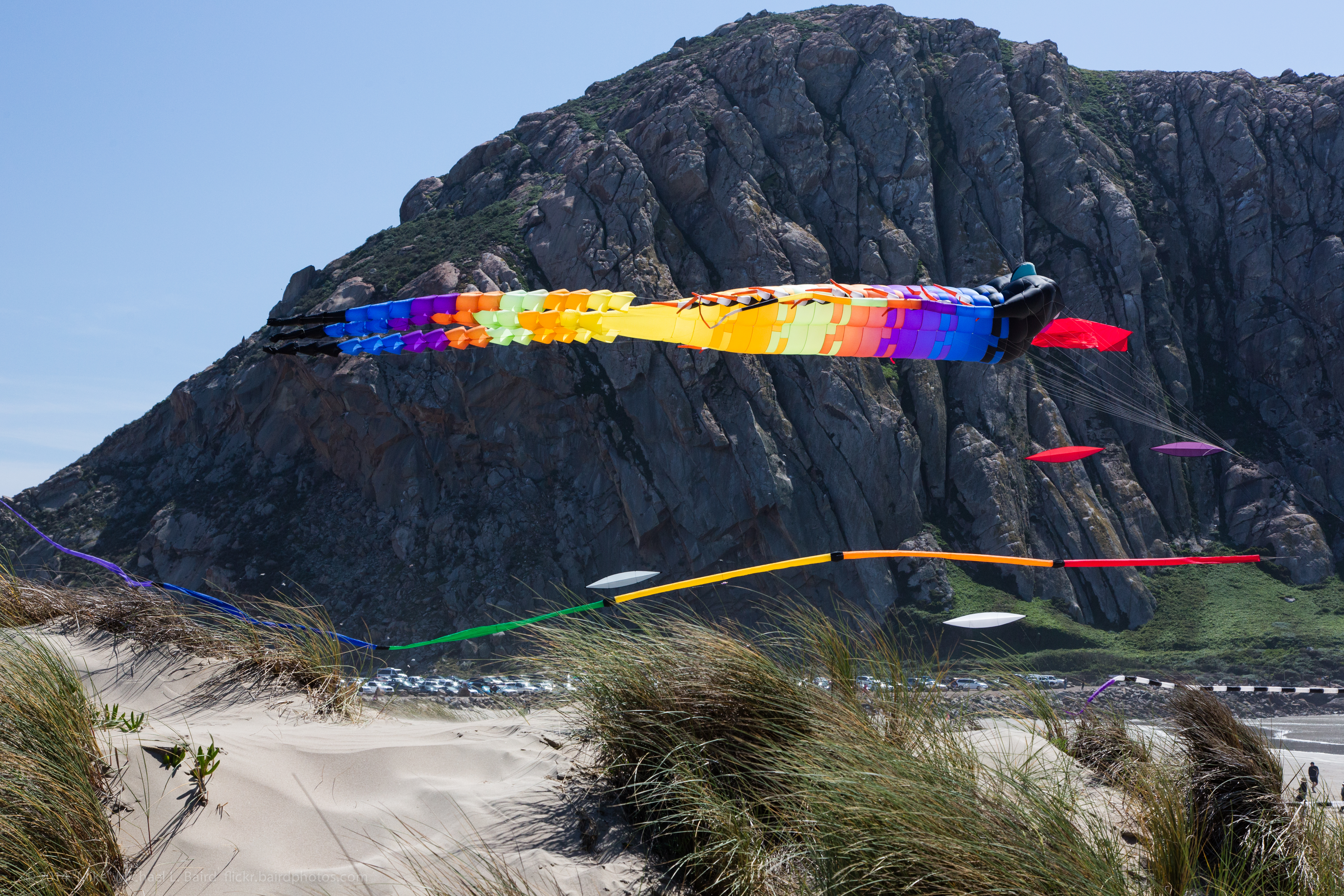
Morro Bay Kite Festival

Tourism is the city's largest industry, coexisting with the town's commercial fishery. A number of tourist attractions are found along the shoreline and the streets closest to it, especially the Embarcadero, including restaurants, shops and parks. Further, hospitality is the cornerstone of Morro Bay's economy. The city heavily relies on visitors staying at hotels, as tax revenues from those stays make up a significant portion of the city's General Fund. The importance of travelers staying in hotels is solidified by the number and variety of accommodations. Hotels, motels, and inns within Morro Bay continuously adapt to accommodate visitors by investing in their amenities, accommodations, and conditions.

The most popular beach is on the north side of Morro Rock, north of the harbor. Also, excellent beaches are found north and south of the town, at Morro Strand State Beach and Morro Bay State Park, respectively.

=== Power plant ===
Morro Bay power plant circa 2026

The power plant has played a large role in Morro Bay, and in providing electricity to the Central Coast and the Central Valley of California (primarily Fresno and Bakersfield). It was built by PG&E in the mid-1950s to a design by architect William Gladstone Merchant, and was expanded in the 1960s. A portion of the city's budget came from taxes on the natural gas the plant burned. In 1997, PG&E sold the plant to Duke Energy under a state law requiring energy producers to reduce their assets.

The 650-megawatt plant employed more than 100 workers at its peak and operated around the clock during the energy crisis of 2000, but by the mid-2010s, when it was owned by Dynegy, it had become uneconomical and was operating at 5% of capacity, primarily during periods of peak energy demand. It would have required expensive upgrades by 2015 to conform to state law. Duke had proposed modernizing the plant by converting it to combined cycle power generation, but the modernization was not carried out, and Dynegy closed the plant in February 2014.

In 2018, a joint venture of German energy company EnBW and Seattle-based Trident Winds announced its plan to obtain the power plant's grid connection to connect a 650 MW floating offshore wind park comprising up to 100 floating wind turbines and a floating substation situated some 30 miles (48 km) off the coast. In 2022, TotalEnergies, a French energy company, entered the joint venture with Trident Winds and took over the shares previously held by EnBW.

In 2021, the city council of Morro Bay voted 4–1 to take down the power plant's smokestacks by 2028. The city estimated that maintaining the smoke stacks would cost around a million dollars per year. Vistra Energy, which had purchased Dynegy, agreed to tear down the stacks and plans to build a 600 MW lithium-ion battery installation.

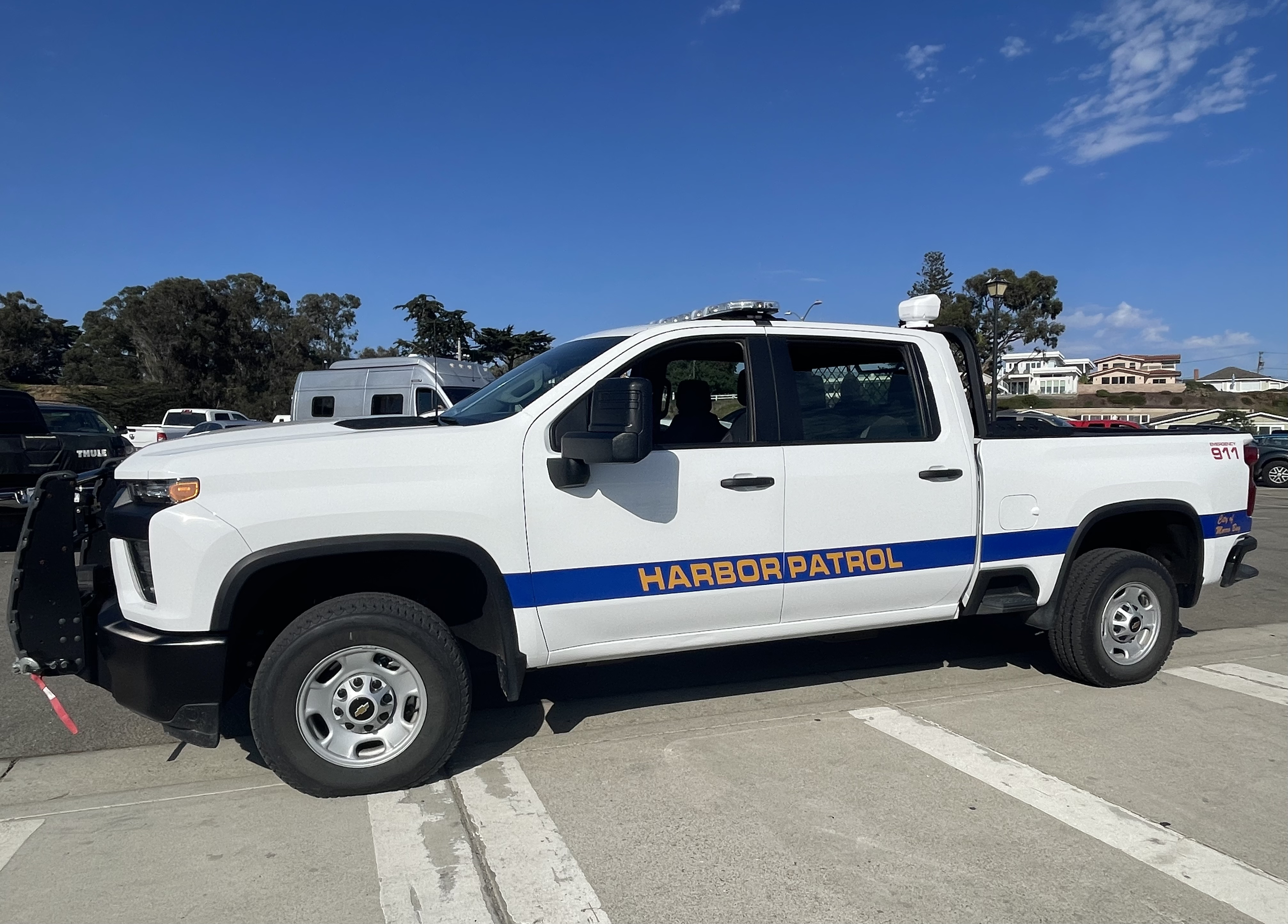
Morro Bay Harbor Patrol vehicle in 2023.

Morro Bay city government has struggled to decide on a plan for the power plant site that residents will support. In 2023, they hired outside consultants Rincon Consulting Inc. to conduct a study of proposed land use and resident opinions. In 2025, current owners of the site Vistra Corporation rejected a City proposal to purchase the site.

== Government ==
Morro Bay City Hall

Morro Bay is an incorporated city within the County of San Luis Obispo. It has a Council-Manager municipal structure, with one directly-elected mayor and four additional city council members.

In the California State Legislature, Morro Bay is in the 17th senatorial district, represented by Democrat John Laird, and in the 30th Assembly district, represented by Democrat Dawn Addis.

In the United States House of Representatives, Morro Bay is in California's 24th congressional district, which has a Cook PVI of D +4 and is represented by Salud Carbajal (D–Santa Barbara).

=== Library ===
Morro Bay Library

The San Luis Obispo County Library system operates a branch library in Morro Bay, located across the street from city hall on the corner of Harbor Street and Shasta Avenue.

== Education ==
Morro Bay is served by the San Luis Coastal Unified School District.

== Notable people ==
- James Horvath, children's author and illustrator
- Jack LaLanne, American fitness, exercise, nutritional expert and motivational speaker
- Jerome Long, NFL defensive lineman
- Kent Nagano, conductor and opera administrator, grew up in Morro Bay and graduated from Morro Bay High School
- Mel Queen, professional baseball player, coach, scout and executive
- Billy Bob Thornton, actor and musician
- Gladys Walton, silent film actress

== In popular culture ==
- Morro Bay served as the primary setting for Pixar's 2016 film Finding Dory, in which it was revealed that Dory's childhood home was the Marine Life Institute, known as "The Jewel of Morro Bay, California".
- The 2002 film Murder by Numbers was filmed on the Morro Bay Embarcadero, as well as in Los Osos and San Luis Obispo.
- The track scenes in the 1982 film Personal Best were filmed at Morro Bay High School, with other filming throughout San Luis Obispo County.

== See also ==
- USCGC Morro Bay
