= Morro Rock =

Volcanic plug in Morro Bay, California, United States

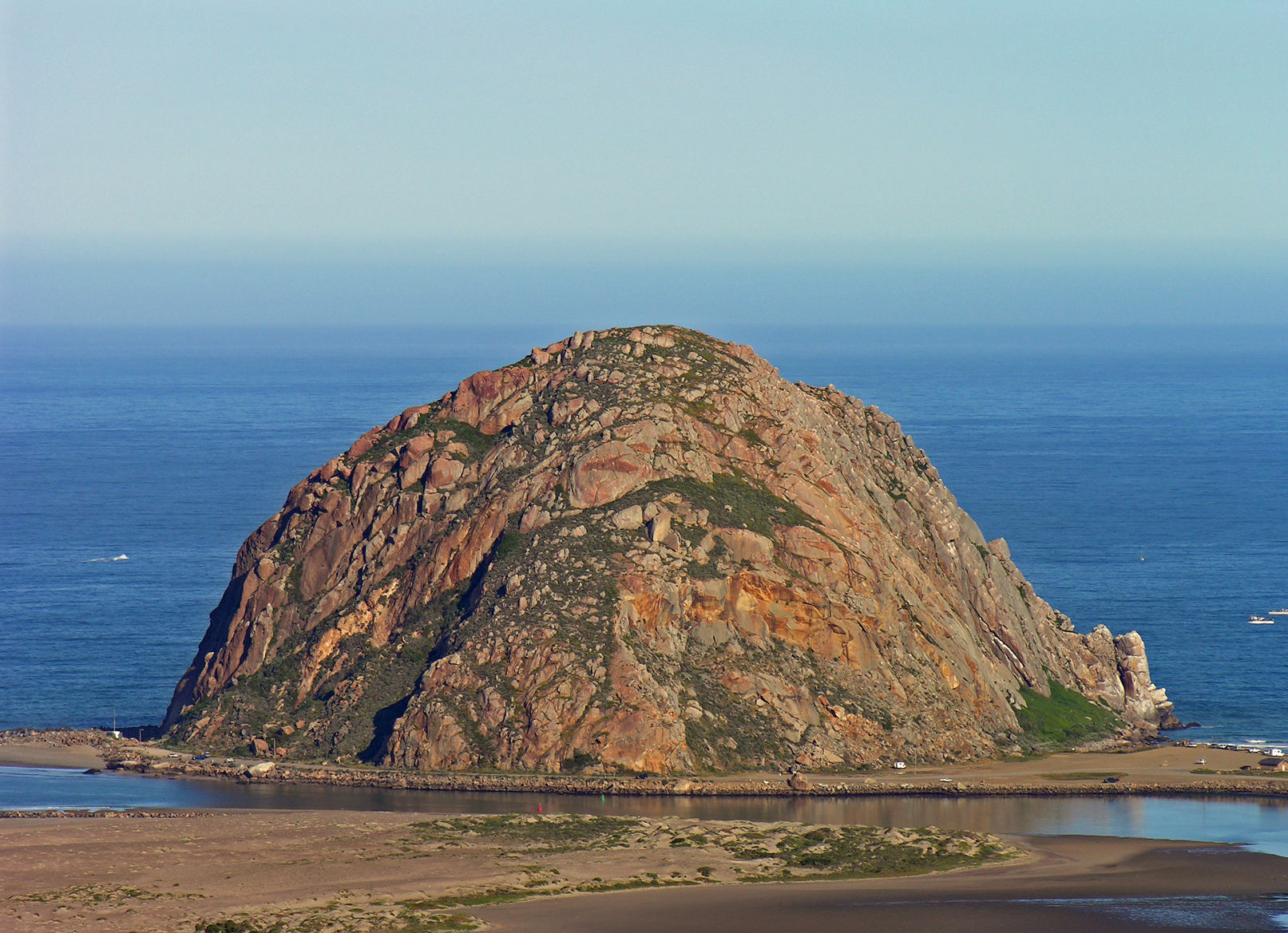
- Morro Rock looking west

Highest point
- Elevation: 581 ft (177 m) NAVD 88
- Coordinates: 35°22′10″N 120°52′03″W

Geography
- Location within California Location within the United States
- Location: California
- Parent range: Santa Lucia Range
- Topo map: USGS Morro Bay South

Geology
- Rock age: c. 23 million years
- Mountain type: Volcanic plug
- Volcanic zone: Nine Sisters

California Historical Landmark
- Designated: January 1, 1968
- Reference no.: 821

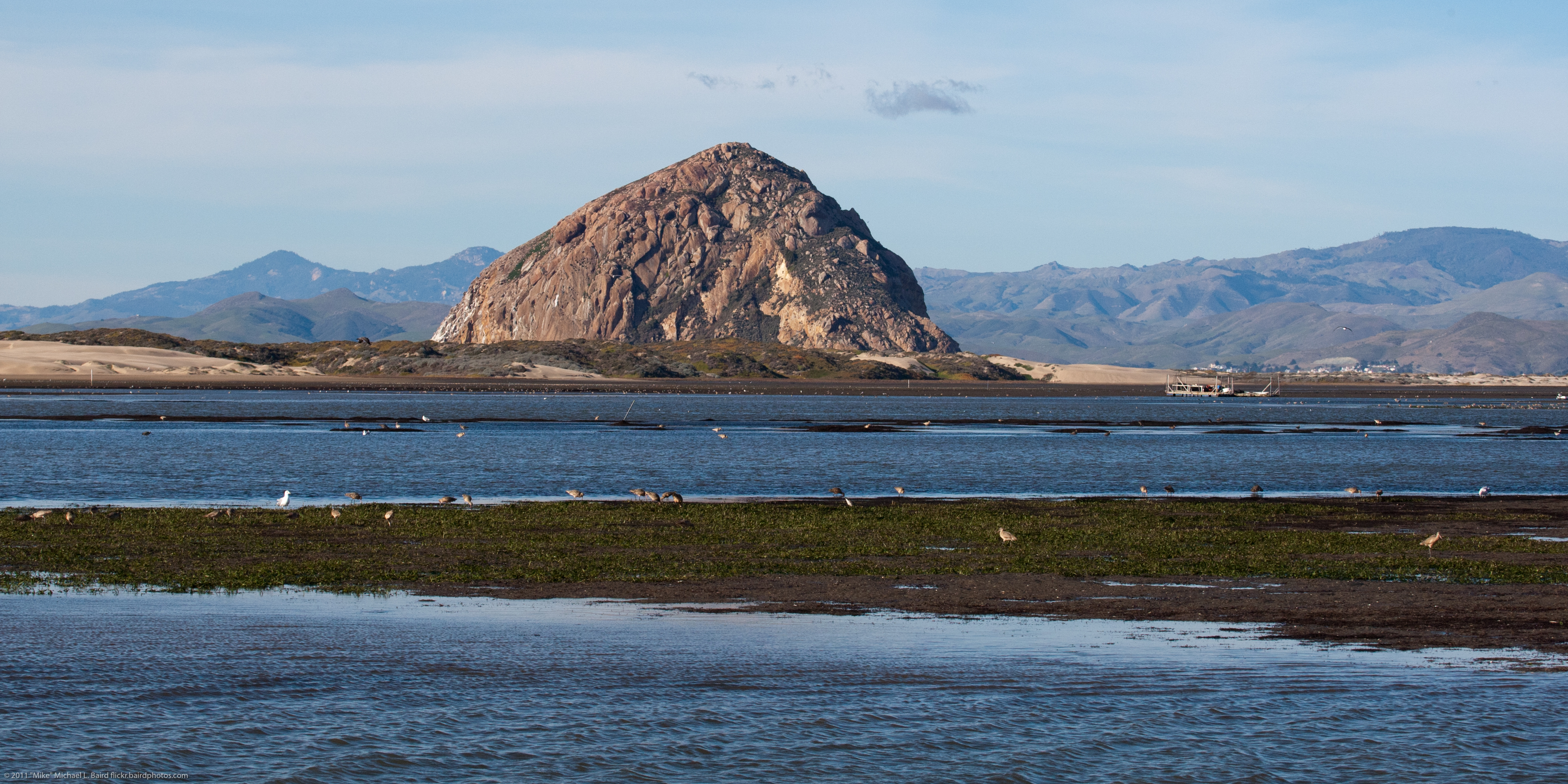
Photo from offshore at low tide

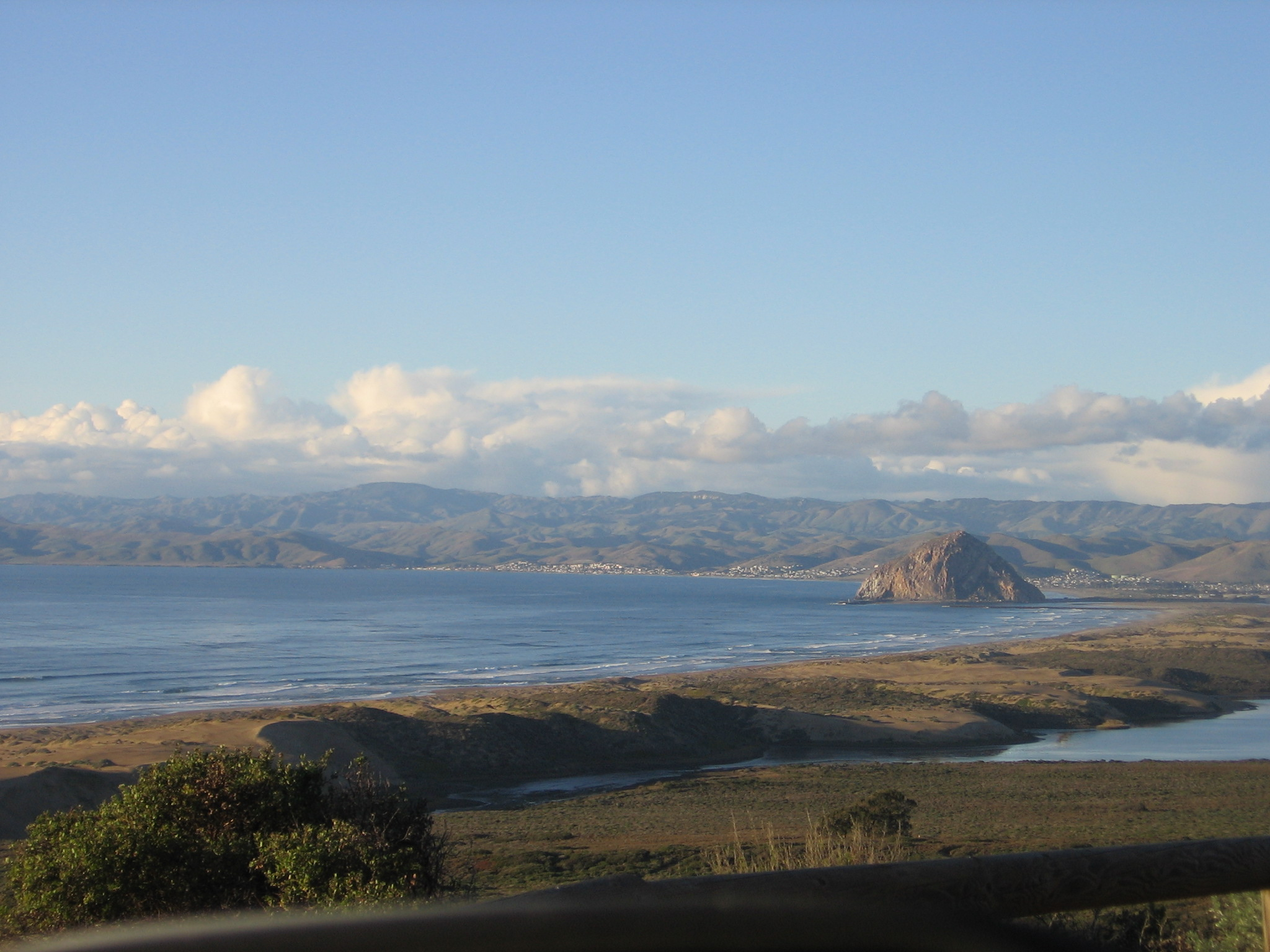
The south side of Morro Rock from the entrance of Montaña de Oro State Park

Morro Rock (Salinan: Le'samo; Chumash: Lisamu'; Spanish: El Morro) is a volcanic plug in Morro Bay, California, the Pacific Coast at the entrance to Morro Bay harbor. A causeway connects it with the shore, making it a tied island. The rock is protected as the Morro Rock State Preserve.

== Geology ==
The 581-foot (177 m) Morro Rock is one of 13 volcanic plugs (remnant necks of extinct volcanoes), lava domes, and sheetlike intrusions between Morro Bay on the north and Islay Hill on the south, all in San Luis Obispo County.

It is composed mostly of dacite, an igneous, volcanic rock. It is a groundmass of plagioclase, with amphibole (hornblende), biotite, pyroxene (augite), quartz, and glass; it also includes phenocrysts of plagioclase. Its silicon dioxide (SiO2) content ranges from 63 to 69 percent.

The dacite volcanic plugs, lava domes, intrusive sheets, and felsitic rhyolite-dacite between Morro Rock and Islay Hill are part of the Morro Rock-Islay Hill Complex of the Oligocene epoch (from 27 to 23 million years ago). The complex lies east of the San Gregorio-San Simeon-Hosgri fault (the SG-SS-H fault). This complex is one of three probable sources of the volcanic clasts within the sandstone and conglomerate of the Miguelito and Edna members of the Pismo Formation in the Point Sur area 145–160 km (90–99 mi) to the north and west of the SG-SS-H fault. Based on paleomagnetic signatures, the Morro Rock-Islay Hill Complex was rotated 40 to 50 degrees, perhaps during late Miocene or early Pliocene time.

== History ==
=== Tribal ===
The Salinan and Chumash tribes consider Morro Rock to be a sacred site. The Salinan name for Morro Rock is Le'samo and the Chumash name is Lisamu.

The Chumash had an important nearby prehistoric settlement at least as early as the Millingstone Horizon (6500-2000 B.C.E.), and the village was near the mouth of Morro Creek, at the current site of Morro Bay High School. The right of the Salinan people to climb Morro Rock for their biannual solstice ceremonies has been established, in which they celebrate the time in legend when a hawk and a raven destroyed a two-headed serpent-monster Taliyekatapelta as he wrapped his body around the base of the rock. The established Salinan right to climb the rock has been in legal dispute by the local Chumash tribe, which claims that Morro Rock is Chumash, not Salinan, territory. The Chumash also believe that the rock is so sacred that it should never be climbed. Because of its fragility, it is illegal for the general public to climb it.

=== European sighting ===
Morro Rock was probably seen by Spanish maritime explorers as early as 1542 under Juan Rodríguez Cabrillo, but its current name was given during the first European land exploration of Alta California. The Spanish Portolá expedition came down Los Osos Valley and camped near today's Morro Bay on September 8, 1769. Franciscan missionary and expedition member Juan Crespí noted in his diary that "we saw a great rock in the form of a round mountain (Spanish:morro)".

=== Quarry and historical landmark ===
The rock, which was quarried on and off from 1889 to 1969, provided material for the breakwater of Morro Bay and the improvements at Port San Luis Harbor. In 1966, a state law was adopted that transferred title to the State of California. In February 1968, the San Luis Obispo County Historical Society and the City of Morro Bay succeeded in having Morro Rock declared California Historical Landmark number 821.

== Flora and fauna ==
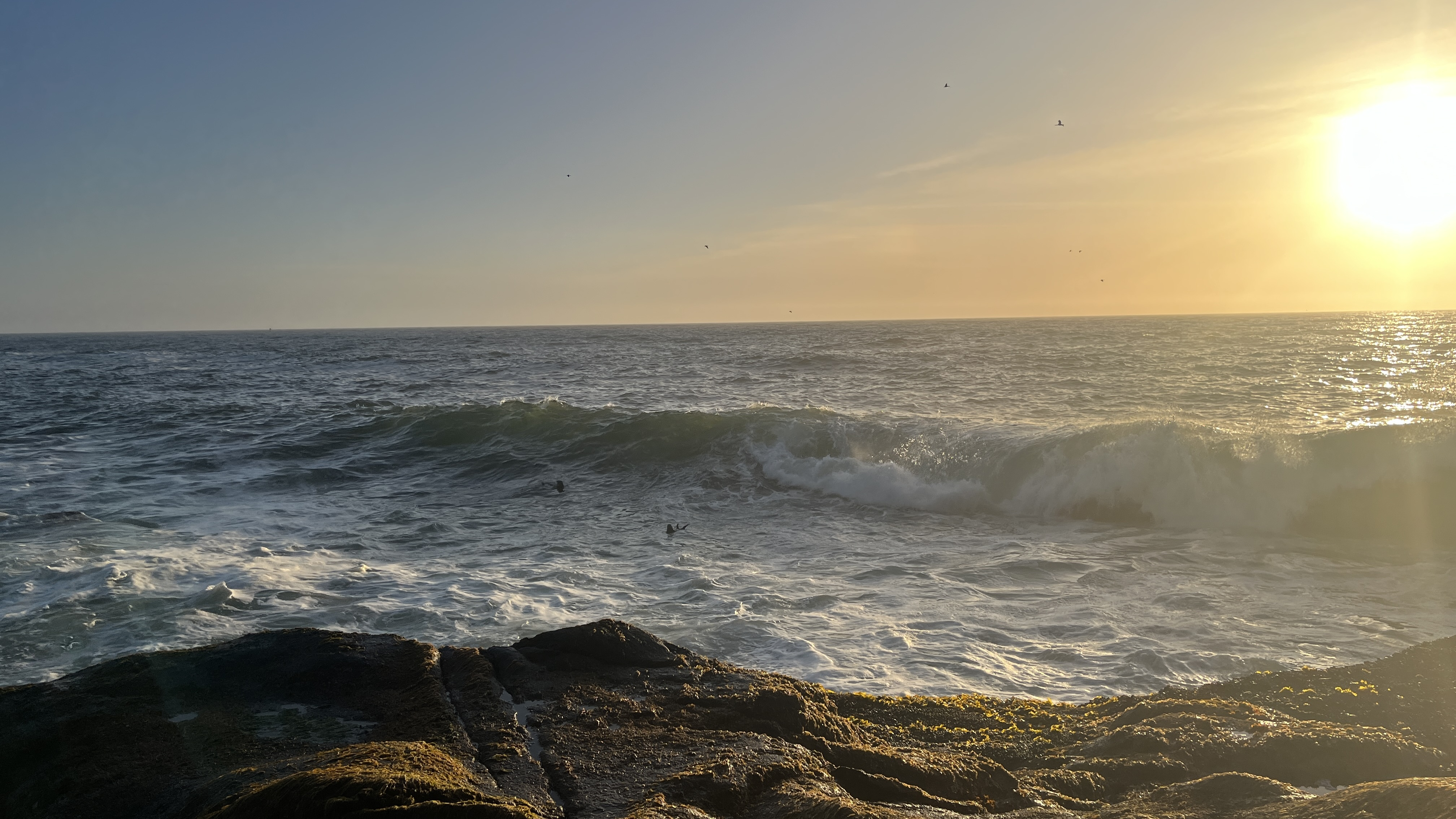
Sea lions float in the water near Morro Rock

Several types of birds nest on Morro Rock, including three cormorant species and two gull species. It presently serves as a reserve for peregrine falcons, which are locally endangered and cause most of the laws that prohibit intervention with avian life.

Sea lions and sea otters can be seen regularly in the water around the rock. Seals, however, are much more common in the nearby Morro Bay State Park, where they breed.

Other fauna include a wide selection of tide pool animals, like hermit crabs, small fish, starfish, sea cucumbers, mussels, bivalve mollusks, coral, and more.

On land few flora can survive the harsh, dry environment on the rock, but in the surrounding bay, kelp, sea grass, kelp forest plants, and tide pool plants can survive, and a few common grasses, mosses, lichens and weeds from the mainland take root on the rock itself.

== Marine protected areas ==
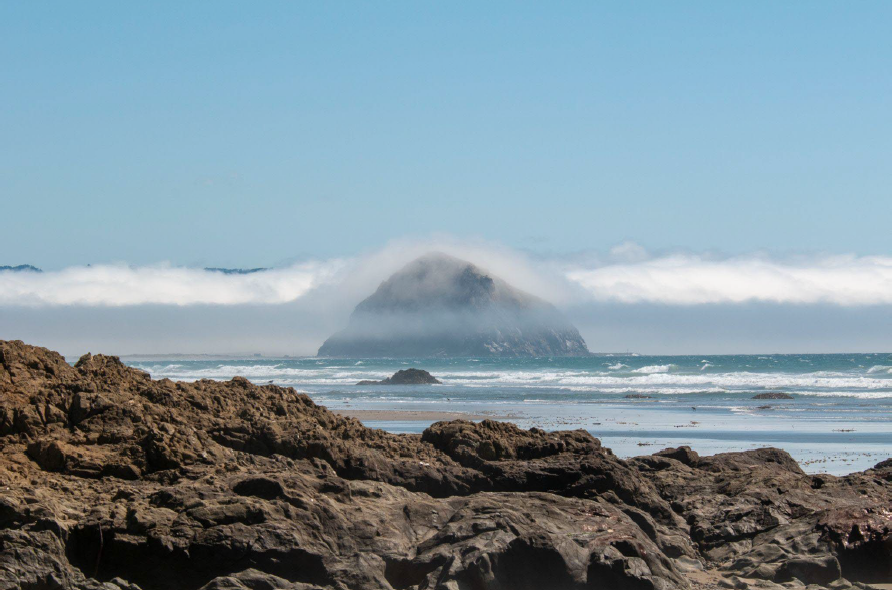
Morro Rock

Morro Bay State Marine Recreational Management Area and Morro Bay State Marine Reserve are protected areas offshore from Morro Bay. Like underwater parks, protected areas help conserve ocean wildlife and marine ecosystems.

== In popular culture ==
In Cyberpunk 2077, where Morro Bay is home to the independent city-state of Night City, Morro Rock has been demolished in order to build Night City International and Translunar Spaceport (NCX) between 2045 and 2047.

== See also ==
- List of beaches in California
- List of California state parks
