= Los Osos Valley =

Valley in San Luis Obispo County

Coordinates: 35.2500°N 120.6833°W

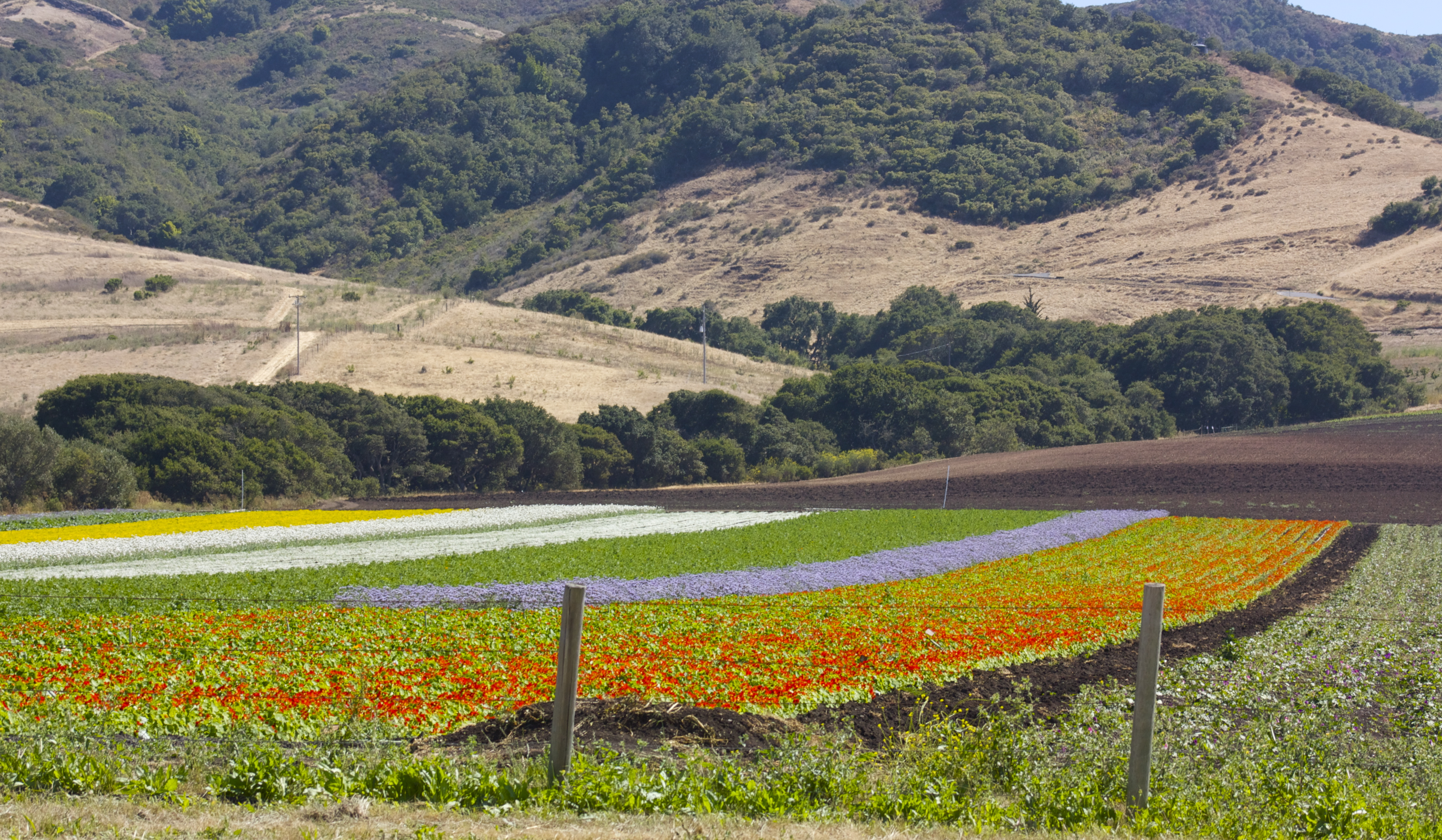
Flower fields in Los Osos Valley

The Los Osos Valley is a valley within San Luis Obispo County, in the Central Coast of California region.

== Geography ==
Los Osos Valley lies between southern San Luis Obispo and Baywood-Los Osos. The town of Los Osos is in the valley.

The Irish Hills are along the south side, and five of the Nine Sisters volcanic mountains are along the north.

Los Osos Creek flows through the valley to its mouth on southern Morro Bay.

== History ==
A prehistoric human habitation site was found at Los Osos Back Bay in the Los Osos Valley, of ancient Chumash tribe.

The Portolá expedition passed through the valley in 1769, as recorded by padre Juan Crespí. The valley became part of the lands of the Mission San Luis Obispo in 1772.

Victor Linares was granted mission lands in the valley that became the Rancho Cañada de los Osos on December 1, 1842, by Governor Juan B. Alvarado. The rancho lay west of San Luis Obispo to Morro Bay in the Los Osos Valley, between the Irish Hills to the south and the Nine Sisters to the north. In 1844, Victor Linares sold his rancho to James Scott and John Wilson who also bought the adjacent Rancho Pecho y Islay a strip of Pacific coastal terrace and the Irish Hills bordering the terrace from Pecho Creek to the east and Islay Creek to the north. Scott and Wilson added it to their Los Osos rancho and combined them in a new 32,431 acre grant, Rancho Cañada de los Osos y Pecho y Islay from Governor Pio Pico in 1845.

== Parks ==
The Los Osos Oaks State Natural Reserve preserves centuries-old Coast live oaks (Quercus agrifolia) growing atop relict sand dunes in the valley, just outside Los Osos.

The Elfin Forest Natural Area is on the south side of Los Osos Creek's mouth on Morro Bay.

A bear population is centered in the Los Padres National Forest some 10 miles (16 km) away with bears occasionally wandering into the valley.

== See also ==
- California oak woodland
