= Elfin Forest =

Elfin forest or dwarf forest is a type of ecosystem featuring miniature trees.

Elfin forest may also refer to:

- Elfin Forest, California, unincorporated community in San Diego County, California
- Elfin Forest Natural Area in San Luis Obispo County, California
