= Kathleen Burke Hale =

British-American war worker (1887–1958)

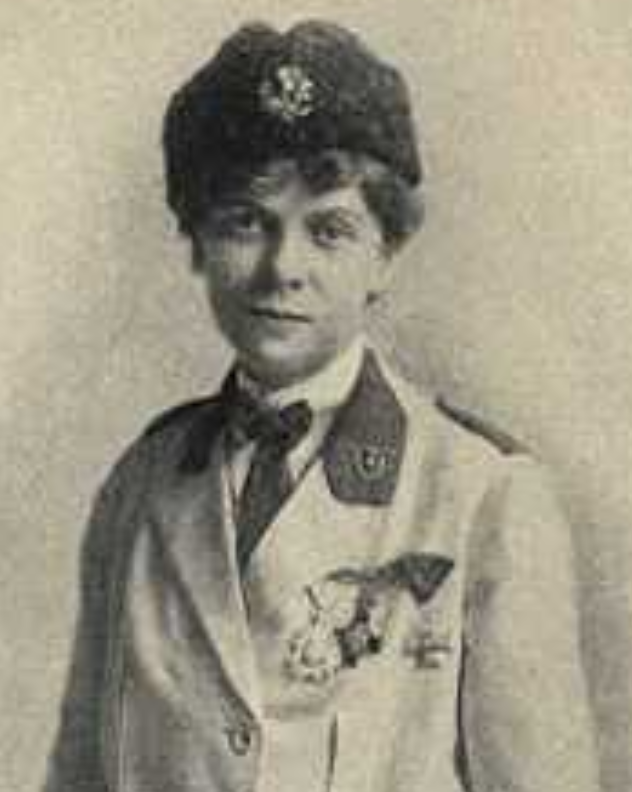
- Kathleen Burke, from her 1916 book The White Road to Verdun
- Born: Kathleen Burke; 24 October 1887; London
- Died: 26 November 1958 (aged 71); New York
- Other name: Kathleen Burke Peabody
- Occupation: Philanthropist
- Spouse(s): Frederick Forrest Peabody; John Reginald McLean; Girard Van Barkaloo Hale
- Awards: Legion of Honour – (1918)

Kathleen Burke Peabody McLean Hale CBE (24 October 1887 – 26 November 1958) was a British-American philanthropist and war worker, decorated by seven European nations for her volunteer work during World War I and World War II.

== Early life ==
Kathleen Burke was born in London, the daughter of Thomas Francis Burke and Georgina Connolly Burke. Her father was a railway executive. She qualified to study at Oxford, and also studied at the Sorbonne as a young woman.

== Career ==
=== World War I ===
Burke was honorary secretary of the London Office of the Scottish Women's Hospitals during World War I. She raised funds and visited hospital units; she was the first woman to enter Verdun. She was decorated by seven European nations for her volunteer activities, including a British Victory Medal and CBE (1918), membership in the French Légion d'honneur, a Serbian Knighthood of Saint Sava, and a Russian Cross of St. George. She was also made an honorary colonel in the United States Army. She met all three of her future husbands during this period.

Burke wrote about her war experiences in The White Road to Verdun, and gave talks about her war experiences for community groups.

=== Between the wars ===
With her first husband Burke worked to rebuild Santa Barbara after its devastating 1925 earthquake; a high school stadium was named in recognition of their work. She was made an honorary member of the local metal workers' union in gratitude for her efforts. She was active in supporting many civic organizations in Santa Barbara, including the hospital, the public library, the Lobero Theatre, the Humane Society, the Junior League and scouting organizations.

=== World War II and after ===
Hale and her third husband worked on refugee resettlement in France until the Nazi occupation; then they focused on British war relief efforts. "This is a different kind of war," she told The New York Times in 1940, "but the human needs are the same." After the war, they funded the rebuilding of a French village, Maillé. Eleanor Roosevelt mentioned their project in her newspaper column, "My Day."

== Personal life and legacy ==
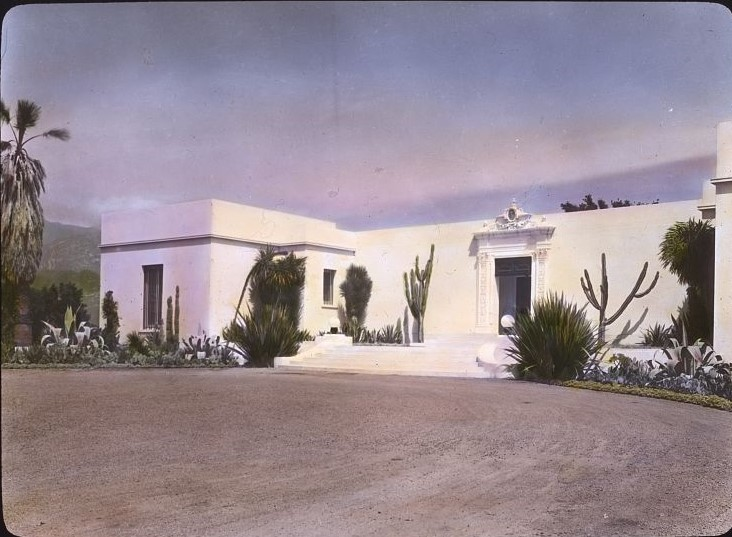
"Solana," Frederick Forrest Peabody house, Eucalyptus Hill Road, Montecito, California. Entrance Drive

Kathleen Burke married three times. Her first husband was manufacturer Frederick Forrest Peabody; they married in 1920 and he died in 1927. She was only briefly married to her second husband, John Reginald McLean, in 1929; he died in a car accident nine days after their wedding. In 1930 she married her third husband, diplomat Girard Van Barkaloo Hale. They lived in Montecito. She died in 1958, a month after her third husband, in New York. There is a large collection of her papers in the Santa Barbara Historical Museum's Gledhill Library.

Her home in Montecito, Villa Solana, became the headquarters of the Fund for the Republic, and its successor, the Center for the Study of Democratic Institutions. Her property Eagle Ranch near Atascadero remains a wildlife preserve, administered by the Land Conservancy of San Luis Obispo County. In 2017, "De Santa Barbara à Maillé... les Hale, 1886–1958" was an exhibit about Hale and her third husband, at the historical museum in Maillé.
