= Irish Hills (California) =

- Location within California Location within the United States

Highest point
- Elevation: 425 m (1,394 ft)

Geography
- Country: United States
- State: California
- Region: California Coast Ranges
- District: San Luis Obispo County
- Range coordinates: 35°14′15.910″N 120°46′49.635″W
- Topo map: USGS Port San Luis

The Irish Hills are a low mountain range of the southern outer California Coast Ranges in western San Luis Obispo County, California and the state's Central Coast region.

It rises between San Luis Obispo and the Pacific Ocean, south of Los Osos Valley Road to Morro Bay.

== Ecology ==
The hills support seasonally verdant non-native grasslands, with native chaparral and oak woodland habitats.

Los Osos Oaks State Natural Reserve lies on the northwestern slope, near the community of Los Osos.
