= Estero Bay =

Estero Bay may refer to:

- Estero Bay (California), U.S.
- Estero Bay (Florida), U.S.
