= Dwarf forest =

Type of forest ecosystem

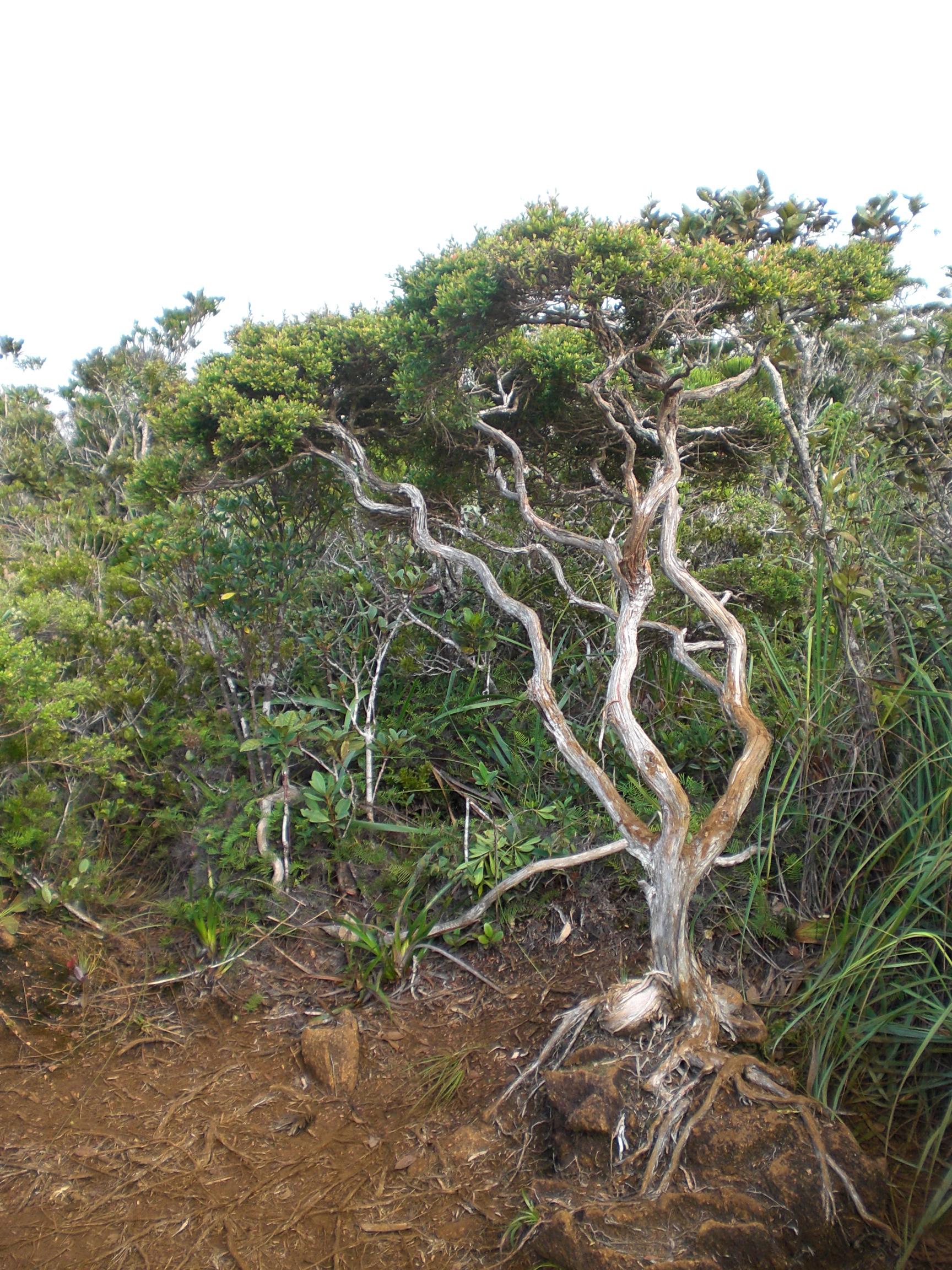
A "natural bonsai" in the Mount Hamiguitan National Park in the Philippines, a UNESCO World Heritage Site

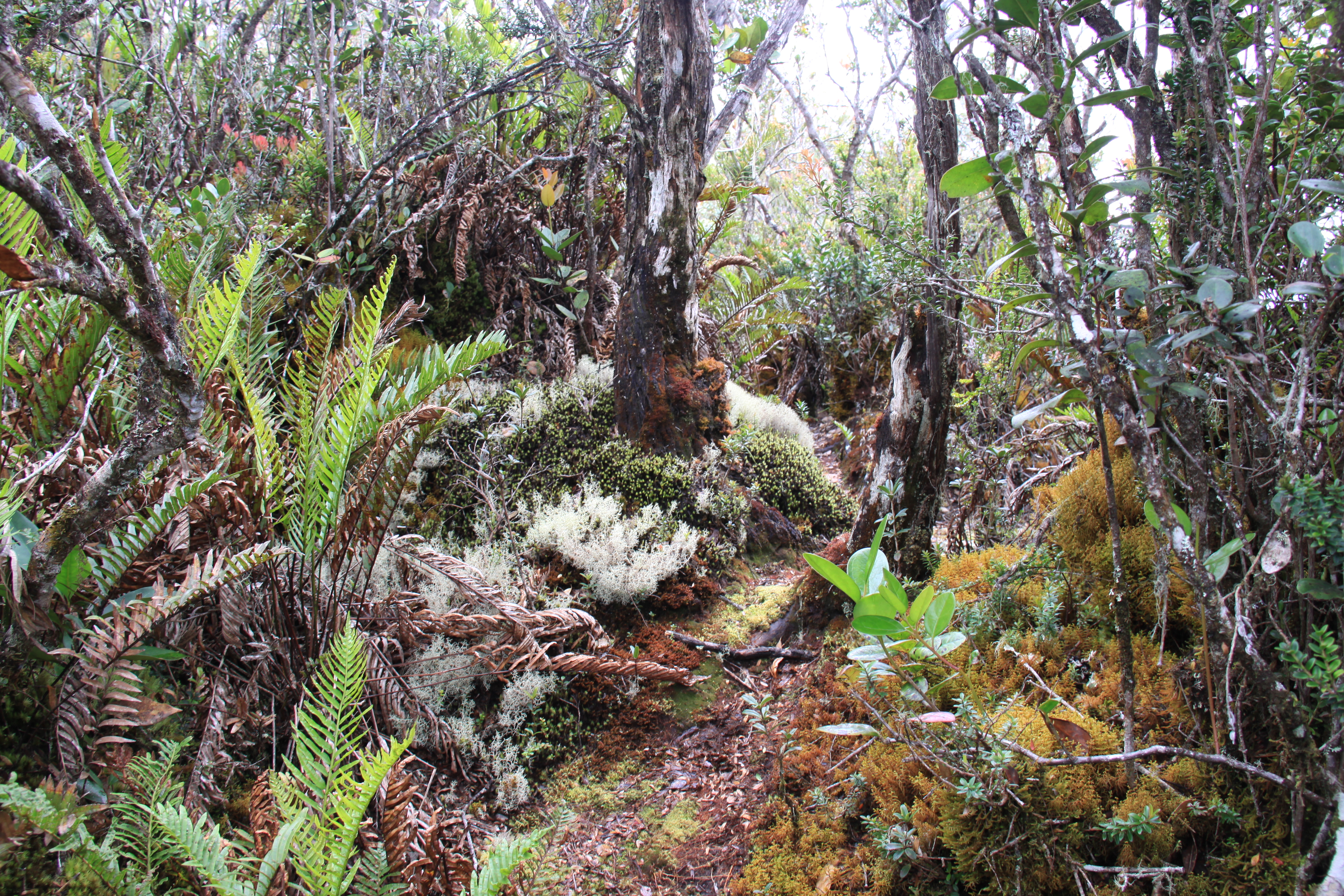
An elfin forest in Sumatra's Gunung Leuser National Park

Dwarf forest, elfin forest, or pygmy forest is an uncommon ecosystem featuring miniature trees, inhabited by small species of fauna such as rodents and lizards. They are usually located at high elevations, under conditions of sufficient air humidity but poor soil. Two main dwarf forest ecosystem types exist, involving different species and environmental characteristics: coastal temperate and montane tropical regions. Temperate coastal dwarf forest is common for parts of Southern California. Montane tropical forests are found across tropical highlands of Central America, northern South America and Southeast Asia. Other isolated examples of dwarf forests are scattered across the world also, while the largest dwarf forest is found in the Philippines.

== High-elevation tropical dwarf forest ==
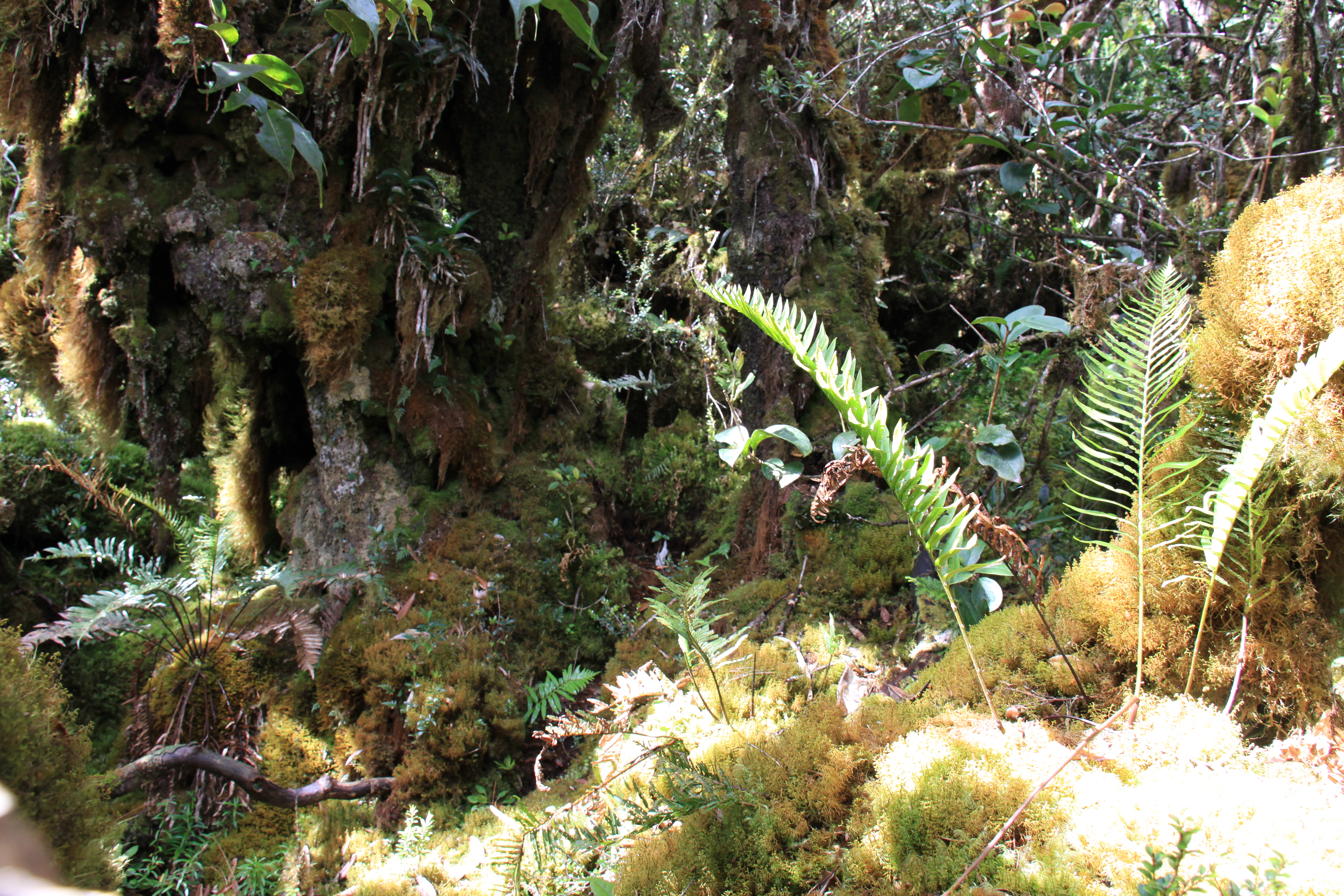
Elfin forest on Mt. Kemiri, Sumatra, at an elevation of about 3000 m

High-elevation tropical locations in cloud forests contain mossy wet elfin forests due to high-elevation precipitation. These regions are characterized by low rainfall, with most of the water in the form of mist and fog. The water supplied is primarily available during the night, when clouds move from the ocean over the mountains, and are intercepted by the vegetation. During the day, water demands are increased as clouds rise over the mountain peaks without dissipating into available forms of precipitation.

The forests are characterized by small trees (5–8 m) with shallow root systems and abundant epiphytes. The epiphytes make up a large portion of the canopy, with greater abundances in high-elevation tropical elfin forests than what is found in other, non-elfin, tropical forests.

Dwarf forests should be more commonly found on isolated mountains due to the Massenerhebung effect. The Massenerhebung effect is a phenomenon where treelines are typically higher among mountains in close proximity to other mountains. The mountains in close proximity affect the rate of wind and heat retention, decreasing the negative effects of climate. When the treeline is lower on isolated mountains, the climatic effects are more severe.

=== Flora ===
Within montane dwarf forests, there are relatively few species, with a small number of dominant species that make up a large portion of the population. Low, horizontally-branching, shrub-like plants, and dense populations of moss, lichen, and liverworts are found due to high wind speeds, low temperatures and light reduction from persistent clouds and fog, which limit the growth of tall plants. The high wind speeds act as the determining factor of the stature in dwarf forest flora, especially on ridges and slopes. A low stature increases the structural stability of the plants. Wind-exposed trees invest more of their resources to increasing strength than to growth, compared to non-wind-exposed trees. The increased focus on strengthening leads to thicker trunks and twigs, which increases the ability of the trees to withstand greater wind stresses near the ridge-crest, where the majority of wind-exposed trees are found. A large percentage of energy is also allocated to growing and maintaining heavy and extensive root structures, further strengthening the tree and increasing its resistance to high winds.

Plants here have leaves with moisture-tolerant characteristics, such as drip tips and waxy cuticles. They also have a slow rate of transpiration and metabolism due to low temperatures and low radiation penetration. A large percentage of plants possess alkaloids and other natural products, likely to combat a high amount of herbivory from insects. This may also account for the low leaf surface area and low transpiration rates of the plants. One study showed that leaves of ten plant species had approximately 70–98% of all leaves damaged by insects.

=== Fauna ===
Elfin forests occur at high elevations, which are generally associated with low vertebrate biodiversity. Hummingbirds and bats make up a large proportion of the vertebrates in some areas, usually as altitudinal migrants during seasonal shifts, such as for reproduction, or in response to food abundance. Other vertebrate species mostly include small rodents.

=== Seasonal variations ===
Rainfall tends to be highly seasonal, sparse, and far between, therefore fog interception is a significant water source during dry seasons. Throughout the year, wind speed, temperature and humidity are fairly consistent, with humidity usually greater than 90%. At one study site in the Guajira Peninsula, dry season precipitation ranged from 1–4 days per month, while in the wet season, although increased, it was still a relatively low 4 to 12 days per month, supporting the idea that the majority of the water in this region is held in low cloud cover and fog interception. Sunshine duration is distributed bimodally and correlates with evaporation rates.

=== Examples ===
- Pygmy forest of Mount Hamiguitan on Mindanao, Philippines at the elevation of 1160–1200 m a.s.l.). It is a national park and a protected area since 2004 and was declared a UNESCO World Heritage Site in 2014. It is estimated to have around 1,380 different species; with 341 endemic to the Philippines (including the Philippine eagle, the Philippine cockatoo and the Philippine tarsier). Several species are endemic to Mount Hamiguitan itself, like the Mount Hamiguitan pitcher plant (Nepenthes hamiguitanensis), the Mount Hamiguitan fern (Lindsaea hamiguitanensis) and the butterfly (Delias magsadana). At 6,834 hectares (16,890 acres) the extensive pygmy forest of Mount Hamiguitan is the largest known dwarf forest in the Philippines and possibly the world. It merges with mossy forests, dipterocarp forests, and montane forests at lower elevations.
- El Yunque National Forest of Puerto Rico features dwarf forest areas at elevations above 900 m, as does Los Tres Picachos State Forest.

== Coastal temperate elfin forest ==
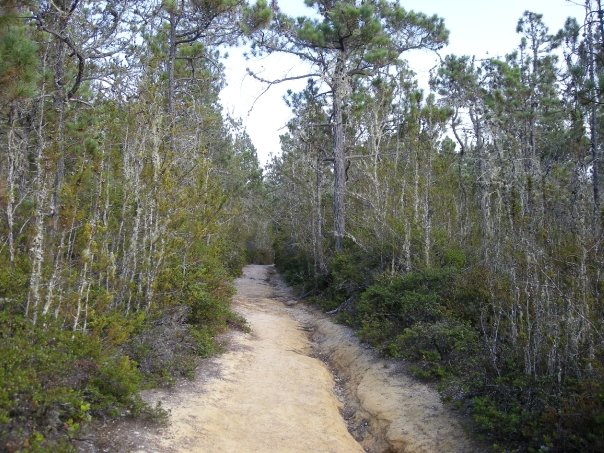
Pygmy forest at Salt Point State Park in northern California

Elfin forests of California are the primary example of coastal temperate dwarf forests. They are expansive, and cover most of the mountains in the southern half of California, extending into Mexico, Nevada, and Arizona. Other expanses of elfin forest are found throughout the state, in the northern and central regions.

In northern California, Salt Point State Park is home to an elfin forest with Mendocino cypress (Cupressus pygmaea), which is endemic to the Mendocino area. On the Central Coast of California, on the southeastern shore of Morro Bay, Los Osos contains the El Moro Elfin Forest Natural Area. The area is approximately 90 acres (36 ha). It derives the "elfin forest" title from the short California live oaks, which range in height from 4–20 feet (1.2–6.1 m), compared to the typical 30–80 feet (9.1–24.4 m). This region also contains the federally endangered Morro shoulderband snail (Helminthoglypta walkeriana). At a higher elevation, on Cuesta Ridge, the Land Conservancy of San Luis Obispo County manages the San Luis Obispo Elfin Forest of dwarf cypresses.

Factors such as soil moisture, solar radiation, and rockiness of soil influence species composition along an elevation gradient, resulting in certain shrub species, such as Adenostoma fasciculatum and Arctostaphylos glauca, being present in elfin forest habitats.

Fire occurs at low-moderate frequency with high severity. Many plants have adapted to this by having serotinous seeds that open to germinate only under high heat. Because of this, they are often the first to colonize a new area.

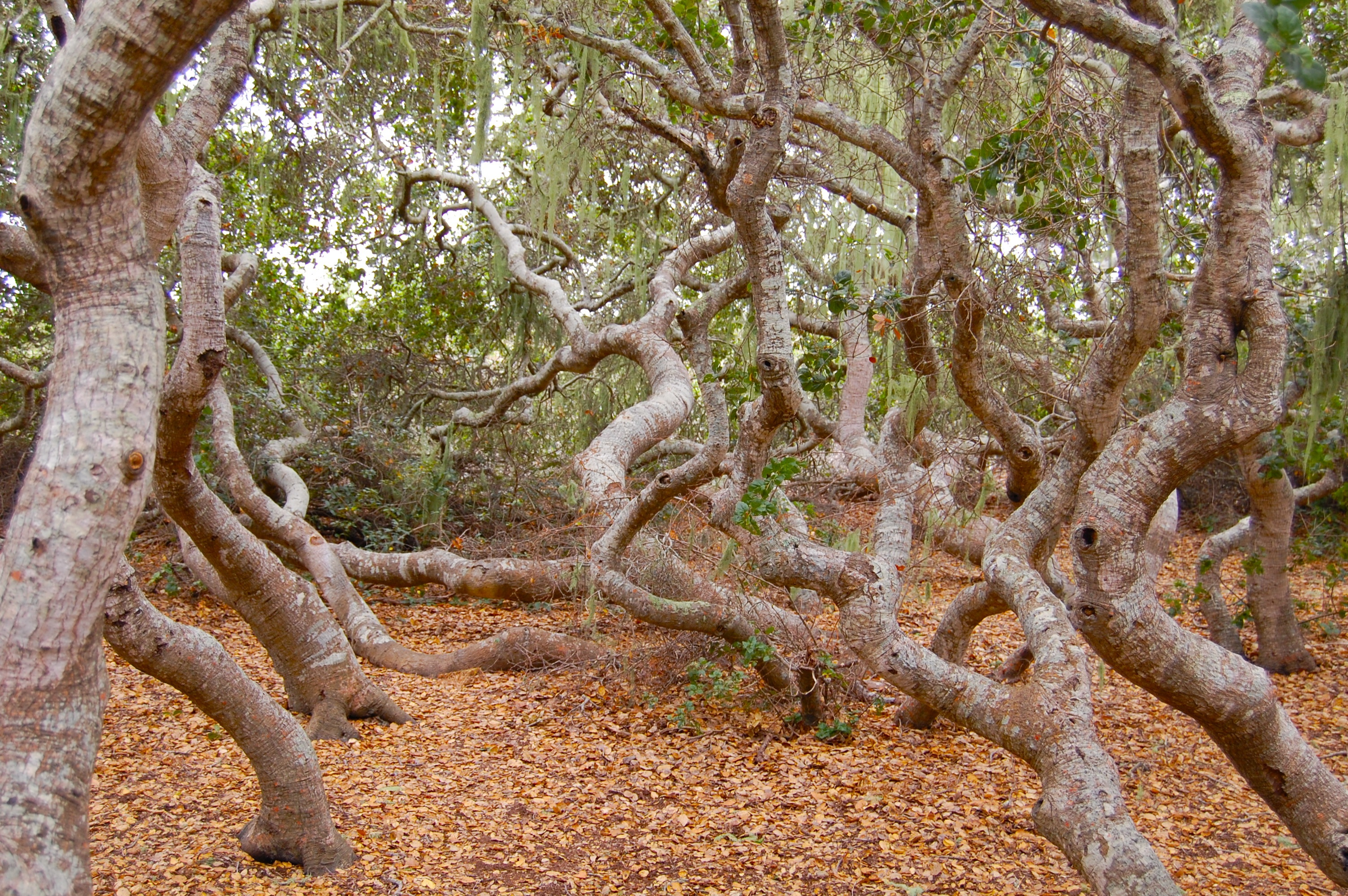
Pygmy coast live oaks in elfin forest, California

=== Flora ===
Chaparral areas can be waterlogged in the winter, and arid and desert-like in the summer, native plants in these dry elfin forests are generally much shorter, smaller, and compact than related plants elsewhere.

Some of the plants commonly found in Californian elfin forests, including many introduced species, are: diminutive plants such as Mount Hood pussypaws (Cistanthe umbellata), alkali heath (Frankenia salina), and species of bird's-foot trefoil (Lotus); and trees and shrubs such as chamise (Adenostoma fasciculatum), manzanita (Arctostaphylos), Ceanothus, sumac (Rhus), sage (Salvia) and scrub-oak (Quercus berberidifolia) which naturally grow less than 20 ft (7m) tall.

=== Fauna ===
Californian elfin forest fauna includes many species of deer mice (Peromyscus spp.), harvest mice (Reithrodontomys spp.), California vole (Microtus californicus), California pocket mouse (Chaetodipus californicus), kangaroo rat (Dipodomys spp.) and several species of spiny lizards (Sceloporus spp.), along with other small vertebrates. Invertebrates include burrowing scorpions (Opistophthalmus spp.), and various species of scorpions, spiders and ticks.

=== Seasonal variations ===
The Californian climate usually exhibits wet winters and dry summers. Plants found in elfin forests grow during winter months, and become dormant during the summer due to drought stress. Plant communities also rely on taking in moisture from the air by intercepting fog to supplement the low, seasonal rainfall.

=== Formation ===
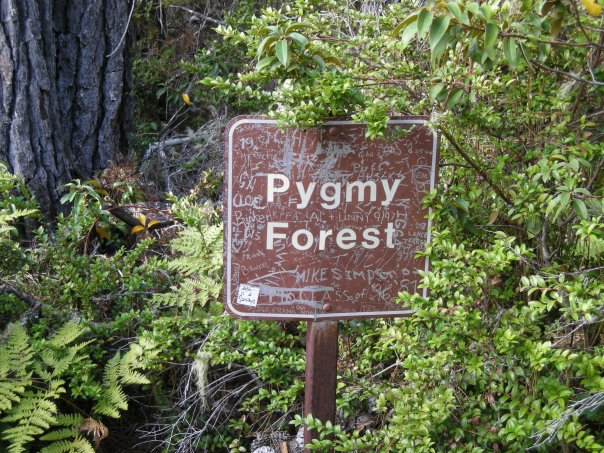
Trail signs at Salt Point alert hikers they are entering a pygmy forested region

Formation of coastal elfin forests in northern California and Oregon, began with a series of marine terraces. A combination of uplift and changes in ocean level formed a system of terraces, resulting in an “ecological staircase”, with each terrace approximately 100,000 years older than the one below it and supporting a distinct association of soils, microbes, plants, and animals. A dune being pushed farther away from the coast by fluctuating sea levels slides over the one before it and solidifies, raising the terraces. Pioneer plant communities colonize the young terrace. The succession of plant communities that repeats on each terrace eventually forms a very specific podzol known as the Blacklock series, which offers an inhospitable environment for species and greatly stunts further growth on the terrace. Part of this soil profile includes an underlying clay or iron hardpan. Each terrace is relatively level and many are footed by paleo-dunes. Drainage is poor at best on these stairs and plants sit in a bath of their own tannins and acids for much of the wet season. Due to limited root mobility and acidic soil, plant communities on these terraces grow into stunted forms. Remnants of ecological staircases doubtless exist, however most have been destroyed for development or logging.

Analyses of pygmy forest soils show low levels of macro- and micronutrients, and high levels of exchangeable aluminium, which limits the ability of plants to grow. Low pH conditions support formation of an iron hardpan, preventing the trees from setting deep roots and preventing internal drainage of soil water.

As a result, the pine trees in the area are rarely more than three or four feet high, in a sort of natural bonsai effect. Many of the tree trunks, though only an inch thick, contain 80 or more growth rings. Only yards away, but with younger soils, the same species of tree grows many dozens of feet high.

=== Examples ===
Examples of high-terrace podzol pygmy forests include:

- Mendocino pygmy forest in Mendocino County, California, for example, is an oligotrophic community caused by podzolized (nutrient-poor, highly acidic) soils. The forest flora is dominated by dwarfed bishop pine, bolander pine (a variety of shore pine), and Cupressus pygmaea. Bishop pine occurs in both dwarfed and full size form, the latter being trees whose roots have broken through the hardpan layer into the more fertile soil beneath. This forest is found in several discontinuous areas, with significant portions on the following public lands:
  - Jug Handle State Natural Reserve, where it is the feature of the highest portion of the Ecological Staircase Trail. Adjacent, to the east, is the Pygmy Forest National Natural Landmark. within Jackson Demonstration State Forest.
  - Russian Gulch State Park.
  - Jackson Demonstration State Forest includes a large pygmy forest area east of the towns of Mendocino and Caspar.
  - The Hans Jenny Pygmy Forest Reserve, co-managed by the University of California Natural Reserve System and The Nature Conservancy.
  - Within the Van Damme State Park is the Charlotte M. Hoak Pygmy Forest, located along the northern border of the park. A second pygmy forest location on the southern border has a self-guided nature trail built entirely on an elevated walkway forming a short loop through the site.
- Salt Point State Park in Sonoma County, California has a much smaller pygmy forest and a fifth terrace prairie ranging from 900 to 1000 feet and formerly supporting elk populations. Like the Mendocino forest, the dominant trees are also bishop pine, bolander pine, and C. pigmaea. Most of Salt Point is on the northernmost portion of the Salinian Block and the terrace staircase drops suddenly into the gulch that lies over the San Andreas Fault.
- SFB Morse Botanical Reserve in the Del Monte Forest of the Monterey Peninsula is centered on the small Huckleberry Hill pygmy forest of bishop pine and C. goveniana, in the middle of a more extensive forest of Monterey pine. Bishop pine, which tolerates extreme podzol conditions better than Monterey pine, is found in the most heavily podzolized areas, with a zone of bishop pine/Monterey pine hybrids dominating the less heavily podzolized area.

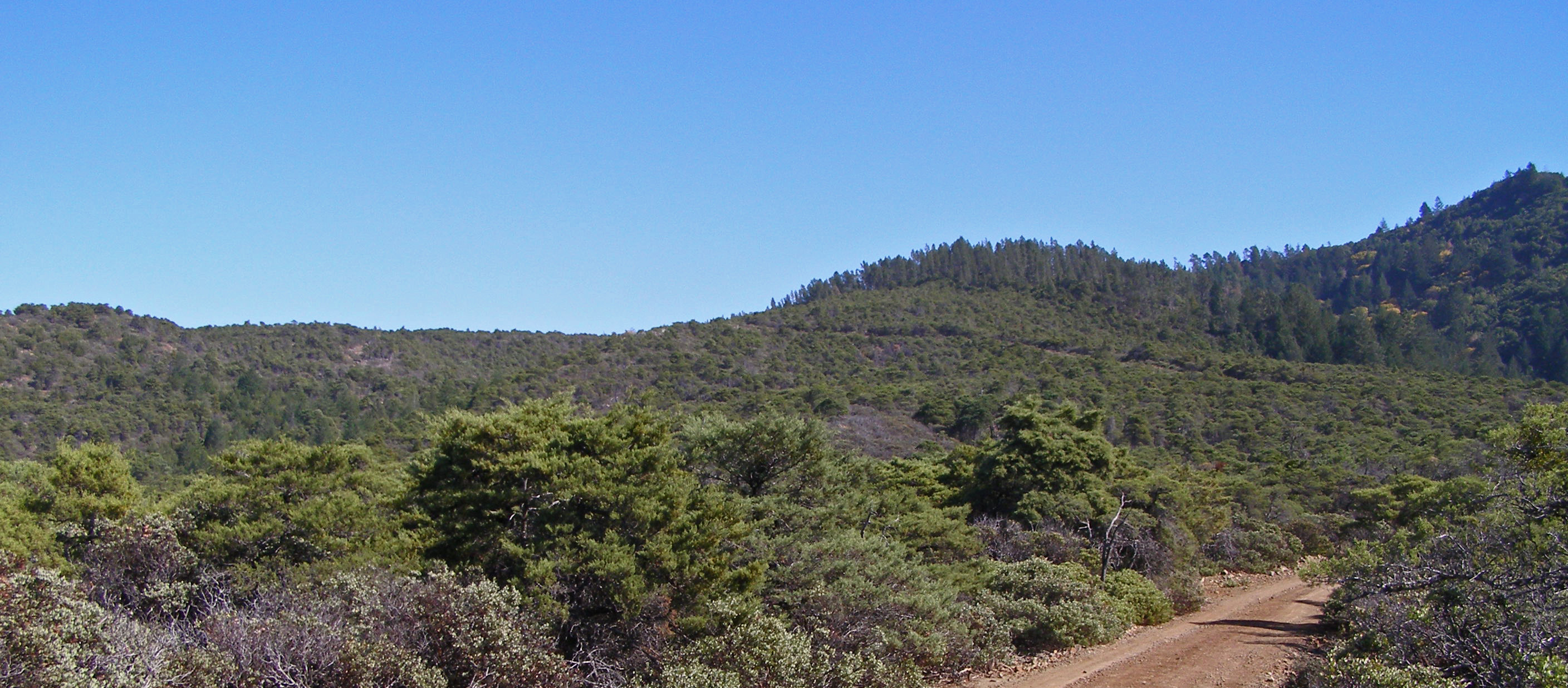
Pygmy forest on northwest slope of Hood Mountain

Other examples of California pygmy forests include:

- Elfin Forest Natural Area - El Moro Elfin Forest — 90 acre State Nature Reserve of 'pygmy oaks' (coast live oak, Quercus agrifolia). Located on the southeastern shore of Morro Bay, in Los Osos of coastal San Luis Obispo County. A raised wooden boardwalk loops through and around the forest, with viewing platforms.
- Cuesta Ridge Elfin Forest — in the Cuesta Ridge Botanical Special Interest Area, on western Cuesta Ridge of the Santa Lucia Range, in San Luis Obispo County. A pygmy Sargent's cypress (Hesperocyparis sargentii) forest, where serpentine soil stunts growth. Protected within the 1,334 acre Cuesta Ridge Botanical Special Interest Area, in the Santa Lucia Ranger District of the Los Padres National Forest.
- Dwarf Cupressus Preserve — a second West Cuesta Ridge grove of the pygmy cypress forest (C. sargentii), managed by the Land Conservancy of San Luis Obispo County.
- Henry Cowell Redwoods State Park — select pygmy forest locales in the Santa Cruz Mountains in Santa Cruz County.
- Mount Tamalpais dwarf forest — a forest of small C. pigmaea trees. The mountain's serpentine soil stunts the growth of these trees, causing them to grow only a few feet tall. On Old Stage Road, 0.5 miles northeast of the Bootjack Picnic Area.
- San Geronimo Ridge — just south of Whites Hill in Marin County.
- Hood Mountain — near Santa Rosa in Sonoma County. A pygmy cypress forest dominated by C. sargentii and Arctostaphylos species can be found on the northwest slopes.

== Other types ==
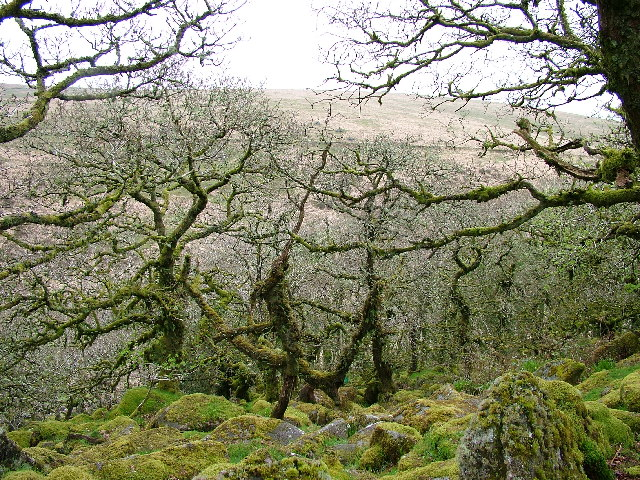
Dartmoor Forest in Wistman's Wood, southwest England

Dwarf forests may occur over various world locations, with different origins.

On the British west coast, notable occurrences include Wistman's Wood in Devon and isolated patches in the Ross of Mull on the Isle of Mull in Scotland.

Stunted tree growth can also occur in some cases of highly alkaline soils such as the Stora Alvaret (Great Alvar) formation on the island of Öland in Sweden. In that area are certain extents of pygmy tree growth and also areas devoid of trees entirely with many associations of rare species, due to the unique soil chemistry.

In New Jersey, the 3,830-acre (15 km^{2}) West Pine Plains Natural Area within the Bass River State Forest preserves a pygmy forest, consisting of pitch pine and blackjack oak trees that reach a height of as little as four feet at maturity. The ground cover includes bearberry and teaberry sub-shrubs, lichens and mosses. While the same species are present in the vast surrounding region of the Pine Barrens, dwarf plant size is attributed to drier, nutrient-poor soil, exposure to winds, and frequent wildfires in the area.

== Conservation ==
In the high-elevation Antilles elfin forests reduced solar radiation and low evapotranspiration rates means these mountain regions retain moisture. Environmental degradation may affect this.

Elfin forests in California serve important roles in regulating stream flow, preventing soil erosion, and preventing evaporation by shading the ground. Clear cutting for agricultural and economic development, amongst other things, may disrupt this.

== See also ==
- Krummholz – subarctic and alpine dwarf forest
- Pedology (soil study)
