= Amphibious Training Base Morro Bay =

California training base during World War II

- Part of US Navy
- Morro Bay, California, U.S.
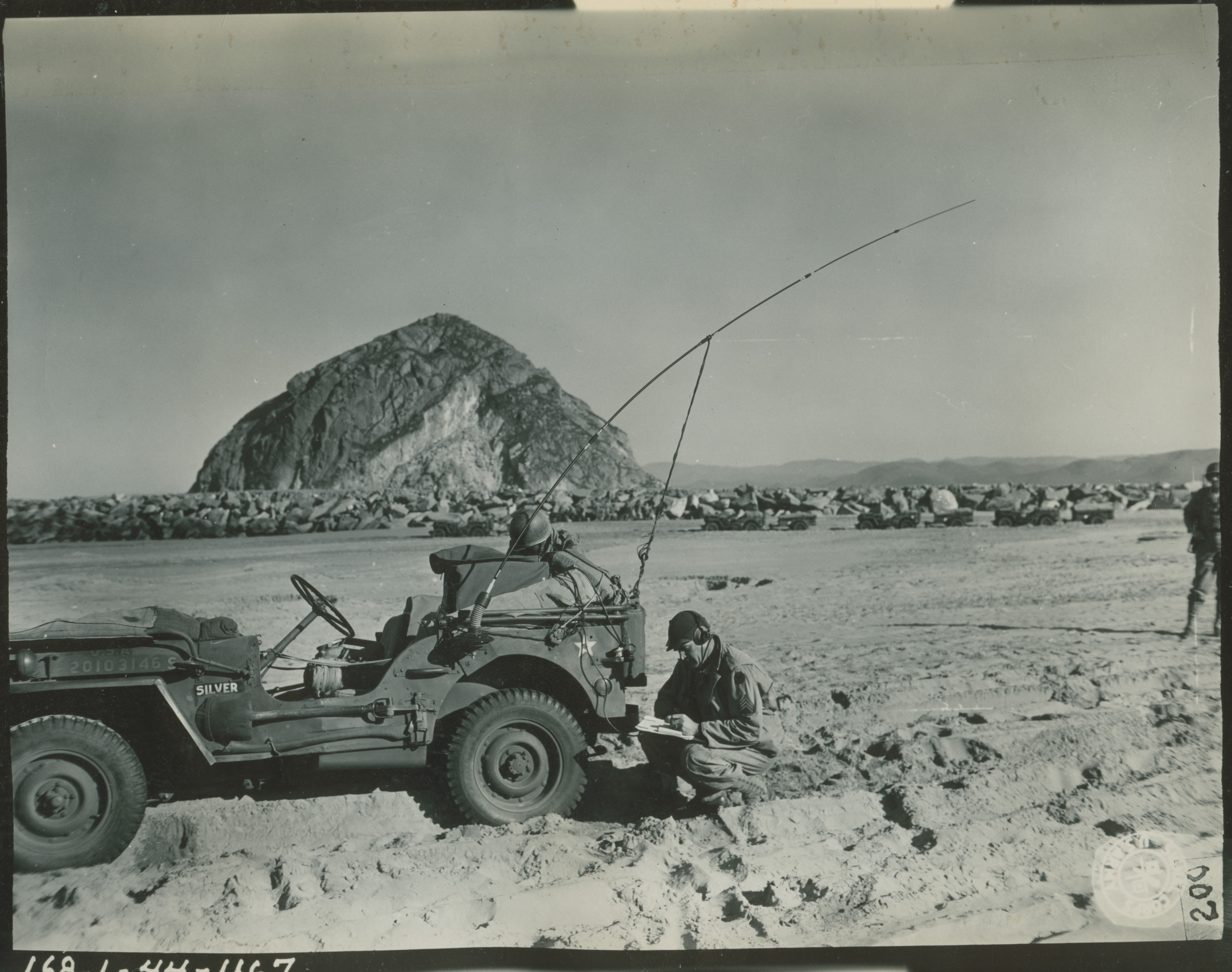
- Amphibious Training Base Morro Bay, U.S. Army Signal Corps training in 1943

Site information
- Type: Military training base
- Owner: United States
- Controlled by: United States Navy

Location
- Coordinates: 35°22′19″N 120°51′25″W

Site history
- Built: 1941
- In use: 1941–1945
- Fate: Closed in 31 October 1945
- Demolished: 1947
- Events: Amphibious Training for World War II

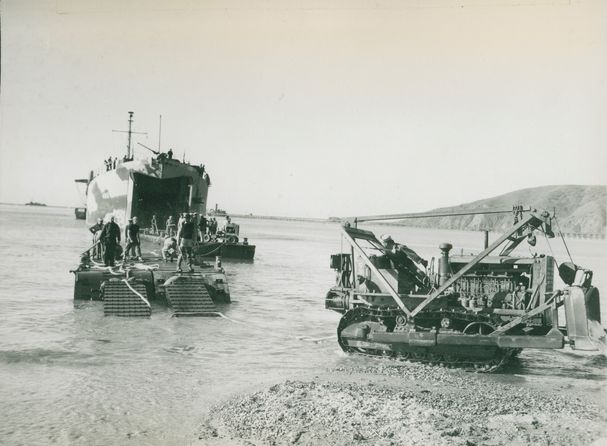
Avila Beach's Amphibious Training Base Morro Bay on 7 March 1944. An amphibious training exercise, with pontoon bridge attached to Landing Ship, Tank. Army Signal Corps photo.

Amphibious Training Base Morro Bay also called Camp Morro Bay and Morro Bay Section Base was a US Navy training base for amphibious beach assault during World War II. The base opened in 1941 to train troops for the Pacific theater of operations' island leapfrogging using landing craft and LCVP. The base was located in Morro Bay, California in San Luis Obispo County. The base was on 250 acres (100 ha) of leased land. Ships for the base were based at the Avila's Port San Luis in San Luis Bay. Which was also leased with the yacht club and its warehouse. Added to the leased land was: two piers, mess hall, gallon water storage tanks, roads, buildings, garages, and ammo storage area. The Navy also extended the bay's breakwater. A wooden trestle bridge was built to get to the nearby sandspit (now Morro Bay State Park), the bridge was removed in 1946 and some pillars still remain. The near Estero Bay was the site of training assault also, by the Navy, US Army, US Marine Corps and United States Coast Guard also taking over the unused vacation hotel there. Nearby United States Army Air Corps fields had fighter aircraft fire flour shot to make the training more real. Up to 175 landing craft were at the base and 16,000 troops a day trained. In the base and in nearby Los Osos and Baywood live fire bombing, machine gun, bazookas, and flamethrowers were used for training. The training ended on 31 October 1945 and the site is now a Duke Energy power plant built in 1955, site of three large smoke stacks. North of the former base in the notable Morro Rock. Avila Beach was also a Union Oil plant with many oil storage tanks, use for Navy ships.

== Baywood Park Training Area ==
Baywood Park Training Area opened in July 1943 as a branch of the Camp San Luis Obispo and Amphibious Training Base Morro Bay. The site was on 8,810 acres (3,570 ha) of leased land. The site is in the current town of Baywood-Los Osos, California and the Morro Bay State Park. The lease ended in 1947.

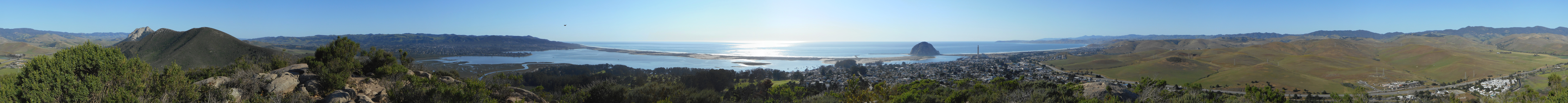
Site of the Amphibious Training Base Morro Bay in a panoramic view of Morro Bay (near side of sandspit), Estero bay (far side of sandspit), Los Osos, Baywood Park, Chorro Valley, and Hollister Peak, from Black Hill

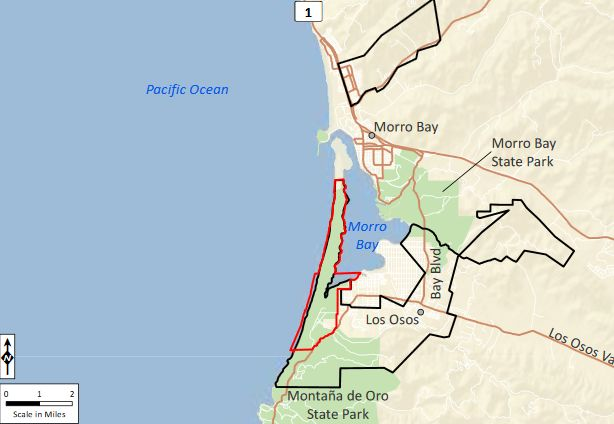
The Red outline is the Baywood Park Training Area only

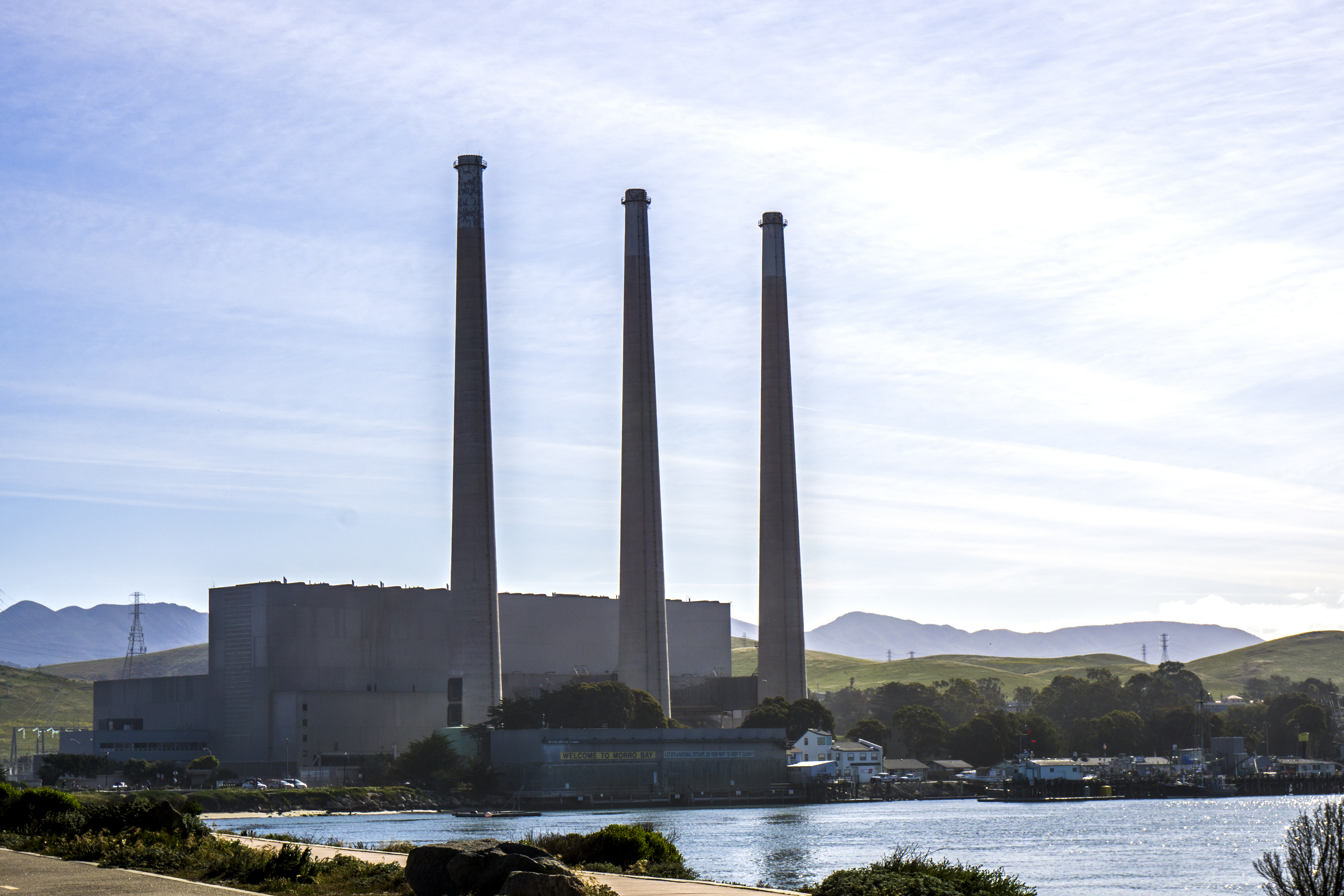
Dynegy Morro Bay Power Plant, site of former Amphibious Training Base Morro Bay HQ

Morro Bay site of the former Amphibious Training Base Morro Bay

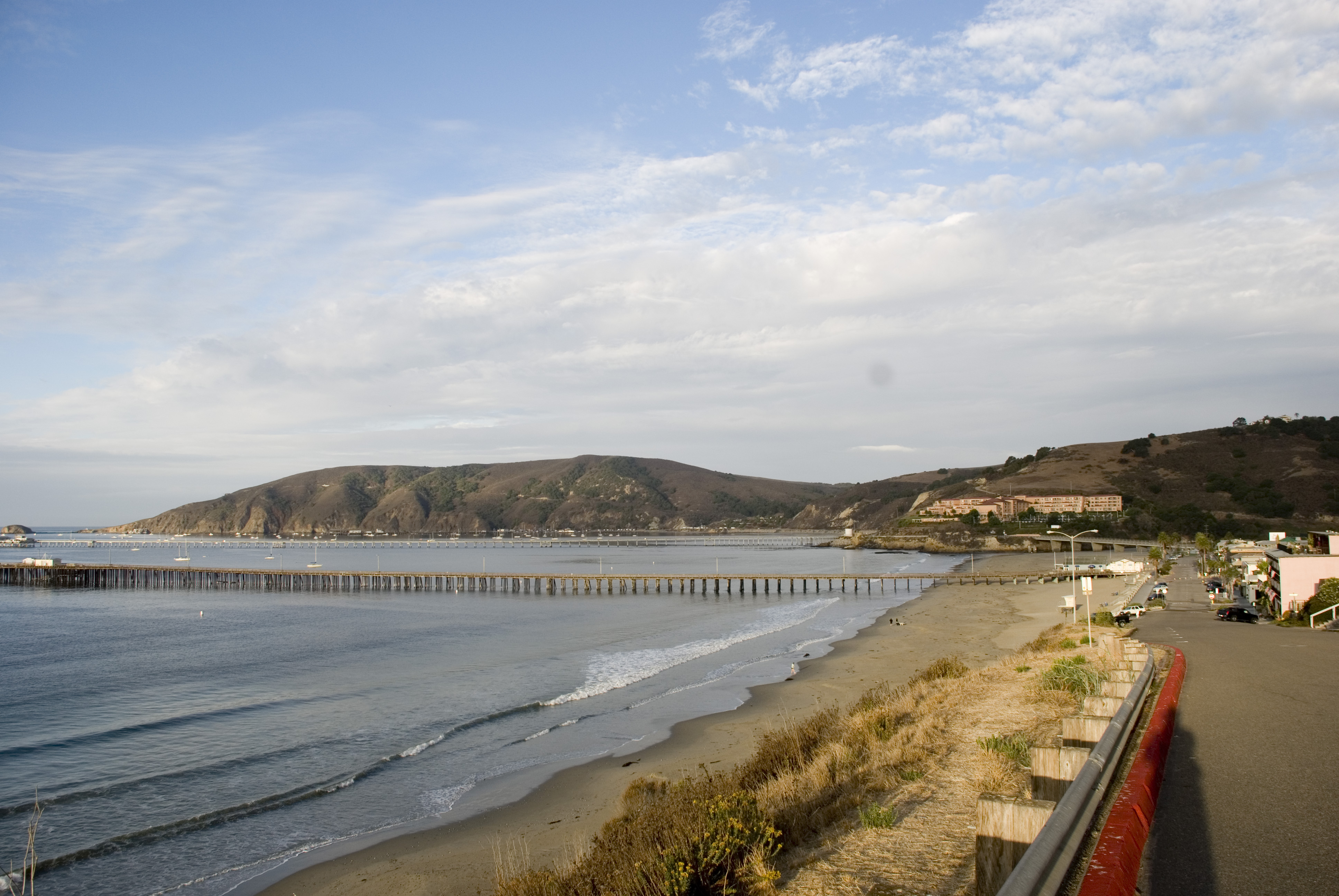
Avila Beach, with Point San Luis at left

== See also ==
- California during World War II
- Camp San Luis Obispo
- NAAS Monterey, a supporting airfield
- NAS Alameda, a supporting airfield
- Naval Auxiliary Air Station, San Luis Obispo, the main supporting airfield
- SS Montebello, a tanker that was sunk after departing the base by Japanese submarine I-21
