= Los Osos, California =

Unincorporated community in California, United States

- Unincorporated community Census-designated place
- Aerial View of Los Osos, California
- Interactive map of Los Osos, California
- Location within the state of California Location within the United States
- Coordinates: 35°19′21″N 120°49′53″W
- Country: United States
- State: California
- County: San Luis Obispo

Government
  - Type: County Government

Area
  - Total: 12.784 sq mi (33.110 km^{2})
  - Land: 12.763 sq mi (33.057 km^{2})
  - Water: 0.020 sq mi (0.053 km^{2}) 0.16%
- Elevation: 200 ft (61 m)

Population (2020)
  - Total: 14,465
  - Density: 1,133.3/sq mi (437.58/km^{2})
- Time zone: UTC−8 (Pacific (PST))
  - Summer (DST): UTC−7 (PDT)
- ZIP codes: 93402 and 93412
- Area code: 805
- GNIS feature ID: 2407812
- Website: https://lobpchamber.org/

Los Osos (Spanish for "the bears") is an unincorporated town in San Luis Obispo County, California, United States. Located on the Central Coast of California, Los Osos had a reported population of 14,465 in 2020. For statistical purposes, the United States Census Bureau has defined Los Osos as a census-designated place (CDP).

== History ==
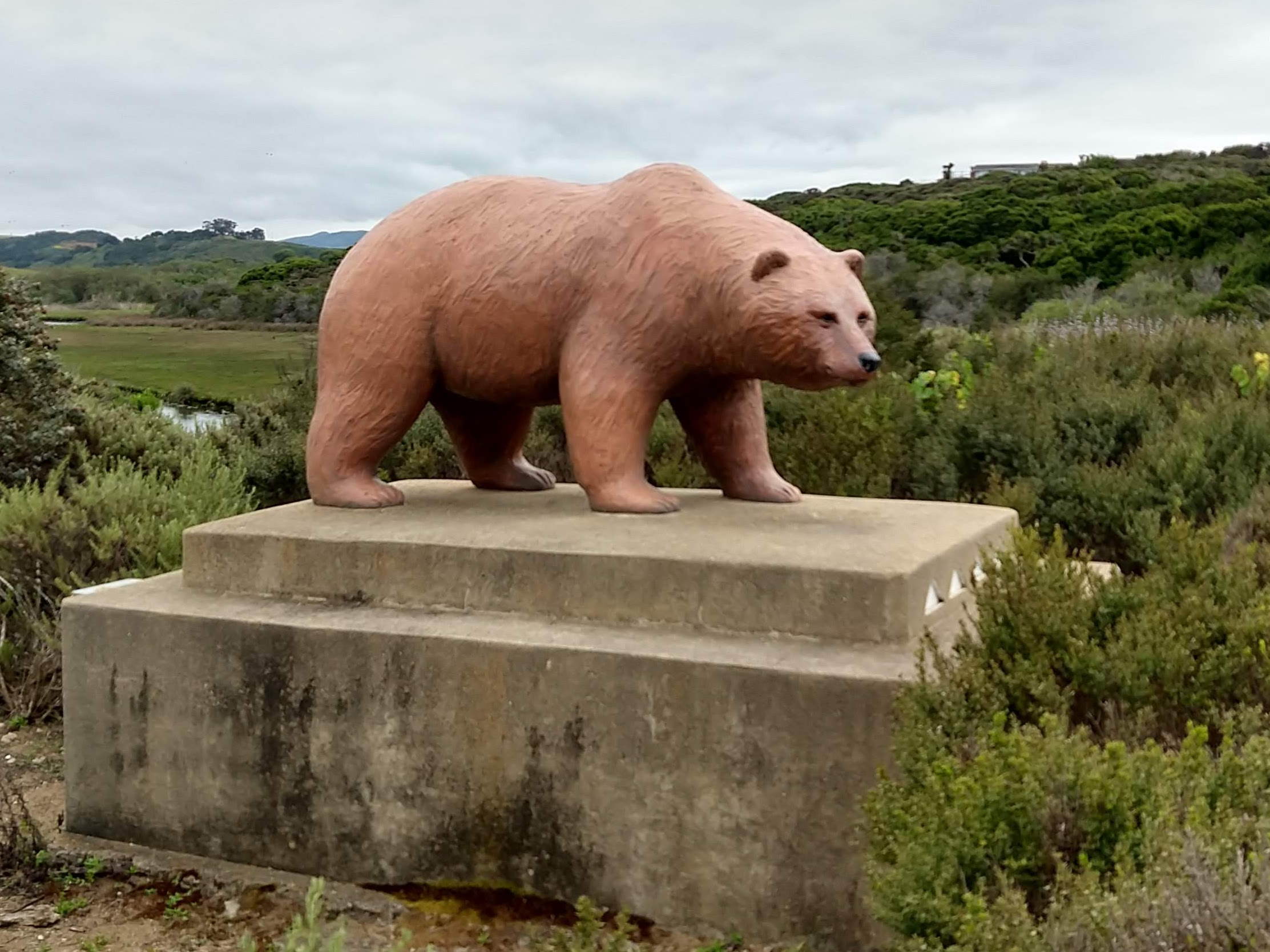
Los Osos bear statue by the side of South Bay Blvd.

Northern Chumash people, known in their language as yak titʸu titʸu yak tiłhini, are the first inhabitants of the Los Osos area, as well as much of San Luis Obispo County. The Northern Chumash place name Petpatsu has been identified to be near or within the area of Los Osos. These peoples traditionally rely on the harvesting of fish and shellfish (e.g. Macoma nasuta) from Morro Bay, as well as the harvesting of acorns and vegetables from the surrounding areas. There is a large Northern Chumash archaeological site on a stabilized sand dune in Los Osos dating to at least as early as 1200 CE. The remains of two Northern Chumash people were removed from a site at Sweet Springs Nature Preserve dating to around 1700 BCE, and were later inventoried under NAGPRA and are possibly in the process of repatriation to the individuals' descendants. Cabrillo first encountered the Chumash in the year 1542. Today, Northern Chumash people are as of yet federally unrecognized, but continue to organize themselves under the Northern Chumash Tribal Council, which is headquartered in Los Osos.

On September 7 – 8, 1769, the Portolá expedition traveled through the San Luis Obispo area on their way to rediscover the Bay of Monterey. Finding an abundance of bears in the area, his diarist, Padre Juan Crespi, O.F.M., recorded that the name given the area by his soldiers was "Los Osos" (Spanish for "the bears"). Sources disagree about whether the rest of the Spanish name Crespi recorded was "llano" (plain) or "cañada" (glen).

The Portolá expedition was the beginning of a push by Spain to explore the northwestern frontier of Las Californias, and to establish both military outposts and missions. The move was intended to counter what were thought to be colonial designs by Russian traders from Alaska and the British fur companies in the Pacific Northwest. (See: Fort Ross, Russian-American Company, Hudson's Bay Company) The Portolá expedition was organized by the Visitadór Generál of New Spain, José de Gálvez, following up (belatedly) on previous maritime expeditions, most notably that of Sebastián Vizcaíno in 1602–3, who visited and described many points along the coast, including Monterey Bay, Portolá's primary destination.

== Geography ==
Located in the Los Osos Valley, Los Osos is largely a bedroom community for San Luis Obispo, which is 10.6 miles (17.1 km) east, and to a lesser extent, Morro Bay, which is 2.3 miles (3.7 km) to the north. There is a small business district concentrated in just a few blocks along Los Osos Valley Road, and several shops servicing the Baywood section of Los Osos, near the bay. The rest of the town is almost entirely residential. Its population is approximately 14,500 and total population at build-out is limited to approximately 26,000.

According to the United States Census Bureau, the CDP covers an area of 12.8 square miles (33 km^{2}), of which 99.84% is land, and 0.16% is water. The census definition of the area may not precisely correspond to local understanding of the area with the same name.

=== Climate ===
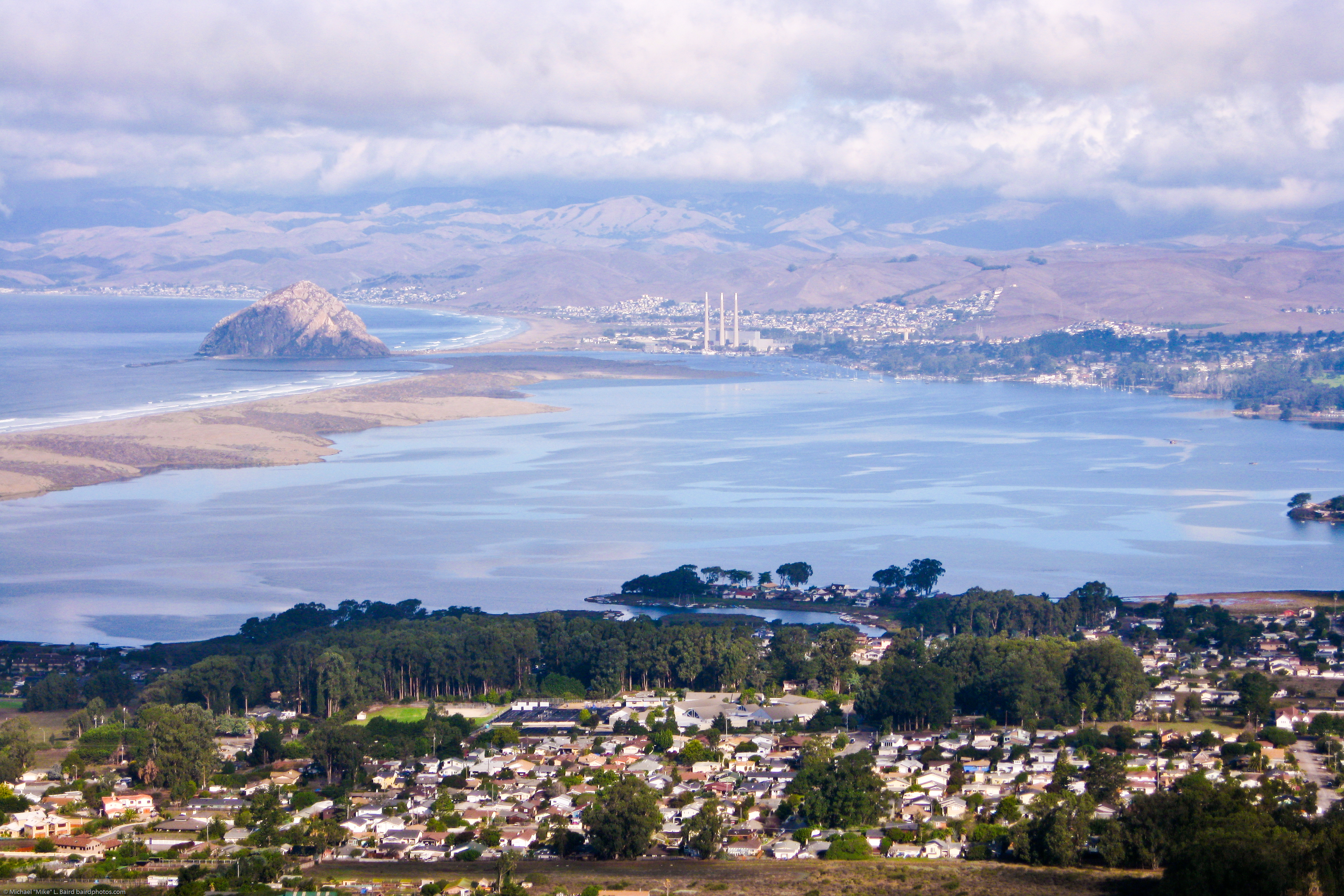
View of Los Osos and Morro Bay from Broderson Hill.

Los Osos experiences a mild warm-summer Mediterranean climate (Köppen Csb) characteristic of coastal California featuring dry, warm summers and wet, mild winters. The city is located next to the Pacific Ocean, which helps moderate temperatures and create an overall pleasant mild year-round climate, resulting in warmer winters and cooler summers compared with places farther inland, such as Atascadero. Summers are cool for a city located on the 35th parallel north latitude, with July averaging around 60 °F (16 °C). Winters are mild, with January averaging at 55 °F (13 °C) with approximately eight days of measurable precipitation.

Climate data for Los Osos (Morro Bay, CA (1981–2010 normals, extremes 1959–present)
| Month | Jan | Feb | Mar | Apr | May | Jun | Jul | Aug | Sep | Oct | Nov | Dec | Year |
|---|---|---|---|---|---|---|---|---|---|---|---|---|---|
| Record high °F (°C) | 89 (32) | 87 (31) | 92 (33) | 100 (38) | 98 (37) | 86 (30) | 92 (33) | 94 (34) | 101 (38) | 106 (41) | 92 (33) | 81 (27) | 106 (41) |
| Mean daily maximum °F (°C) | 65.0 (18.3) | 65.6 (18.7) | 66.4 (19.1) | 66.7 (19.3) | 65.7 (18.7) | 66.9 (19.4) | 68.1 (20.1) | 69.1 (20.6) | 70.5 (21.4) | 71.4 (21.9) | 69.2 (20.7) | 64.8 (18.2) | 67.4 (19.7) |
| Daily mean °F (°C) | 54.8 (12.7) | 55.9 (13.3) | 56.8 (13.8) | 57.2 (14.0) | 57.9 (14.4) | 59.7 (15.4) | 61.6 (16.4) | 62.3 (16.8) | 62.5 (16.9) | 61.8 (16.6) | 58.8 (14.9) | 54.6 (12.6) | 58.7 (14.8) |
| Mean daily minimum °F (°C) | 44.6 (7.0) | 46.2 (7.9) | 47.3 (8.5) | 47.7 (8.7) | 50.2 (10.1) | 52.5 (11.4) | 55.0 (12.8) | 55.6 (13.1) | 54.6 (12.6) | 52.2 (11.2) | 48.5 (9.2) | 44.5 (6.9) | 49.9 (9.9) |
| Record low °F (°C) | 23 (−5) | 22 (−6) | 28 (−2) | 31 (−1) | 33 (1) | 39 (4) | 40 (4) | 40 (4) | 41 (5) | 36 (2) | 31 (−1) | 22 (−6) | 22 (−6) |
| Average precipitation inches (mm) | 3.57 (91) | 3.77 (96) | 3.29 (84) | 1.10 (28) | 0.43 (11) | 0.08 (2.0) | 0.01 (0.25) | 0.05 (1.3) | 0.24 (6.1) | 0.82 (21) | 1.40 (36) | 2.72 (69) | 17.48 (444) |
| Average precipitation days (≥ 0.01 in) | 7.8 | 9.2 | 7.8 | 4.9 | 1.7 | 0.6 | 0.4 | 0.5 | 1.5 | 3.0 | 5.0 | 7.1 | 49.5 |
Source: NOAA

== Demographics ==
Los Osos was combined with the adjoining unincorporated area of Baywood Park to form the census-designated place of Baywood-Los Osos, but they were split into separate CDPs for the 2010 census.

=== 2020 census ===
As of the 2020 census, Los Osos had a population of 14,465 and a population density of 1,133.4 inhabitants per square mile (437.6/km^{2}). The median age was 49.3 years. 17.3% of residents were under the age of 18 and 27.7% of residents were 65 years of age or older. For every 100 females there were 93.7 males, and for every 100 females age 18 and over there were 90.4 males age 18 and over.

96.6% of residents lived in urban areas, while 3.4% lived in rural areas.

The Census reported that 14,389 people (99.5% of the population) lived in households, 72 (0.5%) lived in noninstitutionalized group quarters, and 4 were institutionalized.

There were 6,025 households in Los Osos, and 1,383 (23.0%) had children under the age of 18 living in them. The average household size was 2.40. Of all households, 3,061 (50.8%) were married-couple households, 974 (16.2%) were households with a male householder and no spouse or partner present, and 1,585 (26.3%) were households with a female householder and no spouse or partner present. About 27.5% of all households were made up of individuals and 16.5% had someone living alone who was 65 years of age or older.

There were 6,517 housing units, of which 7.5% were vacant. Of occupied units, 4,203 (69.8%) were owner-occupied and 1,822 (30.2%) were occupied by renters. The homeowner vacancy rate was 0.5% and the rental vacancy rate was 2.1%.

Racial composition as of the 2020 census
| Race | Number | Percent |
|---|---|---|
| White | 10,993 | 76.0% |
| Black or African American | 85 | 0.6% |
| American Indian and Alaska Native | 131 | 0.9% |
| Asian | 754 | 5.2% |
| Native Hawaiian and Other Pacific Islander | 13 | 0.1% |
| Some other race | 859 | 5.9% |
| Two or more races | 1,630 | 11.3% |
| Hispanic or Latino (of any race) | 2,290 | 15.8% |

== Parks and wildlife ==
The 32-acre (13 ha) Sweet Springs Nature Preserve is a notable natural areas in Los Osos.

Los Osos serves as the entrance to Montaña de Oro State Park. Los Osos Valley Road reaches the coast at the south end of Estero Bay and continues south into the state park. Morro Bay State Park borders the northeast of the town. The 90-acre (36 ha) Elfin Forest is on the southeast side of the estuary that lies between Los Osos and Morro Bay State Park.

Large groves of eucalyptus trees attract the annually migrating monarch butterflies to Los Osos. Though rarely seen in residential neighborhoods, a bear population is centered in the Los Padres National Forest which is some 10 miles (16 km) away.

== Education ==
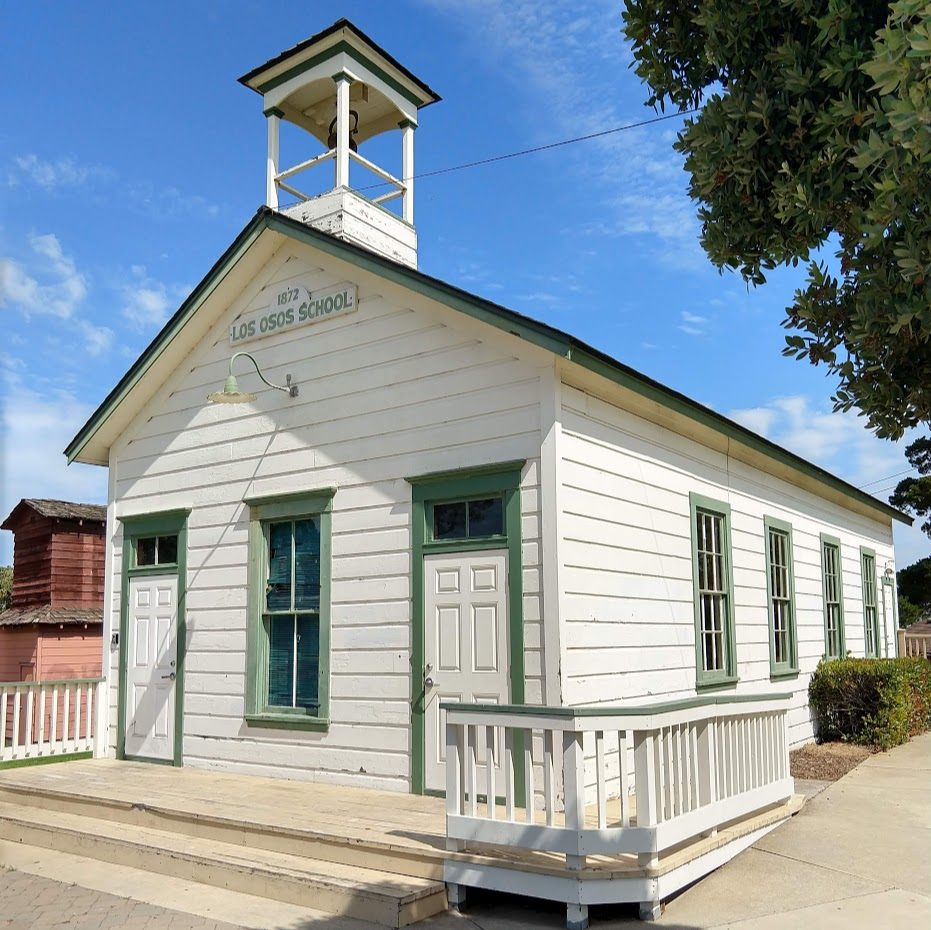
The restored Los Osos Schoolhouse located in the Los Osos Community Park.

Los Osos is part of the San Luis Coastal Unified School District, and is served by these public schools:

- Elementary Schools: Baywood Elementary and Monarch Grove Elementary. A third elementary school, Sunnyside Elementary, has been closed and used for other educational purposes since 2004.
- Middle Schools: Los Osos Middle School
- High Schools: Morro Bay High School in Morro Bay or San Luis Obispo High School in San Luis Obispo (Los Osos students are bused to this school in spite of the district generally eliminating high school bus service.)

The Los Osos School District and school was founded in 1872. The one room schoolhouse was used until it closed in 1958. The restored schoolhouse is now located in the Los Osos Community Park.

== Infrastructure ==
=== Transportation ===
There are two roads connecting Los Osos to other communities: South Bay Boulevard, which leads to Morro Bay via Highway 1, and Los Osos Valley Road, which leads to San Luis Obispo.

The San Luis Obispo Regional Transit Authority provides local service on a loop of the town, then express service to Morro Bay, Cuesta College and San Luis Obispo.

Due to Los Osos' proximity to the Diablo Canyon Power Plant, warning sirens are located throughout the town so that the residents will be warned if the power plant should suffer a meltdown or other adverse event.

=== Sewer system ===
Since 1983, a section of the community of Los Osos (Prohibition Zone) has been under a septic tank discharge prohibition, Resolution 83–13, issued by the Central Coast Regional Water Quality Control Board because that part of the town's septic tanks are too numerous and concentrated to dissipate nitrates. A building moratorium within the Prohibition Zone became effective in 1989 as part of the discharge prohibition. San Luis Obispo County was the original authority in charge of building the Wastewater Treatment System. Although the design of the county's selected project was nearly complete they were unable to bring the project to fruition. In July 1997, the County appeared before the California Coastal Commission to address an appeal of the construction permit for the project. Due to voiced opposition at the meeting from members of the Los Osos/Baywood Park Community, the Commission postponed its decision until a full hearing could be held. In 1998 an election was held to form the Los Osos Community Services District (LOCSD) by residents as a response to the high cost of the original sewer proposal. The original billing for the sewer of $50 a month in 1984 and by 2010 was estimated to exceed $200 a month, with the estimated cost of construction of the facilities and collection system to be well over $150 million before tax and interest. On January 1, 1999, the District was established and assumed responsibility for constructing the project.

There was also a controversy about where the sewer should be built. A location in the center of Los Osos (once known as the Tri-W site after the names of the previous owners of the property, now called the Mid-Town site), was chosen partly because of a desire for an additional park. The county, Planning Commission and the Coastal Commission approved a sewer at the site after hearing critics' claims.

In August 2005 the LOCSD began building a sewer at the Mid-Town site, contractors began work on the project and were advanced payments from a State Revolving Fund loan. Following a recall election which replaced the majority of the LOCSD board and enactment of an initiative measure that would require relocation of the project, the new board stopped construction of the sewer, and despite a letter warning them of severe consequences from the Regional Water Quality Control Board.

In October 2005, the LOCSD defaulted on a low interest State Revolving Fund loan. The state subsequently refused to disburse additional project funds and demanded immediate repayment of project funds that had dispersed. Project contractors filed lawsuits for more than $23 million in costs and lost profits. The Central Coast Regional Water Quality Control Board has used its enforcement powers to impose fines against the district in the amount of $6.6 million for violation of the discharge prohibition emanating from three LOCSD-owned sites. During February 2006 the Regional Water Quality Control Board, threatened it would begin to issue cease and desist orders to citizens of Los Osos, and may require recipients to pump their septic systems every three years, and to stop using them by 2011.

On August 25, 2006, the district filed for Chapter 9 bankruptcy protection in federal court. While the district had enough money to cover day-to-day needs, it did not have enough money to cover its legal fees and consultant fees. This action stayed the legal actions against the district related to money owed. Contractor lawsuits and other actions seeking monetary damages or claims against the district will be held in abeyance while the district addresses its financial situation. Subsequently, the LOCSD Bankruptcy Plan was approved in 2013. All claimants party to the bankruptcy were paid 45 cents on the dollar. The LOCSD, as the debtor of the Bankruptcy, was required to raise 2.5 million dollars to pay claimants by selling the LOCSD solid water franchise to the County of SLO.

Additionally, legislation has been approved by the California legislature that could return control of construction of the wastewater treatment facility to the County of San Luis Obispo but only after a due diligence period and a resolution by the county to accept the project. The legislation took the project away from the LOCSD. The LOCSD is still providing approximately one half of the town's drinking water, and is in charge of drainage, parks and recreation, street lighting, the contracting of fire, emergency and rescue services as well as solid waste services. The bill, AB 2701, was signed by the governor and went into effect January 1, 2007. A plan has been approved by the County Board of Supervisors, amended by the County Planning Commission pursuant to some of the objections raised by the community and its Community Advisory Council. The California Coastal Commission has denied the county a permit to proceed due to "Substantial Issues" that were cited during an appeals hearing. A De-Novo hearing is still pending. As of April 2010 with more than $7 million spent the county has not voted to accept the project.

Since April 2010, the County of San Luis Obispo underwent the de Novo hearing referred to above. The project was approved by the California Coastal Commission and given permission to proceed with the project. The County officially accepted the project and construction commenced in early 2015. By November 2017 project construction was complete. To date, all but 210 property owners have connected to the sewer. The remaining few not connected are awaiting low interest loans from the government to proceed with connecting to the sewer. As of May 26, 2020 all property owners within the sewer project area have connected to the sewer.

== Notable people ==
- Art Clokey, famous for his stop motion clay animation such as Gumby and Davey and Goliath.
- Erik Lindmark, influential death metal musician and record label founder.
- Jerome Long, drafted by the Kansas City Chiefs in the 7th round in the 2012 NFL draft.
- Robert Osterloh, American actor.
- Camden Toy, actor, writer, film editor and psychotherapist.
- Alma Ziegler, baseball player for the All-American Girls Professional Baseball League from 1944 to 1954.

== See also ==
- Amphibious Training Base Morro Bay used Los Osos during World War 2
- Elfin Forest Natural Area
- Los Osos Oaks State Natural Reserve
- Baywood-Los Osos, California
