= Los Osos Back Bay =

Californian historic site in the Los Osos Valley

Coordinates: 35.3223°N 120.8218°W

Los Osos Back Bay is a prehistoric Chumash archaeological site in the Los Osos Valley, near the coast in San Luis Obispo County, California.

These ancient Californian Native Americans had a significant settlement, now named "Los Osos Back Bay," on a stabilized sand dune. It is to the west of the Elfin Forest Natural Area, which has another midden within it.

Los Osos Back Bay is also the present day name for the southernmost part of the Morro Bay estuary, known by the locals as "the back bay". It is where the native Chumash at the eponymous archaeological site gathered marine resources, as coastal tribes along this part of the California coast regularly did.

== See also ==
- Los Osos Creek
- Los Osos Oaks State Natural Reserve
