= Frederick Forrest Peabody =

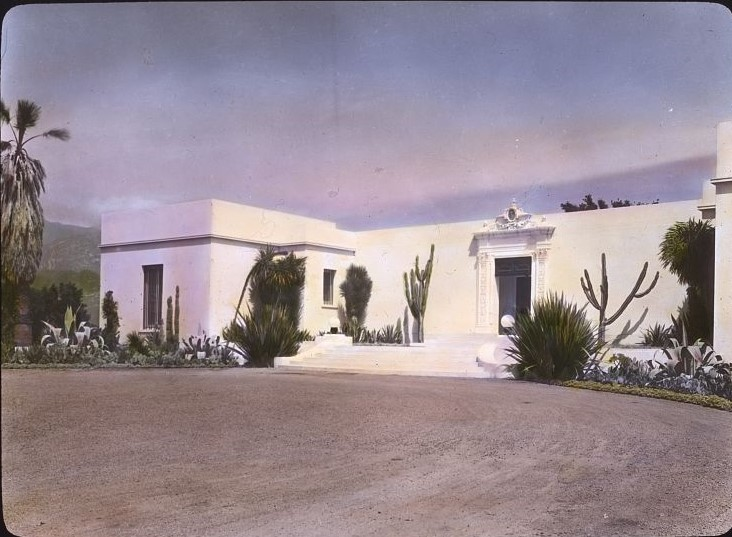
- "Solana," Frederick Forrest Peabody house, Eucalyptus Hill Road, Montecito, by Frances Benjamin Johnston, 1917. Architect: Francis Townsend Underhill (1913-1914). Landscape: Charles Frederick Eaton, from 1906
- Born: July 6, 1859; Northfield, Vermont, U.S.
- Died: February 23, 1927 (aged 68); Santa Barbara, California, U.S.
- Occupation: Businessman
- Known for: Founder and partner and President of the Cluett and Peabody Collar Company which produced Arrow Shirts

Frederick Forrest Peabody (July 6, 1859 – February 23, 1927) was a prominent citizen of Santa Barbara, California, in the early twentieth century. As chairman of the local Board of Education, he oversaw the construction of Santa Barbara High School, and as a philanthropist he contributed generously to the rebuilding of the city after the 1925 earthquake.

== Life ==
He was born in Northfield, Vermont, where he acquired a minimal formal education, entering business at the age of 17.

Described often as a self-made man, he worked his way up to become President of Cluett, Peabody and Co. of Troy, New York, a post he held for ten years. He was instrumental in marketing the popular Arrow brand shirts and collars. In his later life he gave generously to causes that helped the less fortunate. He donated the Peabody Stadium to Santa Barbara High School and the land for the Peabody Charter School.

== Affiliations ==
- Bankers Club of New York City
- Bohemian Club of San Francisco
- University Club of Santa Barbara
- La Cumbre Country Club
- Montecito Country Club
