= Los Osos Oaks State Natural Reserve =

Natural reserve in California

- IUCN category V (protected landscape/seascape)
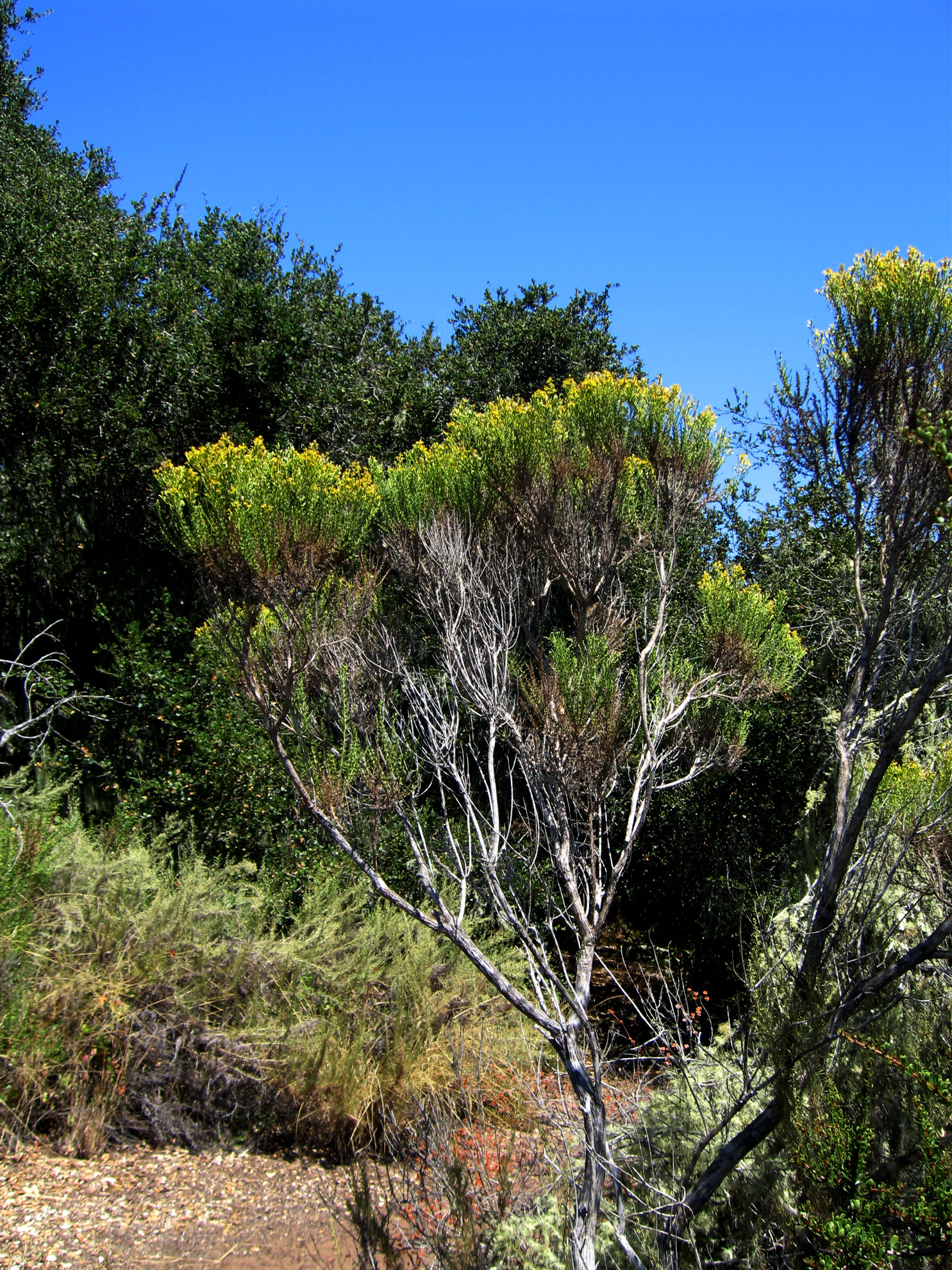
- Mock heather (Ericameria ericoides) in Los Osos Oaks State Natural Reserve.

- Location within California Location within the United States
- Location: San Luis Obispo County, California, United States
- Nearest city: Los Osos, California
- Coordinates: 35°18′23″N 120°48′49″W
- Area: 85 acres (34 ha)
- Established: 1972
- Governing body: California Department of Parks and Recreation

Los Osos Oaks State Natural Reserve is a California State Park in western San Luis Obispo County, in the Central Coast of California region. It preserves centuries-old coast live oaks (Quercus agrifolia) growing atop relict sand dunes. It is located in the Los Osos Valley between San Luis Obispo and Baywood Park-Los Osos, just outside the town of Los Osos. It is also the only place the critically endangered Splitting Yarn or Iron Maiden's Hair lichen Sulcaria isidiifera can be found. The 85-acre (34 ha) park was established in 1972.

== Area history ==
There are several prehistoric sites in the proximate vicinity of the Los Osos Oaks State Natural Reserve, in addition to archaeological recovery within the reserve itself. A significant-sized Chumash site, Los Osos Back Bay, has been partially excavated on a stabilized sand dune slightly to the north of the reserve dating to at least as early as 1200 CE.

== Proposed for closure ==
The reserve was one of several state parks threatened with closure in 2008. After the 2009 California state special elections, in which voters turned down a package of propositions dealing with California budget crisis, Governor Arnold Schwarzenegger proposed the temporary closure (for at least 2 years) of 220 parks. The closures were ultimately avoided by cutting hours and maintenance system-wide.

== See also ==
- California oak woodland
- Elfin Forest Natural Area — in Baywood-Los Osos.
- List of California state parks
- Protected areas of San Luis Obispo County, California
