= Estero Bay (California) =

Bay on the coast of California, United States

Coordinates: 35.39969°N 120.91347°W

Estero Bay (Spanish for "Estuary") is a bay located on the Pacific Coast in San Luis Obispo County, central California. It is about 15 miles (24 km) from its south end at Point Buchon/Montana de Oro State Park, to its north end at Point Estero, which is about 5 miles (8 km) northwest of Cayucos. It is indented about 5 miles (8 km) into the California coast.

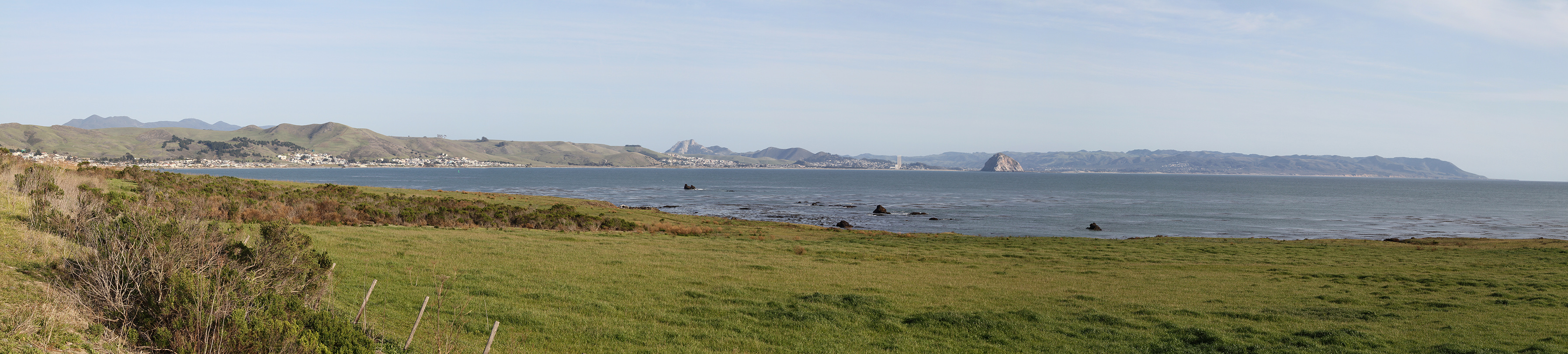
A panoramic view of Estero Bay, California, USA, with the town of Cayucos on the left, Morro Bay/Morro Rock center, and Point Buchon/Montana de Oro State Park on the right.

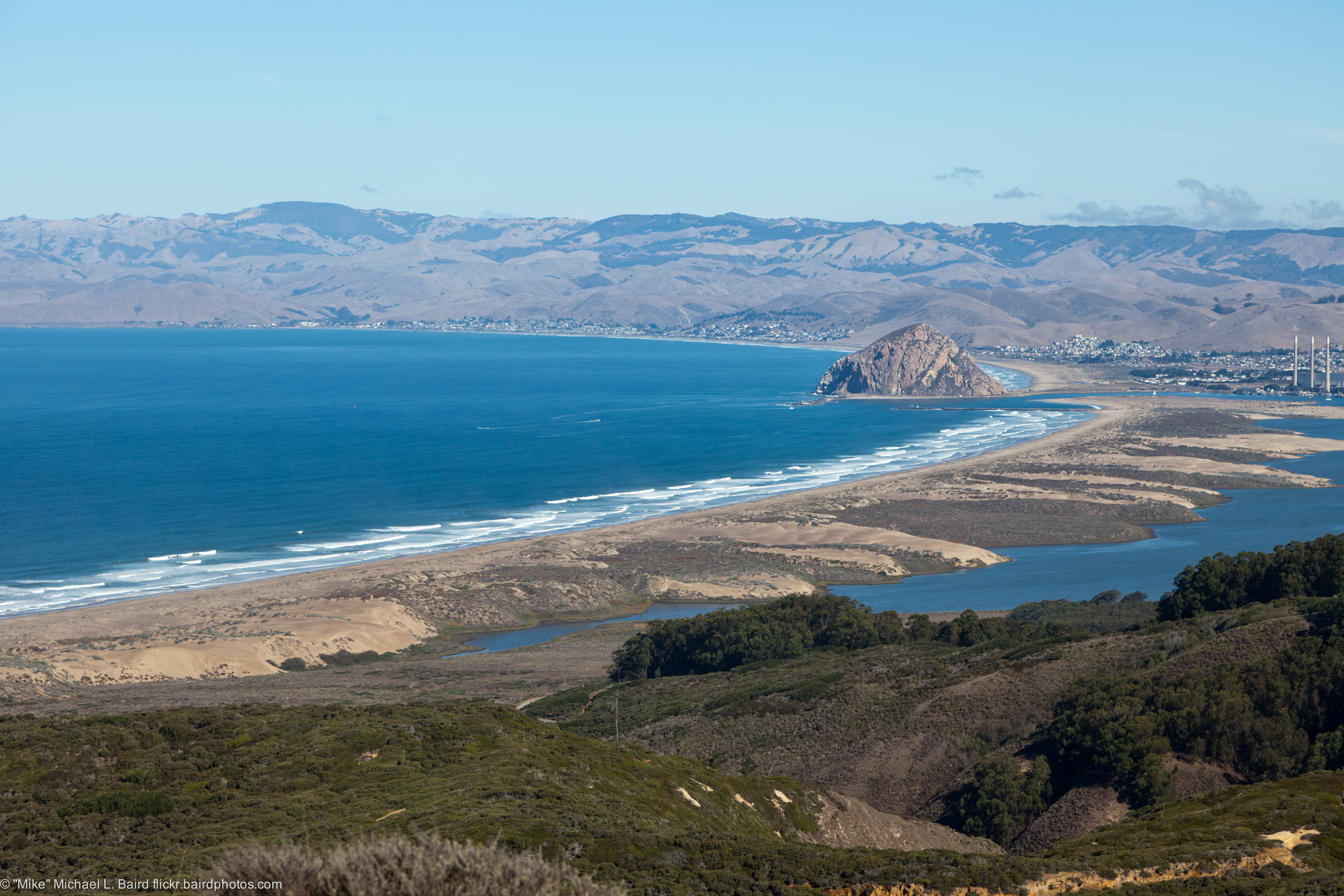
View from Summit of Hazard Peak to Estero Bay, Morro Rock, Morro Bay Estuary, Sandspit, and Towns of Morro Bay and Cayucos. 2011 photo.

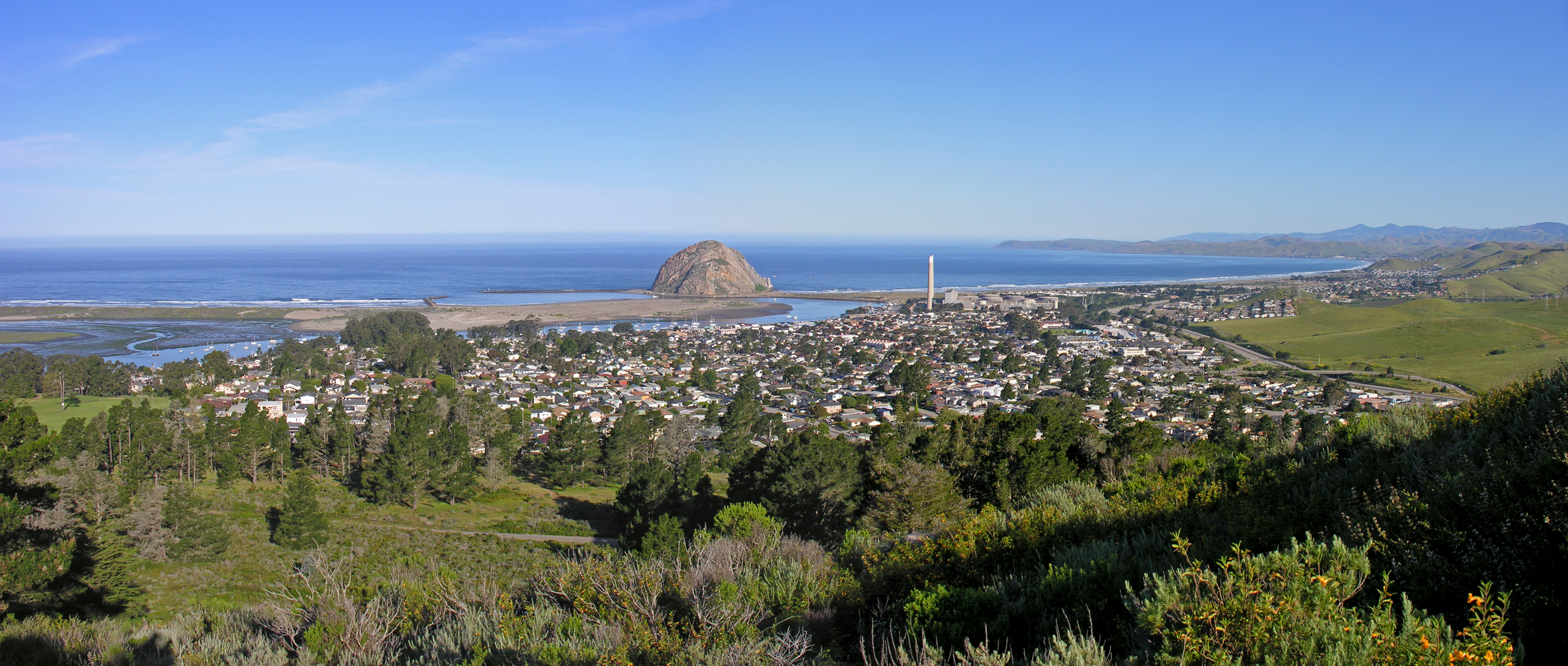
View of the northern 2/3rds of Estero Bay, Morro Rock, and the entrance of Morro Bay, looking West from Black Hill.

== Ecology ==
The Morro Bay kangaroo rat (Dipodomys heermanni morroensis ) is endemic to the Baywood fine sands habitats surrounding Morro Bay. It is a federally listed endangered species and on the IUCN Red List of Critically endangered species.

Morro Bay is located in the center of Estero Bay.

== Features ==
Towns on the bay include Morro Bay, Baywood Park-Los Osos, and Cayucos.

For recreation beaches and parks are along the shore of the bay include:

1. Morro Strand State Beach
2. Morro Bay State Park
3. El Moro Elfin Forest Preserve — a 90-acre grove of 'pygmy oaks' (Coast live oak (Quercus agrifolia ). Located on the southeastern shore of Estero Bay in Los Osos. An oval wooden walkway loops around the forest, with viewing platforms.

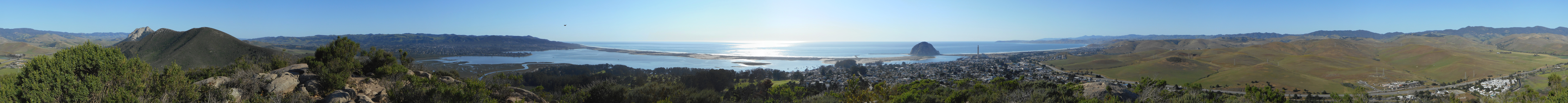
A panoramic view of Estero bay (far side of sandspit), Morro Bay (near side of sandspit), Los Osos, Baywood Park, Chorro Valley, and Hollister Peak, from Black Hill.

== See also ==
- Amphibious Training Base Morro Bay used the bay during World War 2.
- California during World War II
