= Baywood-Los Osos, California =

Unincorporated community in California, United States

- Unincorporated community
- Location in San Luis Obispo County and the state of California
- Coordinates: 35°19′0″N 120°50′8″W
- Country: United States
- State: California
- County: San Luis Obispo

Government
  - Type: County Government

Area
  - Total: 7.6 sq mi (19.7 km^{2})
  - Land: 7.6 sq mi (19.7 km^{2})
  - Water: 0 sq mi (0 km^{2})

Population (2000)
  - Total: 14,351
  - Density: 1,887/sq mi (728.5/km^{2})
- Time zone: UTC-8 (Pacific (PST))
  - Summer (DST): UTC-7 (PDT)
- ZIP codes: 93402, 93412
- Area code: 805
- FIPS code: 06-04541
- GNIS feature ID: 2407812

Baywood-Los Osos (locally known as Los Osos-Baywood Park) is an unincorporated community in western San Luis Obispo County, California, United States. The population was 14,351 in the 2000 census. It includes the communities of Los Osos, which is located near Morro Bay, Baywood Park, and the former community of Cuesta-by-the-Sea.

== Geography and natural history ==
Baywood-Los Osos is located at 35°19′0″N 120°50′8″W (35.316795, -120.835605).

According to the United States Census Bureau, the CDP had a total area of 7.6 square miles (20 km^{2}), of which 99.87% was land and 0.13% was water.

This locale was settled originally by Chumash peoples who developed habitation sites and exploited marine resources for food.

== Demographics ==
Historical population
Census	Pop.	Note	%±
1970	3,487		—
1980	10,933		213.5%
1990	14,377		31.5%
2000	14,351		−0.2%
U.S. Decennial Census; 1850–1870 1880-1890; 1900 1910 1920; 1930 1940 1950; 1960 1970 1980; 1990 2000 2010

Baywood-Los Osos was a census-designated place (CDP) through the 2000 census, but the CDP was abolished before the 2010 census. As of the census of 2000, there were 14,351 persons, 5,892 households, and 3,876 families residing in the CDP. The population density was 1,883.5 inhabitants per square mile (727.2/km^{2}). There were 6,214 housing units at an average density of 815.6 per square mile (314.9/km^{2}). The racial makeup of the CDP was 88.27% White, 0.64% African American, 0.69% Native American, 4.56% Asian, 0.07% Pacific Islander, 2.49% from other races, and 3.28% from two or more races. Hispanic or Latino of any race were 9.00% of the population.

There were 5,892 households, out of which 27.9% had children under the age of 18 living with them, 52.9% were married couples living together, 9.6% had a female householder with no husband present, and 34.2% were non-families. 25.6% of all households were made up of individuals, and 12.2% had someone living alone who was 65 years of age or older. The average household size was 2.42 and the average family size was 2.91.

In the CDP, the population was spread out, with 21.6% under the age of 18, 7.6% from 18 to 24, 24.7% from 25 to 44, 27.1% from 45 to 64, and 19.0% who were 65 years of age or older. The median age was 43 years. For every 100 females, there were 92.3 males. For every 100 females age 18 and over, there were 88.2 males.

The median income for a household in the CDP was $46,558, and the median income for a family was $55,838. Males had a median income of $39,311 versus $31,450 for females. The per capita income for the CDP was $24,838. About 5.0% of families and 8.5% of the population were below the poverty line, including 8.4% of those under age 18 and 5.1% of those age 65 or over.

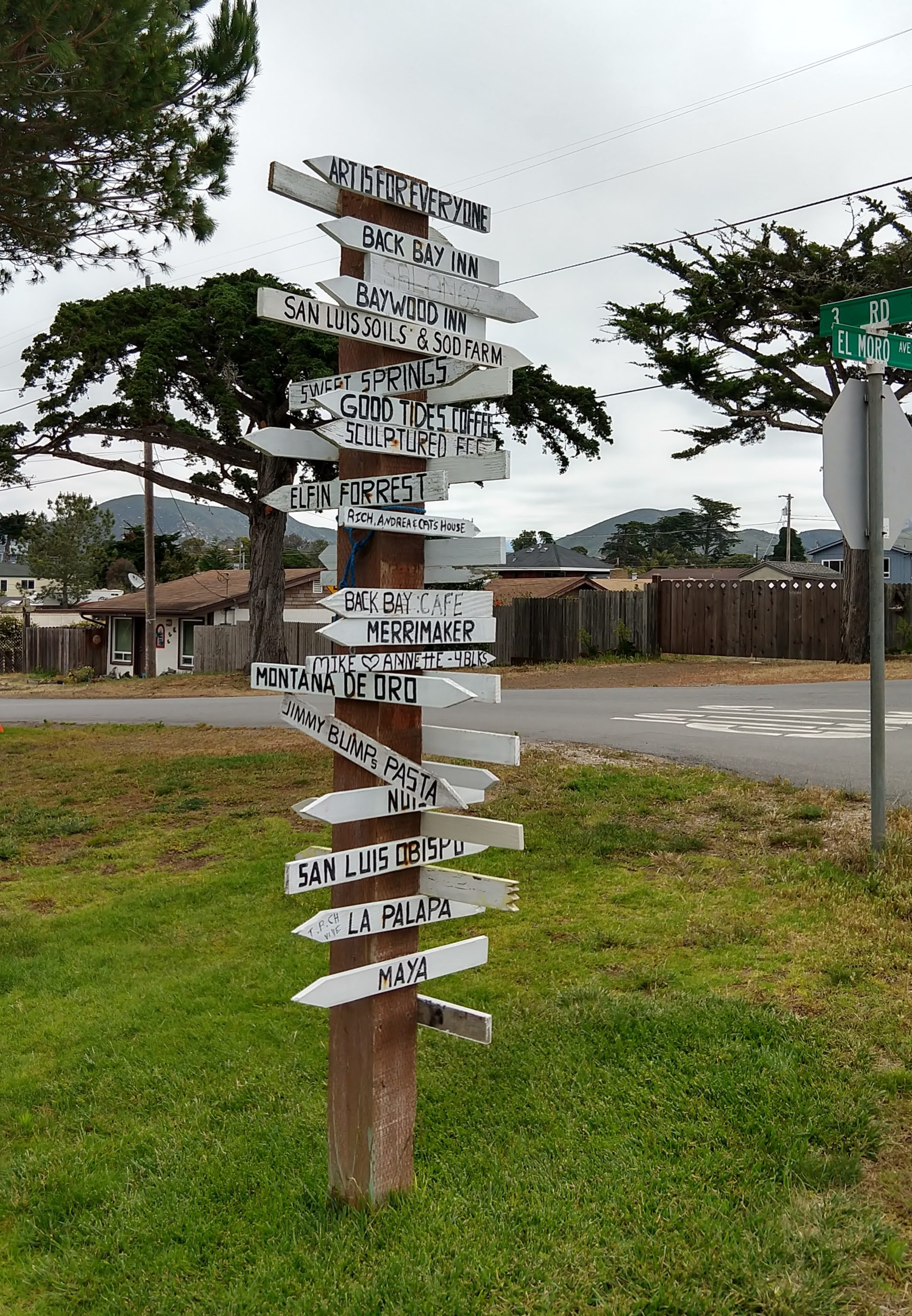
Signpost at 3rd and El Moro in Baywood Park, California

== Politics ==
In the California State Legislature, Baywood-Los Osos is in the 17th senatorial district, represented by Democrat John Laird, and in the 30th Assembly district, represented by Democrat Dawn Addis.

In the United States House of Representatives, Baywood-Los Osos is in California's 24th congressional district, represented by Democrat Salud Carbajal.

== See also ==
- Elfin Forest Natural Area
- Los Osos Oaks State Natural Reserve
- Los Osos, California
- Amphibious Training Base Morro Bay used Baywood-Los Osos during World War 2
