= Land Conservancy of San Luis Obispo County =

Nonprofit organization in California

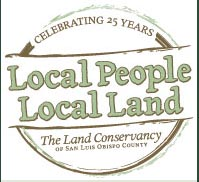
Land Conservancy Logo

The Land Conservancy of San Luis Obispo County (LCSLO) is a non-profit land trust organization that has been operating in San Luis Obispo County, California since 1984. The LCSLO is dedicated to voluntary, collaborative preservation, and improvement of lands that hold significant scenic, agricultural, habitat, and cultural values. Their work aims to benefit both local communities and wildlife.

== Land acquisition, preservation and restoration ==
The objectives of the LCSLO are as follows:

1. Preservation of conservation lands for future generations. The LCSLO aims to safeguard conservation lands to ensure their availability and integrity for the well-being of future communities.
2. Rehabilitation of deteriorated habitat resources to reinstate their ecological advantages to the environment. The LCSLO strives to restore degraded habitats thereby revitalizing their environmental benefits and enhancing the health of the local ecosystem.
3. Implementation of restoration and management practices for conservation lands. The LCSLO is dedicated the restoration and management of conserved lands, ensuring their long-term viability and ecological functionality.

=== Land Preservation and Restoration Projects ===
The LCSLO participates in land preservation, creek restoration, and dune restoration across SLO County. This includes the north coast, San Luis Obispo Creek, Guadalupe-Nipomo Dunes/Black Lake Canyon, as well as Paradise Beach in northern Santa Barbara County.

==== Restoration/Preservation Sites/Programs ====
1. Monterey Pine Forest Protection Program: Since 1986, the LCSLO has acquired more than 400 lots in Cambria with the specific goal of safeguarding one of the rare and endemic Monterey Pine forests along the Pacific Coast.
2. Hidden Springs Farm: Hidden Springs is a family-owned tree farm spanning 55 acres (22 hectares) in Atascadero. The farm contains a combination of agricultural and natural areas, including diverse oak woodlands and a mile-long stretch of Graves Creek. The LCSLO collaborated with the Franks family to preserve the 55-acre property, which was zoned for agriculture and the last of its kind within the City of Atascadero. The LCSLO continues to monitor the site for conservation purposes.
3. Greenbelt Protection Program: Through a partnership with the City of San Luis Obispo, the LCSLO played a role in preserving over 700 acres (283 hectares) of significant landscapes as part of the visionary City Greenbelt Protection Program. The project protects 390 acres (158 hectares) of the Brughelli farm on the south side of town and 315 acres (127 hectares) of Union Pacific Railroad Properties along West Cuesta Ridge on the north side of town (Stenner Springs). The preservation of these agricultural lands near downtown helps safeguard the headwaters that contribute to local tributaries of SLO Creek. Funding for the project included support from the Department of Defense Army Compatible Use Buffer (ACUB) Program with $350,000 provided towards the purchase of the Stenner Springs property.
4. Reservoir Canyon: A streamside property containing a one-mile (1.6 km) stretch of upper San Luis Obispo Creek within a working cattle ranch. The LCSLO restored this site after rains caused severe erosion issues. Restoration efforts included the creation of deep shaded pools to provide habitat for steelhead trout, a federally listed threatened species. Before the restoration work began, over 200 steelhead trout were caught and relocated.
5. Pismo Preserve, Pismo Beach: The LCSLO is involved in the creation of the Pismo Preserve, a 900-acre (364 hectare) regional park in Pismo Beach. The preserve has over 15 miles of multi-use trails for activities such as hiking, cycling, and horseback riding, providing opportunities for outdoor recreation and enjoyment of the natural surroundings.

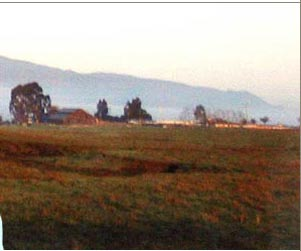
SLO greenbelt land, LCSLO website

== Conservation planning ==
LCSLO, has engaged in policy studies to contribute to decision-making and responsible land use practices. These studies include the City of San Luis Obispo Greenbelt Plan, a Community Separator Study conducted in 2006, an analysis of outdated subdivisions in rural areas in 2007, and collaborations with SLO County's Agricultural Land Conservation Program.

The LCSLO has specific objectives, which are as follows:

1. Prevent poorly planned development: The organization works to discourage haphazard or unsustainable development practices that could negatively impact natural areas and communities.
2. Protect drinking water sources: Recognizing the importance of clean and accessible drinking water, the LCSLO prioritizes efforts to safeguard water sources from pollution and degradation.
3. Promote family farmlands and ranches: The LCSLO supports the preservation and sustainable management of family-owned agricultural lands and ranches, which contribute to the local economy and cultural heritage.
4. Conduct conservation workshops for landowners and financial/estate planning experts: The LCSLO organizes workshops providing landowners with information on conservation practices and collaborating with professionals in financial and estate planning to address related considerations.
5. Collaborate on landowner/rancher workshops with the University of California Cooperative Extension and other groups: The LCSLO forms partnerships with organizations like the University of California Cooperative Extension to develop workshops tailored to the needs of landowners and ranchers, fostering knowledge-sharing and promoting sustainable land management practices.

The LCSLO is currently involved in various planning projects, including:

1. Santa Rosa Creek Watershed Conservation Plan
2. San Luis Obispo Creek Fish Passage Improvement Program
3. San Luis Obispo Creek Watershed Enhancement Plan
4. City of San Luis Obispo Greenbelt Planning Project
5. Nipomo Creek Watershed Management Plan

Through these projects, the LCSLO aims to address conservation and enhancement needs, collaborating with stakeholders to achieve sustainable and resilient watershed management.

== Education and outreach projects ==
The Land Conservancy educates the public on water conservation, riparian protection, and oak habitat support. Activities are designed to:

- Provide information about and access to outdoor areas to help San Luis Obispo community members develop a personal land ethic and connection to the land.
- Provide volunteer opportunities for people to help them better understand the importance of land conservation/restoration while helping the Land Conservancy to achieve its goals.
- Collaboration with Growing Grounds Farms. Clients in Growing Grounds Farm's horticultural therapy program (Transitions-Mental Health Association) visit conservation sites to collect and propagate specimens and plant seedlings. The participants recognize that their efforts have value and that these activities provide a way for them to expand their knowledge and skills while contributing to community conservation efforts.
