= Elfin Forest Natural Area =

Nature reserve in California, United States

Coordinates: 35.3336°N 120.8269°W

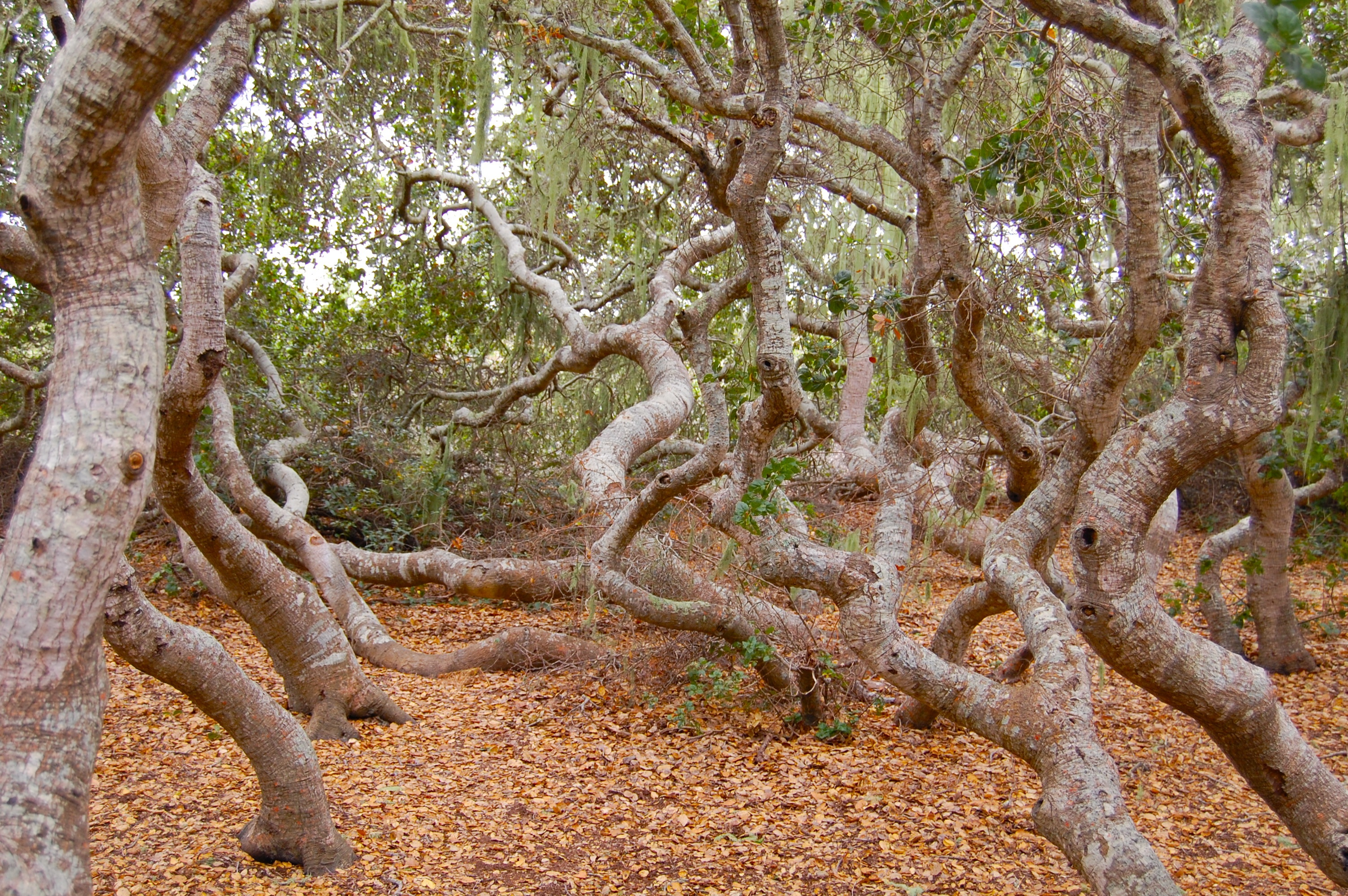
Elfin Forest, pygmy Coast live oaks

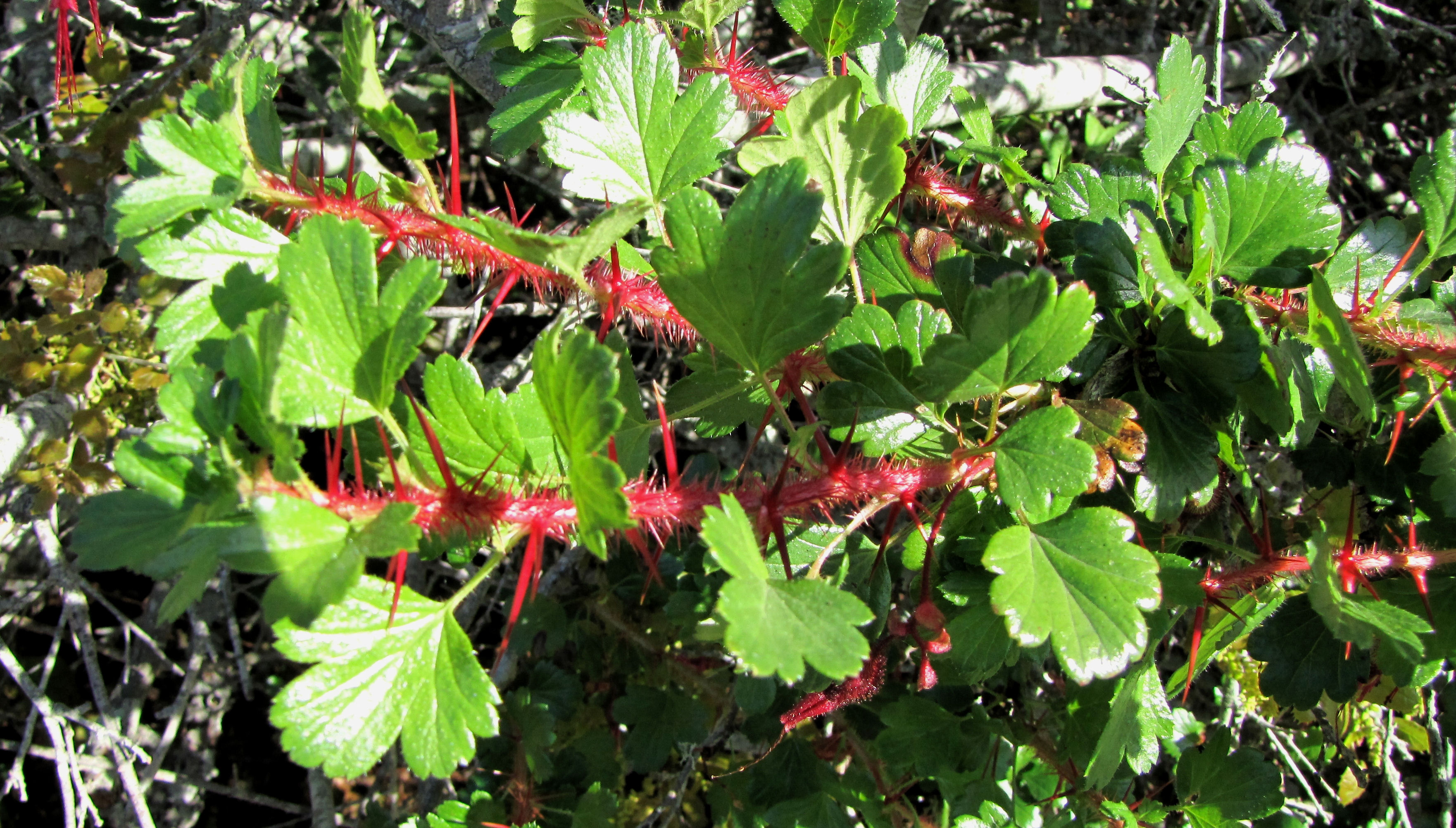
Fuchsia flowered gooseberry (Ribes speciosum), in the El Moro Elfin Forest.

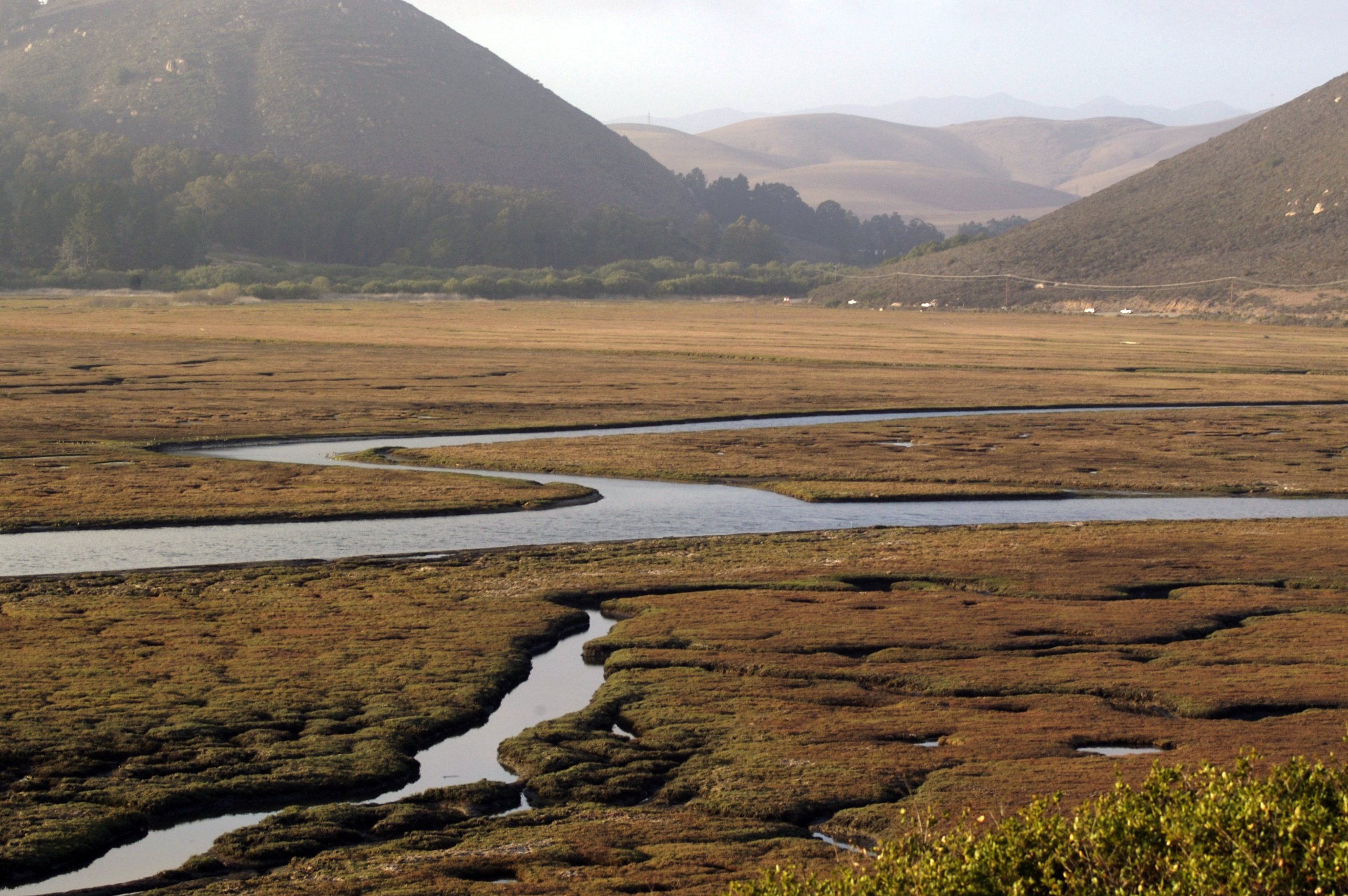
Elfin Forest view to NE, across the salt marsh

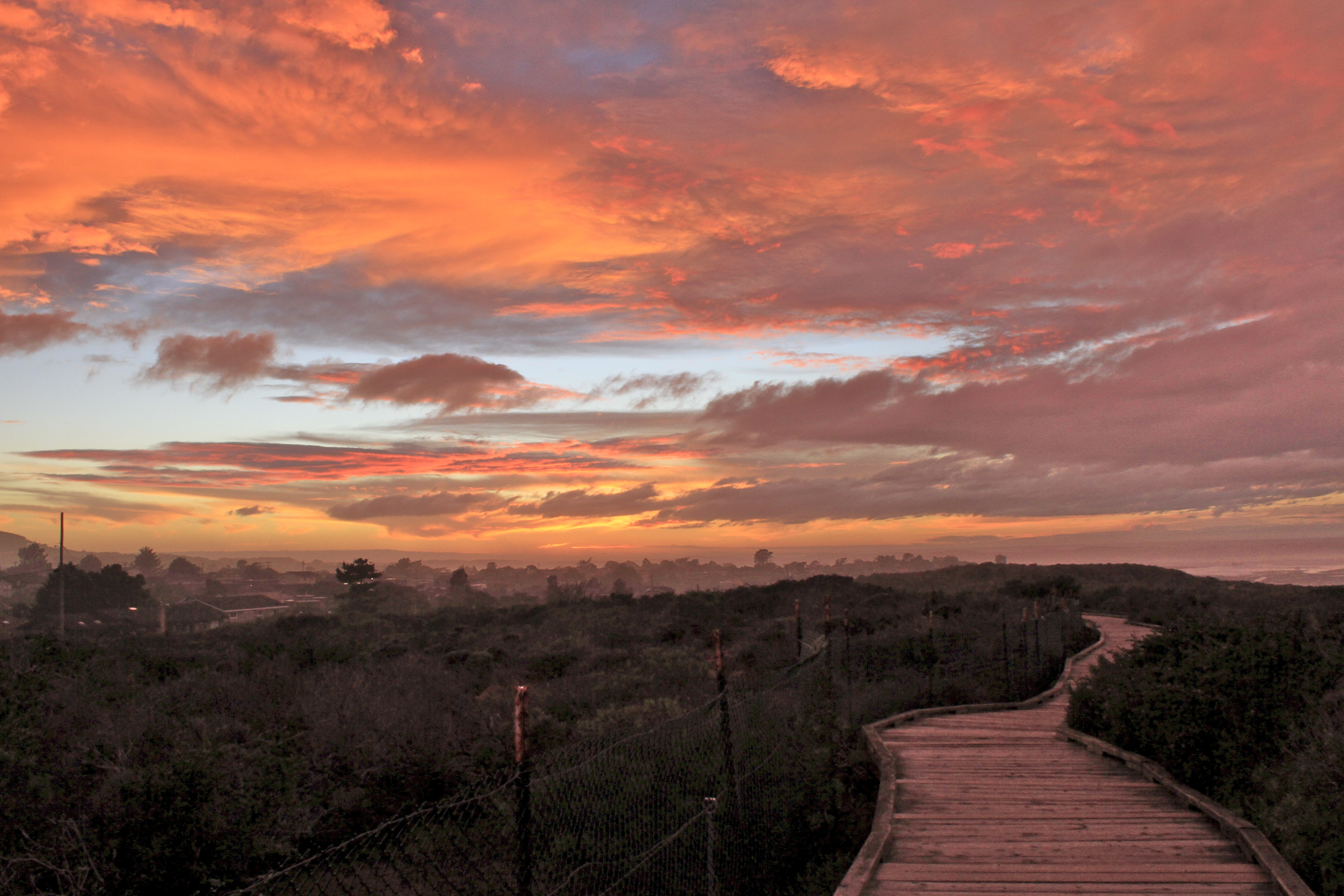
Sunset from the Elfin Forest

The Elfin Forest Natural Area is a nature preserve protecting a unique plant community in Los Osos-Baywood, San Luis Obispo County, central California. It consists of prehistoric sand dunes, rising 150 feet (46 m) above southern Morro Bay, on the north of Los Osos-Baywood.

== Description ==
The Elfin Forest Natural Area covers 90 acres (36 ha) that have been acquired by The Los Osos / Morro Bay Chapter of Small Wilderness Area Preservation (SWAP) since 1988. The land was accepted by and now belongs to San Luis Obispo County Parks and California State Parks. The transfer's acceptance by the agencies was based on ongoing active stewardship by SWAP, which continues to the present day under the new name of Friends of El Moro Elfin Forest. The nature preserve opened to the public in 1994.

=== Natural history ===
The native Coast live oak (Quercus agrifolia) trees compose an elfin forest, in a naturally harsh location with poor soil conditions, salt spray, and constant winds, that have stunted and directed their growth. They now compose a woodland of trees, with the largest between 200 and 400 years old, and range from a height of 20 feet (6.1 m) in sheltered areas to a low of 4 feet (1.2 m) near the tallest ridge line.

There are several other native plants of pygmy forest scale in the nature preserve, also adapted to the harsh habitat, including the locally endemic Morro manzanita (Arctostaphylos morroensis).

Habitats in the nature reserve, within the California coastal sage and chaparral ecoregion, include:

- Coastal sage scrub
- Coastal brackish marsh
- Riparian woodland fringe
- Pygmy oak woodland
- Maritime chaparral
- Coastal dune scrub
- Oak and manzanita complex.

The Elfin Forest supports more than 200 species of plants, 51 species of lichens, as well as 110 kinds of birds, 22 species of mammals, and 13 species of reptiles and amphibians.

=== Access ===
A nearly 1 mile (1.6 km) boardwalk loop, constructed in 1999 to protect the Elfin Forest's sensitive habitats, provides access for wheelchair users. Viewpoint sections along it have expansive overlooks over Morro Bay and the sand dunes spit, and the diverse bird species in the estuary.

== Chumash people ==
In pre-Columbian times, the Chumash people had a significant settlement now named Los Osos Back Bay on a stabilized sand dune to the east of the Elfin Forest. There is a long Chumash midden within the dwarf forest.

== See also ==
- Los Osos Oaks State Natural Reserve — another unique oak woodland forest park, also in Los Osos-Baywood Park.
- Natural history of San Luis Obispo County
