= Rancho San Geronimo (Villavicencio) =

Land grant in California

Coordinates: 35.490°N 120.970°W

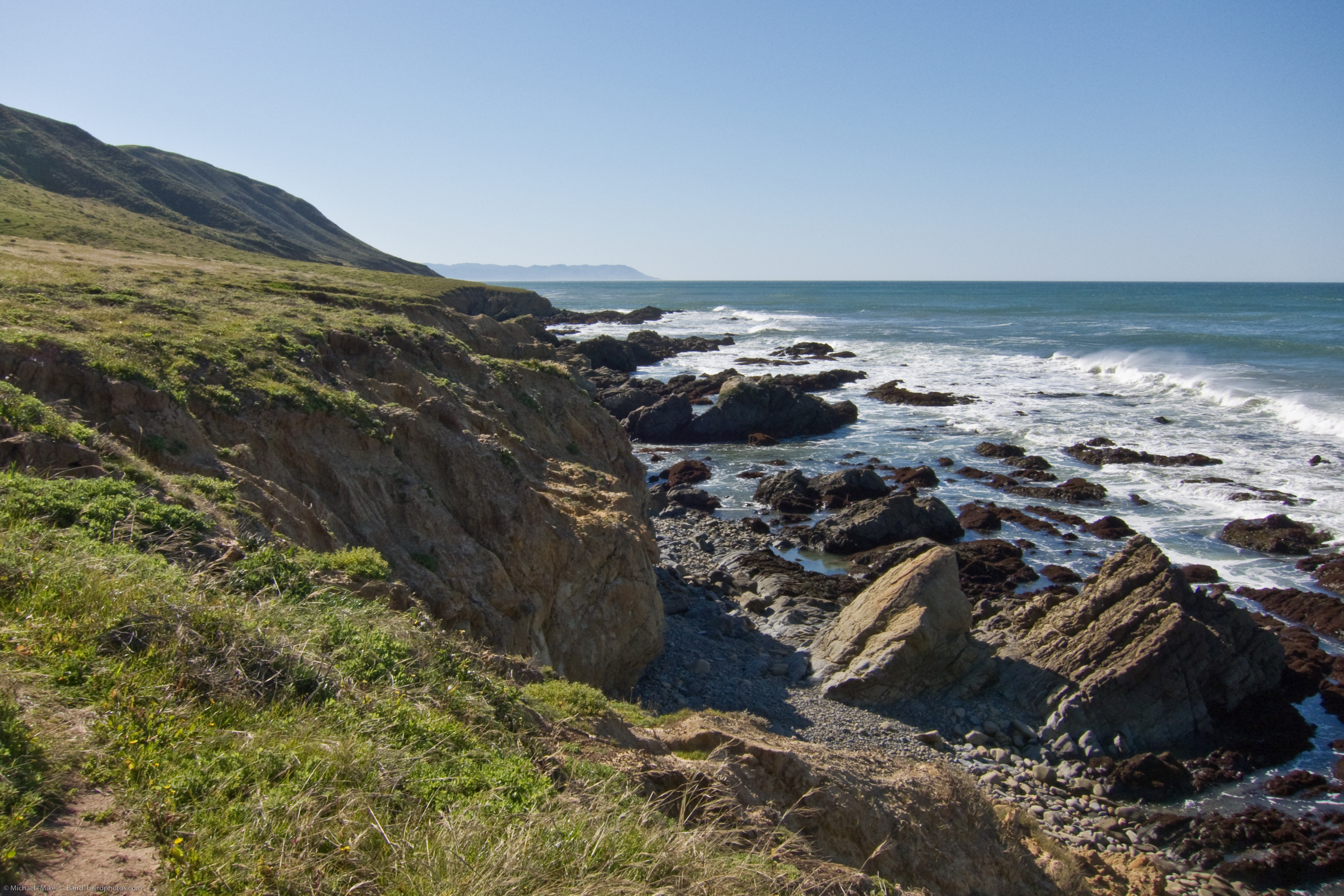
Coastline looking south at Harmony Headlands, on the old Rancho San Geronimo land grant.

Rancho San Geronimo was a 8,893-acre (35.99 km^{2}) Mexican land grant in present-day San Luis Obispo County, California given in 1842 by Governor Juan Alvarado to Rafael Villavicencio. The granted extended along the Pacific coast from south of present-day Harmony to north of Cayucos. Villa Creek, which retains the Villavicencio name, runs through the center of the grant. Rancho Geronimo adjoined Rancho Moro y Cayucos, down coast to the southeast.

== History ==
Rafael José Serapio Villavicencio (1803–1858) was the second son of José Antonio Villavicencio (1777–1817) and María Serafina Espinosa (1781–1870). Rafael Villavicencio married María Ramona Louisa Armas in 1829. In 1842 Rafael received the two square league Rancho San Gerónimo. Rafael, Ramona and five children moved to Rancho San Geronimo, and Rafael built a large adobe house.

With the cession of California to the United States following the Mexican-American War, the 1848 Treaty of Guadalupe Hidalgo provided that the land grants would be honored. As required by the Land Act of 1851, a claim for Rancho San Geronimo was filed with the Public Land Commission in 1852, and the grant was patented to Rafael Villavicencio in 1876.

After the death of Rafael, Roberto (1835–1917) who was their third child, inherited most of San Geronimo. Roberto married Maria Guadalupe Higuera in 1843. Roberto shortened the family name to Villa. In 1865, the rancho was sold to Wesley Burnett (1818–1905) from Indiana. In 1880, James H. Blackburn (1820–1888) of Rancho Paso de Robles bought the rancho.

== See also ==
- Estero Bluffs State Park, which was part of Rancho San Geronimo
- Harmony Headlands State Park, also part of Rancho San Geronimo
- Ranchos of California
- List of Ranchos of California
