= Henry Cox (disambiguation) =

Henry Cox (1832–?) was a member of the Virginia House of Delegates in the 1870s.

Henry Cox may also refer to:

- Henry Cox (Castlemartyr MP), member of Parliament for Castlemartyr (Parliament of Ireland constituency) from 1787 to 1790
- Henry Cox (landowner), founder of Glenmore Park, New South Wales, in 1825
- Henry Cox (musical director), founding musical director of Omaha Symphony Orchestra, 1921–1924
- Henry Cox (engineer), American engineer, see List of members of the National Academy of Engineering

== See also ==
- Henry Coxe (1811–1881), English librarian and scholar
- Henry Hippisley Coxe (1748–1795), English politician
- Henry Cocks, former United States marine who owned Rancho San Bernabe from 1853 to 1866
- Sir Henry Cocke (1538–1610), English courtier and member of Parliament
- Harry Cox (disambiguation)
