= Harold Cox (disambiguation) =

Harold Cox (1859–1936) was an English politician.

Harold Cox may also refer to:

- Roxbee Cox, Baron Kings Norton (Harold Roxbee Cox, 1902–1997), British aeronautical engineer
- Harold E. Cox (1931–2021), American historian

== See also ==
- William Harold Cox (1901–1988), U.S. federal judge from Mississippi
- Harry Cox (disambiguation)
