= Rancho Santa Ysabel (Arce) =

Land grant in California

Coordinates: 35.600°N 120.650°W

Rancho Santa Ysabel was a 17,774-acre (7,193 ha) Mexican land grant in present-day San Luis Obispo County, California given in 1844 by Governor Manuel Micheltorena to Francisco Arce. The grant was southeast of present-day Paso Robles, between the Salinas River on the west and Huerhuero Creek on the east.

== History ==
Francisco Casimiro Arce (1821–1878) came as a boy to Monterey in 1833. He was a Mexican cavalry officer, and secretary to General José Castro. He was granted the four square league, former Mission San Miguel Arcángel lands, Rancho Santa Ysabel in 1844. In 1846, a small group of resident Americans captured, from Lieutenant Arce, a band of horses being taken to General Castro. The taking of these horses was the first stroke of an insurgency which came to be called the Bear Flag Revolt. Arce left California with José Castro in 1846.

With the cession of California to the United States following the Mexican-American War, the 1848 Treaty of Guadalupe Hidalgo provided that the land grants would be honored. As required by the Land Act of 1851, a claim for Rancho Santa Ysabel was filed with the Public Land Commission in 1852, and the grant was patented to Francisco Arce in 1866.

Arce sold parts of the rancho to Jeremiah Clark in 1853, to Manual Castro in 1855, to Theodoro Gonzales in 1859, and to Maurice Dore 1874. Francisco Arce died in 1878. Chauncey Hatch Phillips bought Rancho Santa Ysabel in 1886, and subdivided it to be sold as farm lots to individuals ready to settle in the area being opened up by the arrival of the railroad.

== Chauncey Hatch Phillips ==
Chauncey Hatch Phillips (1837–1902) was a San Luis Obispo real estate developer who acquired, subdivided and sold a number of Mexican land grants. Phillips was born in Ohio and in 1862 married Jane Woods in Wisconsin. In 1864, leaving his wife and child behind, Phillips came to Napa as a teacher. He entered a law office and studied law. From 1865 to 1870, he worked for the Internal Revenue Service. In 1871 he moved to San Luis Obispo, and opened a bank. In 1875, he purchased Rancho Moro y Cayucos, and laid out the town of Cayucos. In 1878, he retired from the bank, to devote his time to real estate ventures. In 1882, he made arrangements with Steele Brothers to sell their lands on the Rancho Corral de Piedra, Rancho Bolsa de Chamisal, Rancho Arroyo Grande, and Rancho Pismo. In 1883 Phillips bought and sold Rancho San Miguelito. In 1886, Phillips founded the West Coast Land Company.

== See also ==
- Ranchos of California
- List of Ranchos of California
