= Harmony Headlands State Park =

Undeveloped section of Pacific coast in California, U.S.

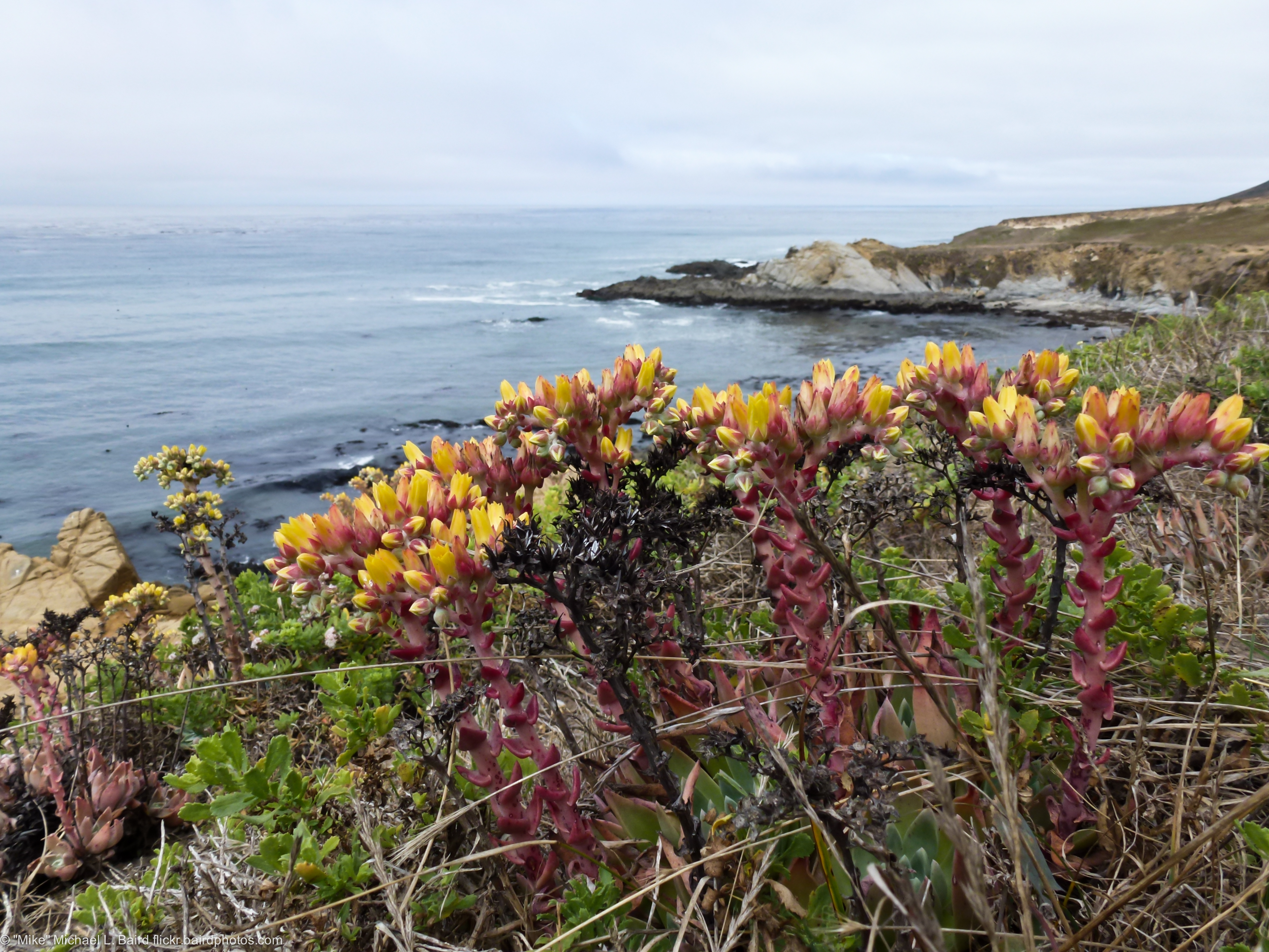
- Dudleya blooming in Harmony Headlands State Park

- Location within California Location within the United States
- Location: San Luis Obispo County, California, United States
- Nearest city: Cayucos, California
- Coordinates: 35°28′40″N 120°59′33″W
- Area: 748 acres (303 ha)
- Established: 2003; 23 years ago
- Governing body: California Department of Parks and Recreation

Harmony Headlands State Park preserves an undeveloped parcel of Pacific coast in California, United States. Located in San Luis Obispo County on Highway 1, the park is the only public access to the coast between the towns of Cayucos and Harmony. The 748-acre (303 ha) park was established in 2003. The Cayucos Land Conservancy helped facilitate and fund the park's development.

Harmony Headlands State Park is open for day-use only. Dogs and bikes are not allowed on the trails. Amenities are limited to a small parking area, portable toilet, and a 1.5-mile (2.4 km) trail. The trail leads through a marine terrace grassland with views of the Pacific Ocean. Volunteers provide assistance and interpretation in the unstaffed park.

== History ==
The state park is within Rancho San Geronimo, an 1842 Mexican land grant. In 1865 an American settler bought the Rancho, and it passed through various owners until the Storni family bought a 750-acre (300 ha) parcel in 1912. The Stornis operated a dairy farm here until the mid 1960s. In 1975 the Storni Ranch was sold to developers, who planned to subdivide the property into home sites. The project fell through, and the property was then bought by the American Land Conservancy in 2003, who in turn sold it to California State Parks. However bureaucratic difficulties delayed opening the park to the public until November 2008. The Cayucos Land Conservancy facilitated overcoming the issues including providing funding for the park's development.

== See also ==
- List of California state parks
