= Rancho San Benito =

Mexican land grant in California

Coordinates: 36.160°N 121.030°W

Rancho San Benito was a 6,671-acre (27.00 km^{2}) Mexican land grant in the Salinas Valley, in present-day Monterey County, California given in 1842 by Governor Juan B. Alvarado to Francisco Garcia. The grant extended along the Salinas River south of Rancho San Bernardo. Present day San Lucas is within the boundaries of the grant.

== History ==
Francisco Garcia received one and half square leagues, and built an adobe house.

James Watson (1800–1863), born in Scotland, arrived by ship from the Sandwich Islands in Santa Barbara in 1824, and went to Monterey. He established a hide and tallow business, and married Mariana Escamilla (1805–1871) in 1830. In 1850, Garcia sold Rancho San Benito to James Watson. With the cession of California to the United States following the Mexican-American War, the 1848 Treaty of Guadalupe Hidalgo provided that the land grants would be honored. As required by the Land Act of 1851, a claim for Rancho San Benito was filed with the Public Land Commission in 1853, and the grant was patented to James Watson in 1869.

Watson sold Rancho San Benito to Alberto Trescony of the adjacent Rancho San Lucas in 1885.

== See also ==
- Ranchos of California
- List of Ranchos of California
