= Rancho Los Corralitos =

Mexican land grant in California

Coordinates: 36.990°N 121.800°W

Rancho Los Corralitos was a 15,440-acre (62.5 km^{2}) Mexican land grant in present-day Santa Cruz County, California given in 1823 by Governor Luis Antonio Argüello, with a confirmatory grant in 1844 by Governor Manuel Micheltorena to José Amesti. "Los Corralitos" means "the little corrals" in Spanish. The grant extended along Corralitos Creek north of Watsonville, and encompassed present-day Corralitos and Amesti.

== History ==
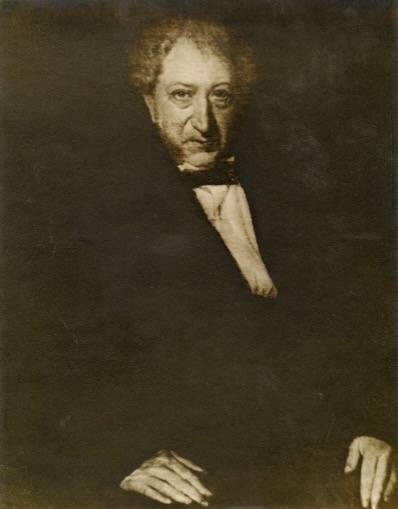
Jose Amesti (1788-1855)

Jose Amesti (1788–1855), a Spanish Basque, came to Monterey on the "Panther" in 1822, and married María Prudenciana Vallejo (1805–1883), sister of Mariano Guadalupe Vallejo, in 1823. Jose Amesti built the two-story adobe, Casa Amesti, in Monterey. Amesti was Alcalde of Monterey in 1844. Amesti leased portions of the four square league Rancho Los Corralitos for timber cutting, and established his own Lumber mill on the upper portion of the rancho. Jose Amesti and his wife Pudenciana Vallejo de Amesti had four daughters: Maria del Carmen Josefa Antonia Amesti (1824–1901) who married in 1848 James McKinley, who was the patentee of Rancho San Lucas and Rancho Moro y Cayucos; Maria Santa Epitacia (1826–1887); Maria Bernardina Celedonia Carmel (1828–1916); and niece Tomasa Madariaga y Vallejo, who was adopted.

With the cession of California to the United States following the Mexican-American War, the 1848 Treaty of Guadalupe Hidalgo provided that the land grants would be honored. As required by the Land Act of 1851, claims for Rancho Los Corralitos were filed with the Public Land Commission in 1852, and the grant was patented to José Amesti in 1861.

After the patent was issued, there was a boundary dispute with José Joaquín Castro's Rancho San Andrés which adjoined Rancho Los Corralitos on the west.
