= Amesti, California =

Amesti Watsonville
- Unincorporated Community; Census Designated Place
- Location in Santa Cruz County and the state of California

- Location in the United States
- Coordinates: 36°57′33″N 121°46′56″W
- Country: United States
- State: California
- County: Santa Cruz

Area
  - Total: 3.00 sq mi (7.78 km^{2})
  - Land: 2.94 sq mi (7.61 km^{2})
  - Water: 0.066 sq mi (0.17 km^{2}) 2.10%
- Elevation: 148 ft (45 m)

Population (2020)
  - Total: 2,637
  - Density: 897.2/sq mi (346.42/km^{2})
- Time zone: UTC-8 (PST)
  - Summer (DST): UTC-7 (PDT)
- ZIP code: 95076
- Area code: 831
- FIPS code: 06-01651
- GNIS feature ID: 1853375

Amesti is a census-designated place (CDP) in Santa Cruz County, California, United States. The population was 2,637 as of the 2020 United States census.

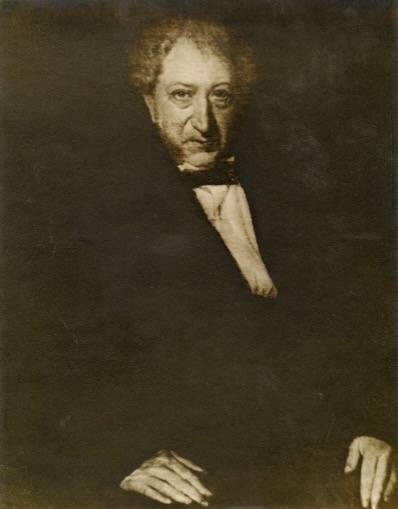
Jose Amesti (1788–1855)

Amesti is named for José Amesti, a Basque who came to California in 1822, and who was the grantee of Rancho Los Corralitos.

== Geography ==
Amesti is located at 36°57′33″N 121°46′56″W (36.959210, -121.782131).

According to the United States Census Bureau, the CDP has a total area of 3.0 square miles (7.8 km^{2}), of which 2.9 square miles (7.5 km^{2}) is land and 0.1 square miles (0.26 km^{2}) (2.13%) is water.

== Demographics ==
Historical population
Census	Pop.	Note	%±
2000	2,436		—
2010	3,478		42.8%
2020	2,637		−24.2%
U.S. Decennial Census; 1860–1870 1880-1890; 1900 1910 1920; 1930 1940 1950; 1960 1970 1980; 1990 2000 2010; 2020

Amesti first appeared as a census designated place in the 2000 U.S. census.

=== Racial and ethnic composition ===
Amesti CDP, California – Racial and ethnic composition Note: the US Census treats Hispanic/Latino as an ethnic category. This table excludes Latinos from the racial categories and assigns them to a separate category. Hispanics/Latinos may be of any race.
Race / Ethnicity (NH = Non-Hispanic)	Pop 2000	Pop 2010	Pop 2020	% 2000	% 2010	% 2020
White alone (NH)	1,271	1,063	940	52.18%	30.56%	35.65%
Black or African American alone (NH)	7	9	3	0.29%	0.26%	0.11%
Native American or Alaska Native alone (NH)	13	17	5	0.53%	0.49%	0.19%
Asian alone (NH)	51	75	39	2.09%	2.16%	1.48%
Native Hawaiian or Pacific Islander alone (NH)	1	1	3	0.04%	0.03%	0.11%
Other race alone (NH)	6	1	2	0.25%	0.03%	0.08%
Mixed race or Multiracial (NH)	47	39	81	1.93%	1.12%	3.07%
Hispanic or Latino (any race)	1,040	2,273	1,564	42.69%	65.35%	59.31%
Total	2,436	3,478	2,637	100.00%	100.00%	100.00%

=== 2020 census ===
As of the 2020 census, Amesti had a population of 2,637 and a population density of 897.2 inhabitants per square mile (346.4/km^{2}). The median age was 37.6 years. 23.1% of residents were under the age of 18 and 16.9% were 65 years of age or older. For every 100 females, there were 101.8 males, and for every 100 females age 18 and over, there were 98.1 males age 18 and over.

The census reported that 99.1% of the population lived in households and 0.9% lived in non-institutionalized group quarters. 80.1% of residents lived in urban areas, while 19.9% lived in rural areas.

There were 806 households, of which 40.7% had children under the age of 18 living in them. Of all households, 55.5% were married-couple households, 6.2% were cohabiting couple households, 12.5% were households with a male householder and no spouse or partner present, and 25.8% were households with a female householder and no spouse or partner present. About 15.6% of all households were made up of individuals and 7.8% had someone living alone who was 65 years of age or older. The average household size was 3.24. There were 634 families (78.7% of all households).

There were 824 housing units at an average density of 280.4 units per square mile (108.3 units/km^{2}), of which 806 (97.8%) were occupied. Of occupied units, 71.6% were owner-occupied and 28.4% were occupied by renters. 2.2% of housing units were vacant. The homeowner vacancy rate was 0.3% and the rental vacancy rate was 1.3%.

=== Income and poverty ===
In 2023, the US Census Bureau estimated that the median household income was $102,083, and the per capita income was $41,683. About 9.6% of families and 14.1% of the population were below the poverty line.

== Government ==
In the California State Legislature, Amesti is in the 17th senatorial district, represented by Democrat John Laird, and in the 29th Assembly district, represented by Democrat Robert Rivas.

In the United States House of Representatives, Amesti is in California's 18th congressional district, represented by Democrat Zoe Lofgren.
