= Rancho San Bernabe =

Mexican land grant in California

Coordinates: 36.180°N 121.100°W

Rancho San Bernabe was a 13,297-acre (53.81 km^{2}) Mexican land grant in the Salinas Valley, in present-day Monterey County, California.

The three-square-league grant consisted of one square league granted in 1841 to Jesus Molina, and an additional two square leagues granted in 1842 to Petronilo Ríos, by Governor Juan Alvarado. The grant extended along the Salinas River south of present-day King City, California.

== History ==
The Rancho San Bernabe land grants were given to Jesus Molina in 1841 and to Petronilo Ríos in 1842. Petronilo Ríos (1806–1870) was a Mexican soldier who came to California in the mid-1820s. He married Catarina Avila (1812–1889) in 1832. In the 1830s Ríos was shuttling between Monterey and Mission San Miguel Arcángel, where he was corporal commanding the mission guard. In 1839, he was promoted to commander of artillery at the presidio in Monterey, and retired from the military in 1840. In 1842 Ríos bought the Molina land grant and moved his family to Rancho San Bernabe. The Ríos family began raising cattle and crops on this land and producing wine from their own grapes. In 1845 Petronilo Ríos bought Rancho Paso de Robles near Mission San Miguel and moved there with his family.

Henry Cocks, an English marine on the USS Dale, settled in Monterey after 1848 and married a daughter of Francisco Garcia grantee of Rancho San Benito, directly south of Rancho San Bernabe. Cocks moved to Rancho San Bernabe in 1853.

With the cession of California to the United States following the Mexican-American War, the 1848 Treaty of Guadalupe Hidalgo provided that the land grants would be honored. As required by the Land Act of 1851, a claim was filed with the Public Land Commission in 1853, and the grant was patented to Henry Cocks in 1873.

After the droughts of 1863-64, Henry Cocks sold the rancho in 1866.
