= Estero Bluffs State Park =

State park in San Luis Obispo County, California, United States

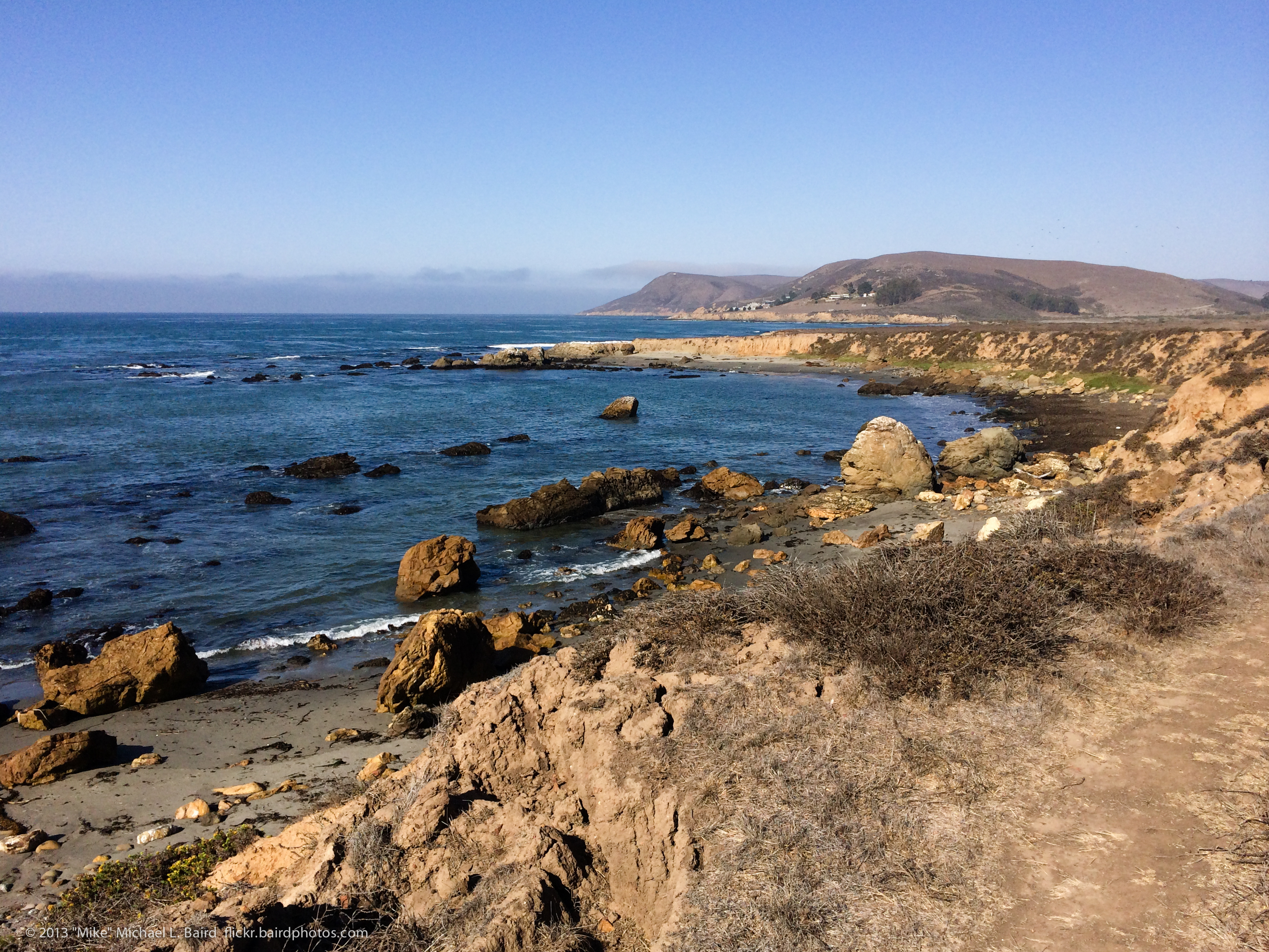
- Estero Bluffs State Park

- Location within California Location within the United States
- Location: San Luis Obispo County, California, USA
- Nearest city: Cayucos, California
- Coordinates: 35°26′53″N 120°55′55″W
- Area: 353 acres (143 ha)
- Established: 2000
- Governing body: California Department of Parks and Recreation

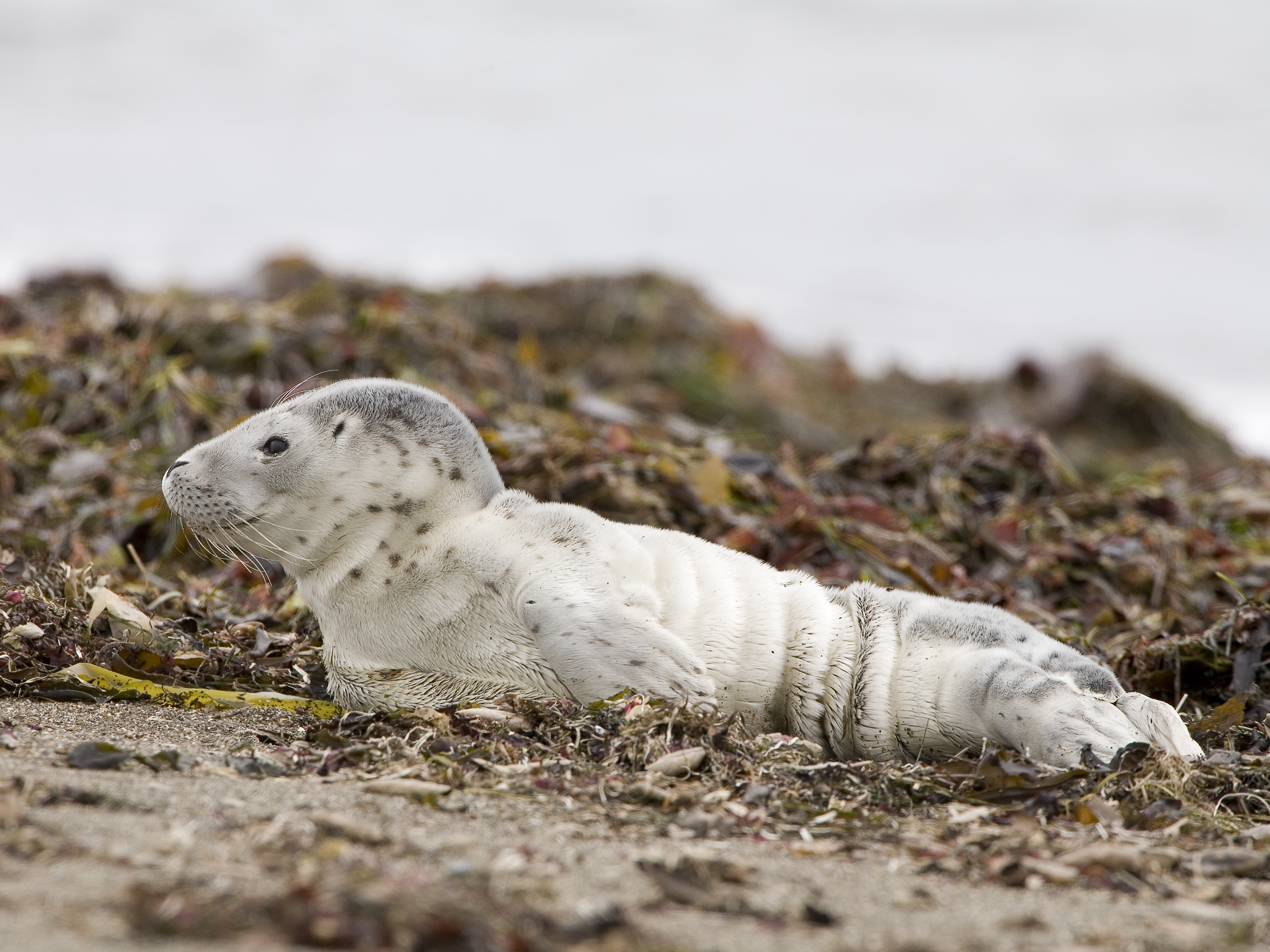
Young harbor seal pup at Villa Creek, Estero Bluffs

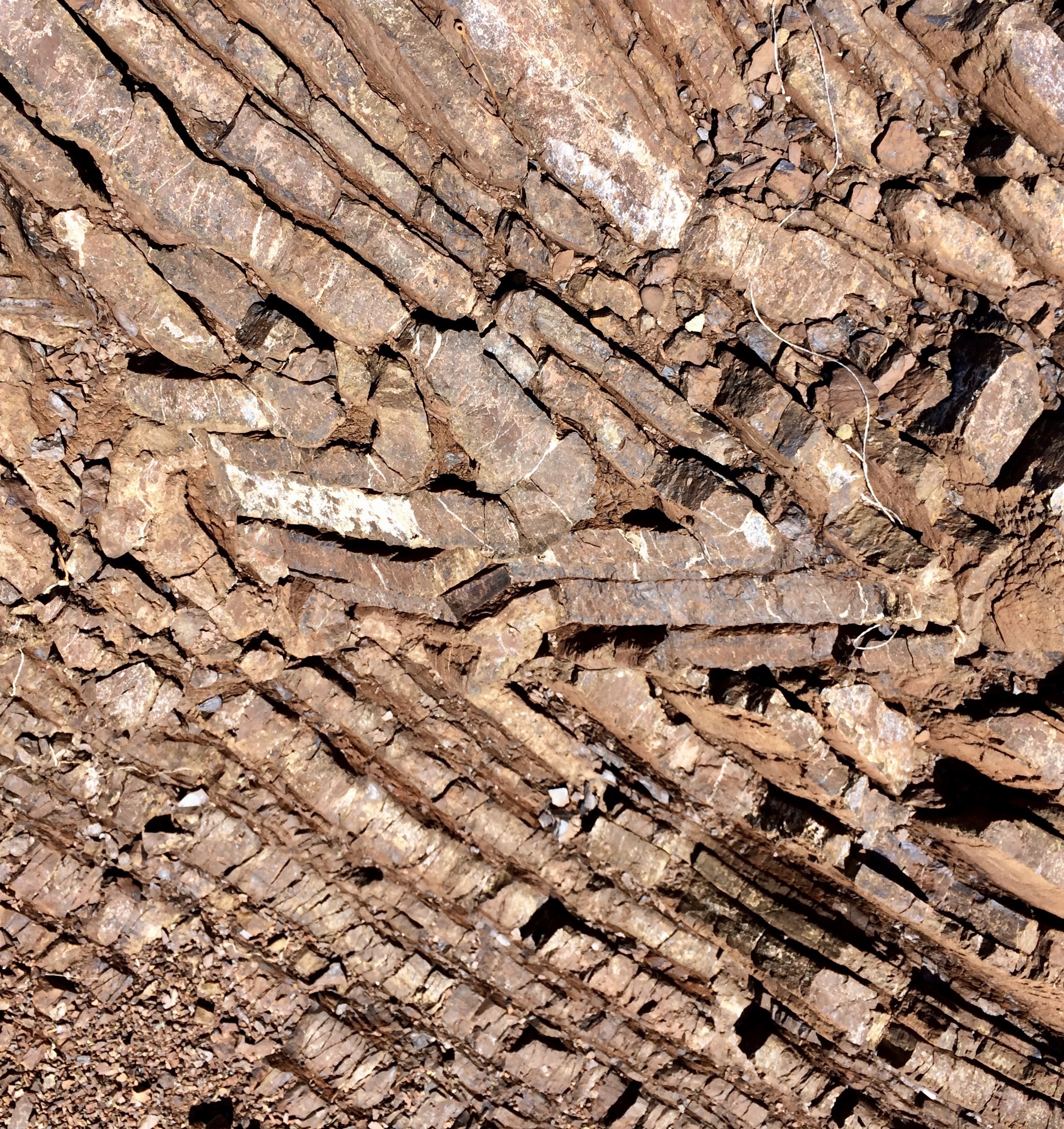
Tight fold in radiolarian chert, a deep-water marine rock and one of the diagnostic rock types in the Franciscan Assemblage. This Estero Bluffs outcrop is likely Cretaceous in age.

Estero Bluffs State Park is a state park of California, United States, on Estero Bay. The park protects a grassland-dominated marine terrace that slopes from California State Route 1 to the Pacific Ocean. The property is crossed by San Geronimo and Villa Creeks and is just north of the town of Cayucos. The 353-acre (143 ha) park was established in 2000.

Estero Bluffs has intertidal areas, wetlands, low bluffs, and coastal terraces punctuated by a number of perennial and intermittent streams and containing a pocket cove and beach at Villa Creek. The park provides habitat for a number of endangered species, including the snowy plover.

The park is made up of a coastline that stretches over 4 miles and covers more than 300 acres of land. Though the shoreline is usually no more than 300 yards away from the highway, the intentional lack of development of the land has left it very similar to its natural state.

Estero Bluffs features a variety of scenic sites along its coast. Visitors can park and see San Geronimo Creek or Villa Creek, which are small lagoons that are present year-round and filled by a constantly running creek. There are also multiple lookout points, including Cayoucos Point, Estero Bay.

== History ==
The Estero Bluffs area has been home to the Native American Chumash and Salinan people for over 10,000 years. They used various resources gathered from marine and terrestrial areas of the region in order to adapt to various environmental changes. In 1769, the Spanish Portola expedition passed by here. With the explorers came various European diseases that killed many of the indigenous people.

From 1771 onward the area, which was Mission land, was used for cattle grazing. In 1842 Mexico granted Rancho San Geronimo, which includes much of the present-day Estero Bluffs State Park, to Rafael José Serapio Villavicencio. The land then passed through various owners until Abram Muscio bought it to develop a resort and residential subdivision. The people from surrounding communities opposed the project, and pushed for preservation. The Trust for Public Land bought the property in 2000, and deeded it to California State Parks in 2002. The Trust imposed a conservation easement that limits and prohibits certain activities on the land, such as the construction of public restrooms or the use of running water.

== Geology ==
The park's foundation is built from rocks of the Franciscan Assemblage which dates back to around 140 million years, placing its formation sometime during the late Jurassic Period. Due to a shifting of tectonic plates, the land was raised above sea level to create the seaside cliffs that can be observed today.

== Plants and wildlife ==
This area is home to several terrains, each of which has its own local plant life. The coastal scrubs and grasslands feature sagebrush and native flowers. The rocky outcrops are marked by wild grasses and seasonal wildflowers. The dunes and wetlands often overlap and yield vegetation and salt grass. Estero Bluffs has very rich marine and terrestrial wildlife populations. In the ocean, the harbor seal and sea otter, a threatened species, utilize the intertidal areas for resting and foraging. From December to March, migrating whales pass through the area, gray whales in particular. Rabbits, ground squirrels, striped skunks and other rodents call the grasslands and coastal scrub of the park home. The grasslands also contain black-bellied slender salamanders, California kingsnakes, Pacific tree frogs, rattlesnakes and insects. The park hosts a variety of birds including the rare western snowy plover.

== See also ==
- List of beaches in California
- List of California state parks
