= Harry Cox (disambiguation) =

Harry Cox (1885–1971) was an English singer.

Harry Cox may also refer to:

- Harry Cox (politician) (1874–1950), Canadian politician
- Harry Cox (footballer) (1884–1946), Australian footballer
- Harry Cox, character in Big Money Hustlas
- "Happy" Harry Cox, character in Everything You Know Is Wrong

== See also ==
- Henry Cox (disambiguation)
- Harold Cox (disambiguation)
