= Rancho San Lucas =

Mexican land grant in California

- U.S. National Register of Historic Places
- U.S. Historic district
- Location within California Location within the United States
- Location: 1 3/4 mi. SW of jct. of Paris Valley Rd. and Rancho San Lucas entry rd., San Lucas, California
- Coordinates: 36°2′34″N 121°0′27″W
- Area: 3,600 acres (1,500 ha)
- Built: 1865
- Architect: Trescony, Catherine
- Architectural style: Transverse adobe barn
- NRHP reference No.: 91000530
- Added to NRHP: May 06, 1991

Rancho San Lucas was a 8,875-acre (35.92 km^{2}) Mexican land grant in the Salinas Valley, in present-day Monterey County, California given in 1842 by Governor Juan B. Alvarado to Rafael Estrada. The grant extended along the west bank of the Salinas River south of present-day San Lucas. It remains an operating ranch.

== History ==
José Rafael Estrada, son of José Raymundo Estrada and Josefa Maria Vallejo de Alvarado, received the grant of the San Lucas for two square leagues in 1842. Rafael Estrada was a half brother of Governor Juan Alvarado.

Estrada sold Rancho San Lucas to James McKinley. Captain James McKinley, a Scottish sailor, arrived at Monterey in the 1820s and became a successful trader. In 1843, he was involved in a trading business partnership with Captain John Paty and Henry D. Fitch. He served as an agent for both Thomas O. Larkin and his half brother, Captain John B.R. Cooper. McKinley married Carmen Amesti, daughter of José Amesti, who was the grantee of Rancho Los Corralitos. McKinley was also the patentee of Rancho Moro y Cayucos.

With the cession of California to the United States following the Mexican-American War, the 1848 Treaty of Guadalupe Hidalgo provided that the land grants would be honored. As required by the Land Act of 1851, a claim for Rancho San Lucas was filed with the Public Land Commission in 1853, and the grant was patented to James McKinley in 1882.

McKinley sold Rancho San Lucas in 1862 to Alberto Trescony (1814-1892), during a drought that devastated California cattle ranches. Trescony, born in Italy, arrived in Monterey in 1842. A tinsmith, he became wealthy enough manufacturing pans for California Gold Rush miners to begin investing in real estate.

With the purchase of part of Rancho San Bernardo and all of Rancho San Benito, Trescony consolidated his San Lucas holdings into a ranch of about 20,000 acres (81 km^{2}). He also acquired Rancho Tularcitos. Drought in 1871–1872 killed large numbers of Trescony's sheep. In 1876, he moved to Santa Cruz, and turned over the operation of the rancho to his son, Julius A. Trescony.

At some point in the 1880s, Alberto Trescony moved back to Monterey County. He died in 1892 during a stay at a Salinas hotel. The estate was distributed to his three children: a one-third interest to his son; a one-third interest to his daughter, the wife of Robert F. Johnson of El Paso, Texas; and a one-third interest to the two minor children (Anita Christal and her brother Leo Christal) of his deceased daughter, Rose, wife of J.F. Christal. It remains owned by the Trescony family.

== See also ==
- Ranchos of California
- List of Ranchos of California
