= Cayucos Elementary School District =

School district in California, United States

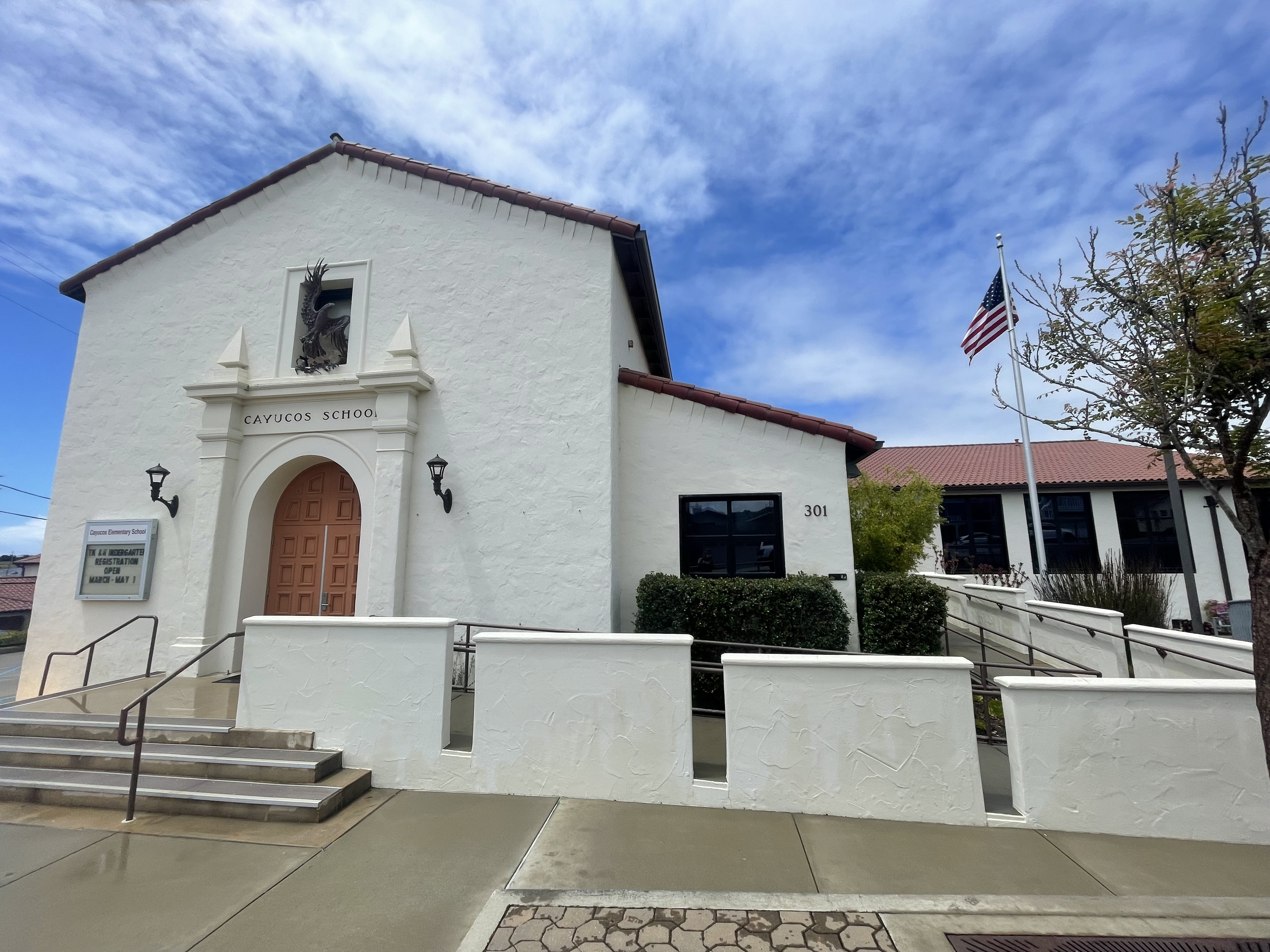

Address
- 301 Cayucos Drive Cayucos, California, 93430; United States

District information
- Type: Public
- Grades: K–8
- NCES District ID: 0607840

Students and staff
- Students: 162 (2020–2021)
- Teachers: 13.31 (FTE)
- Staff: 13.91 (FTE)
- Student–teacher ratio: 12.17:1

Other information
- Website: sites.google.com/a/cayucosschool.org/cayucos-elementary-school-district/

Cayucos Elementary School District (CESD) is a public school district based in San Luis Obispo County, California. CESD was founded in 1881 and is a unified school district for the town of Cayucos in the U.S. state of California.

As of 2026, the district serves grades TK-8, with yearly enrollment averaging 170 to 200 students.

In 2025, Cayucos Elementary School District was ranked the top elementary and middle school in SLO County by Niche, which examined reviews from students and parents, state test scores, teacher quality, student-teacher ratio, student diversity, and overall school district quality. Niche also ranked CESD among the top 2% of K-8 public schools in America, placing it at #135 out of 6,588 schools in 2025.

== History ==
=== Relevant town history ===
The history of California and the town of Cayucos is relevant to the creation and expansion of Cayucos Elementary School District because it demonstrates how rooted in the community the school is.

The California Gold Rush brought approximately 300,000 gold seekers from outside the state and country from 1848 to 1855. Only a few hundred out of hundreds of thousands would make a significant fortune from mining for gold. Instead, cattle drives proved to be a more reliable way to earn money. The growing population of mining communities created a higher demand for meat, which rancheros from California and cattlemen from Texas, the Middle West, and Mexico sought to fill. Herds of animals ranging from seven hundred to a thousand were brought to mining districts and sold for up to five hundred dollars a head at the height of the Gold Rush in 1849.

In comparison, cattle prices were about four dollars a head before the Gold Rush. The Gold Rush profoundly impacted the California economy, not just through gold but also through other industries such as agriculture. However, the trade of hides and cattle was stunted by a series of extreme weather events in the state. A severe drought in 1856 caused heavy cattle losses, which, in conjunction with out-of-state breeders' competition driving down California cattle prices and property taxes, led many rancheros to lose their herds and land. Heavy rainfall in 1862 caused widespread flooding. Farms in the Central Valley of the state went underwater as a runoff lake covered thousands of acres of land, and about 200,000 cattle drowned or starved statewide. Losses in cattle were exacerbated by the Great Drought of 1862-1864. An estimated 300,000 cattle died from starvation, dehydration, suffocation due to dust inhalation, and some were even intentionally slaughtered to attempt to save a few animals for future commerce or for sustenance. This event was the final nail in the coffin for rancheros, and small dairy farms rose in the place of large herds of cattle.

Dairy farms were introduced in California in the mid- to late 19th century and quickly spread across the state. Dairy became such a major industry that towns like Cayucos were created to meet this demand and expand trade. The first recorded commercial dairy in California was established in Marin County in the 1850s. Still, they would soon proliferate throughout the state to meet the demand for dairy products such as fresh milk, cheese, and butter in growing urban populations, such as Los Angeles and San Francisco, in the late 1800s. According to the U.S. Census agricultural surveys, there were 210,000 dairy cows in California in 1860, 307,000 in 1900, and 382,000 by 1910. These numbers demonstrate growth in the dairy industry, mainly driven by dairies in the Central Valley, which consistently had the most dairy cows, followed by the Lower and Northern Coastal regions. “Sonoma, Humboldt, Alameda, San Luis Obispo, and Los Angeles counties contested with the central valley counties of Sacramento, San Joaquin, Stanislaus, Fresno, and Tulare for having the most dairy stock." In San Luis Obispo County, the town of Cayucos was established as a commercial seaport and shipping hub for the county’s dairy industry.

The first settlement in the Cayucos area was the community of Old Creek, founded by John Bains in 1855 between San Luis Obispo and San Simeon, two larger towns. At the time, the settlement served as a stage stop, a relay point along a mail or passenger coach route. The settlement served the needs of ranchers and travelers with a general merchandise store, dining establishment, saloon, and overnight accommodations. In 1867, James Cass moved to the area and recognized its potential as a shipping port. Cass partnered with Captain J.M. Ingalls, who used the landing to transport lumber and manufactured goods to the area. The sea lanes were an efficient way to ship dairy products, produce, and livestock from Cayucos and San Luis Obispo County due to the Central Coast's mountainous terrain. Cass built a 380-foot wharf in 1873, which he upgraded to a 940-foot pier in 1875, allowing ships to dock. He also constructed a large warehouse known as Cayucos Landing, which stored local farm goods, specifically butter and cheese for the region’s dairies, that were to be sent out on ships later. These additions sparked the town’s growth as they allowed Cayucos to become a midway point for vessels traveling between San Francesco and Los Angeles, as well as increase the town's output as “coastal steamers docked regularly to transport dairy products to large population centers in northern and southern California." Previously, Cayucos served as a mere stop on a traveler’s journey. However, thanks to Cass’s contributions, Cayucos grew into a town with a community and the central structures to support it.

In September 1875, Cayucos officially became a town, recorded on California's subdivision map, with James Cass being attributed to its founding and success. In addition to constructing the pier and warehouse, Cass also added a mercantile store and established key public amenities, including a post office. Soon after its establishment, Cayucos began to grow as lots were purchased by individuals such as Bastia Morganti, who constructed the Cosmopolitan Hotel in 1875, and others, who created the town’s business district. By 1886, Cayucos had “4 hotels, 4 merchandise stores, 2 blacksmiths, 3 saloons, 2 butchers, several stables, and various other businesses.” With Cayucos’s growth as a town came the need for a school.

=== Founding ===
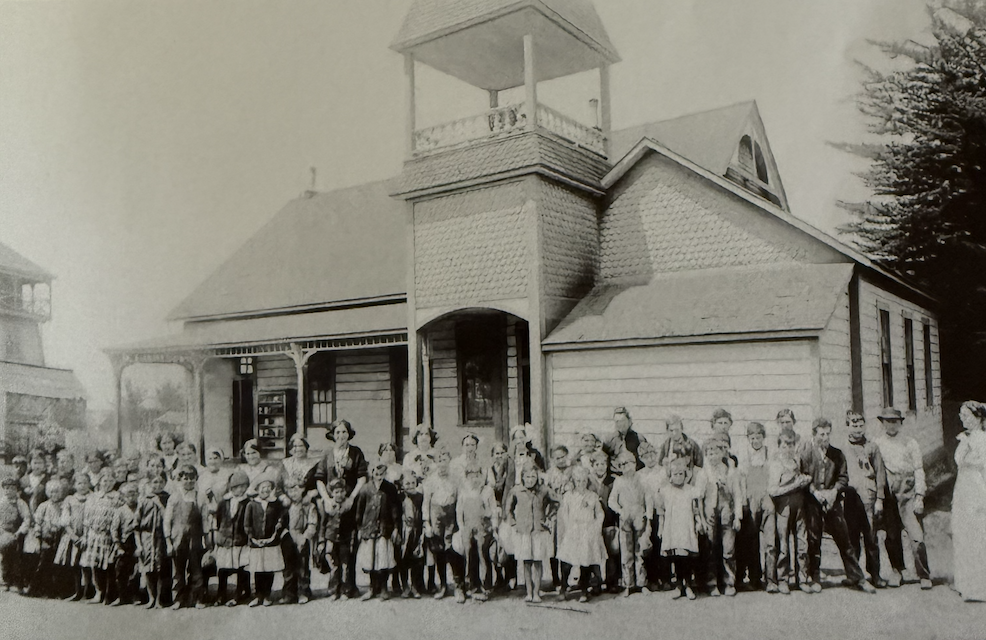
The second Cayucos schoolhouse that was constructed in 1890.

The state’s first Constitution, adopted in 1849, set aside land to fund education and established the superintendent of public instruction. In 1867, California schools became free for all children. Compulsory attendance was enacted for children ages 8 to 15, and the state began providing aid to a district based on the number of children enrolled in 1874. These aspects of the California school system were in place when the Cayucos School District was established in 1881, with the original schoolhouse located on E Street. At this point, there were about 3,446 public elementary and high schools in California.

James Cass was also involved in the formation of the Cayucos school district. He was a member of the first school board and helped build the first schoolhouse. To accommodate the growing population of Cayucos and the student population, in 1890, the town built a second school near the first. The school had three rooms: one dedicated to instruction for students in grades 1 through 4, the other for students in grades 5 through 8, and a library. Neither of these schools taught past the eighth grade. Students had to leave the town for high school. From 1880 to 1963, Cayucos was cut off from the neighboring town of Morro Bay, whose school district offered high school instruction because Toro Creek resembled a river at the time. Toro Creek served as a deterrent to everyday travel, so Cayucos’ children instead attended high school in Cambria. Cambria’s first high school class was formed by ranching families in the area and “at least one Cayucos student” in 1891. Classes at Cambria, like most schools in San Luis Obispo County in 1905, were held in a single room.

=== 20th-century ===
The current Cayucos Elementary School building was constructed in 1936 to accommodate a growing community. The people of Cayucos debated the school's location, with many arguing that it should be closer to the heart of town but eventually settled on the site it occupies today at 301 Cayucos Dr, Cayucos, CA 93430. The site of the current school was deeded to the district, and additional lots were purchased from the Minetti and Pedrotta Families for $1200. The former of the two was in the cattle business while the latter were blacksmiths in Cayucos. An April 1952 PTA meeting discussed the need for additional classrooms with the school board to meet the demands of their growing community. The PTA members voted in favor of a bond issue. In May 1952, the trustees voted to submit a $75,000 bond issue to the electors and to call a special election for July 1 of that year. If approved, the money would go toward the acquisition of additional land to construct a cafeteria building and a two-classroom building. On July 2, 1952, the votes were counted with 113 tallied in favor and 23 against.

=== Present day ===
Since 1936, Cayucos Elementary School has modernized its facilities. Now the school has a multipurpose building that serves as a gymnasium for competitive sports events and physical education classes, an assembly room, a stage for theatrical productions, and houses four classrooms and a cafeteria. The school added a kindergarten playground, a hard-top play yard, an interior courtyard space, renovated the existing 1936 administration building, converted relocatable classrooms into permanent buildings, and added a community library. In September of 2025, the school unveiled a new play structure, funded by various community organizations and gifts from families and individuals in the town of Cayucos.

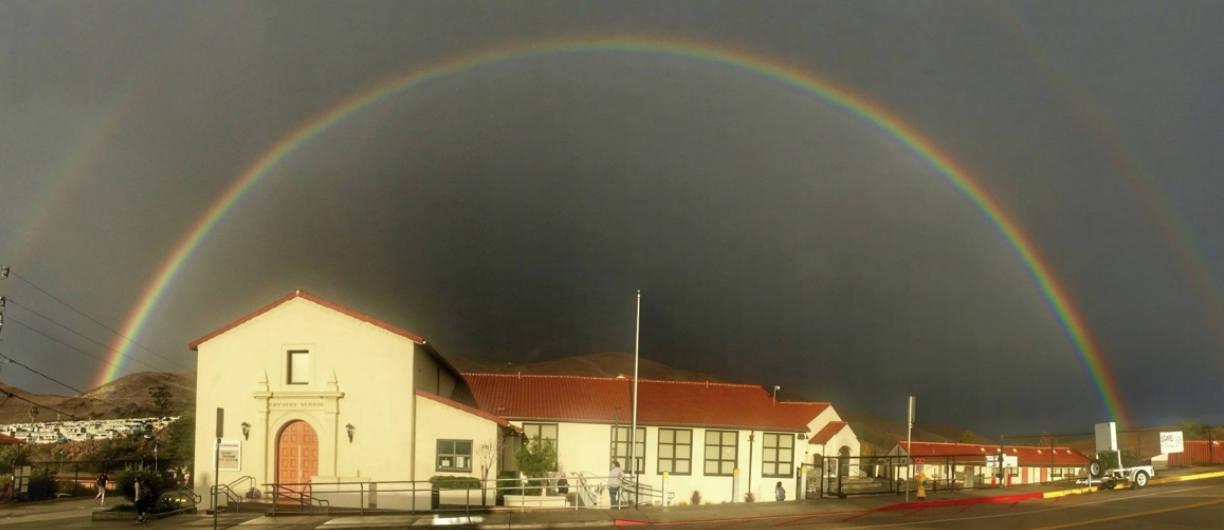
Taken from across the street so that most of the school district is in view with the rainbow.

The history of Cayucos as a town and its school district demonstrates how successes in this area were deeply rooted in the community. Though the wharf and warehouse might have initially been built for his own gain, these key structures, built by James Cass, converted the settlement from a stage stop to a town with a thriving dairy industry. Cass also contributed to the school’s establishment. Cass exhibits how individuals can allocate their resources to help the overall prosperity of a town or school. Carrying on this tradition of local support, the modern-day renovations of Cayucos Elementary School were funded by families and groups in the local area. Despite the small size of Cayucos’ population, support for the school comes from within the community. In addition to funding improvements to school facilities, the residents of Cayucos directly finance the Cayucos Elementary School District, rather than relying on federal funding.

== Funding ==
=== Basic aid funding ===
Cayucos Elementary School District is a “basic aid”, otherwise known as community-funded or “excess taxes,” district. This term describes a model in which a school district's property tax revenue exceeds the amount of funding the state would provide under the Local Control Funding Formula (LCFF). Thus, the school district keeps its local property taxes and consequently receives less funding from the state and federal governments. Cayucos is one of about 140 basic aid districts of California’s 1,000 school districts. Basic aid districts serve 5.5% of California’s TK-12 students.

Public schools were locally funded, mostly through property taxes, with only some aid from the state and local governments for most of California’s history. This system perpetuated inequality. Differences in property wealth led to less money being spent on public education in lower-income areas than in wealthy ones. In 1971, the California Supreme Court found it unconstitutional in Serrano v. Priest. The state legislature proposed a new system that would limit the amount of per-pupil revenue each district could receive in response to the court’s demand to equalize funding across districts. Proposition 13 was adopted by California voters in 1978 and capped local property tax rates at 1% and allowed a maximum increase of 2% per year. This policy reduced funding available to local public schools and shifted the burden of school funding to the state government rather than to the local community. Proposition 98 established the idea of “revenue limits” in 1988, which refers to the “base amount of per pupil funding needed for school operations” based on the district’s historical spending levels. Revenue limit funding is the general-purpose funding for basic school operations and consists of property taxes and state aid. For most California districts, property tax revenue alone is not enough to meet the revenue limit, so the state supplements the shortfall so the district can achieve the necessary per-pupil funding. In contrast, “basic aid” or “excess tax” districts collect more property tax revenue than their revenue limit allows. They acquire enough revenue from property taxes that they do not need state funding and even have an extra amount to allocate to each student in their district.

In 2013, California enacted the LCFF, which provides additional funding to districts serving students who might need more resources to succeed, including English learners, low-income students, and foster youth. Populations of basic aid districts tend to be “more educated… have fewer disadvantaged students, and higher total funding levels than revenue limit districts,” so they tend to have fewer vulnerable students that qualify them for extra aid under the LCFF. Basic aid districts do not receive state aid to fund their LCFF calculation because the surplus money they gain through local property tax revenues exceeds the district’s LCFF entitlement.

The funding of basic aid districts is closely tied to the outcome of the real estate market because of its dependency on local property taxes. Thus, year-over-year fluctuations in property values can impact funding. Basic aid districts are required to maintain a reserve, so if property values drop in a particular year, they have the funds to respond to unforeseen financial circumstances.

=== Cayucos’ data ===
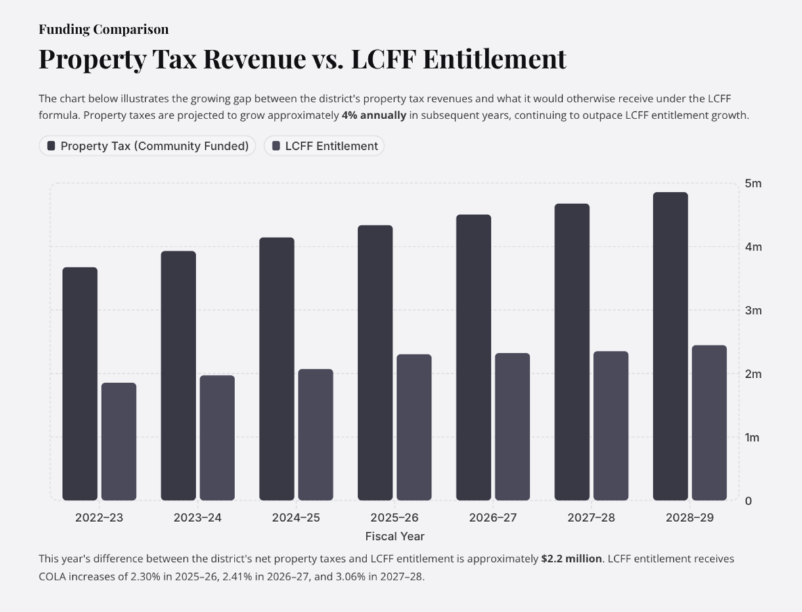
A graph which demonstrates the yearly and then projected property tax revenue of Cayucos Elementary School District in comparison to the yearly and projected LCFF Entitlement.

In the 2025-2026 school year, Cayucos received about $4.4 million in property tax revenue for their revenue limit funding, $89,000 in federal revenue, $541,000 in state revenue, $476,000 in local revenue, and $60,000 from other sources. In total, the Cayucos Elementary School District accumulated about $5.6 million. This year, Cayucos’s net property taxes exceed its revenue limit/the amount they would have received from the LCFF calculation by $2.2 million.

In the 2024-25 school year, the Cayucos Elementary School District spent an average of $28,627 per student. In comparison, the statewide average of elementary school districts was $20,227, and the average for all districts in California was $21,214 for that same year. The national public school spending per pupil in 2024 was $17,619.

As a basic-aid school district, Cayucos has access to more funds and thus more resources per student. In 2024, Cayucos spent about $7,000 more per pupil than the average district in California. Due to this surplus of funding, Cayucos Elementary School District can allocate more resources to its students. These funding advantages are expected to increase over time for the district, as a financial report presented to the Cayucos Board of Trustees stated that property taxes are projected to grow approximately 4% in subsequent years. Cayucos has and will continue to outpace the LCFF entitlement/revenue limit for their school.

== Enrollment ==
The Cayucos Elementary School District is a unified, single-school district that spans the coastal community of Cayucos. All residential addresses located within the town limits feed into Cayucos’s Elementary and Middle Schools, serving students in grades TK-8. About 200 students attended Cayucos in the 2025-2026 school year. The school district usually averages around 170 to 200 students per year.

After graduating 8th grade, students within the Cayucos district lines primarily feed into the San Luis Coastal Unified School District. However, many families opt instead to attend Morro Bay High School. Since 2018, parents can request an inter-district transfer from Cayucos Elementary School to choose the high school their children attend. Now, most families join the San Luis Coastal Unified School District and thus Morro Bay High School rather than the Coast Unified School District and Coast Union High School. The former is only about five miles from Cayucos and has a student population of 750 to 800, while the latter is about fifteen miles away and has about 150 to 160 students.

== Demographics ==
=== Town ===
As of the 2020 census, Cayucos had a population of 2,505. Examining the demographics of the town of Cayucos is relevant to the school district because it is a basic aid district that relies on the property taxes of its community. Basic aid districts tend to be concentrated along the northern coast and eastern border of the state. Cayucos is part of the 30% of basic aid districts located on the coast south of the Bay Area.

The average age in Cayucos is 59.4. About 35% of the population is 65 and over, 56% is between the ages of 18 and 64, and 9% is under the age of 18.

For race and ethnicity, 83% of Cayucos’ population is white, more than double the California rate (34%) and 1.3 times the San Luis Obispo-Paso Robles area rate (65%). About 10% of the population in Cayucos is Hispanic, and less than 2% is Asian. 4.9% of the population is foreign-born. 69% of this statistic is from Latin America, 15% from Asia, and 16% from Europe.

The per-capita income in Cayucos is about $57,000. This statistic is about 10% higher than the amount in the San Luis Obispo-Paso Robles area and about 20% higher than California's per capita income. The median household income is approximately $87,000. Only about 9.3% of persons are below the poverty line, with only 3% of seniors (ages 65 and over) and 20% of children under 18 in poverty.

The median value of owner-occupied housing units is approximately $1 million. 42% of owner-occupied housing units have a value between $500,000 and $1 million, and 22% have a value over $1 million.

Understanding the demographics of the town of Cayucos is important both because residents fund the school through their property taxes and because student characteristics tend to match those of adults and households. There is a strong tie between socioeconomic status and test scores. Cayucos doesn’t have a large low-income, English learner, or unhoused population, so the school doesn’t have many students facing those challenges.

=== School district ===
Cayucos follows the overall trend: most basic-aid districts (about 60%) are elementary districts that enroll only grades TK-8. In addition, basic aid districts, such as Cayucos’ average of about 170 to 200 students, tend to have smaller student populations than revenue limit districts (those that require state funding to meet their revenue limit).

In the 2025-26 school year 62.9% of students at Cayucos Elementary School District were white, 24.9% were Hispanic or Latino, 4.9% were two or more races, 0.5% were African American, and 0.5% were Filipino.

53 unduplicated students qualified as low-income, English learners, or foster youth. This number amounts to about 25% of the student population. In 2024-25, 43 students in the district were eligible for free and reduced-price meals.

Most students from the Cayucos Elementary School District meet or exceed standards on the state test, the California Assessment of Student Performance and Progress (CAASPP). In the 2023-204 school year, 47% and 35.6% of students statewide met or exceed standards in English Language/Art or Mathematics, respectively. For Cayucos, 68.30% of students met or exceeded standards in ELA and 55.65% met or exceeded standards in Math on the CAASP.
