= Harmony, California =

Unincorporated community in California, United States

Harmony
- Unincorporated community
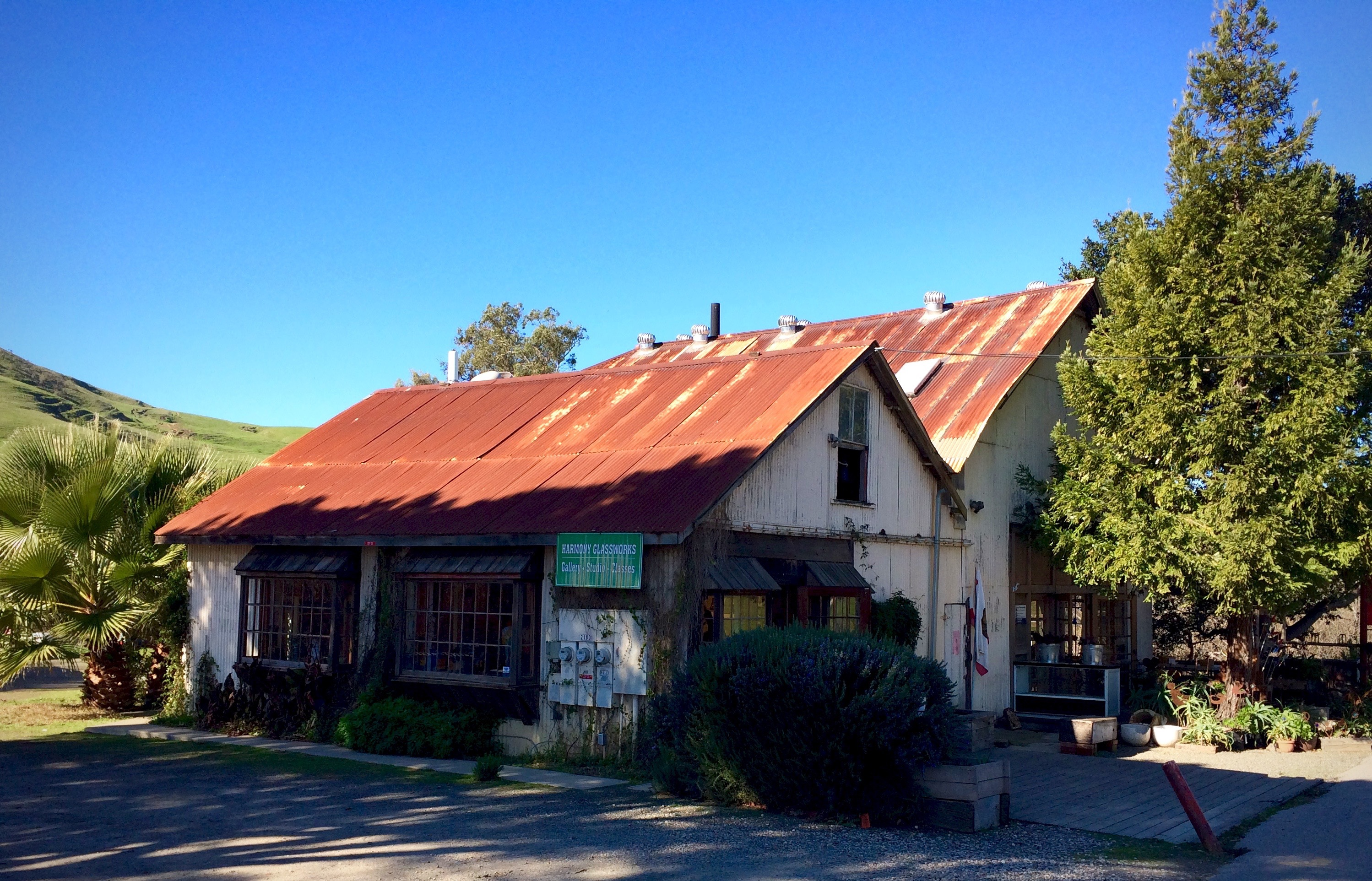
- Harmony Glassworks, part of the old Harmony Creamery plant, 2016

- Location in California Location in the United States
- Coordinates: 35°30′31″N 121°01′22″W
- Country: United States
- State: California
- County: San Luis Obispo

Population (2000)
  - Total: 18
- Time zone: UTC-08:00 (PDT)
  - Summer (DST): UTC-07:00 (PDT)
- ZIP Codes: 93435
- Area code: 805

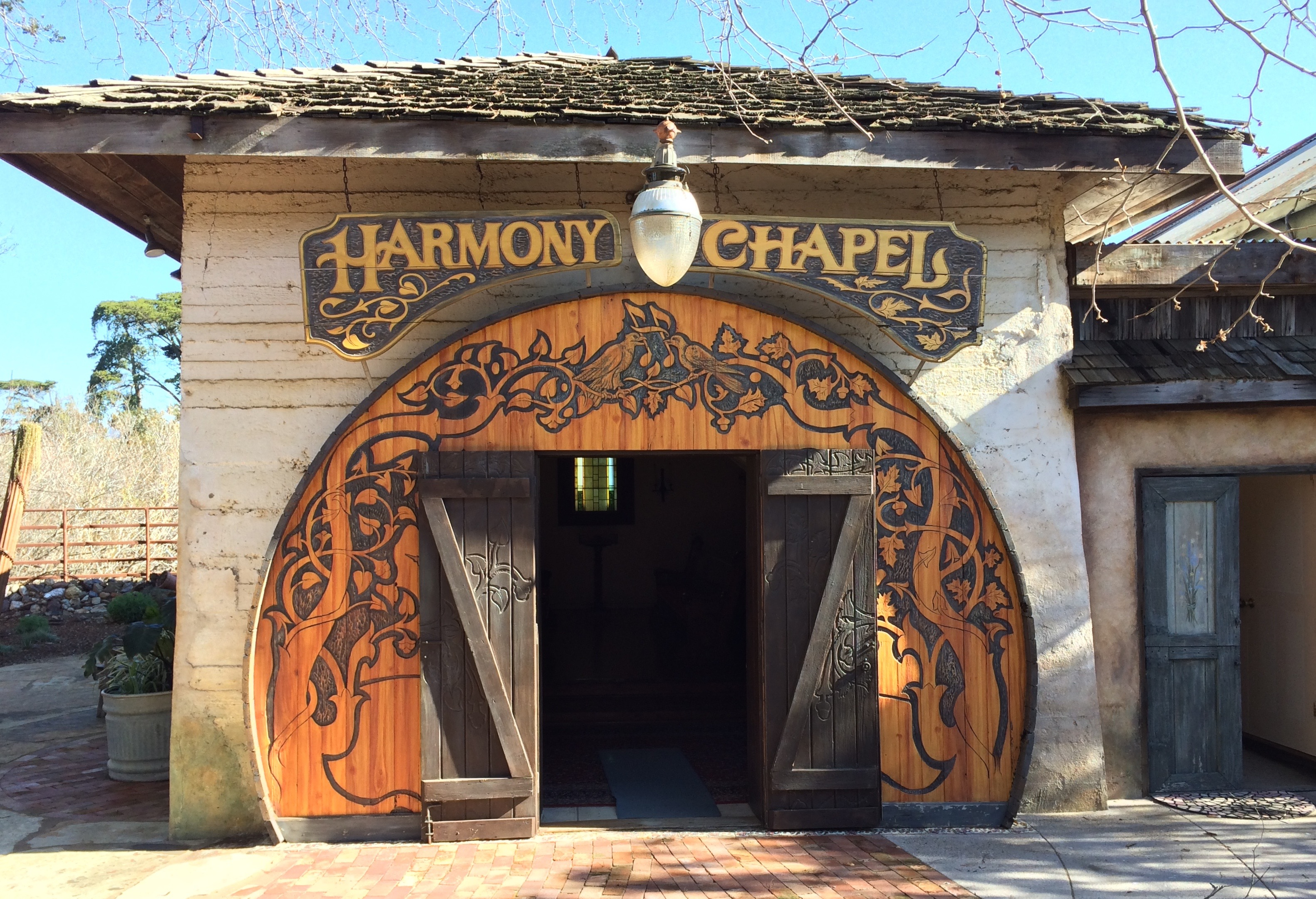
Harmony wedding chapel

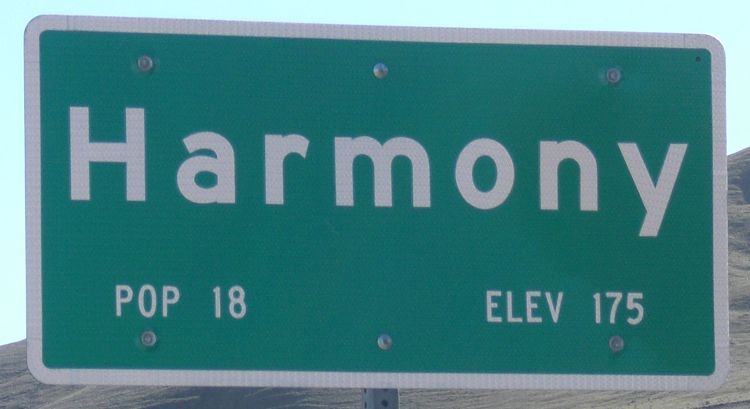
Town sign for Harmony, California on SR 1

Harmony is an unincorporated community located in San Luis Obispo County, California. It lies north of Cayucos and south of Cambria on SR 1, near the junction with SR 46.

== History ==
The town of Harmony began as a dairy settlement in the late 19th century started by Swiss immigrants living near the Italian border.

Harmony was founded in 1869 around several dairy ranches and a creamery. The operation changed hands repeatedly because of rivalries that led to a killing. In 1907, owners and ranchers agreed to call off their feud and called the town by its present name as a symbol of their truce.

The Harmony Valley Dairy Co-op was founded in 1901. As the town grew, it soon hosted a dairy management office, dormitories for employees, a livery stable, a blacksmith, and later a gas station. A school was built, and a feed store and post office gave Harmony official status as a community. At its peak, the creamery employed 10 workers, producing high quality dairy products, including butter and cheese that gave Harmony name recognition statewide. Tourists traveling Hwy 1 often stopped for fresh buttermilk, and famed publishing magnate William Randolph Hearst stopped often in Harmony on his way to his opulent home in San Simeon, 12 miles northwest, as did many of the Hollywood celebrities who were frequent guests of Hearst.

Increased grazing land fees and dairy industry consolidation led to the closure of Harmony's creamery around 1955. The town lost population until the 1970s when it was rediscovered by California's young counter-culture population, many of whom were looking for a rural lifestyle where they could practice traditional crafts away from the pressures and technology of urban life. Many of the town's historic landmarks, including the main creamery, were restored and reopened as restaurants and shops.

In 1979 Harmony was featured by KABC in Los Angeles with a live broadcast of the Ken and Bob Company radio show. Ken Minyard and Bob Arthur were the hosts and featured artist Jehry Miller singing his hit song "Harmonizing in Harmony Population 18". Jehry Miller, along with producer Stephen G. Scott of Los Angeles, also wrote the Ken and Bob Company theme song.

Since the 1970s, Harmony has experienced cycles of prosperity and neglect. It has been home to upscale restaurants, crafts, ceramics and art. More recently, Harmony became a town in name only; a single restaurant remained, but went through several owners before closing in the late 1990s. A small cadre of artisans keeps Harmony alive, with retail shops selling art objects, locally hand blown glass, and pottery, but the town faces an uncertain future. Harmony was recently put up for sale. Helping keep the town alive is Harmony Cellars, a boutique winery and tasting room, about 1/4 mile south. The winery opened in 1989 and in 2006 produced about 6,000 cases of Central Coast varietals such as Chardonnay and Cabernet Sauvignon.

Harmony Headlands State Park contains the native Indian thistle (Circium brevistylum), which looks similar to the invasive bull thistle (Circium vulgare). Conyza canadensis is another native that looks similar to a weed in the same genus.

In 2014, Harmony was purchased by Alan VanderHorst and his family, who plan to restore and preserve the 2.5-acre historic town.

== Layout ==
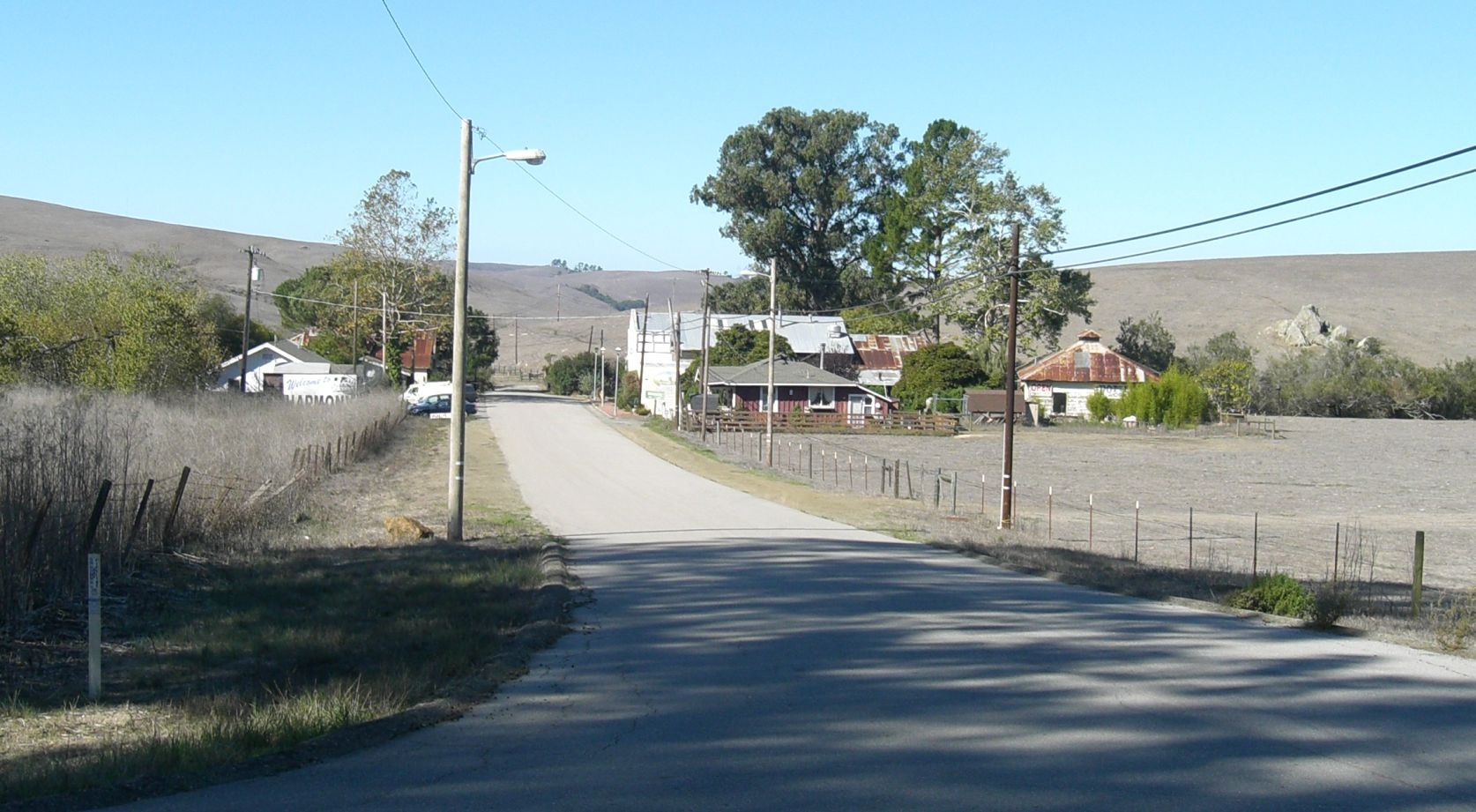
The town of Harmony, California, November 2007

Harmony is one paved street off of SR 1. The main structure is a U-shaped building, the former creamery, with the open area being a small plaza. On the far side of the structure is the Harmony Pottery Shop. On the near side is the former post office and a lounge for visitors.

There was a restaurant, but it closed in 1997. The post office was in operation until April 11, 2008. There is a wedding chapel in the rear, and gardens nearby.

Harmony Glassworks now lies at the north-west end of the street. Founded in 2007 and open daily, the shop is a gallery, studio and school, which offers beginner classes in glassblowing techniques.

The former Harmony Valley Creamery, a dairy cooperative that closed in 1955, is located here.

== Geography ==
=== Climate ===
Harmony has a mild, maritime-influenced Mediterranean climate with rainy winters, dry summers, and little seasonal temperature variation.

Climate data for Harmony, California
Month	Jan	Feb	Mar	Apr	May	Jun	Jul	Aug	Sep	Oct	Nov	Dec	Year
Mean daily maximum °F (°C)	64.3 (17.9)	64.6 (18.1)	66.3 (19.1)	65.2 (18.4)	65.8 (18.8)	66.5 (19.2)	68.7 (20.4)	69.7 (20.9)	69.6 (20.9)	70.1 (21.2)	69.4 (20.8)	64.0 (17.8)	67.0 (19.4)
Daily mean °F (°C)	53.0 (11.7)	53.9 (12.2)	55.0 (12.8)	54.8 (12.7)	56.7 (13.7)	58.5 (14.7)	60.9 (16.1)	61.4 (16.3)	61.0 (16.1)	59.7 (15.4)	57.1 (13.9)	52.8 (11.6)	57.1 (13.9)
Mean daily minimum °F (°C)	41.8 (5.4)	43.1 (6.2)	43.6 (6.4)	44.4 (6.9)	47.5 (8.6)	50.4 (10.2)	53.0 (11.7)	53.1 (11.7)	52.4 (11.3)	49.2 (9.6)	44.9 (7.2)	41.6 (5.3)	47.1 (8.4)
Average precipitation inches (mm)	3.72 (94)	4.10 (104)	3.50 (89)	1.20 (30)	0.40 (10)	0.08 (2.0)	0.01 (0.25)	0.03 (0.76)	0.21 (5.3)	0.88 (22)	1.63 (41)	3.04 (77)	18.81 (478)
Source: PRISM Climate Group

== Featured in media ==
In episode 3 of the Korean drama The Heirs produced by Seoul Broadcasting System, the main characters played by Lee Min-ho and Park Shin-hye visit the town of Harmony and the winery located there.

In the 4th episode of the HLN Kids Network's Gerbda, Harmony is mentioned on a list of tourist destinations read by Buster, a character played by Matt Walsh.

Harmony is featured as an artists' colony in the Perry Mason episode "The Case of the Absent Artist" (season 5, episode 23; 1962), under the name "Port Harmony".
