= Whale Rock Reservoir =

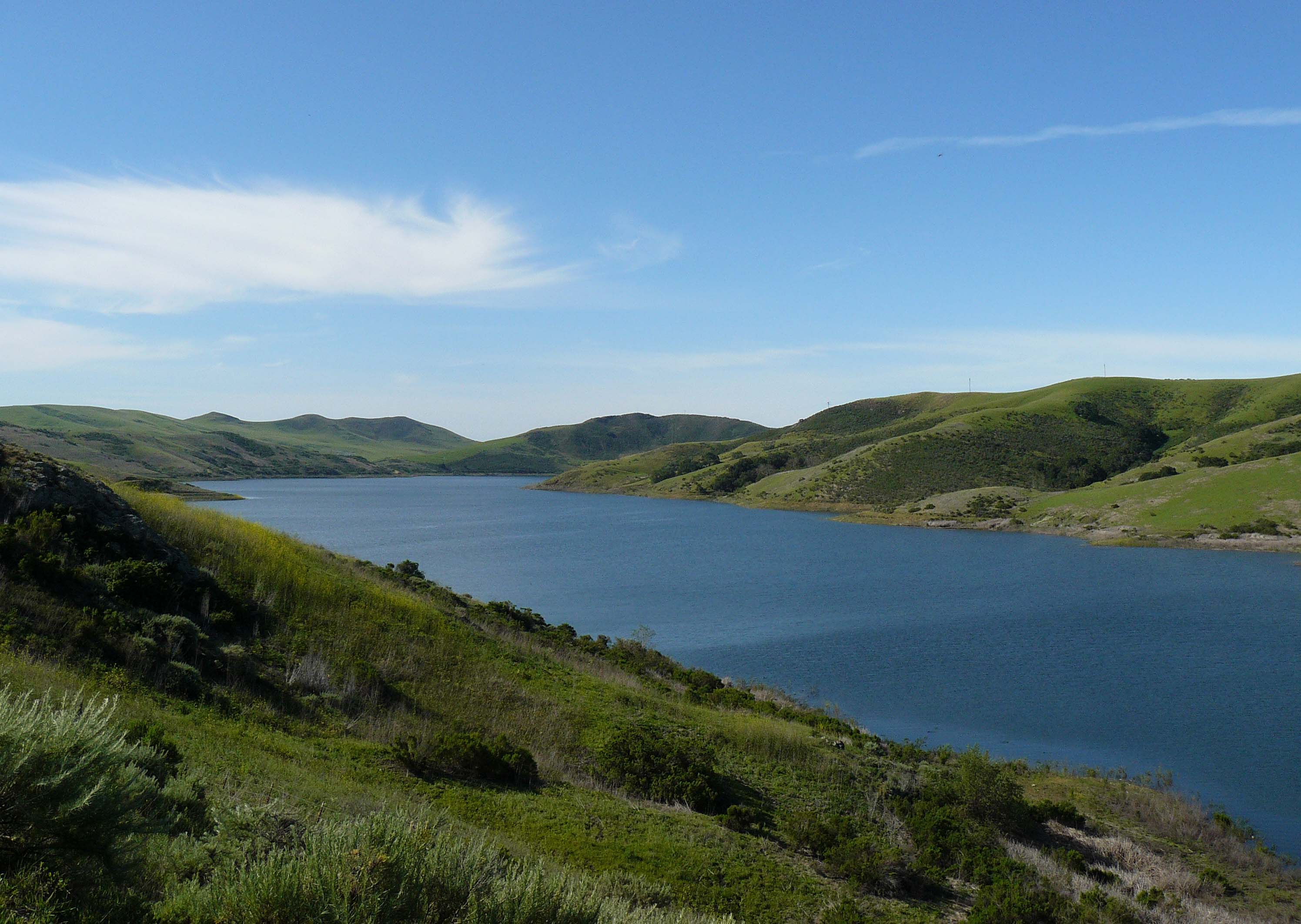

- Location within California Location within the United States
- Location: San Luis Obispo County, California
- Coordinates: 35°27′30″N 120°52′20″W
- Type: Reservoir
- Catchment area: 20.6 mi^{2} (53 km^{2})
- Basin countries: United States
- Surface elevation: 150 feet (50 m)

Whale Rock Reservoir is a reservoir near Cayucos in San Luis Obispo County, California.

The reservoir was formed by the building of Whale Rock Dam on Old Creek by the Whale Rock Commission. It is a 193-foot (59 m) tall earthfill dam that was completed in 1961 (65 years ago). The reservoir has a capacity of 40,662 acre⋅ft (50.156 million m^{3}). The watershed has an area of 20.6 square miles (53 km^{2}). It provides drinking water for the city of San Luis Obispo, the California Men's Colony, Cal Poly, and the Cayucos Area Water Organization. The water is brought to San Luis Obispo by the 17.6 miles (28.3 km) long, 30-inch (760 mm) diameter Whale Rock Conduit.

== See also ==
- List of lakes in California
