= Wilkes University Election Statistics Project =

Website documenting elections in Pennsylvania, United States

- Website type: Election data
- Available in: English
- Owner: Wilkes University
- Creator: Harold Cox
- Website: Wilkes Education
- Registration: No
- Launched: 1996
- Current status: active

The Wilkes University Election Statistics Project is a free online resource documenting Pennsylvania political election results dating back to 1796.

== History ==
Currently, the database documents Pennsylvania's county-level vote totals for President, Governor, United States Senator, and Congressional elections back to 1796. The database also contains directories for members of the Pennsylvania Provincial Assembly and the Pennsylvania General Assembly, dating back to 1682.

According to the database's designer, Wilkes University Professor Harold E. Cox, "No other state has anything like it." The project's impetus began in 1996, when Cox inquired about 19th century election statistics, only to find that the data would cost $1,000.

The project has been cataloged by the Pennsylvania State University Libraries and the Van Pelt Library at the University of Pennsylvania. It has been cited as a source in academic books about the Supreme Court of the United States, Communist politicians in Pennsylvania, and a survey of state-level political parties.

== See also ==
- Elections in Pennsylvania
