= Rancho Moro y Cayucos =

Land grant in California

Coordinates: 35.430°N 120.850°W

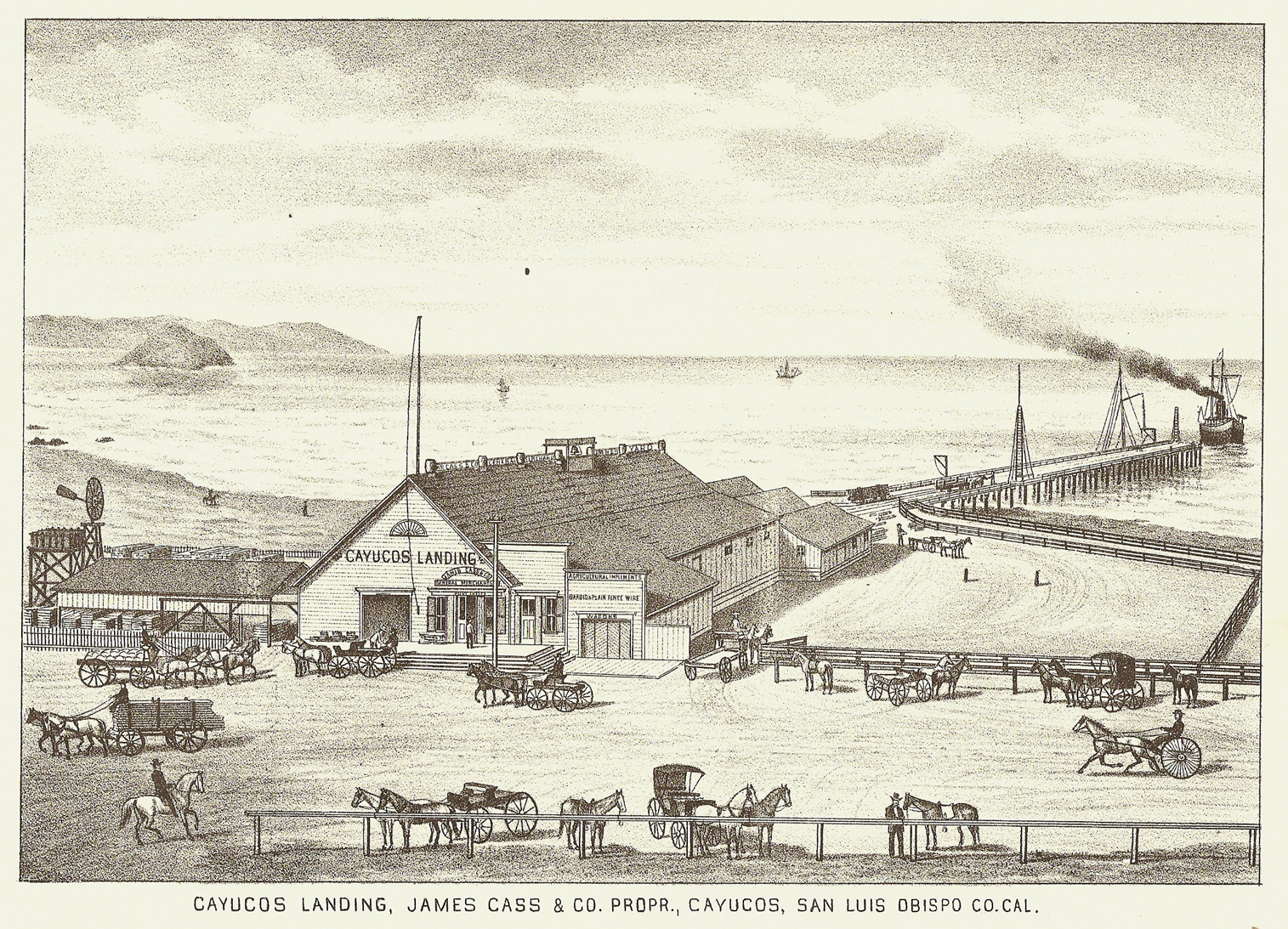
Cayucos Landing in 1883

Rancho Moro y Cayucos was a 8,045-acre (32.56 km^{2}) Mexican land grant in present-day San Luis Obispo County, California given in 1842 by Governor Juan B. Alvarado to Martin Olivera and Vicente Feliz (Felis). The grant extended along the Pacific Coast from just north of present-day Cayucos south to Moro Creek just north of present-day Morro Bay.

== History ==
Leonardo Martín Olivera (1782-), son of Juan Maria Olivera (1753-) and Maria Guadalupe Briones (1764-1848), was a soldier of the Monterey Company assigned to Mission Soledad. His daughter, Maria Augustina Olivera (1819-1896) married Vincente Antonio Feliz (1805-1850), son of Jose Doroteo Feliz and Juana Josefa Villalobo. Vicente Feliz and Augustina Olivera married 31 July 1839 at Mission San Luis Obispo de Tolusa. Martin Olivera and his son-in-law Vincente Felix were granted two square leagues (Olivera the Moro half and Felix the Cayucos half) in 1842.

In 1845, they sold Rancho Morro y Cayucos to James McKinley, a Scottish sailor, who had married Carmen Amesti, daughter of José Amesti, who was the grantee of Rancho Los Corralitos. McKinley was also the patentee of Rancho San Lucas.

With the cession of California to the United States following the Mexican-American War, the 1848 Treaty of Guadalupe Hidalgo provided that the land grants would be honored. As required by the Land Act of 1851, a claim for Rancho Moro y Cayucos was filed with the Public Land Commission in 1853, and the grant was patented to James McKinley in 1878.

By 1867, McKinley had begun selling the rancho in smaller tracts. George Hearst bought several lots in 1867. Both Captain James Cass and Angus Hardie arrived in 1867, and each acquired 320 acres (1.3 km^{2}). In 1872, Domingo Pujol, a San Francisco attorney, acquired part of the rancho through a mortgage foreclosure. Pujol sold his part to real estate developer Chauncey Hatch Phillips in 1875.

== See also ==
- Ranchos of California
- List of Ranchos of California
