= Henry Cox =

American politician (1832-?)

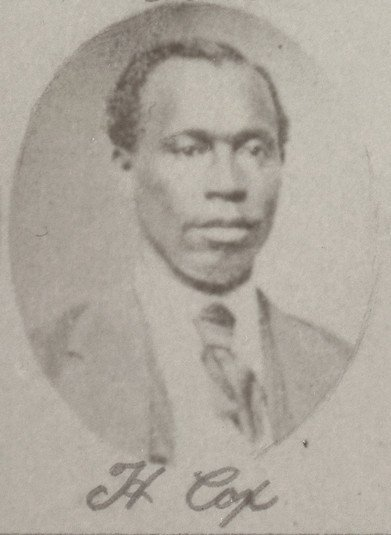
Photographic portrait of Henry Cox, from the 1871–1872 Virginia General Assembly montage

Henry Cox (December 1832 - ?) was an American shoemaker and politician, who served as a state legislator in Virginia. He served several terms in the Virginia House of Delegates. He represented Dinwiddie County. He married and had two daughters.

He was born in Powhatan County. He and his family moved to Washington D.C. about 1881.
