= Rancho San Bernardo (Soberanes) =

Mexican land grant in California

Coordinates: 36.050°N 120.940°W

Rancho San Bernardo was a 13,346-acre (54.01 km^{2}) Mexican land grant in present-day Monterey County, California given in 1841 by Governor Juan Alvarado to Mariano de Jesus Soberanes and Juan Soberanes. The grant extended along the west bank of the Salinas River. The grant encompassed present-day San Ardo.

== History ==
The Soberanes family patriarch, José Maria Soberanes (1753-1803) accompanied the Portola expedition to San Francisco Bay in 1769. Soberanes married Maria Josefa Castro (1759-1822) and received Rancho Buena Vista. His sons Feliciano Soberanes (1788-1868) and Mariano Soberanes (1794-1859) were granted Rancho El Alisal in 1833.

Mariano de Jesus Soberanes was a soldier and also held the office of Alcalde of Monterey. Mariano Soberanes married María Isidora Vallejo (1791-1830) sister of General Mariano Guadalupe Vallejo. Their daughter, Maria Ygnacia Soberanes, married Dr. Edward Turner Bale grantee of Rancho Carne Humana. Mariano de Jesus Soberanes was granted the three square league Rancho San Bernardo in 1842.

With the cession of California to the United States following the Mexican-American War, the 1848 Treaty of Guadalupe Hidalgo provided that the land grants would be honored. As required by the Land Act of 1851, a claim was filed with the Public Land Commission in 1853, and the grant was patented to Mariano Soberanes in 1874.

In 1855, Francisco Rico, grantee of nearby Rancho San Lorenzo, bought all of Rancho San Bernardo.

Meyer Brandenstein (-1906) and a partner, Lazard Godchaux, bought two thirds ( 8,901 acres (36.0 km^{2})) of Rancho San Bernardo in 1871. Alberto Trescony of the adjacent Rancho San Lucas owned the other third (4,445 acres (18.0 km^{2})). Brandenstein and Godchaux organized the San Bernardo and Salinas Valley Canal and Irrigation Company, a large scale irrigation project in Southern Monterey County, in 1884.
