= San Lucas, California =

- Unincorporated Community; Census Designated Place
- Location in Monterey County and the state of California

- Location in the United States
- Coordinates: 36°07′44″N 121°01′14″W
- Country: United States
- State: California
- County: Monterey

Government
  - Senate: John Laird (D)
  - Assembly: Robert Rivas (D)
  - U. S. Congress: Zoe Lofgren (D)

Area
  - Total: 0.394 sq mi (1.021 km^{2})
  - Land: 0.394 sq mi (1.021 km^{2})
  - Water: 0 sq mi (0 km^{2}) 0%
- Elevation: 410 ft (125 m)

Population (2020)
  - Total: 324
  - Density: 822/sq mi (317/km^{2})
- Time zone: UTC-8 (PST)
  - Summer (DST): UTC-7 (PDT)
- ZIP code: 93954
- Area code: 831
- FIPS code: 06-68140
- GNIS feature ID: 0248896

San Lucas (Spanish for "St. Luke") is an unincorporated community and census-designated place (CDP) in Monterey County, California, United States. It was founded in 1886 and named after the Rancho San Lucas, which was granted in 1842. The post office was first established in 1892.

San Lucas is located in the Salinas Valley, on the Salinas River 8 miles (13 km) southeast of King City, at an elevation of 410 feet (120 m).

The population was 324 at the 2020 census, up from 269 in 2010.

== History ==
The Southern Pacific Railroad reached the place in 1886 and named it for the Rancho San Lucas Mexican land grant. The San Lucas post office opened in 1887 (having been transferred from Griswold).

== Geography ==
San Lucas is located in southeastern Monterey County at 36°07′44″N 121°01′14″W, on the east side of the Salinas Valley. U.S. Route 101 runs along the western edge of the community, leading northwest 8 miles (13 km) to King City and 55 miles (89 km) Salinas, the county seat, while leading southeast 42 miles (68 km) to Paso Robles. California State Route 198 leads east from San Lucas across the San Andreas Rift Zone and the Diablo Range 48 miles (77 km) to Coalinga.

According to the United States Census Bureau, the San Lucas CDP has a total area of 0.4 square miles (1.0 km^{2}), all land.

The San Lucas AVA (American Viticultural Area) is located in the area.

=== Climate ===
This region experiences warm (but not hot) and dry summers, with no average monthly temperatures above 71.6 °F. According to the Köppen Climate Classification system, San Lucas has a warm-summer Mediterranean climate, abbreviated "Csb" on climate maps.

== Demographics ==
Historical population
Census	Pop.	Note	%±
2000	419		—
2010	269		−35.8%
2020	324		20.4%
U.S. Decennial Census; 1860–1870 1880-1890; 1900 1910 1920; 1930 1940 1950; 1960 1970 1980; 1990 2000 2010

San Lucas first appeared as a census designated place in the 2000 U.S. census.

=== 2020 ===
The 2020 United States census reported that San Lucas had a population of 324. The population density was 822.3 inhabitants per square mile (317.5/km^{2}). The racial makeup of San Lucas was 139 (42.9%) White, 1 (0.3%) African American, 3 (0.9%) Native American, 1 (0.3%) Asian, 2 (0.6%) Pacific Islander, 137 (42.3%) from other races, and 41 (12.7%) from two or more races. Hispanic or Latino of any race were 302 persons (93.2%).

The whole population lived in households. There were 76 households, out of which 39 (51.3%) had children under the age of 18 living in them, 45 (59.2%) were married-couple households, 10 (13.2%) were cohabiting couple households, 14 (18.4%) had a female householder with no partner present, and 7 (9.2%) had a male householder with no partner present. 8 households (10.5%) were one person, and 2 (2.6%) were one person aged 65 or older. The average household size was 4.26. There were 67 families (88.2% of all households).

The age distribution was 112 people (34.6%) under the age of 18, 31 people (9.6%) aged 18 to 24, 92 people (28.4%) aged 25 to 44, 60 people (18.5%) aged 45 to 64, and 29 people (9.0%) who were 65 years of age or older. The median age was 28.8 years. For every 100 females, there were 100.0 males.

There were 76 housing units at an average density of 192.9 units per square mile (74.5 units/km^{2}), which were all occupied, 27 (35.5%) by homeowners and 49 (64.5%) by renters.

=== 2010 ===
The 2010 United States census reported that San Lucas had a population of 269. The population density was 682.5 inhabitants per square mile (263.5/km^{2}). The racial makeup of San Lucas was 113 (42.0%) White, 0 (0.0%) African American, 4 (1.5%) Native American, 6 (2.2%) Asian, 0 (0.0%) Pacific Islander, 127 (47.2%) from other races, and 19 (7.1%) from two or more races. Hispanic or Latino of any race were 224 persons (83.3%).

The Census reported that 269 people (100% of the population) lived in households, 0 (0%) lived in non-institutionalized group quarters, and 0 (0%) were institutionalized.

There were 67 households, out of which 38 (56.7%) had children under the age of 18 living in them, 46 (68.7%) were opposite-sex married couples living together, 8 (11.9%) had a female householder with no husband present, 3 (4.5%) had a male householder with no wife present. There were 4 (6.0%) unmarried opposite-sex partnerships, and 0 (0%) same-sex married couples or partnerships. 7 households (10.4%) were made up of individuals, and 2 (3.0%) had someone living alone who was 65 years of age or older. The average household size was 4.01. There were 57 families (85.1% of all households); the average family size was 4.23.

The population was spread out, with 87 people (32.3%) under the age of 18, 38 people (14.1%) aged 18 to 24, 74 people (27.5%) aged 25 to 44, 58 people (21.6%) aged 45 to 64, and 12 people (4.5%) who were 65 years of age or older. The median age was 26.3 years. For every 100 females, there were 110.2 males. For every 100 females age 18 and over, there were 111.6 males.

There were 76 housing units at an average density of 192.8 per square mile (74.4/km^{2}), of which 36 (53.7%) were owner-occupied, and 31 (46.3%) were occupied by renters. The homeowner vacancy rate was 0%; the rental vacancy rate was 11.4%. 132 people (49.1% of the population) lived in owner-occupied housing units and 137 people (50.9%) lived in rental housing units.

=== 2000 ===
As of the census of 2000, the median income for a household in the CDP was $31,538, and the median income for a family was $30,536. Males had a median income of $27,000 versus $24,375 for females. The per capita income for the CDP was $7,834. About 23.3% of families and 29.7% of the population were below the poverty line, including 38.2% of those under age 18 and 11.4% of those age 65 or over.

== Government ==
San Lucas is served by the San Lucas Water District.

== See also ==
- List of census-designated places in California
