= Rancho Paso de Robles =

Land grant in California

Coordinates: 35.580°N 120.750°W

Rancho Paso de Robles was a 25,993-acre (105.19 km^{2}) Mexican land grant in present-day San Luis Obispo County, California given in 1844 by Governor Manuel Micheltorena to José Pedro Narváez. The name means "Pass of the Oaks". The grant encompassed present-day Paso Robles and Templeton.

== History ==
The six square league Rancho Paso de Robles grant was made to José Pedro Narváez, a Mexican naval officer, who served as captain of the port of Monterey from 1839 to 1844. Narváez sold Rancho Paso de Robles to Petronilo Ríos in 1845.

Petronilo Ríos (1806–1870) was a Mexican soldier who came to California in the mid-1820s. He married Catarina Avila (1812–1889) in 1832. In the 1830s Ríos was shuttling between Monterey and Mission San Miguel Arcángel where he was corporal commanding the mission guard. In 1835, with local Indian labor, he built the Rios-Caledonia Adobe. In 1839, he was promoted to commander of artillery at the presidio in Monterey, and retired from the military in 1840. In 1842 Ríos obtained the Rancho San Bernabe land grant and moved his family there. In 1845 Ríos moved his family from Rancho San Bernabe to Rancho Paso de Robles. In 1846 William Reed, Miguel Garcia, and Petronilo Ríos bought the San Miguel rancho from Pío Pico. Ríos and his family moved into the Rios-Caledonia Adobe in 1851.

With the cession of California to the United States following the Mexican-American War, the 1848 Treaty of Guadalupe Hidalgo provided that the land grants would be honored. As required by the Land Act of 1851, a claim for Rancho Paso de Robles was filed with the Public Land Commission in 1852, and the grant was patented to Petronilo Ríos in 1886.

In 1857, Ríos sold Rancho Paso de Robles and moved to Santa Clara. The entire rancho was purchased by James H. Blackburn, Daniel Drew Blackburn, natives of Virginia who came to California in 1849, and Lazard Godchaux. In 1860, the partners divided the rancho, with D.D. Blackburn taking one league of land including the hot springs. In 1865, D.D. Blackburn sold a half-interest to Drury W. James. D. W. James had come from Kentucky to California in 1849, and drove cattle from Santa Clara to the gold mines. Later he bought cattle as far south as Los Angeles. James stopped at the Paso Robles springs on a cattle-buying trip in 1851. J.H. Blackburn never married, but D. D. Blackburn and D. W. James married sisters, Celia and Louisa Dunn in 1866. After the death of J.H. Blackburn, there were many lawsuits brought by some of the D. D. Blackburn children for portions of the estate, which had been willed to Mrs. D. D. Blackburn and certain of the children.

== See also ==
- Ranchos of California
- List of Ranchos of California
