= Harold E. Cox =

Transportation historian (1931–2021)

Harold Eugene Cox
- Born: 1931; Lynchburg, Va.
- Died: September 8, 2021 (aged 89–90); Exeter, Pennsylvania
- Occupations: Educator, historian
- Spouse: Robert Reite
- Children: Michael
- Parent(s): James Alfred Cox and Margaret Ethel Trent

Harold Eugene Cox (1931 – 2021) was Professor of History Emeritus and University Archivist at Wilkes University, Pennsylvania serving over 52 years. as department chair of the University Department of History. In 2015, the university renamed one its buildings as Dr. Harold Cox Hall. Cox specialized in the history of 19th and 20th century urban transportation and historical transportation maps. In 1976, he was an editor for the Pennsylvania Historical Association's journal, "Pennsylvania History".

In 1996, Cox inquired about 19th century election statistics for Pennsylvania, only to find that the data would cost $1,000 to produce. He then organized and created the Wilkes University Election Statistics Project as a free online resource documenting Pennsylvania political election results dating back to 1796. The project has been cataloged by the Pennsylvania State University Libraries and the Van Pelt Library at the University of Pennsylvania. It has been cited as a source in academic books about the Supreme Court of the United States, Communist politicians in Pennsylvania, and a survey of state-level political parties.

Cox served in the United States Army from 1954 to 1984, retiring as a command sergeant major.

Cox died in 2021 and was eulogized as a "true renaissance man" with passions and interests ranging from politics to creative writing, trolleys, and LGBTQ rights. He was interred at Spring Hill Cemetery, Lynchburg, Va.

== Bibliography and collections ==
Journals

- Cox, Harold E. "Jim Crow in the City of Brotherly Love; The Segregation of Philadelphia Horse Cars." Negro History Bulletin 26.3 (1962): 119–123.
- Cox, Harold E. "daily Except Sunday:" Blue Laws and the Operation of Philadelphia Horsecars." The Business History Review. 39.2 (1965): 228-242. Print.
- Cox, Harold E., and John F. Meyers. "The Philadelphia Traction Monopoly and the Pennsylvania Constitution of 1874: The Prostitution of an Ideal." Pennsylvania History: A Journal of Mid-Atlantic Studies 35.4 (1968): 406–423.
- Cox, Harold E. "The Wilkes-Barre Street Railway Strike of 1915." The Pennsylvania Magazine of History and Biography. 94.1 (1970): 75–94. Print.

Books and published materials

- Cox, Harold E. PCC Cars of North America. Philadelphia: J.W. Boorse Jr., 1963. Print.
- Cox, Harold E. The Tram Subways of Philadelphia: A History and a Forward Look. Light Railway Transport League, London: W.J. Fowler & Sons, Ltd. 1964. Print.
- Cox, Harold E. Surface Cars of Philadelphia, 1911-1965. Forty Fort, Pa., 1965. Internet resource.
- Cox, Harold E. The Birney Car. Forty Fort, Pa., 1966. Internet resource.
- Charlton, Elbridge H, and Harold E. Cox. Electric Railway Car Trucks. Forty Fort, Pa: H.E. Cox, 1967. Print.
- Cox, Harold E, and Jack May. The Road from Upper Darby: The Story of the Market Street Subway-Elevated. Forty Fort, PA (80 Virginia Terr., Forty Fort 18704: H.E. Cox, 1967.
- Foesig, Harry, and Harold E. Cox. Trolleys of Montgomery County, Pennsylvania. Forty Fort, Pa.: Harold E. Cox, 1968. Print.
- Cox, Harold E. Early Electric Cars of Philadelphia, 1885-1911. Forty Fort - Pa, 1969. Print.
- Cox, Harold E. The Fairmount Park Trolley: A Unique Philadelphia Experiment. Forty Fort, Pa, 1970.
- Cox, Harold E. Utility Cars of Philadelphia, 1892-1971. Forty Fort, Pa, 1972. Print.
- Bowman, Stanley F, and Harold E. Cox. Trolleys of Chester County, Pennsylvania, 1975. Print.
- Hudson, Alvin W, and Harold E. Cox. Street Railways of Birmingham. Birmingham, Ala: Printed and sold by Alvin W. Hudson, 1976. Print.
- Schieck, Paul J, and Harold E. Cox. West Branch Trolleys: Street Railways of Lycoming & Clinton Counties. Forty Fort, Pa: H.E. Cox, 1978. Print.
- Cox, Harold E. Early Electric Cars of Baltimore. Forty Fort, Pa: The Author, 1979.
- Cox, Harold E. Philadelphia Car Routes: Horse, Cable, Electric. Forty Fort (Pa.: H.E. Cox, 1982. Print.
- Sachs, Bernard J, George F. Nixon, and Harold E. Cox. Baltimore Streetcars, 1905-1963: The Semi-Convertible Era. Baltimore: Baltimore Streetcar Museum, 1984. Print.
- Foesig, Harry, Barker Gummere, and Harold E. Cox. Trolleys of Bucks County, Pennsylvania. Forty Fort, PA: Harold E. Cox, 1985. Print.
- Cox, Harold E. Wyoming Valley Trolleys: Street Railways of Wilkes-Barre, Nanticoke and Pittston, Pennsylvania. Forty Fort, PA: H.E. Cox, 1988. Print.
- Cox, Harold E. Diamond State Trolleys: Electric Railways of Delaware. Forty Fort, PA: H.E. Cox, 1991. Print.
- Cox, Harold E, and Jack May. The Road from Upper Darby: The Story of the Market Street Subway-Elevated. Forty Fort, PA (80 Virginia Terr., Forty Fort 18704: H.E. Cox, 2000.
- Bailey, David C, Joseph M. Canfield, and Harold E. Cox. Trolleys in the Land of the Sky: Street Railways of Asheville, N.c. and Vicinity. Forty Fort, Pa: Harold E. Cox, 2000. Print.
- Cox, Harold E. The Barber Car: Electric Traction's Ugly Duckling. Forty Fort, PA (80 Virginia Terrace, Forty Fort 18704: Printed and sold by H.E. Cox, 2002. Print.
- Cox, Harold E, Mary M. Adams, and Nancy Marion. Hill City Trolleys: Street Railways of Lynchburg, Va. Lynchburg, Va: Blackwell Press, 2018. Print.

Reports

- Cox, Harold E. Pennsylvania Election Statistics, 1789–2000. Wilkes-Barre, Pa.: Wilkes University, 1996.

Collections

- Harold E. Cox transportation collection (Collection 3158), The Historical Society of Pennsylvania.
