= Cayucos, California =

Unincorporated community in California

- Unincorporated community census-designated place
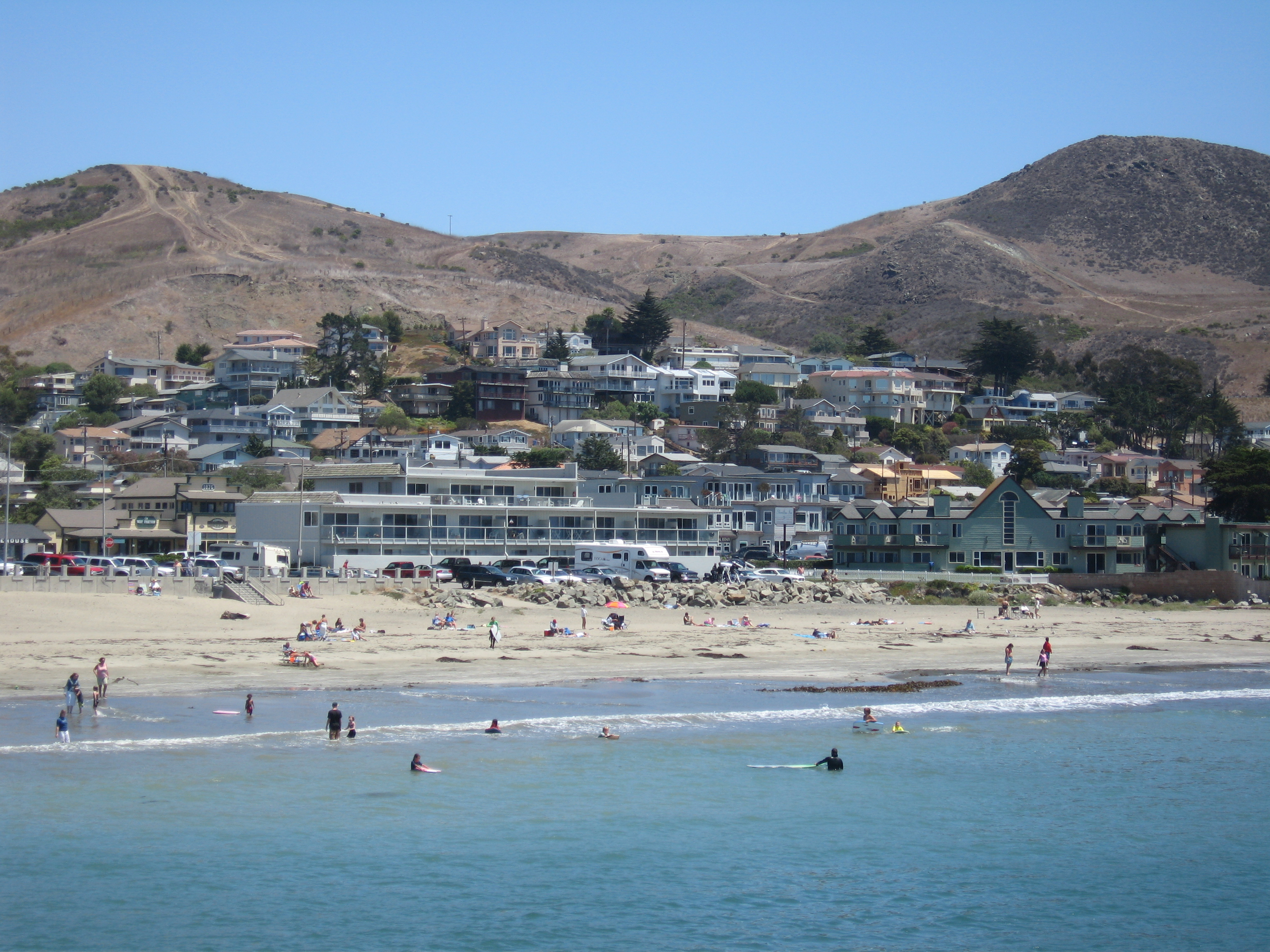
- Cayucos beachfront

- Location in San Luis Obispo County, California

- Location in California
- Coordinates: 35.442751°N 120.892125°W
- Country: United States
- State: California
- County: San Luis Obispo
- Townsite laid out: 1875
- Named for: Rancho Moro y Cayucos

Area
  - Total: 4.03 sq mi (10.45 km^{2})
  - Land: 3.10 sq mi (8.03 km^{2})
  - Water: 0.93 sq mi (2.42 km^{2})
- Elevation: 75 ft (23 m)

Population (2020)
  - Total: 2,505
  - Density: 810/sq mi (312/km^{2})
- Time zone: UTC−08:00 (Pacific)
  - Summer (DST): UTC−07:00 (PDT)
- ZIP code: 93430
- Area codes: 805/820
- FIPS code: 06-12132
- GNIS feature IDs: 1656455 (settlement); 2407994 (CDP)

Cayucos is an unincorporated community in San Luis Obispo County, California, United States. It lies on the Central Coast, along State Route 1, north of Morro Bay. For statistical purposes, the United States Census Bureau has defined Cayucos as a census-designated place (CDP). Its population was 2,505 at the 2020 census, down from 2,592 in 2010.

The surrounding coast has a long Indigenous history associated with the Chumash and Salinan peoples. The town developed around James Cass's shipping business in the nineteenth century and later became a seaside visitor destination. Its waterfront includes Cayucos State Beach and a fishing pier.

Cayucos has an economy of businesses serving residents and visitors, with agriculture in the surrounding rural area. Estero Bluffs State Park protects coastal grassland and shoreline north of the town. The community is older than the county as a whole, with a median age of 57.8 years and 36.4 percent of residents aged 65 or over in 2020. San Luis Obispo County treats water drawn from Whale Rock Reservoir, the Cayucos Sanitary District provides wastewater service, and the Cayucos Elementary School District operates the local school.

== Name ==
The name comes from the Spanish cayuco, a word used in California for small fishing boats and a Spanish rendering of the word kayak. It appears in the name of the Rancho Moro y Cayucos land grant, dated 1837 and 1842. The town was laid out and named in 1875 and appears on the Land Office map of 1879. In Spanish the word denotes a small, flat-bottomed boat traditionally made from a single piece of wood.

== History ==
=== Indigenous history ===
The ancestors of today's Chumash and Salinan peoples inhabited the coast around Cayucos, drawing on both marine and terrestrial resources. A 2022 archaeological review of the area reports more than 8,000 years of human occupation. Spanish missionization brought diseases that caused heavy population losses. The northern San Luis Obispo coast was a zone of interaction between Northern Chumash and Salinan language communities. Archaeological and ethnographic studies have not established a single fixed boundary between them.

Indigenous settlement continued after the mission period. Historical accounts cited in the county's architectural study of the Cass Warehouse describe Native residents at Old Creek when Cass arrived in 1867.

In 2025, the nonprofit associated with the YTT Northern Chumash Tribe was seeking to purchase the former Cayucos Abalone Farm, north of town, for cultural activities and ecological restoration. The proposed acquisition was part of the tribe's effort to regain ancestral land.

=== Settlement and shipping ===
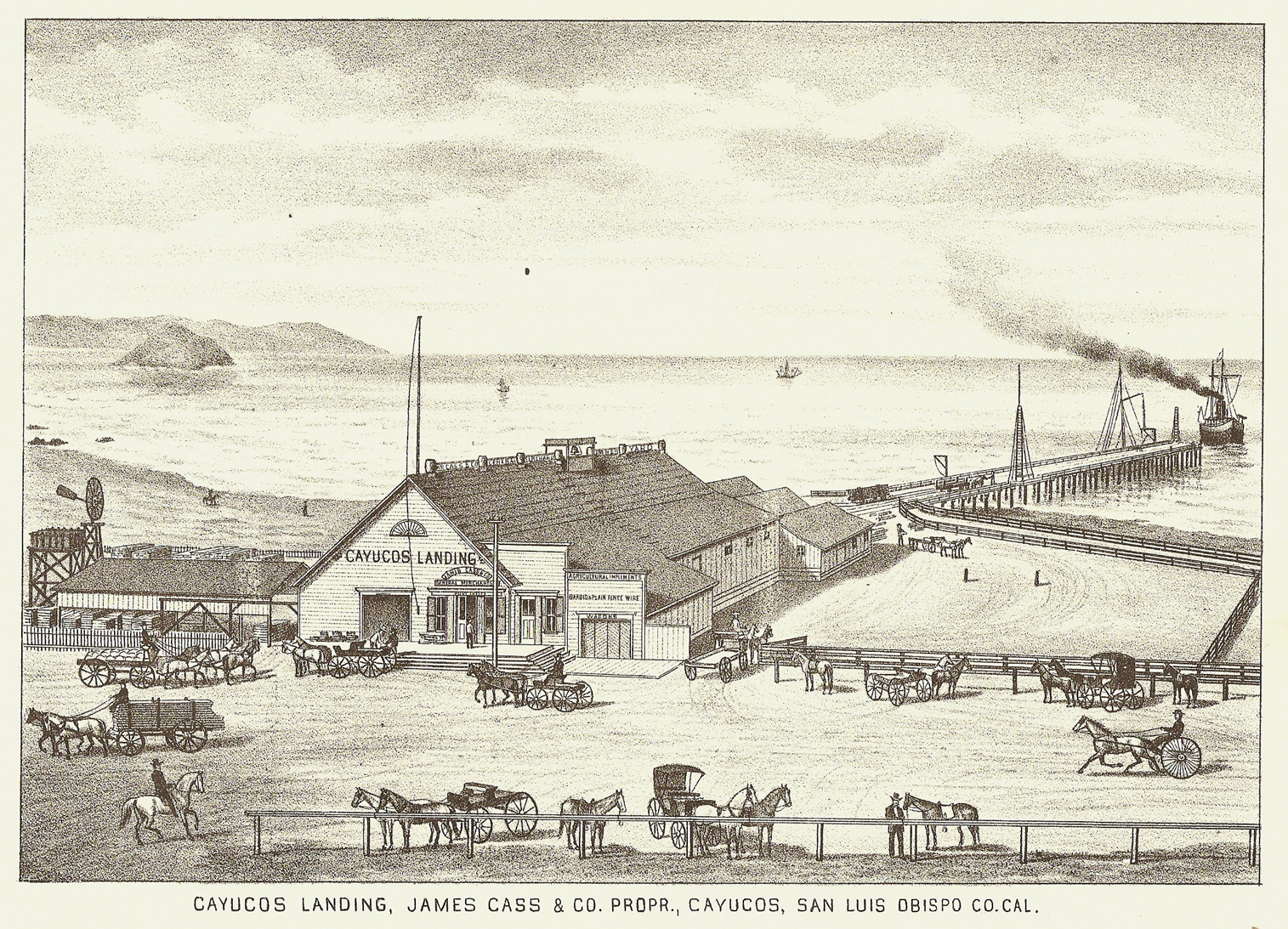
Cayucos Landing in a nineteenth-century illustration

The Portolá expedition passed through the area in 1769 and camped near the northern boundary of what is now Estero Bluffs State Park. The coast subsequently became part of the mission ranching economy.

James Cass moved to the Cayucos area in 1867. He developed a trading and shipping business and began building a wharf in 1872. In 1875, landowner William F. Babcock laid out a townsite beside Cass's Landing. A new warehouse and an enlarged wharf supported the shipment of agricultural products.

A historical marker erected in 1998 by the E Clampus Vitus chapter de la Guerra y Pacheco records that Cass was born in Bristol, England, in 1824, came to New York City as a boy and reached California during the Gold Rush. According to the marker, he persuaded Captain J. N. Ingalls and Frederick Metcalf to join him in a shipping business in 1869, stacking goods on the beach until the wharf was built in 1872; the wharf was the first structure in the township, and Cass patented a new method of driving piles to build it. After William Babcock subdivided the town in 1875, Cass bought the tideland lots, extended the pier 940 feet (287 m) to deep water and built a warehouse in 1877. Cass died in 1917, and his family gave the warehouse and pier to the state. Swiss Italian immigrants from Ticino established dairy ranches in the surrounding country after the drought of the 1860s. Butter and cheese from these ranches were shipped through Cass's wharf.

Chinese immigrants also developed a seaweed industry along the county's northern coast. From the 1860s into the twentieth century, coastal settlements extended south to Villa Creek near Cayucos. Harvesters cultivated sea lettuce, dried it onshore, and shipped it to markets in San Francisco and Hong Kong.

California acquired the warehouse and wharf in 1920. As coastal shipping declined, the wharf became a recreational pier and the warehouse was moved beside its former position at the pier entrance.

=== Later history ===
Construction of Whale Rock Dam on Old Creek began in 1958. The project required the Cayucos–Morro Bay Cemetery to be moved from the reservoir site to a location below the dam. State Route 1 was rerouted around the town in 1965.

On December 7, 1987, Pacific Southwest Airlines Flight 1771 crashed north of Cayucos. All 43 people aboard died. The National Transportation Safety Board identified intentional interference by a passenger and incapacitation of the pilots among its findings.

Winter storms damaged the pier in 2024. In October 2025, the county announced emergency work to remove and relocate an unsupported section of its deck to reduce the risk of further damage.

== Geography ==
The coastline south of Cayucos toward Morro Bay

Cayucos fronts the Pacific Ocean along State Route 1, about 19 miles (31 km) northwest of San Luis Obispo. The Census Bureau's 2020 gazetteer records 3.10 square miles (8.03 km²) of land and 0.93 square miles (2.42 km²) of water within the CDP. The USGS populated-place record gives an elevation of 75 feet (23 m). Cayucos observes Pacific Standard Time (UTC−08:00), changing to Pacific Daylight Time (UTC−07:00) during daylight saving time.

=== Climate ===
The nearest weather station with published climate normals is at the Morro Bay Fire Department, about 6 miles (10 km) south of Cayucos. Over the 1991–2020 period its average monthly high temperature ranged from 64.6 °F (18.1 °C) in December to 72.5 °F (22.5 °C) in October, and average annual precipitation was 17.00 inches (432 mm), nearly all of it falling between November and March.

Climate data for Morro Bay Fire Department, California, 1991–2020 normals
Month	Jan	Feb	Mar	Apr	May	Jun	Jul	Aug	Sep	Oct	Nov	Dec	Year
Mean daily maximum °F (°C)	65.1 (18.4)	65.4 (18.6)	66.0 (18.9)	67.3 (19.6)	66.9 (19.4)	66.4 (19.1)	67.2 (19.6)	69.7 (20.9)	71.5 (21.9)	72.5 (22.5)	69.1 (20.6)	64.6 (18.1)	67.6 (19.8)
Mean daily minimum °F (°C)	46.4 (8.0)	47.8 (8.8)	48.6 (9.2)	49.2 (9.6)	51.7 (10.9)	53.6 (12.0)	56.5 (13.6)	56.8 (13.8)	56.0 (13.3)	54.4 (12.4)	50.2 (10.1)	46.2 (7.9)	51.5 (10.8)
Average precipitation inches (mm)	3.64 (92)	3.62 (92)	3.19 (81)	0.99 (25)	0.42 (11)	0.20 (5.1)	0.07 (1.8)	0.02 (0.51)	0.09 (2.3)	0.68 (17)	1.33 (34)	2.75 (70)	17 (431.71)
Source: NOAA

== Demographics ==
Historical population
Census	Pop.	Note	%±
1970	1,772		—
1980	2,301		29.9%
1990	2,960		28.6%
2000	2,943		−0.6%
2010	2,592		−11.9%
2020	2,505		−3.4%
U.S. Census Bureau

The 2020 census counted 2,505 residents, all living in households. There were 313 residents under 18 (12.5%) and 912 aged 65 or older (36.4%). The median age was 57.8 years.

Of the 1,244 households, 188 (15.1%) included someone under 18, and 451 (36.3%) consisted of one person. Cayucos had 2,382 housing units, of which 1,244 (52.2%) were occupied and 1,138 (47.8%) were vacant. Of occupied units, 782 (62.9%) were owner-occupied and 462 (37.1%) were rented.

Racial composition, 2020 census
Race	Population	Percentage
White	2,094	83.6%
Black or African American	13	0.5%
American Indian and Alaska Native	11	0.4%
Asian	51	2.0%
Native Hawaiian and Other Pacific Islander	1	<0.1%
Some other race	77	3.1%
Two or more races	258	10.3%

Hispanic or Latino residents, who may be of any race, numbered 274 (10.9%).

The 2020–2024 American Community Survey estimated median household income at $87,235, with a margin of error of $16,412, and per capita income at $57,403, with a margin of error of $8,334. Both figures are expressed in 2024 inflation-adjusted dollars.

== Economy ==
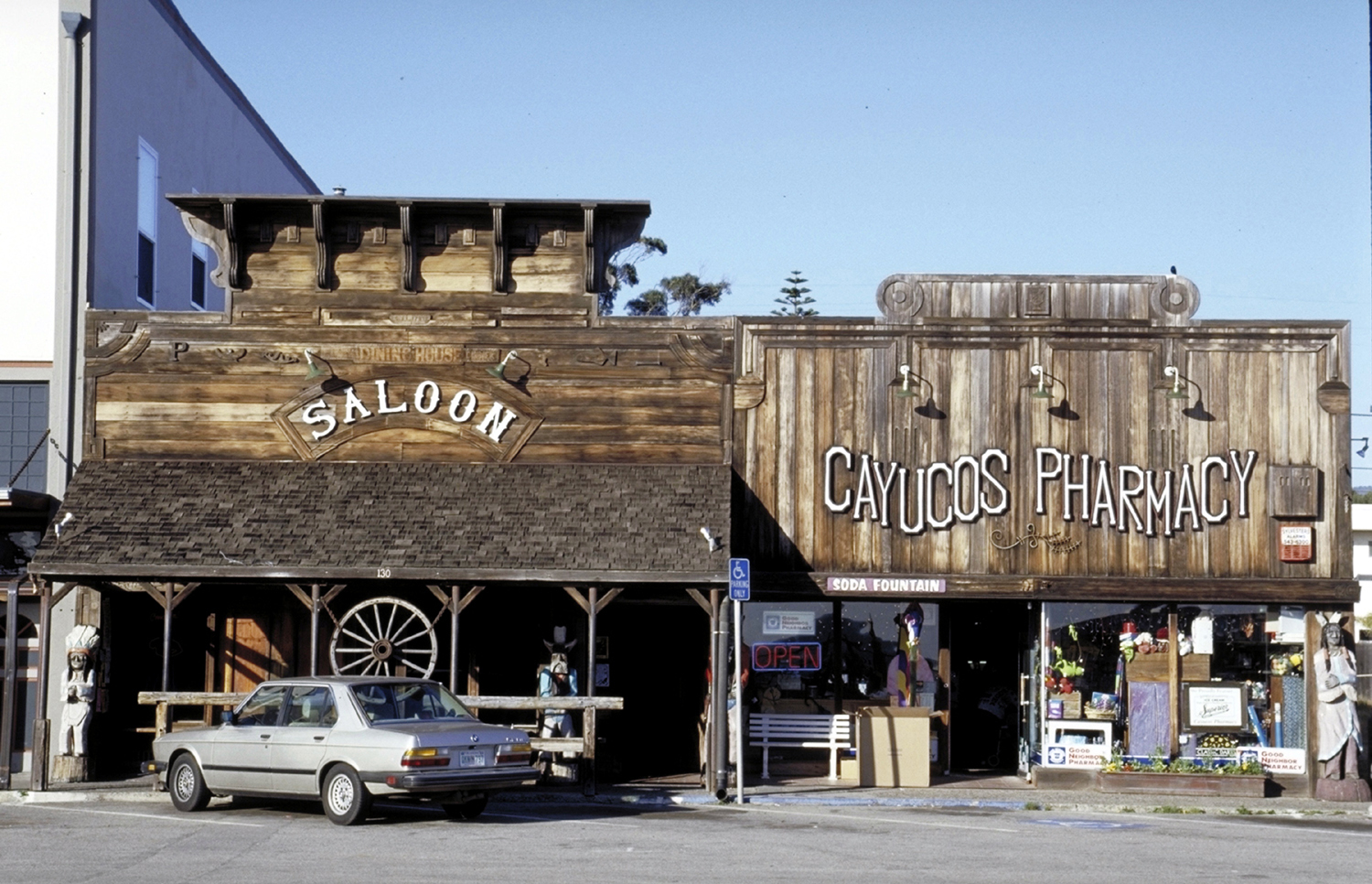
Shops on Ocean Avenue in the commercial core

The county's Estero Area Plan describes an economy based on businesses serving residents and visitors, with agriculture in the surrounding rural area. Its land-use policies identify the commercial core along Ocean Avenue between B Street and Fourth Street and seek to concentrate commercial development there while improving pedestrian access.

== Arts and culture ==
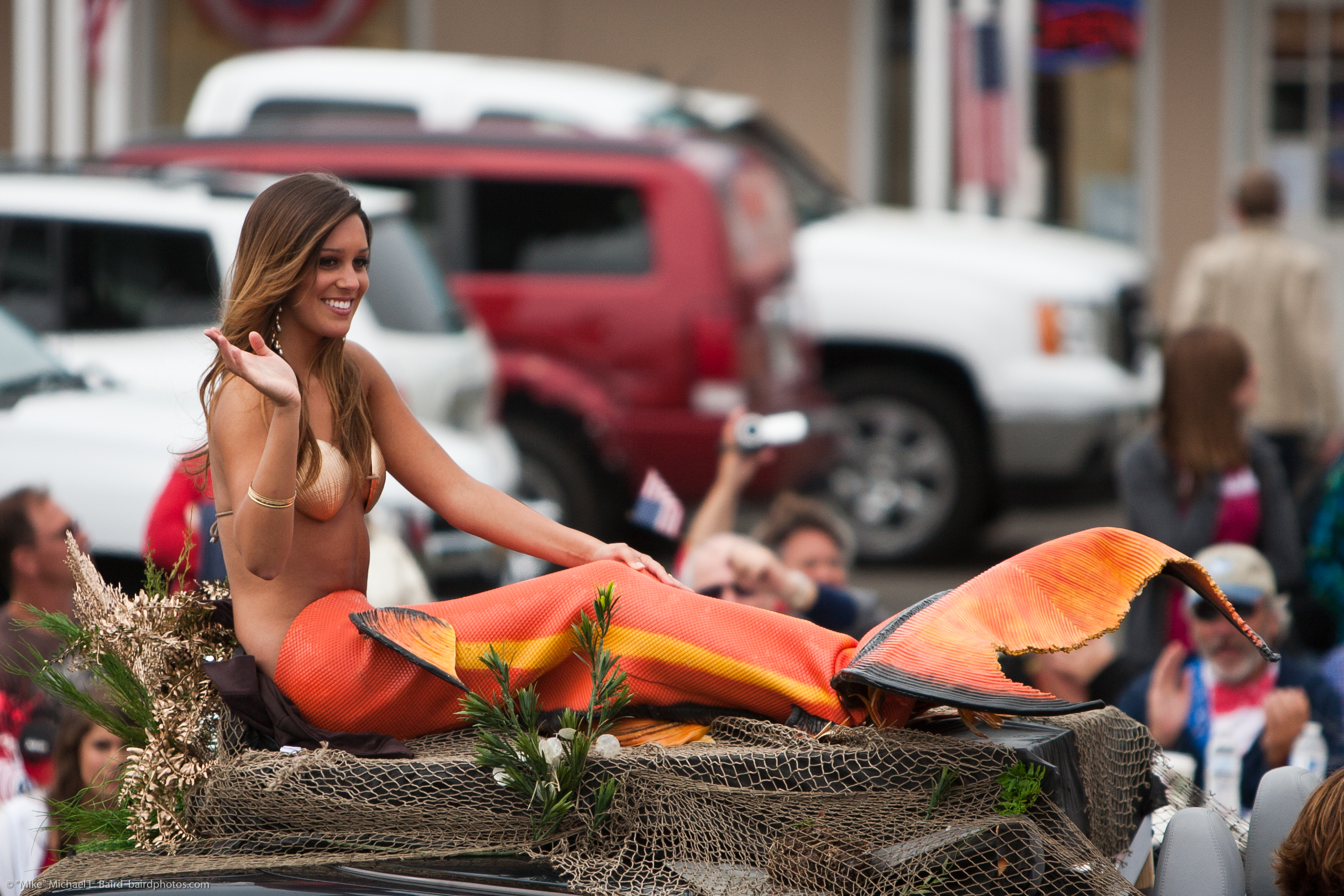
The annual Fourth of July parade, 2010

The Cayucos Chamber of Commerce organizes several annual events. The Carlin Soulé Memorial Polar Bear Dip takes place at the pier on New Year's Day, and the town also holds an antique street faire, a car show and a Christmas event. Cayucos holds an annual Fourth of July parade along Ocean Avenue. The wider celebration includes a street faire, a sand sculpture contest and a fireworks display from the pier.

== Parks and recreation ==
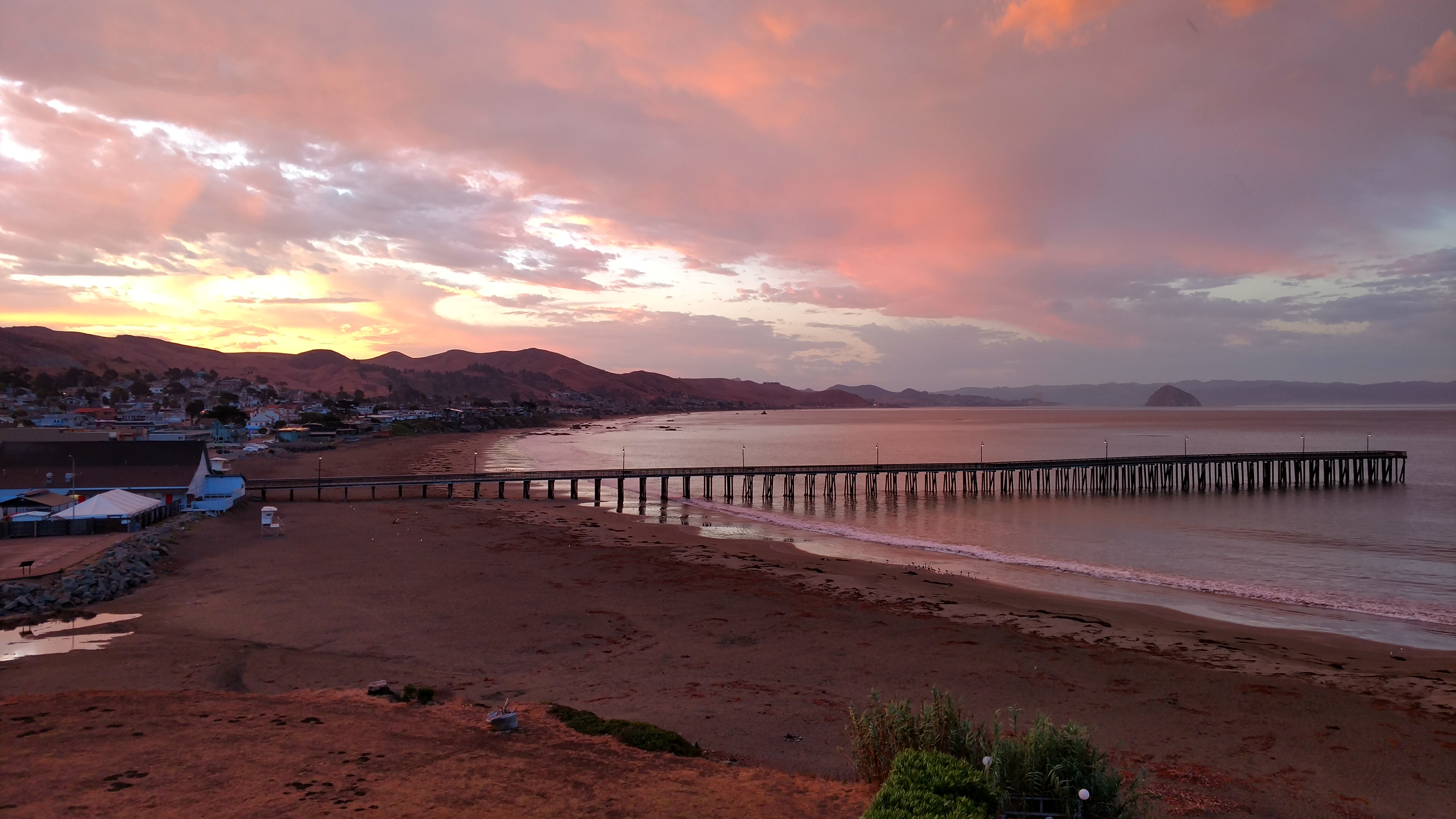
Cayucos State Beach and pier

Cayucos State Beach provides access to swimming, surfing, fishing, and tide pools. Historic commercial buildings near the waterfront house restaurants and shops. The former Cass Warehouse, subsequently used as the Veterans Memorial Hall, reopened on August 25, 2025, after an extended closure and renovation. Renamed Cayucos Landing, the building provides space for public events and community organizations. The Cayucos Historical Society operates a museum in the Veterans Hall annex.

North of town, Estero Bluffs State Park protects coastal grasslands, scrub, wetlands, and rocky shoreline. The Trust for Public Land acquired the property in 2000 and transferred it to the state in 2002, following local opposition to proposed development. A conservation easement held by the Cayucos Land Conservancy limits development of the park.

Hardie Park is a 4-acre (1.6 ha) county park with picnic areas, a playground, and tennis courts.

== Government ==
Cayucos is an unincorporated community within San Luis Obispo County. The Cayucos Citizens Advisory Council is one of the county's authorized community advisory bodies.

== Education ==
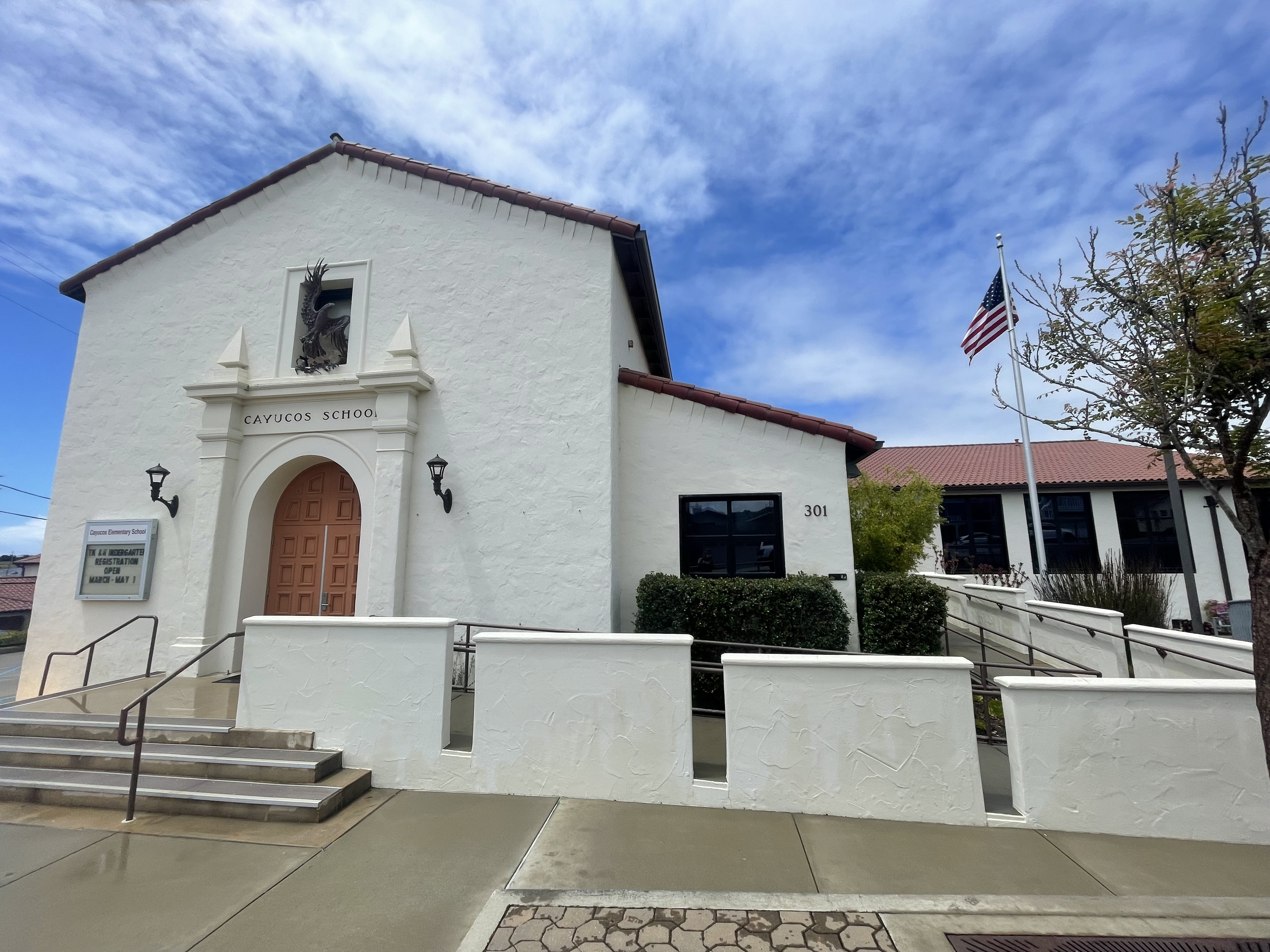
Cayucos Elementary School District

The Cayucos Elementary School District operates one school serving transitional kindergarten through eighth grade. The Census Bureau's 2020 school-district map places most of the CDP in that elementary district and in Coast Unified School District for grades 9–12. A small portion falls within San Luis Coastal Unified School District.

== Media ==
Two FM broadcast facilities are licensed to Cayucos: KPYG on 94.9 MHz, licensed to Dimes Media Corporation, and K216AG on 91.1 MHz, a translator licensed to KCBX, Inc.

== Infrastructure ==
The county operates the Cayucos Water Treatment Plant, which treats water from Whale Rock Reservoir for Cayucos Beach Mutual Water Company, Morro Rock Mutual Water Company, and County Service Area 10A. The Cayucos Sanitary District provides wastewater service and is governed by a five-member elected board. Its Water Resource Recovery Facility was dedicated in June 2021; the district stopped sending wastewater to the Morro Bay treatment plant that September.

San Luis Obispo Regional Transit Authority Route 15 links Cayucos with Morro Bay, Cambria, and San Simeon.
