= Arroyo Grande High School =

Public high school in California, United States

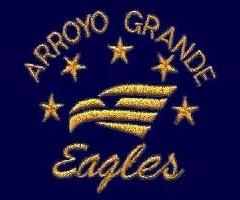

Location
- 495 Valley Road; Arroyo Grande, San Luis Obispo County, CA 93420; United States; 35.116°N 120.58°W

Information
- School type: Public High School
- Motto: "Home of the Eagles"
- Established: Approximately 1890
- Status: Open
- School district: Lucia Mar Unified School District
- CEEB code: 050150
- Principal: Brad Grumbles
- Staff: 103.36 (FTE)
- Faculty: 103 (2007–08)
- Grades: 9–12
- Average class size: 27.3
- Student to teacher ratio: 19.86
- Hours in school day: 7
- Campus type: Urban Fringe of a Mid-size City
- Colors: Blue and gold
- Athletics: Varsity and junior varsity baseball, basketball, cheerleading, cross country, football, golf, soccer, softball, swimming, track and field, tennis, volleyball, water polo, and wrestling, color guard
- Mascot: Eagle
- Team name: Eagles
- CAHSEE average: English-Language Arts (ELA): 89% Pass (2008); Mathematics: 88% Pass (2008)
- Yearbook: Aerie
- Communities served: Arroyo Grande, Grover Beach, Pismo Beach, Oceano
- Alumni: See Notable alumni
- California Academic Performance Index Ranking: 2008 Base API: 773 2007 Base API: 762 2007 Statewide Rank: 8
- Website: www.aghseagles.org

Arroyo Grande High School (AGHS) is an American public high school located in Arroyo Grande, California. It serves grades 9–12 as part of the Lucia Mar Unified School District (LMUSD).

== Campus ==
The majority of classrooms are arranged in rows, starting with the 200s wing at the front of the school, and the 800 wing at the back of the school. The athletic fields bisect the school. The eastern portion of the school contains the 900 wing, or "Orchard" as it is called due to its proximity to Orchard Avenue. The 100 wing is primarily school administration. The 200s and 300s are mostly for social sciences and humanities. The 400s and 500s are where most language courses are taught. 600s and 700s are where the technical and scientific courses are held. The 800 wing contains the Inquiry Center, school farm, and other industrial, technology, occupational skills courses and additional science classes. The 900s are home to mathematics, business, foreign language and arts courses.

The Inquiry Center is the school's library, which also accommodates a variety of electronic data acquisition tools, including remote access data retrieval, CD-ROM compact disks, and a multiple user computer network.

=== 2005–2008 renovation project ===
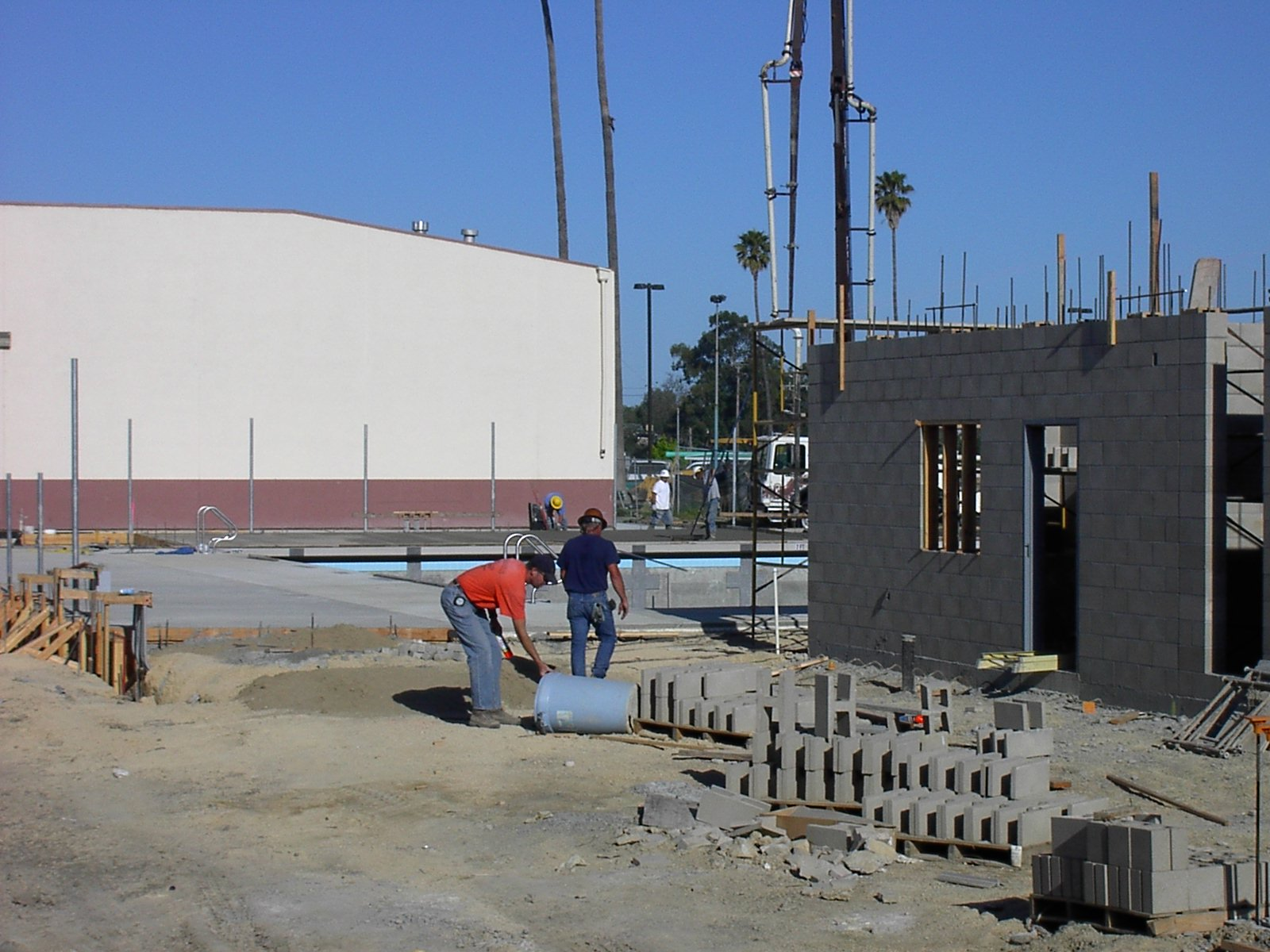
New pool and poolhouse construction

In 2004, local voters passed a school bond, Measure A-04. Its objective was "to repair, upgrade, equip and construct school facilities at Arroyo Grande High School, including the school library and restrooms, upgrade electrical wiring to accommodate technology, install energy efficient heating/ventilation systems, classrooms, cafeterias, plumbing, qualify for State matching funds, reduce overcrowding, by issuing $21,350,000 of bonds at legal interest rates, appoint a Citizens' Oversight Committee and perform annual audits to ensure that no bond money is wasted or used for administrator's salaries".

The Citizen's Oversight Committee oversaw the project. The first phase, in 2005, involved renovation of restrooms and drainage systems, and extensive renovation of the 500 wing of classrooms. In 2006, the other classroom wings on the Valley Road side of campus were renovated, and a new swimming pool was completed on the old tennis court site. The third phase included a new administration and student support center, and a new multi-purpose room with food services. The old administration building was demolished, with the administrative staff temporarily relocated to a building across from the library. The final phase involved new tennis courts, a food court, and a parking area located in a section of campus previously used by the maintenance department and some old classrooms that were removed. The construction was completed in September 2008.

== Extracurricular activities ==
=== Sports ===
Arroyo Grande High School competes in the CIF Central Section in the Mountain League and is a member of the Central Coast Athletic Association.

AGHS, along with its peers in San Luis Obispo County and northern Santa Barbara County (Santa Maria), moved from the Southern Section of the CIF into the Central Section in January 2017 (actually starting to play there as members beginning in August 2018), approved by 38 Central Section athletic directors.

==== Sports at Arroyo Grande High School include ====
- Baseball
- Basketball
- Cross country
- American football
- Golf
- Soccer
- Softball
- Swimming
- Track and field
- Tennis
- Volleyball
- Water polo
- Wrestling
- Bowling

==== CIF Southern California Regional Titles ====
- Boys Basketball: 2020 (Div. III)

==== CIF State Titles ====
- Boys Track & Field: 2001 (28 points, Hughes Stadium)

== Notable alumni ==
Athletes

- Mickey Jannis, class of 2006 - Major League Baseball pitcher
- Thornton Lee, class of 1925 - Major League Baseball player
- Jamie Martin, class of 1988 - National Football League player
- Jim Skaggs, class of 1958 - Philadelphia Eagles offensive lineman
- Stephanie Brown Trafton, class of 1998 - 2008 Olympic gold medalist in discus
- Jimy Williams - Major League Baseball player

Business, technology and media

- Chris Burkard, class of 2004 — action photographer and 2010 overall winner of Red Bull Illume Photo Contest
- Randall Pitchford, class of 1989 — video game creator (Duke Nukem 3D, Halo: Combat Evolved, Brothers in Arms (video game), Borderlands (video game))

Performers

- Zac Efron, class of 2006 — actor
- Aaron Metchik, class of 1998 — acting coach and actor (The Torkelsons)
- Harry Shum Jr., class of 2000 — actor (Glee; Shadowhunters)

Politics and government

- Roy Ashburn, class of 1972 — California State Senator

== See also ==
- Lucia Mar Unified School District
- San Luis Obispo County high schools
