= California State Route 227 =

Highway in California

State Route 227
- SR 227 highlighted in red

Route information
- Maintained by Caltrans
- Length: 15.612 mi (25.125 km)
- Existed: 1964–present

Major junctions
- South end: US 101 in Arroyo Grande
- North end: US 101 / SR 1 in San Luis Obispo

Location
- Country: United States
- State: California
- County: San Luis Obispo

Highway system
- State highways in California; Interstate; US; State; Scenic; History; Pre‑1964; Unconstructed; Deleted; Freeways
| ← SR 225 | → SR 228 |

State Route 227 (SR 227) is a state highway in the U.S. state of California and located in San Luis Obispo County. It is an alternate route of U.S. Route 101 (US 101) between Arroyo Grande and the city of San Luis Obispo, serving the community of Edna and San Luis Obispo County Regional Airport. Though some maps and signs may mark SR 227 as continuous between US 101 and Huasna Road in Arroyo Grande, and within San Luis Obispo, control of those segments of the route within those cities were relinquished to that local jurisdiction and is thus no longer officially part of the state highway system. There is also an unconstructed routing from State Route 1 south of Oceano to its present terminus in Arroyo Grande.

== Route description ==
Route 227 is defined in section 527, subsection (a) of the California Streets and Highways Code, and that the highway is "from Route 1 south of Oceano to Route 101 in San Luis Obispo". Route 227 is not fully constructed to extend south to Route 1 as it is defined. And while control of the segment of Route 232 between US 101 and north of Huasna Road in Arroyo Grande, and the entire segment within San Luis Obispo, have been relinquished by the state to those cities, subdivision (b) further mandates that those cities must still "maintain within their respective jurisdictions signs directing motorists to the continuation of Route 227".

SR 227 starts at the intersection of US 101 and Grand Avenue/Branch Street in Arroyo Grande. It travels east on Branch Street through the Village, which is the historic downtown section of Arroyo Grande. The route then turns north onto Corbett Canyon Road. After a short distance, the road turns onto Carpenter Canyon Road. The route leaves Arroyo Grande, and enters a more rural setting. It continues north, winding through the rolling hills. At Edna, the road’s name changes to Edna Road. This is also the location of Price Canyon Road, a county road which goes to Pismo Beach. The route continues north and enters the city of San Luis Obispo near the airport. The road’s name changes to Broad Street. The route continues north through flat, urban setting. At South Street, it turns west towards its terminus at US 101. The route turns south onto Higuera Street, then west onto Madonna Road, before it terminates at US 101.

The southernmost portion of SR 227 is part of the National Highway System, a network of highways that are considered essential to the country's economy, defense, and mobility by the Federal Highway Administration.

== History ==
SR 227 was adopted as a state route in 1933 as Legislative Route 147. It was an unsigned highway running from LRN 2 near Arroyo Grande to LRN 2 near San Luis Obispo (LRN 2 is currently known as US 101). In 1964 during the renumber of California state routes, LRN 147 became SR 227, and became a signed route. However, except for the new route number, the highway did not change. In 1968, a southern extension to SR 1 south of Oceano was added to its definition. That extension has never been constructed. Control of the segment of the highway through the Village in Arroyo Grande between US 101 and north of Huasna Road was relinquished to the city in 2008. Control of the segment of the highway in San Luis Obispo was relinquished to the city in 2010.

== Future ==
Increasing traffic on the route, especially during peak periods, has required improving capacity on the highway. Some sections of the road are located in places where widening could be difficult. Two different proposals are being considered, in which one or both might be implemented. The two portions which are potential problems are the portion running through the Village in Arroyo Grande (which is the historic downtown), and the road between Arroyo Grande and Edna.

The first proposal is to build a new road around the Village to the south. This would require a new connection with US 101 (or possibly use an existing interchange on another road). It would also require a new alignment for a future connection with SR 1, if that unconstructed portion remains in the route definition. The second proposal would remove the route completely from Arroyo Grande. Because of the terrain between Arroyo Grande and Edna, it was proposed by the county to move the state route to another road which would be easier to expand. The proposal would move SR 227 onto Price Canyon Road at Edna. This would move the terminus to US 101 or SR 1 in Pismo Beach instead of Arroyo Grande. It is not known when either of these proposals would be implemented.

== Major intersections ==
Except where prefixed with a letter, postmiles were measured on the road as it was in 1964, based on the alignment that existed at the time, and do not necessarily reflect current mileage. Postmile prefixes include: R reflecting a realignment in the route since then, M indicating a second realignment, L referring to an overlap due to a correction or change, and T indicating postmiles classified as temporary. Segments that remain unconstructed or have been relinquished to local control may be omitted. The entire route is in San Luis Obispo County.

| Location | Postmile | Destinations | Notes |
|---|---|---|---|
| Arroyo Grande | 0.00 | Grand Avenue | Continuation beyond US 101; serves Dignity Health – Arroyo Grande Community Hospital |
| Arroyo Grande | 0.00 | US 101 | Interchange; south end of SR 227; US 101 exit 187A |
| Arroyo Grande | 0.92 | Huasna Road | |
| Arroyo Grande | 0.97 | South end of state maintenance at 250 feet north of Huasna Road | |
| Edna | 7.12 | Price Canyon Road – Pismo Beach | |
| San Luis Obispo | R10.26 | North end of state maintenance at San Luis Obispo southern city limit | |
| San Luis Obispo | R14.06 | US 101 (SR 1) | Interchange; north end of SR 227; US 101 exit 201 |
| San Luis Obispo | R14.06 | Madonna Road | Continuation beyond US 101 |
1.000 mi = 1.609 km; 1.000 km = 0.621 mi
