= Los Ranchos =

Los Ranchos may refer to:

- Los Ranchos, California
- Los Ranchos de Albuquerque, New Mexico
