= San Luis Obispo County Search and Rescue =

San Luis Obispo County Sheriff's Search & Rescue Team
- Active: 1972 - Present
- Type: All volunteer, SAR
- Role: Search and Rescue
- Size: 50 active members
- Part of: San Luis Obispo County Sheriff's Office
- Garrison/HQ: San Luis Obispo, California, United States
- Nickname: SLOSAR
- Motto: ...so that others may live.
- Colors: Orange and Black
- Website: www.slosar.org

San Luis Obispo County Sheriff Search and Rescue is an all-volunteer organization in San Luis Obispo County within the county's Sheriff's office. With approximately fifty active members year round, San Luis Obispo County's Search and Rescue (SLOSAR) responds to searches for missing people, evidence and other search requests in the county and on mutual aid calls anywhere in the state of California. SLOSAR is a National Association of Search and Rescue (NASAR) Type II certified team able to handle urban and wilderness searches below 7,000 feet in elevation.

== Teams ==
SLOSAR fields eight specialized teams that train monthly:

=== Ground Team ===
The Ground Team provides the manpower for the sheriff to search for missing persons in the unincorporated areas of San Luis Obispo County. When called in as mutual aid locally, the unit provides service to the cities in San Luis Obispo County. The unit also gets called by the state to provide mutual aid to other counties in California. All Search and Rescue members are trained in ground search. Specialized search skills include land navigation, GPS, map and compass, man tracking, and survival training. Training includes practice searches, overnight campouts, classroom training and out of county training with other countries and State and Federal agencies.

=== K9 Team ===
The mission of the SLOSAR K9 Team is to "provide fully trained and qualified California state certified handlers and canines to local, state and national agencies for the purpose of searching for and locating lost people." This team works as part of the whole SLOSAR unit and trains weekly to maintain a high level of excellence and professionalism. Team certifications include Area search, Trailing, Cadaver/Human Remains Detection and Desert.

=== Quad Team ===
The Quad Team consists of Search and Rescue members who have attended the required ATV training and ride ATVs to assist in searches in rural, wilderness and beach areas.

=== Medical Team ===
The Medical Team consists of Search and Rescue members who hold a minimum certification of Emergency Medical Technician (EMT). Many of the team members work in the medical community and contribute skills and expertise from their backgrounds and experience in emergency response. SLOSAR’s Continuing Education Program allows these members to maintain their certification through ongoing training which provides continuing education credit for EMTs, Paramedics, and RNs. The team’s primary responsibility is providing medical care for Search and Rescue members and for the citizens of San Luis Obispo County who are in need.

=== Mountain Bike Team ===
The Mountain Bike (MTB) Team gives the San Luis Obispo Search and Rescue (SLOSAR) unit the ability to quickly cover ground where other resources may not be as efficient or effective, both in wilderness and urban environments. In addition to the many applications of mountain bikes in Search and Rescue, the MTB Team performs hasty and route/area searches, supports ground teams with reconnaissance, patrol/containment of roads and trails, delivery of supplies, and expedites the response of emergency medical support. The MTB Team is trained and equipped to operate during day and nighttime hours.

=== Technical Rescue Team ===
The Technical Rescue Team provides services for SLOSAR that require the technical expertise in controlled horizontal and vertical access and egress, including victim evacuation. The team training strives to provide a knowledge base for which each team member can draw upon and evaluate a situation and apply the ropework and rigging skills required to create a safe, effective, and efficient rescue system.

Team members knowledge and skills include safety procedures, equipment capabilities, knots, rappelling, belaying, ascending, anchors and anchor systems, rigging for raising and lowering systems, litter handling, patient packaging, single victim rescue, self-rescue, and problem solving. The environments that the team can find itself include vertical, high angle, and low angle cliff-side rope rescue, swiftwater and flood rescue, and urban heavy rescue.

=== 4WD Team ===
Members of Search and Rescue with 4x4 vehicles form the 4WD Team. They provide transportation and support to the remote areas of the county and assist medical teams on the Pismo State Dunes. Vehicle teams are used for “hasty” searches of trails, streets, roads and as attraction devices to bring missing people to the searchers. Most areas of the county are a short distance from some form of road or trail and the vehicle team transports the search teams to their assignments. Training includes practice in rock crawling, mud and water driving and driving in the sand dunes.

=== Communications Team ===
The Communications Team provides the equipment and skills to assist the Search and Rescue team with their duties while in the field. The team mans the communications vehicle and assists the command team in deploying resources to the search area. The dispatcher monitors radio traffic and makes contact with the teams in the field. The team is responsible for keeping an inventory of all department-owned communications equipment in addition to training Search and Rescue team members in the proper use of the equipment.

== See also ==
- Search and Rescue
- Wilderness First Aid
