= Paso Robles Joint Unified School District =

School district in California, United States

Address
- 800 Niblick Road Paso Robles, California, 93446; United States

District information
- Type: Public
- Grades: K–12
- Schools: Elementary 6 Middle 2 High 3
- NCES District ID: 0600048

Students and staff
- Students: 6,661 (2020–2021)
- Teachers: 276.51 (FTE)
- Staff: 373.74 (FTE)
- Student–teacher ratio: 24.09:1

Other information
- Website: www.pasoschools.org

Paso Robles Joint Unified School District is a public school district based in Paso Robles, northern San Luis Obispo County, California, United States.

For grades PK-12 the district includes Paso Robles, Whitley Gardens, and a portion of Lake Nacimiento. For grades 9-12 only it includes the other part of Lake Nacimiento as well as Oak Shores and San Miguel.

== School ==
=== High School ===
- Paso Robles High School
- Liberty High (Alternative Education)
- independence High (Alternative Education)

=== Junior High ===
- Lewis Flamson Junior High

=== Elementary ===
- Glen Speck Elementary
- Kermit King Elementary
- Pat Butler Elementary
- Virginia Peterson Elementary
- Winifred Pifer Elementary

=== K-8 ===
Georgia Brown Dual Immersion ( It will become K-8 in the 2026-2027 School year)
