= Los Berros, California =

Los Berros
- census-designated place
- Position in California.
- Coordinates: 35°04′51″N 120°32′42″W
- Country: United States
- State: California
- County: San Luis Obispo

Area
  - Total: 2.512 sq mi (6.507 km^{2})
  - Land: 2.512 sq mi (6.507 km^{2})
  - Water: 0 sq mi (0 km^{2}) 0%
- Elevation: 194 ft (59 m)

Population (2020)
  - Total: 623
  - Density: 248/sq mi (95.7/km^{2})
- Time zone: UTC-8 (Pacific (PST))
  - Summer (DST): UTC-7 (PDT)
- GNIS feature ID: 2583063

Los Berros (Spanish for The Watercresses) is a census-designated place in San Luis Obispo County, California. Los Berros sits at an elevation of 194 feet (59 m). The 2020 United States census reported Los Berros's population was 623.

== Geography ==
According to the United States Census Bureau, the CDP covers an area of 2.5 square miles (6.5 km^{2}), all land.

== Demographics ==
Historical population
Census	Pop.	Note	%±
2010	641		—
2020	623		−2.8%
U.S. Decennial Census; 1850–1870 1880-1890; 1900 1910 1920; 1930 1940 1950; 1960 1970 1980; 1990 2000 2010

Los Berros first appeared as a census designated place in the 2010 U.S. census.

The 2020 United States census reported that Los Berros had a population of 623. The population density was 247.9 inhabitants per square mile (95.7/km^{2}). The racial makeup of Los Berros was 441 (70.8%) White, 7 (1.1%) African American, 3 (0.5%) Native American, 16 (2.6%) Asian, 0 (0.0%) Pacific Islander, 44 (7.1%) from other races, and 112 (18.0%) from two or more races. Hispanic or Latino of any race were 141 persons (22.6%).

The census reported that 614 people (98.6% of the population) lived in households, 9 (1.4%) lived in non-institutionalized group quarters, and no one was institutionalized.

There were 217 households, out of which 61 (28.1%) had children under the age of 18 living in them, 153 (70.5%) were married-couple households, 3 (1.4%) were cohabiting couple households, 31 (14.3%) had a female householder with no partner present, and 30 (13.8%) had a male householder with no partner present. 35 households (16.1%) were one person, and 20 (9.2%) were one person aged 65 or older. The average household size was 2.83. There were 178 families (82.0% of all households).

The age distribution was 125 people (20.1%) under the age of 18, 64 people (10.3%) aged 18 to 24, 131 people (21.0%) aged 25 to 44, 168 people (27.0%) aged 45 to 64, and 135 people (21.7%) who were 65 years of age or older. The median age was 44.5 years. For every 100 females, there were 105.6 males.

There were 235 housing units at an average density of 93.5 units per square mile (36.1 units/km^{2}), of which 217 (92.3%) were occupied. Of these, 161 (74.2%) were owner-occupied, and 56 (25.8%) were occupied by renters.

== Education ==
Los Berros is served by the Lucia Mar Unified School District.
