= Woodlands, California =

Census-designated place in California

Woodlands
- Census-designated place
- Location of Woodlands Woodlands (the United States)
- Coordinates (Census reference point): 35°01′44″N 120°33′09″W
- Country: United States
- State: California
- County: San Luis Obispo
- Geographic area: Nipomo Mesa
- Specific plan adopted: December 15, 1998
- First census designation: 2010

Government
  - Type: County government
  - Body: San Luis Obispo County Board of Supervisors

Area
  - Total: 1.65 sq mi (4.28 km^{2})
  - Land: 1.65 sq mi (4.28 km^{2})
  - Water: 0 sq mi (0 km^{2}) 0%
- 2020 Census boundary
- Elevation (Census reference point (approximate)): 278 ft (85 m)

Population (2020)
  - Total: 1,933
  - Density: 1,170/sq mi (452/km^{2})
- Time zone: UTC−8 (Pacific (PST))
  - Summer (DST): UTC−7 (PDT)
- ZIP Code: 93444 (Nipomo mailing address)
- Area codes: 805 and 820
- GNIS feature ID: 2583186
- FIPS code: 06-86380

Woodlands is a census-designated place in San Luis Obispo County, California, United States. It is on the southwestern edge of the Nipomo Mesa, east of State Route 1, near Nipomo. Its population was 1,933 at the 2020 census, up from 576 in 2010. The community includes the Trilogy at Monarch Dunes residential development.

== History ==
The Nipomo area was within the historical territory of the Northern Chumash, also known as the Obispeño. A 2004 environmental review of the Nipomo area describes archaeological sites more than 5,000 years old in the wider Arroyo Grande, Oceano, and Nipomo area. It also records sites along the southern edge of Nipomo Mesa near the Woodlands property.

An archaeological survey conducted in January 1996 identified prehistoric stone artifacts on the Woodlands property, including a projectile-point fragment and chert flakes. One flake was debris from finishing a stone knife or projectile point. The survey recorded one site containing both prehistoric and historic material, a separate prehistoric artifact, and five historic sites. Much of the property was covered by eucalyptus forest, which limited the visibility of archaeological material on the surface.

The San Luis Obispo County Board of Supervisors adopted the Woodlands Specific Plan on December 15, 1998. The county's village planning area covers about 957 acres (387 ha) and was planned for residential development, recreation and resort facilities, business parks, and retail uses.

== Development plans ==
On June 6, 2023, the Board of Supervisors approved amendments to the Monarch Dunes Specific Plan governing four development sites. The plans relocated a proposed hotel to the Village Center, alongside shops and condominiums, and provided for duplexes on land previously designated for the hotel and a public park. A public walking trail was approved in place of the park.

The hotel proposal called for 65 rooms, with its entrance on Trilogy Parkway. Some residents opposed its relocation because of noise and traffic concerns; others supported a hotel for visiting friends and relatives. At the time of the specific-plan approval, the hotel's detailed design still required a separate conditional use permit.

In February 2024, the county Planning Commission approved a conditional use permit for a 134-unit assisted-living and memory-care facility in the Monarch Dunes planning area. The plans were for a 4.5-acre (1.8 ha) site and replaced an earlier approval whose entitlement had expired in 2023. The developer was seeking financing when the approval was reported and had not announced a completion date.

On July 6, 2026, the county approved a mixed-use Village Center project with two retail buildings and four buildings combining ground-floor commercial space with residential condominiums above. The approved plans included 40 two-bedroom condominiums and 28,259 square feet (2,625 m^{2}) of commercial space, together with parking, landscaping, and utility improvements.

== Geography ==
According to the United States Census Bureau, the CDP has a land area of 1.652 square miles (4.28 km^{2}), with no water area. At the Census reference point, a USGS digital terrain model gives an approximate elevation of 278 feet (85 m).

For Census statistical purposes, Woodlands overlaps ZIP Code Tabulation Areas 93420 and 93444.

The San Luis Obispo County Board of Supervisors sets governing policies for the county's unincorporated areas, including Woodlands.

== Demographics ==
Historical population
Census	Pop.	Note	%±
2010	576		—
2020	1,933		235.6%
U.S. census

Woodlands first appeared as a census-designated place in the 2010 U.S. census.

=== 2020 census ===
As of the 2020 census, Woodlands had a population of 1,933. The population density was 1,170.1 inhabitants per square mile (451.8/km^{2}). The median age was 67.8 years. The age distribution was 2.5% under the age of 18, 2.6% aged 18 to 24, 7.9% aged 25 to 44, 26.4% aged 45 to 64, and 60.6% who were 65 years of age or older. For every 100 females, there were 87.5 males, and for every 100 females age 18 and over there were 88.0 males age 18 and over.

98.0% of residents lived in urban areas, while 2.0% lived in rural areas.

The whole population lived in households. There were 993 households, of which 7.2% had children under the age of 18 living in them. Of all households, 80.2% were married-couple households, 2.4% were cohabiting couple households, 6.4% were households with a male householder and no spouse or partner present, and 11.0% were households with a female householder and no spouse or partner present. About 13.3% of all households were made up of individuals, and 10.8% had someone living alone who was 65 years of age or older. The average household size was 1.95. There were 840 families (84.6% of all households).

There were 1,137 housing units at an average density of 688.3 units per square mile (265.8 units/km^{2}). Of these, 993 (87.3%) were occupied and 12.7% were vacant. Of occupied units, 91.0% were owner-occupied and 9.0% were occupied by renters. The homeowner vacancy rate was 2.1% and the rental vacancy rate was 4.1%.

Racial composition as of the 2020 census
Race	Number	Percent
White	1,732	89.6%
Black or African American	19	1.0%
American Indian and Alaska Native	5	0.3%
Asian	67	3.5%
Native Hawaiian and other Pacific Islander	2	0.1%
Some other race	20	1.0%
Two or more races	88	4.6%
Hispanic or Latino (of any race)	95	4.9%

=== Income and poverty ===
The 2020–2024 American Community Survey estimated a median household income of $136,618 (with a margin of error of ±$55,369) and a per capita income of $81,602 (±$13,781), in 2024 dollars. It estimated that 5.4% of residents lived below the poverty line.

== Education ==
Woodlands is within the Lucia Mar Unified School District.

== See also ==
- Guadalupe-Nipomo Dunes
- List of census-designated places in California
