= Lake Nacimiento, California =

Lake Nacimiento
- census-designated place
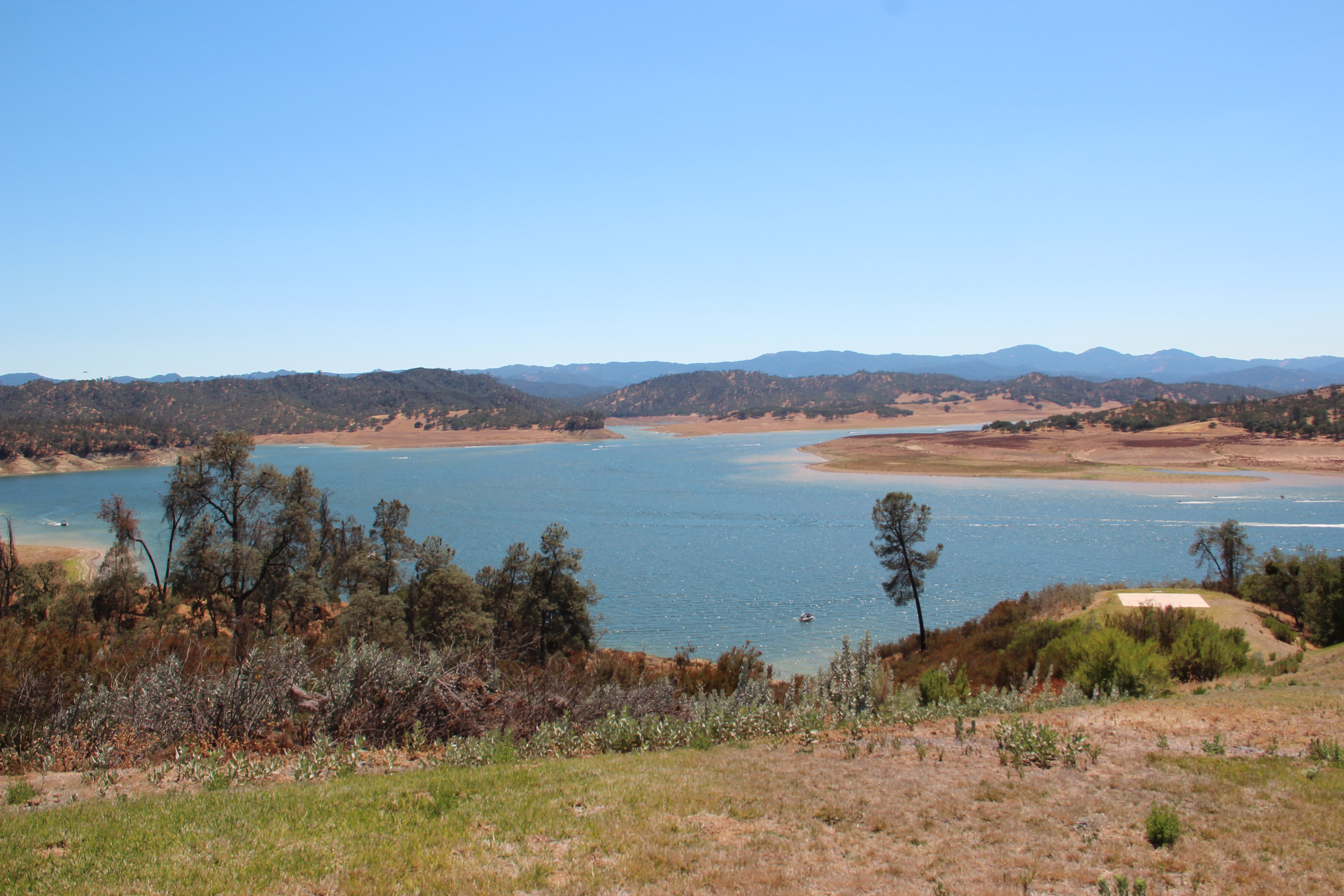
- Lake Nacimiento
- Nickname: The Dragon Lake
- Location in San Luis Obispo County and the state of California

- Location in the United States
- Coordinates: 35°44′15″N 120°52′53″W
- Country: United States
- State: California
- County: San Luis Obispo

Area
  - Total: 10.514 sq mi (27.231 km^{2})
  - Land: 10.491 sq mi (27.172 km^{2})
  - Water: 0.023 sq mi (0.060 km^{2}) 0.22%
- Elevation: 980 ft (300 m)

Population (2020)
  - Total: 2,956
  - Density: 281.8/sq mi (108.8/km^{2})
- Time zone: UTC-8 (Pacific (PST))
  - Summer (DST): UTC-7 (PDT)
- ZIP code: 93446
- Area code: 805
- FIPS code: 06-39670
- GNIS feature ID: 1867034

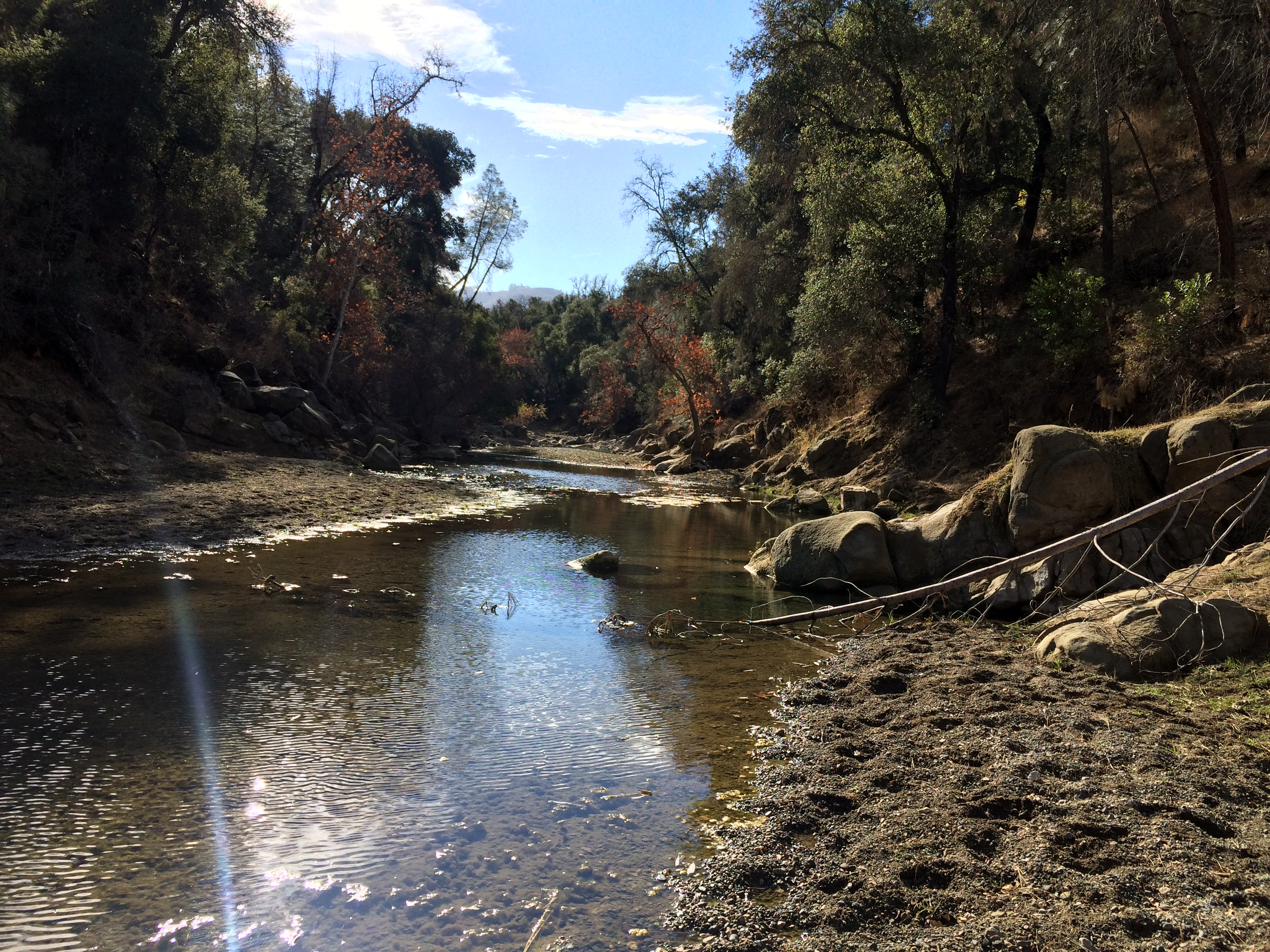
Creek leading into Lake Nacimiento.

Lake Nacimiento is a census-designated place (CDP) in northern San Luis Obispo County, California, United States.

The population of Lake Nacimiento was 2,956 at the 2020 census, up from 2,411 at the 2010 census.

== Geography ==
The community of Lake Nacimiento is located at Lake Nacimiento reservoir, in the Santa Lucia Mountains, at 35°44′15″N 120°52′53″W (35.737585, -120.881328).

According to the United States Census Bureau, the CDP has a total area of 10.5 square miles (27 km^{2}), of which 99.78% is land and 0.22% is water. The lake is often referred to as https://www.google.com/maps/place/Lake+Nacimiento,+CA/@35.7454936,-120.9545829,13z/data=!4m2!3m1!1s0x80ecd5469fc27b79:0x1e4757ac04ae7d5 Dragon Lake], due to its unusual but distinct shape.

=== Climate ===
The Köppen Climate Classification subtype for this climate is "Csb" (Mediterranean Climate).

Climate data for Lake Nacimiento, California
Month	Jan	Feb	Mar	Apr	May	Jun	Jul	Aug	Sep	Oct	Nov	Dec	Year
Mean daily maximum °F (°C)	61 (16)	64 (18)	67 (19)	72 (22)	80 (27)	89 (32)	97 (36)	97 (36)	91 (33)	81 (27)	69 (21)	62 (17)	77 (25)
Mean daily minimum °F (°C)	35 (2)	38 (3)	39 (4)	40 (4)	44 (7)	49 (9)	51 (11)	52 (11)	50 (10)	45 (7)	40 (4)	35 (2)	43 (6)
Average precipitation inches (mm)	3.2 (81)	2.9 (74)	2.2 (56)	1.2 (30)	0.2 (5.1)	0 (0)	0 (0)	0.1 (2.5)	0.2 (5.1)	0.6 (15)	2 (51)	2.4 (61)	15 (380)
Source: Weatherbase

== Demographics ==
Historical population
Census	Pop.	Note	%±
1990	1,556		—
2000	2,176		39.8%
2010	2,411		10.8%
2020	2,956		22.6%
U.S. Decennial Census; 1990 2000 2010

Lake Nacimiento first appeared as a census designated place in the 1990 U.S. census.

=== 2020 census ===
As of the 2020 census, Lake Nacimiento had a population of 2,956. The population density was 281.8 inhabitants per square mile (108.8/km^{2}). The median age was 46.2 years. 20.5% of residents were under the age of 18 and 21.7% were 65 years of age or older. For every 100 females, there were 110.7 males, and for every 100 females age 18 and over, there were 109.6 males.

The Census reported that the whole population lived in households. There were 1,192 households, of which 23.3% had children under the age of 18 living in them. Of all households, 55.7% were married-couple households, 9.6% were cohabiting couple households, 18.0% were households with a male householder and no spouse or partner present, and 16.7% were households with a female householder and no spouse or partner present. About 22.1% of all households were made up of individuals and 11.2% had someone living alone who was 65 years of age or older. The average household size was 2.48. There were 837 families (70.2% of all households).

There were 1,773 housing units, of which 32.8% were vacant. Of the occupied housing units, 81.1% were owner-occupied and 18.9% were occupied by renters. The homeowner vacancy rate was 1.9% and the rental vacancy rate was 7.0%.

0.0% of residents lived in urban areas, while 100.0% lived in rural areas.

Racial composition as of the 2020 census
Race	Number	Percent
White	2,408	81.5%
Black or African American	17	0.6%
American Indian and Alaska Native	34	1.2%
Asian	20	0.7%
Native Hawaiian and Other Pacific Islander	6	0.2%
Some other race	167	5.6%
Two or more races	304	10.3%
Hispanic or Latino (of any race)	492	16.6%

=== 2010 census ===
The 2010 United States census reported that Lake Nacimiento had a population of 2,411. The population density was 234.3 inhabitants per square mile (90.5/km^{2}). The racial makeup of Lake Nacimiento was 2,153 (89.3%) White, 12 (0.5%) African American, 44 (1.8%) Native American, 24 (1.0%) Asian, 5 (0.2%) Pacific Islander, 75 (3.1%) from other races, and 98 (4.1%) from two or more races. Hispanic or Latino of any race were 256 persons (10.6%).

The Census reported that 2,411 people (100% of the population) lived in households, 0 (0%) lived in non-institutionalized group quarters, and 0 (0%) were institutionalized.

There were 1,006 households, out of which 272 (27.0%) had children under the age of 18 living in them, 581 (57.8%) were opposite-sex married couples living together, 67 (6.7%) had a female householder with no husband present, 45 (4.5%) had a male householder with no wife present. There were 66 (6.6%) unmarried opposite-sex partnerships, and 11 (1.1%) same-sex married couples or partnerships. 237 households (23.6%) were made up of individuals, and 69 (6.9%) had someone living alone who was 65 years of age or older. The average household size was 2.40. There were 693 families (68.9% of all households); the average family size was 2.83.

The population was spread out, with 489 people (20.3%) under the age of 18, 163 people (6.8%) aged 18 to 24, 549 people (22.8%) aged 25 to 44, 865 people (35.9%) aged 45 to 64, and 345 people (14.3%) who were 65 years of age or older. The median age was 45.1 years. For every 100 females there were 104.0 males. For every 100 females age 18 and over, there were 103.0 males.

There were 1,776 housing units at an average density of 172.6 units per square mile (66.6 units/km^{2}), of which 771 (76.6%) were owner-occupied, and 235 (23.4%) were occupied by renters. The homeowner vacancy rate was 3.8%; the rental vacancy rate was 6.0%. 1,784 people (74.0% of the population) lived in owner-occupied housing units and 627 people (26.0%) lived in rental housing units.

=== Income and poverty ===
In 2023, the US Census Bureau estimated that the median household income was $85,000, and the per capita income was $45,725. About 2.8% of families and 4.9% of the population were below the poverty line.

== Government ==
In the California State Legislature, Lake Nacimiento is in the 17th senatorial district, represented by Democrat John Laird, and in the 30th Assembly district, represented by Democrat Dawn Addis.

In the United States House of Representatives, Lake Nacimiento is in California's 19th congressional district, represented by Democrat Jimmy Panetta.

== Education ==
A portion of Lake Nacimiento is served by the Paso Robles Joint Unified School District for grades PK-12, while the remainder is served by the San Miguel Joint Union Elementary School District and by the Paso Robles district for grades 9-12 only.
