= Whitley Gardens, California =

Whitley Gardens
- census-designated place
- Position in California.
- Coordinates: 35°39′27″N 120°30′26″W
- Country: United States
- State: California
- County: San Luis Obispo

Area
  - Total: 1.323 sq mi (3.426 km^{2})
  - Land: 1.312 sq mi (3.397 km^{2})
  - Water: 0.011 sq mi (0.029 km^{2}) 0.84%
- Elevation: 896 ft (273 m)

Population (2020)
  - Total: 325
  - Density: 248/sq mi (95.7/km^{2})
- Time zone: UTC-8 (Pacific (PST))
  - Summer (DST): UTC-7 (PDT)
- GNIS feature ID: 2583185

Whitley Gardens is a census-designated place in San Luis Obispo County, California, United States. Whitley Gardens sits at an elevation of 896 feet (273 m). The 2020 United States census reported Whitley Gardens's population as 325.

== Geography ==
According to the United States Census Bureau, the CDP covers an area of 1.3 square miles (3.4 km^{2}), 99.16% of it land and 0.84% of it water. Whitley Gardens is located on the Estrella River.

== Demographics ==
Historical population
Census	Pop.	Note	%±
2010	285		—
2020	325		14.0%
U.S. Decennial Census; 1850–1870 1880-1890; 1900 1910 1920; 1930 1940 1950; 1960 1970 1980; 1990 2000 2010

Whitley Gardens first appeared as a census designated place in the 2010 U.S. census.

The 2020 United States census reported that Whitley Gardens had a population of 325, all of whom lived in households. The population density was 236.0 inhabitants per square mile (91.1/km^{2}). The racial makeup was 220 (67.7%) White, 5 (1.5%) African American, 12 (3.7%) Native American, 0 (0.0%) Asian, 0 (0.0%) Pacific Islander, 19 (5.8%) from other races, and 69 (21.2%) from two or more races. Hispanic or Latino of any race were 86 persons (26.5%).

There were 122 households, out of which 45 (36.9%) had children under the age of 18 living in them, 85 (69.7%) were married-couple households, 3 (2.5%) were cohabiting couple households, 14 (11.5%) had a female householder with no partner present, and 20 (16.4%) had a male householder with no partner present. 19 households (15.6%) were one person, and 13 (10.7%) were one person aged 65 or older. The average household size was 2.66. There were 98 families (80.3% of all households).

The age distribution was 72 people (22.2%) under the age of 18, 19 people (5.8%) aged 18 to 24, 59 people (18.2%) aged 25 to 44, 113 people (34.8%) aged 45 to 64, and 62 people (19.1%) who were 65 years of age or older. The median age was 46.9 years. For every 100 females, there were 72.9 males.

There were 126 housing units at an average density of 91.5 units per square mile (35.3 units/km^{2}), of which 122 (96.8%) were occupied. Of these, 106 (86.9%) were owner-occupied, and 16 (13.1%) were occupied by renters.

== Education ==
It is in the Paso Robles Joint Unified School District for grades PK-12.
