= Callender, California =

Census-designated place in California

Callender
- Unincorporated community Census-designated place
- Location in San Luis Obispo County, California

- Location in California
- Coordinates: 35.053032°N 120.596282°W
- Country: United States
- State: California
- County: San Luis Obispo

Area
  - Total: 2.29 sq mi (5.92 km^{2})
  - Land: 2.29 sq mi (5.92 km^{2})
  - Water: 0 sq mi (0 km^{2})
- Elevation: 102 ft (31 m)

Population (2020)
  - Total: 1,282
  - Density: 561/sq mi (216.5/km^{2})
- Time zone: UTC-8 (Pacific (PST))
  - Summer (DST): UTC-7 (PDT)
- Area codes: 805/820
- FIPS code: 06-09948
- GNIS feature IDs: 252865 (settlement); 2582956 (CDP)

Callender is an unincorporated community in San Luis Obispo County, California, United States. Its population was 1,282 at the 2020 census, compared with 1,262 in 2010. It lies along State Route 1, south of Arroyo Grande.

The surrounding coastal region is part of the Northern Chumash homeland.

== History ==
The nearby Oceano dunes are part of the ancestral homeland of the Northern Chumash, also known as the Obispeño. Coastal and inland communities exchanged shell beads and stone used for tools through regional trading networks. Archaeological investigations on the surrounding Nipomo Mesa have documented camps and settlements along the bluffs and dunes, near springs, and along Black Lake Canyon.

The yak titʸu titʸu yak tiłhini Northern Chumash Tribe describes European disease, the Spanish mission system, the Mexican conquest and American colonization as forces that brought the tribe close to destruction. Northern Chumash descendants continue to live in the region and maintain cultural and linguistic traditions. The tribe supports language development, cultural education, and the stewardship of ancestral lands.

== Geography ==
The Census Bureau's 2020 gazetteer gives the Callender CDP an area of 2.286 square miles (5.92 km^{2}), all land. The U.S. Geological Survey's populated-place record lists Callender's elevation as 102 feet (31 m).

The county's South County Villages Plan, adopted in 2014, describes the Callender–Garrett planning area as a semi-rural settlement on the Nipomo Mesa. It identifies the area south of State Route 1 as the Garrett Tract and describes a mixture of residential, agricultural, and undeveloped land between Callender Road and Black Lake Canyon.

== Demographics ==
Historical population
Census	Pop.	Note	%±
2010	1,262		—
2020	1,282		1.6%
U.S. Census Bureau

Callender was first listed as a CDP in the 2010 census.

At the 2020 census, Callender had 1,282 residents. Of these, 1,266 (98.8%) lived in households and 16 (1.2%) in noninstitutional group quarters. The median age was 46.1 years; 255 residents (19.9%) were under 18 and 298 (23.2%) were aged 65 or older.

Racial composition, 2020 census
Race	Population	Percentage
White	864	67.4%
Black or African American	10	0.8%
American Indian and Alaska Native	24	1.9%
Asian	37	2.9%
Native Hawaiian and other Pacific Islander	0	0.0%
Some other race	106	8.3%
Two or more races	241	18.8%

Hispanic or Latino residents, who may be of any race, numbered 392 (30.6%).

There were 449 households, including 244 married-couple households and 39 cohabiting-couple households. Of all households, 127 (28.3%) included someone under 18, and 93 (20.7%) consisted of one person.

The CDP contained 490 housing units, of which 449 were occupied and 41 vacant. Of the occupied units, 291 (64.8%) were owner-occupied and 158 (35.2%) were rented.

== Education ==
Callender is served by the Lucia Mar Unified School District.
