= San Luis Obispo County Office of Education =

School district in California, United States

Location
- 3350 Education Drive; San Luis Obispo, California 93405 San Luis Obispo County United States

District information
- Grades: PreK–12 and adult education
- Superintendent: Dr. James J. Brescia, Ed. D.
- Schools: Special Education, Community School, Juvenile Court School

Other information
- Website: www.slocoe.org

San Luis Obispo County Office of Education is a public school district in San Luis Obispo County, California, United States.
