= Garden Farms, California =

Garden Farms
- census-designated place
- Location of Garden Farms in San Luis Obispo County, California.

- Position in California.
- Coordinates: 35°24′57″N 120°36′51″W
- Country: United States
- State: California
- County: San Luis Obispo

Area
  - Total: 1.093 sq mi (2.832 km^{2})
  - Land: 1.093 sq mi (2.832 km^{2})
  - Water: 0 sq mi (0 km^{2}) 0%
- Elevation: 955 ft (291 m)

Population (2020)
  - Total: 449
  - Density: 411/sq mi (159/km^{2})
- Time zone: UTC-8 (Pacific (PST))
  - Summer (DST): UTC-7 (PDT)
- GNIS feature ID: 2583022

Garden Farms is a census-designated place in San Luis Obispo County, California, United States. Garden Farms sits at an elevation of 955 feet (291 m). The 2020 United States census reported Garden Farms' population as 449.

Garden Farms is a subdivision located between Santa Margarita and Atascadero.

== Geography ==
According to the United States Census Bureau, the CDP covers an area of 1.1 square miles (2.8 km^{2}), all land.

== History ==
Garden Farms was developed in 1918 on land purchased from Rancho Santa Margarita by Edward Gardner Lewis, who planned the farms to supply produce to Atascadero. The recession after World War I intervened, and the plan failed.

== Demographics ==
Historical population
Census	Pop.	Note	%±
2010	386		—
2020	449		16.3%
U.S. Decennial Census; 1850–1870 1880-1890; 1900 1910 1920; 1930 1940 1950; 1960 1970 1980; 1990 2000 2010

Garden Farms first appeared as a census designated place in the 2010 U.S. census.

The 2020 United States census reported that Garden Farms had a population of 449. The population density was 410.8 inhabitants per square mile (158.6/km^{2}). The racial makeup of Garden Farms was 381 (84.9%) White, 0 (0.0%) African American, 8 (1.8%) Native American, 0 (0.0%) Asian, 1 (0.2%) Pacific Islander, 20 (4.5%) from other races, and 39 (8.7%) from two or more races. Hispanic or Latino of any race were 58 persons (12.9%).

The whole population lived in households. There were 174 households, out of which 49 (28.2%) had children under the age of 18 living in them, 81 (46.6%) were married-couple households, 10 (5.7%) were cohabiting couple households, 54 (31.0%) had a female householder with no partner present, and 29 (16.7%) had a male householder with no partner present. 58 households (33.3%) were one person, and 18 (10.3%) were one person aged 65 or older. The average household size was 2.58. There were 105 families (60.3% of all households).

The age distribution was 98 people (21.8%) under the age of 18, 16 people (3.6%) aged 18 to 24, 99 people (22.0%) aged 25 to 44, 113 people (25.2%) aged 45 to 64, and 123 people (27.4%) who were 65 years of age or older. The median age was 48.3 years. For every 100 females, there were 96.9 males.

There were 182 housing units at an average density of 166.5 units per square mile (64.3 units/km^{2}), of which 174 (95.6%) were occupied. Of these, 116 (66.7%) were owner-occupied, and 58 (33.3%) were occupied by renters.
