= Blacklake, California =

Census-designated place in California

- Unincorporated community Census-designated place
- Location in San Luis Obispo County, California

- Location in California
- Coordinates: 35.049689°N 120.538642°W
- Country: United States
- State: California
- County: San Luis Obispo

Area
  - Total: 1.05 sq mi (2.71 km^{2})
  - Land: 1.05 sq mi (2.71 km^{2})
  - Water: 0 sq mi (0 km^{2})
- Elevation: 341 ft (104 m)

Population (2020)
  - Total: 1,016
  - Density: 972/sq mi (375.2/km^{2})
- Time zone: UTC-8 (Pacific (PST))
  - Summer (DST): UTC-7 (PDT)
- FIPS code: 06-06935
- GNIS feature ID: 2582945

Blacklake is an unincorporated community in San Luis Obispo County, California, United States. For statistical purposes, the United States Census Bureau has defined Blacklake as a census-designated place (CDP). Its population was 1,016 at the 2020 census, up from 930 in 2010. The community lies on the Nipomo Mesa and includes residential development around the Blacklake golf course.

== History ==
The Nipomo Mesa lies within the ancestral homeland of the Northern Chumash, also known as the Obispeño, who have lived in the region for more than 10,000 years and who traded shell beads and fine-grained tool stone between coastal and interior villages. Archaeological survey of the mesa has recorded prehistoric camps and villages along the tops of the bluffs and the older dunes, with further sites inland near springs and along Black Lake Canyon, where large, low-density settlements have been documented.

The San Luis Obispo County Board of Supervisors adopted the Black Lake Specific Plan on February 28, 1983. The plan provided for residential and recreational development centered on the golf course.

In December 2025, the Board of Supervisors voted to allow an application for a plan amendment proposing 125 additional units, including homes, lodging, and short-term rental accommodations. The vote authorized the application process; it did not grant final approval for construction.

== Geography ==
Blacklake is on the Nipomo Mesa, west of U.S. Route 101 and north of Nipomo. The Census Bureau's 2020 gazetteer lists the CDP's area as 1.045 square miles (2.71 km^{2}), all land. The U.S. Geological Survey lists its elevation as 341 feet (104 m).

== Demographics ==
Historical population
Census	Pop.	Note	%±
2010	930		—
2020	1,016		9.2%
U.S. Census Bureau

Blacklake was first listed as a CDP in the 2010 census.

At the 2020 census, Blacklake had 1,016 residents, all living in households. The median age was 67.8 years; 609 residents (59.9%) were aged 65 or older.

Racial composition, 2020 census
Race	Population	Percentage
White	859	84.5%
Black or African American	6	0.6%
American Indian and Alaska Native	4	0.4%
Asian	31	3.1%
Native Hawaiian and other Pacific Islander	1	0.1%
Some other race	14	1.4%
Two or more races	101	9.9%

Hispanic or Latino residents, who may be of any race, numbered 103 (10.1%).

There were 531 households, including 324 married-couple households and 19 cohabiting-couple households. Of all households, 56 (10.5%) included someone under 18, and 138 (26.0%) consisted of one person.

The CDP contained 627 housing units: 531 occupied and 96 vacant. Of the occupied units, 432 (81.4%) were owner-occupied and 99 (18.6%) were rented.

== Education ==
Blacklake is served by the Lucia Mar Unified School District.
