= Los Ranchos, California =

Los Ranchos
- census-designated place
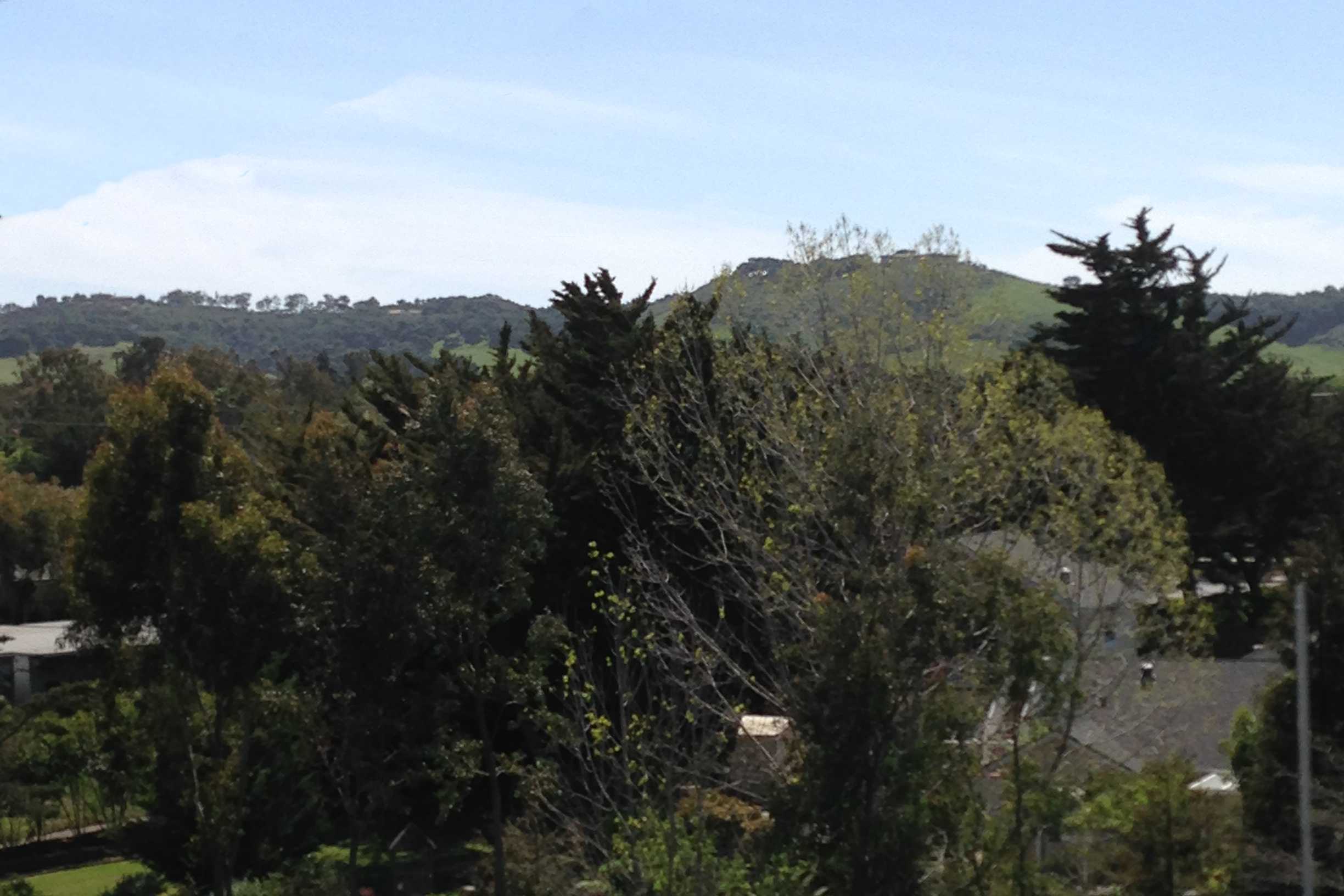
- Los Ranchos

- Position in California.
- Coordinates: 35°12′43″N 120°37′46″W
- Country: United States
- State: California
- County: San Luis Obispo

Area
  - Total: 2.892 sq mi (7.491 km^{2})
  - Land: 2.889 sq mi (7.482 km^{2})
  - Water: 0.0035 sq mi (0.009 km^{2}) 0.12%
- Elevation: 256 ft (78 m)

Population (2020)
  - Total: 1,516
  - Density: 524.8/sq mi (202.6/km^{2})
- Time zone: UTC-8 (Pacific (PST))
  - Summer (DST): UTC-7 (PDT)
- GNIS feature ID: 2583065

Los Ranchos is a census-designated place in San Luis Obispo County, California, United States. Los Ranchos sits at an elevation of 256 feet (78 m). The 2020 United States census reported Los Ranchos' population as 1,516.

Los Ranchos is an area of residential subdivisions surrounding the San Luis Obispo Country Club. It is located between the San Luis Obispo County Regional Airport and Edna.

== Geography ==
According to the United States Census Bureau, the CDP covers an area of 2.9 square miles (7.5 km^{2}), of which 99.88% is land and 0.12% is water.

== Demographics ==
Historical population
Census	Pop.	Note	%±
2010	1,477		—
2020	1,516		2.6%
U.S. Decennial Census; 1850–1870 1880-1890; 1900 1910 1920; 1930 1940 1950; 1960 1970 1980; 1990 2000 2010

Los Ranchos first appeared as a census designated place in the 2010 U.S. census.

=== 2020 census ===
As of the 2020 census, Los Ranchos had a population of 1,516. The population density was 524.7 inhabitants per square mile (202.6/km^{2}). The median age was 53.6 years. For every 100 females there were 93.6 males, and for every 100 females age 18 and over there were 89.0 males age 18 and over.

88.9% of residents lived in urban areas, while 11.1% lived in rural areas.

The whole population lived in households. There were 599 households, out of which 152 (25.4%) had children under the age of 18 living in them. Of all households, 424 (70.8%) were married-couple households, 20 (3.3%) were cohabiting couple households, 101 (16.9%) had a female householder with no spouse or partner present, and 54 (9.0%) had a male householder with no spouse or partner present. About 105 households (17.5%) were one person, and 72 (12.0%) were one person aged 65 or older. The average household size was 2.53. There were 466 families (77.8% of all households).

There were 630 housing units at an average density of 218.1 units per square mile (84.2 units/km^{2}), of which 599 (95.1%) were occupied. Of these, 538 (89.8%) were owner-occupied and 61 (10.2%) were occupied by renters. The vacancy rate was 4.9%; the homeowner vacancy rate was 0.2% and the rental vacancy rate was 0.0%.

The age distribution was 299 people (19.7%) under the age of 18, 90 people (5.9%) aged 18 to 24, 214 people (14.1%) aged 25 to 44, 417 people (27.5%) aged 45 to 64, and 496 people (32.7%) who were 65 years of age or older.

Racial composition as of the 2020 census
Race	Number	Percent
White	1,299	85.7%
Black or African American	0	0.0%
American Indian and Alaska Native	7	0.5%
Asian	38	2.5%
Native Hawaiian and Other Pacific Islander	0	0.0%
Some other race	23	1.5%
Two or more races	149	9.8%
Hispanic or Latino (of any race)	125	8.2%

== Education ==
Los Ranchos is served by the San Luis Coastal Unified School District.
