= San Luis Obispo County, California =

County in California, United States

San Luis Obispo County
- County
- County of San Luis Obispo
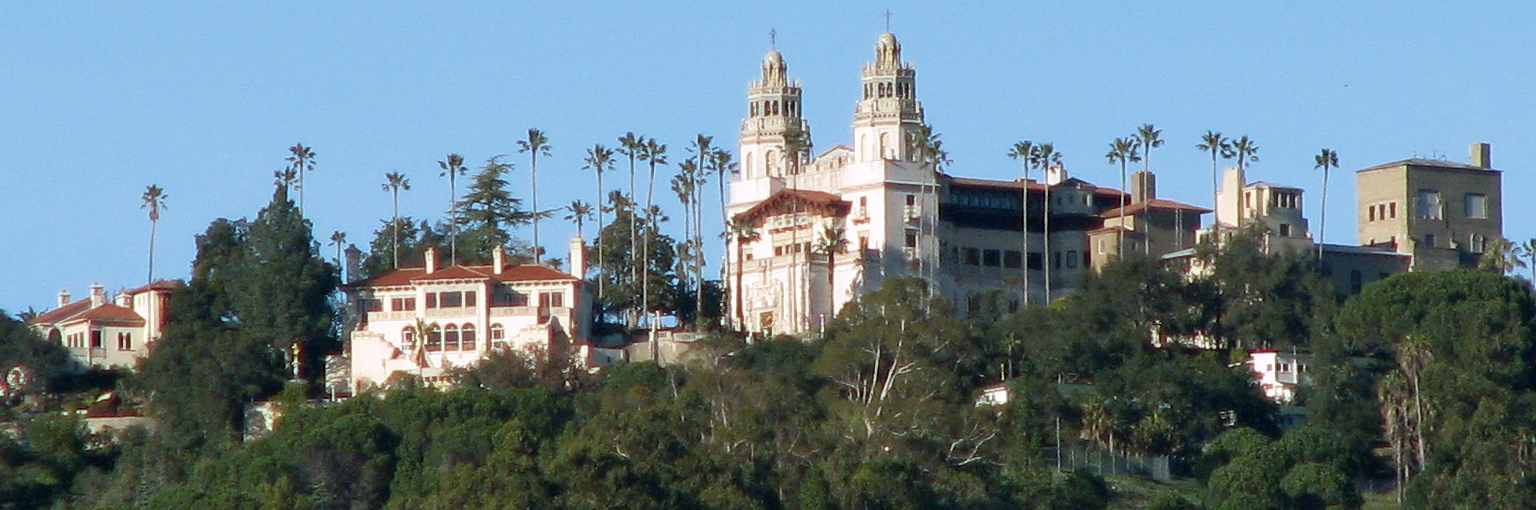
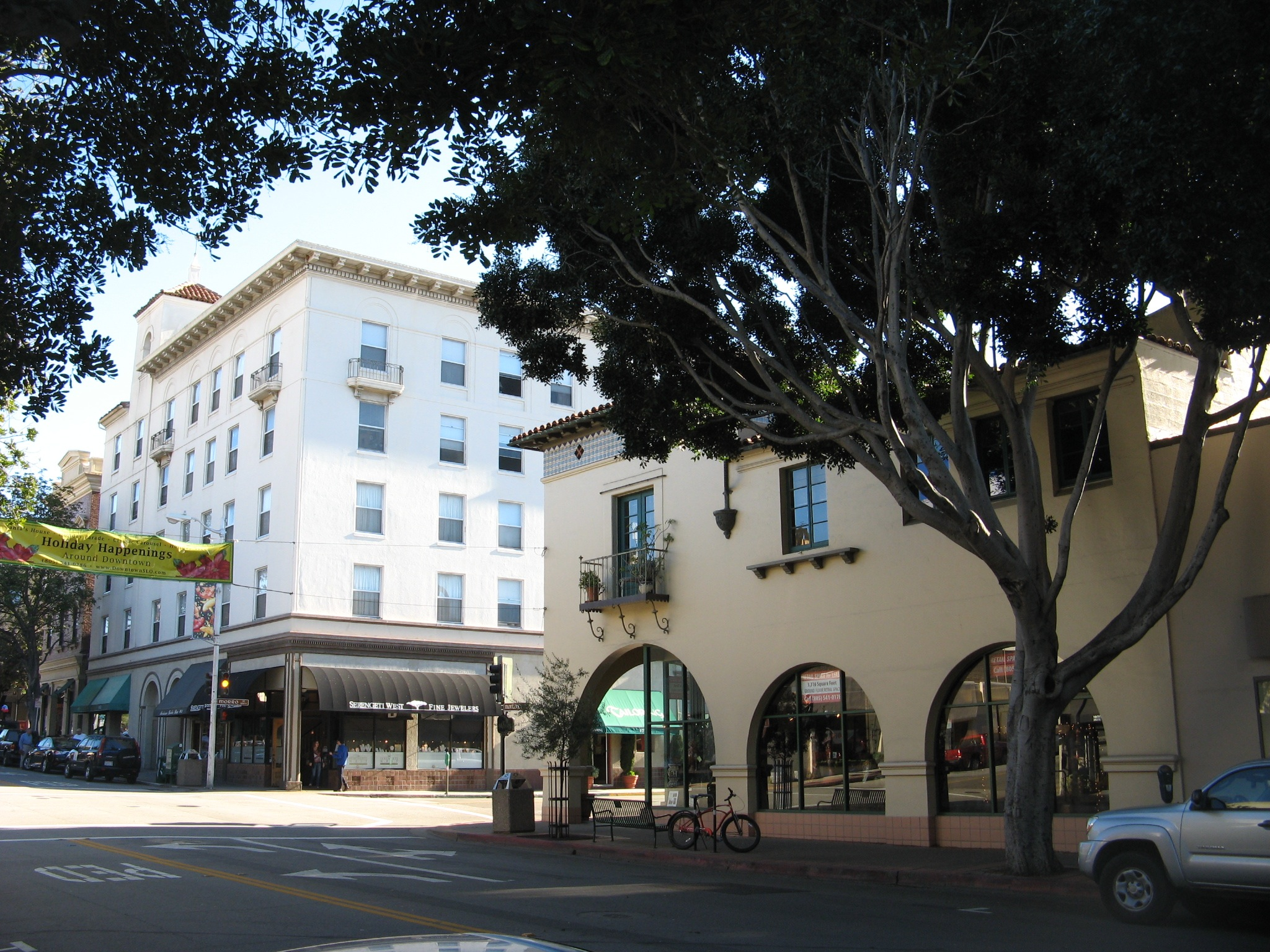
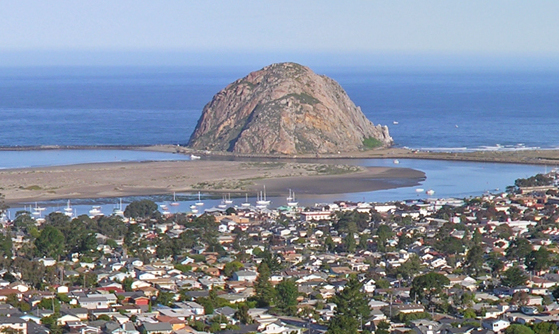
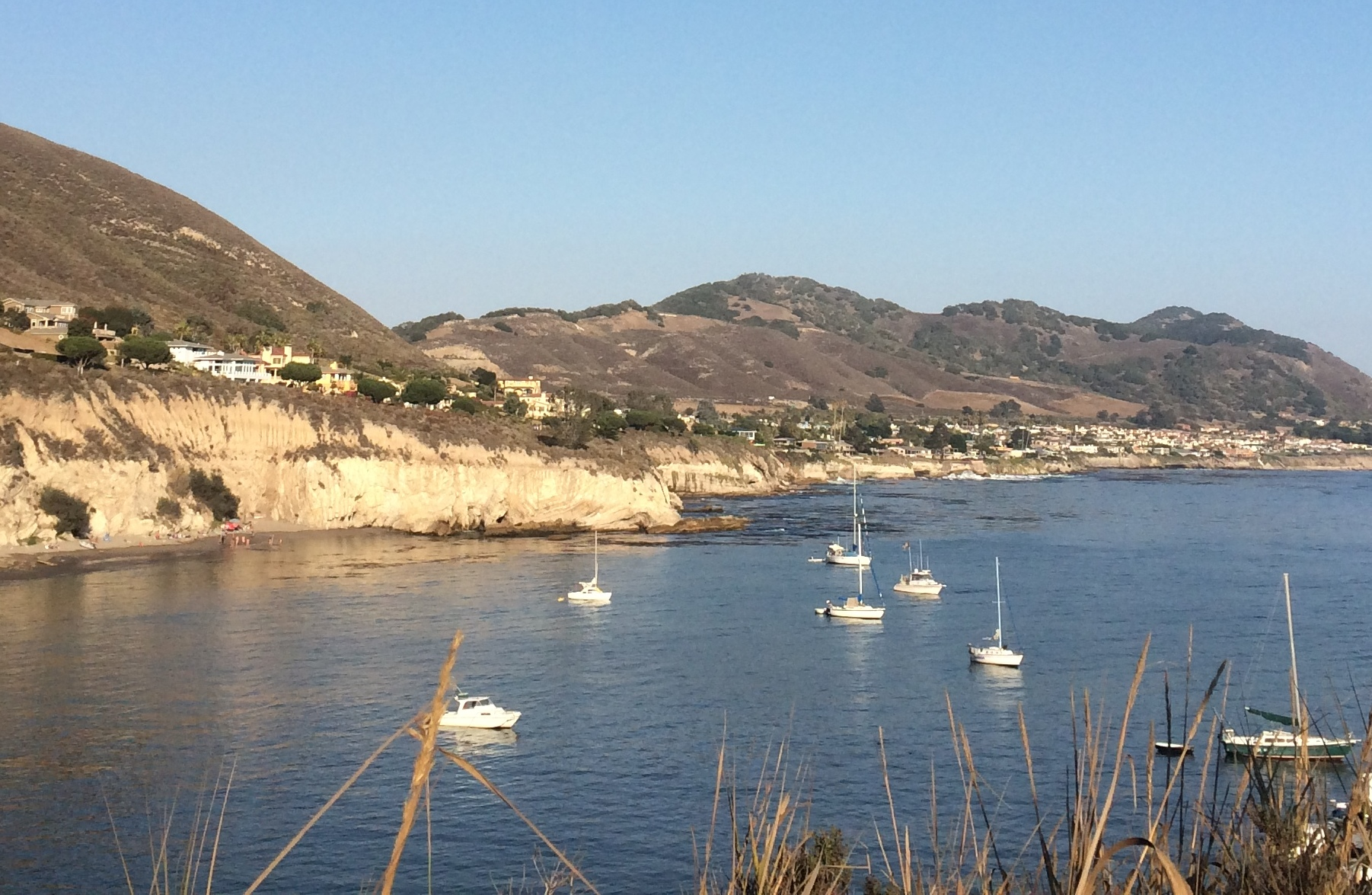
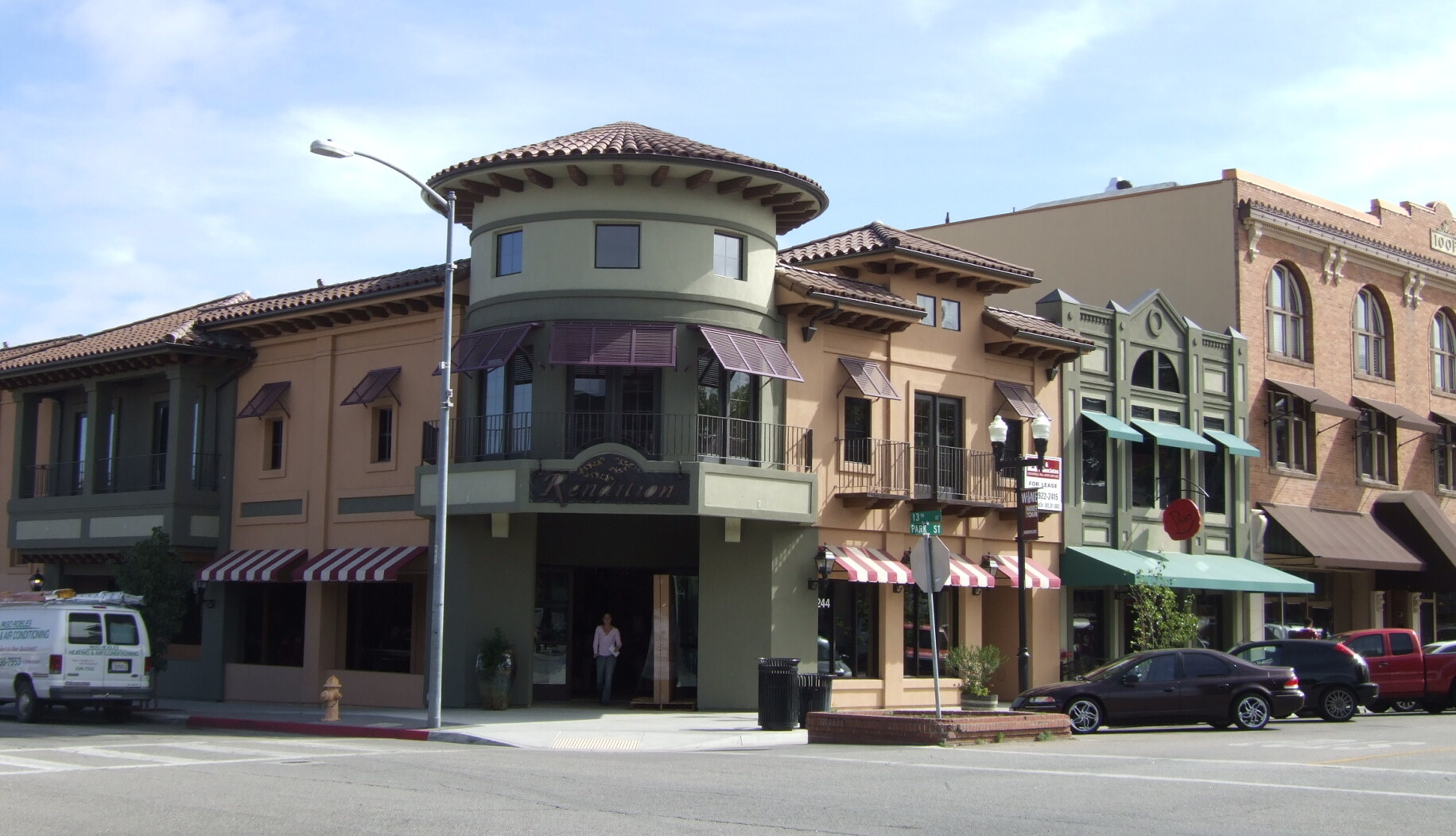
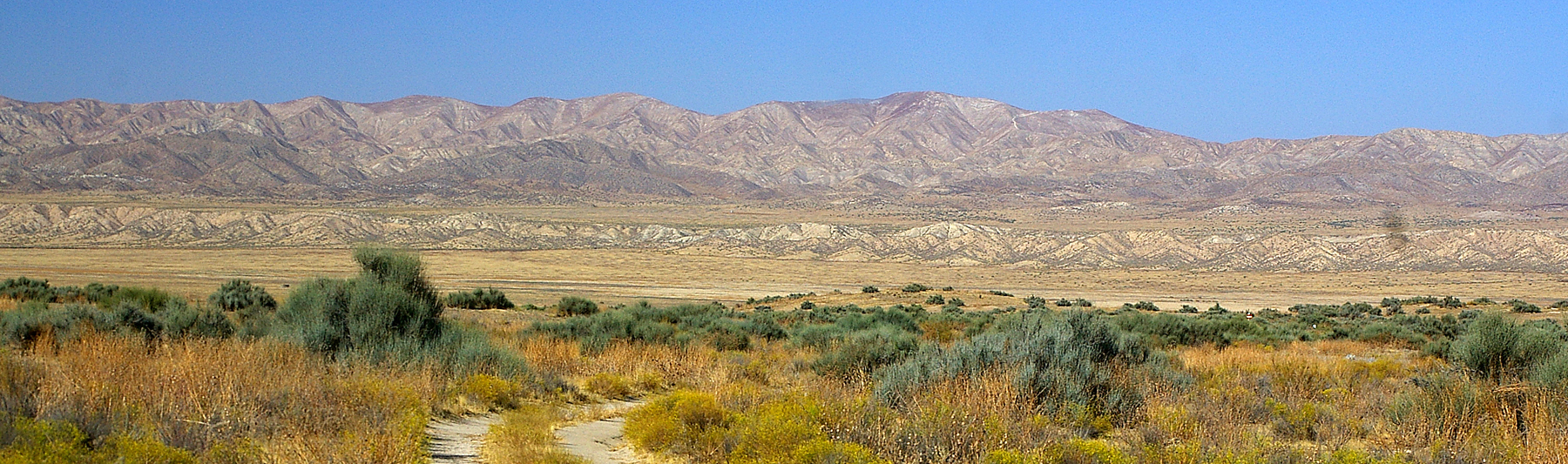
- Hearst Castle in San Simeon San Luis Obispo Morro Bay Avila Beach Paso Robles Caliente Range from Carrizo Plain

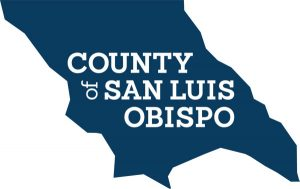
- Flag Seal Logo
- Motto: "Not For Ourselves Alone"
- Interactive map of San Luis Obispo County
- Location in the state of California
- Coordinates: 35.39°N 120.45°W
- Country: United States
- State: California
- Region: California Central Coast
- Formed: February 18, 1850
- Named for: Saint Louis, Bishop of Toulouse
- County seat: San Luis Obispo
- Largest city (population): San Luis Obispo
- Largest city (area): Atascadero

Government
  - Type: General-law county
  - Body: San Luis Obispo County Board of Supervisors
  - Chair: Jimmy Paulding
  - Vice chair: Bruce Gibson
  - Supervisors: List: John Peschong, District 1; Bruce Gibson, District 2; Dawn Ortiz-Legg, District 3; Jimmy Paulding, District 4; Heather Moreno, District 5
  - Chief executive officer: Matt Pontes

Area
  - Total: 3,616 sq mi (9,370 km^{2})
  - Land: 3,301 sq mi (8,550 km^{2})
  - Water: 315 sq mi (820 km^{2}) 8.7%
- 2020 Census Gazetteer
- Highest elevation: 5,106 ft (1,556 m)

Population (2020)
  - Total: 282,424
  - Estimate (2025): 282,367
  - Density: 85.56/sq mi (33.03/km^{2})

GDP
  - Total: $24.505 billion (2024)
- Time zone: UTC-08:00 (PST)
  - Summer (DST): UTC-07:00 (PDT)
- Area codes: 805 and 820
- FIPS code: 06079
- Congressional districts: 19th, 24th
- Website: www.slocounty.ca.gov

San Luis Obispo County (/sæn ˌluːɪs oʊˈbɪspoʊ/ san-lu-is-o-bis-po), officially the County of San Luis Obispo, is a county on the Central Coast of California. Its population was 282,424 at the 2020 census, and the U.S. Census Bureau estimated 282,367 residents on July 1, 2025. San Luis Obispo is the county seat and its largest city by population. The county has 3,301 square miles (8,550 km^{2}) of land, extending from the Pacific coast across the Santa Lucia Range to inland valleys and the Caliente Range.

The county was established in 1850. Its history includes Chumash and Salinan communities, Spanish missions, Mexican ranchos, and the development of agriculture, railroads, and coastal shipping. Cal Poly opened in 1903, and military training installations expanded during World War II.

Service industries account for most employment, including government, education and health care, and leisure and hospitality. Agriculture includes strawberries and wine grapes, the county’s two highest-value crops in 2024. The county is also home to Hearst Castle and Diablo Canyon Power Plant.

== History ==
=== Indigenous history ===
Archaeological evidence documents thousands of years of coastal occupation in what is now San Luis Obispo County. Excavations around Morro Bay have identified fishing communities dating to the Millingstone Horizon. Chumash communities lived around Morro Bay and Los Osos, while Salinan communities inhabited the vicinity of present-day San Miguel.

Historical accounts disagree about the boundary between Northern Chumash and Salinan languages along the northern coast of the county. Mission registers and later ethnographic records leave the locations and linguistic affiliations of many villages uncertain.

The Yak titʸu titʸu yak tiłhini Northern Chumash Tribe and the Salinan Tribe continue cultural preservation work in the region.

=== Spanish missions and Mexican ranchos ===
Junípero Serra founded Mission San Luis Obispo de Tolosa on September 1, 1772. Mission San Miguel Arcángel followed on July 25, 1797, founded by Fermín Lasuén. Spanish missions depended on Indigenous agricultural and ranching labor. Introduced diseases reduced Chumash populations, while livestock grazing depleted traditional plant foods and colonial authorities suppressed Indigenous burning. In 1803, the viceroy of New Spain ordered baptized Indigenous people to leave their villages and reside at the missions.

Mexican secularization began in 1834. Regulations provided for distributing land and livestock to Indigenous mission residents, but much of the property instead passed into private ranchos. In 1839, Indigenous residents of Mission San Luis Obispo sought to retain Corral de Piedra, where they kept cattle. Governor Juan Bautista Alvarado granted the ranch and its cattle to José María Villavicencio in 1840. Rancho San Miguelito, granted to Miguel Ávila in 1842, included the future Diablo Canyon site.

Between 1837 and 1843, some Salinan, Northern Chumash, and Yokuts families remained near the former missions, while others became ranch workers. In 1844, Governor Manuel Micheltorena granted land at Las Gallinas, El Nacimiento, and La Estrella to Indigenous residents of San Miguel. U.S. courts later rejected those grants on the grounds that required improvements had not been made.

=== County formation and transportation ===
Mexico ceded California to the United States under the 1848 Treaty of Guadalupe Hidalgo, which ended the Mexican–American War. San Luis Obispo County was one of California’s original counties, established in 1850.

The federal Land Act of 1851 required holders of Spanish and Mexican land grants to submit claims to a land commission. Claimants bore the costs of litigation and surveys, and confirmation could take decades. Rancho San Miguelito received its U.S. patent in 1877.

Cattle ranching and farming dominated the nineteenth-century economy. The drought of 1862–1864 forced the sale of many cattle ranches and encouraged a shift toward dairying.

Coastal wharves and steamship service connected farms to outside markets. Chinese immigrants worked on railroads, roads, and wharves. Southern Pacific reached San Miguel and Paso Robles in 1886 and San Luis Obispo in 1894; completion of the coastal line in 1901 connected the county by rail to both San Francisco and Los Angeles.

=== Early twentieth century and World War II ===
The California Polytechnic School, now Cal Poly, was established by state legislation in 1901 and opened in 1903, initially teaching agriculture, engineering, and household arts.

Oil storage and shipping developed at Port San Luis as production expanded in the neighboring Santa Maria fields. In 1906, Union Oil connected those fields to a storage facility at the port by pipeline.

William Randolph Hearst and architect Julia Morgan developed Hearst Castle above San Simeon between 1919 and 1947. The estate was given to the state in 1958.

Japanese immigrant farmers cultivated vegetables and flower seeds during the early twentieth century. In 1942, Japanese Americans in the county were forcibly removed to incarceration camps; some returned after the war, while others did not.

Camp San Luis Obispo, established in 1927, expanded during World War II. Camp Roberts began training troops in March 1941.

=== Postwar growth and environmental disputes ===
After World War II, veterans who had trained locally settled in the county, and educational opportunities at Cal Poly attracted others. Housing demand led to the conversion of farmland around existing towns into residential subdivisions.

From the 1970s, agriculture shifted toward wine grapes, vegetables, fruit, and seed crops, while service and professional employment expanded.

Construction of Diablo Canyon Power Plant became a focus of environmental opposition during the 1970s and 1980s, including campaigns by San Luis Obispo Mothers for Peace and the Abalone Alliance. The plant’s two reactors began commercial operation in 1985 and 1986. In 1986, voters approved Measure A, requiring voter approval for onshore facilities serving offshore oil development.

== Geography ==
According to the U.S. Census Bureau, the county has a total area of 3,616 square miles (9,370 km^{2}), of which 3,301 square miles (8,550 km^{2}) is land and 315 square miles (820 km^{2}) (comprising 8.7%) is water.

The La Panza, Garcia, and Santa Lucia ranges occupy the central portion of the county, and the Caliente Range lies in the southeast. The Santa Lucia Range extends along much of the western county, rising sharply from the coast in the north. The Irish Hills lie between Los Osos and Avila Beach. Caliente Peak reaches 5,106 feet (1,556 m), the county’s highest elevation.

The Salinas River drains the Paso Robles area and flows north into Monterey County. San Luis Obispo Creek passes through the county seat and reaches the Pacific Ocean beside Avila Beach. In the south, the Santa Maria River watershed spans parts of San Luis Obispo and Santa Barbara counties and includes the Cuyama and Sisquoc rivers.

=== Climate ===
The county has a Mediterranean climate, with most rainfall occurring during the cooler part of the year. Conditions range from a cool, damp northern coast to a hot, dry interior, including the Cuyama Valley. The Garcia and Santa Lucia ranges intercept Pacific rain-bearing clouds and separate coastal marine air from the drier interior during much of summer. Summer fog is common along the coast, while inland valleys experience winter fog.

The San Luis Obispo area has a warm-summer Mediterranean climate (Csb) under the Köppen climate classification. For the 1991–2020 climate-normal period, the mean daily maximum temperature in July was 78.0 °F (25.6 °C) at San Luis Obispo County Regional Airport and 93.2 °F (34.0 °C) at Paso Robles Municipal Airport. The January mean daily minimum temperatures at the same stations were 40.6 °F (4.8 °C) and 35.1 °F (1.7 °C), respectively.

=== Adjacent counties ===
Areas adjacent to San Luis Obispo County, California

=== National protected areas ===
- Carrizo Plain National Monument (part)
- Guadalupe-Nipomo Dunes National Wildlife Refuge
- Los Padres National Forest (part)

=== Marine protected areas ===
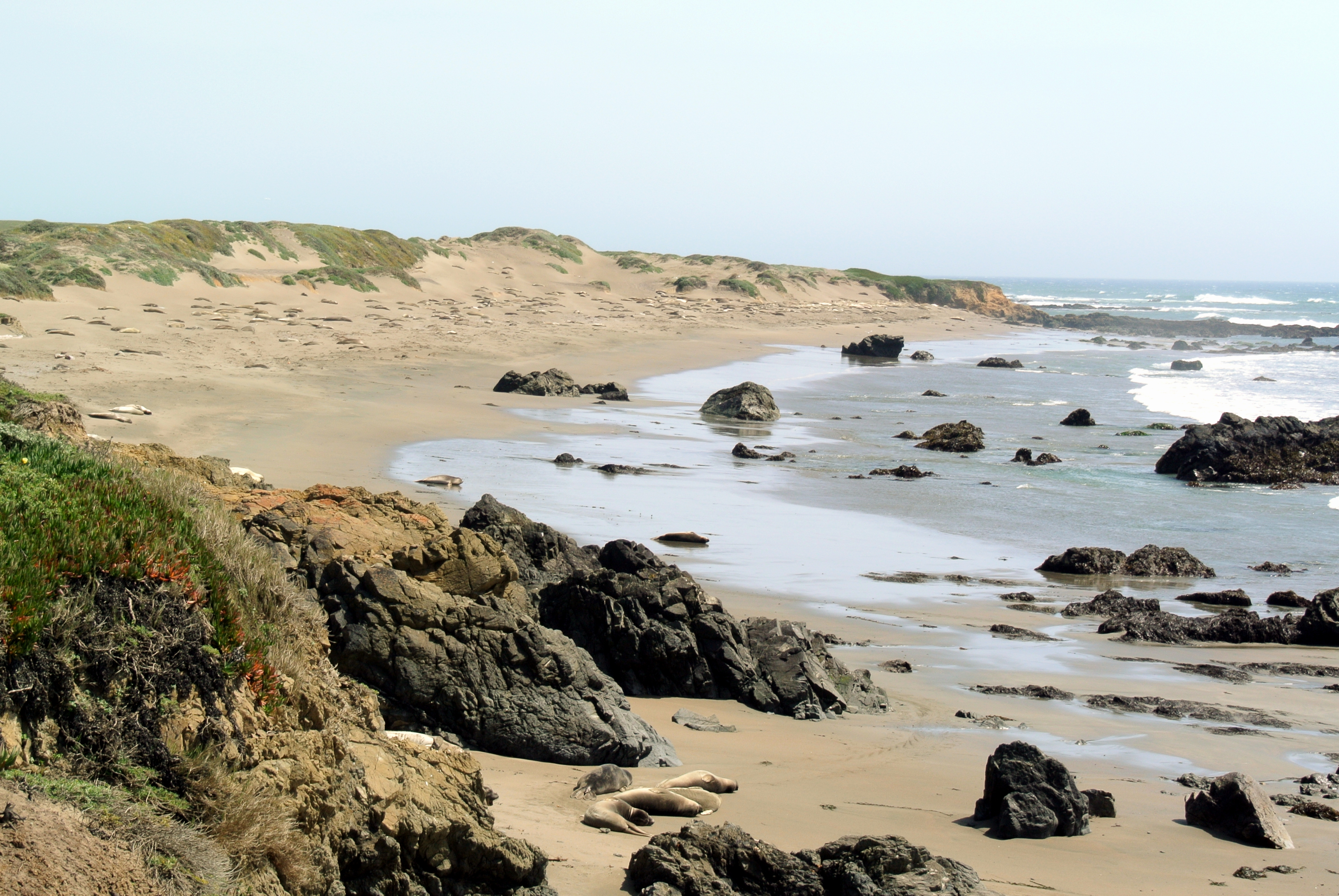
Piedras Blancas State Marine Reserve and Marine Conservation Area, an elephant seal rookery.

- Cambria State Marine Conservation Area and State Marine Park
- Chumash Heritage National Marine Sanctuary
- Monterey Bay National Marine Sanctuary
- Morro Bay State Marine Recreational Management Area and Morro Bay State Marine Reserve
- Piedras Blancas State Marine Reserve and Marine Conservation Area
- Point Buchon State Marine Reserve and Marine Conservation Area
- White Rock (Cambria) State Marine Conservation Area

== Demographics ==
The 2020 census counted 282,424 residents. The U.S. Census Bureau estimated 282,367 residents on July 1, 2025. The California Department of Finance estimated the county's population at 279,242 on January 1, 2026.

Historical population
Census	Pop.	Note	%±
1850	336		—
1860	1,782		430.4%
1870	4,772		167.8%
1880	9,142		91.6%
1890	16,072		75.8%
1900	16,637		3.5%
1910	19,383		16.5%
1920	21,893		12.9%
1930	29,613		35.3%
1940	33,246		12.3%
1950	51,417		54.7%
1960	81,044		57.6%
1970	105,690		30.4%
1980	155,435		47.1%
1990	217,162		39.7%
2000	246,681		13.6%
2010	269,637		9.3%
2020	282,424		4.7%
2025 (est.)	282,367	▼	0.0%
U.S. Decennial Census; 1790–1960 1900–1990; 1990–2000 2010 2020

=== 2020 census ===
As of the 2020 census, the county had a population of 282,424. The median age was 41.4 years. 17.9% of residents were under the age of 18 and 21.7% of residents were 65 years of age or older. For every 100 females there were 98.7 males, and for every 100 females age 18 and over there were 97.2 males age 18 and over.

The racial makeup of the county was 70.2% White, 1.6% Black or African American, 1.1% American Indian and Alaska Native, 3.7% Asian, 0.1% Native Hawaiian and Pacific Islander, 9.7% from some other race, and 13.5% from two or more races. Hispanic or Latino residents of any race comprised 24.0% of the population.

80.9% of residents lived in urban areas, while 19.1% lived in rural areas.

There were 107,797 households in the county, of which 25.7% had children under the age of 18 living with them and 26.6% had a female householder with no spouse or partner present. About 26.6% of all households were made up of individuals and 13.2% had someone living alone who was 65 years of age or older.

There were 123,715 housing units, of which 12.9% were vacant. Among occupied housing units, 61.5% were owner-occupied and 38.5% were renter-occupied. The homeowner vacancy rate was 1.3% and the rental vacancy rate was 4.6%.

=== Racial and ethnic composition ===
San Luis Obispo County, California – Racial and ethnic composition Note: the US Census treats Hispanic/Latino as an ethnic category. This table excludes Latinos from the racial categories and assigns them to a separate category. Hispanics/Latinos may be of any race.
Race / Ethnicity (NH = Non-Hispanic)	Pop 1980	Pop 1990	Pop 2000	Pop 2010	Pop 2020	% 1980	% 1990	% 2000	% 2010	% 2020
White alone (NH)	132,809	176,246	187,840	191,696	183,468	85.44%	81.16%	76.15%	71.09%	64.96%
Black or African American alone (NH)	2,649	4,325	4,743	5,128	4,330	1.70%	1.99%	1.92%	1.90%	1.53%
Native American or Alaska Native alone (NH)	1,786	1,652	1,490	1,367	1,136	1.15%	0.76%	0.60%	0.51%	0.40%
Asian alone (NH)	3,204	5,774	6,342	8,106	10,001	2.06%	2.66%	2.57%	3.01%	3.54%
Native Hawaiian or Pacific Islander alone (NH)	x	x	227	346	340	0.09%	0.13%	0.09%	0.13%	0.12%
Other race alone (NH)	195	242	365	784	1,614	0.13%	0.11%	0.15%	0.29%	0.57%
Mixed race or Multiracial (NH)	x (Note: The census first allowed respondents to identify with more than one race in 2000.)	x	5,478	6,237	13,614	x	x	2.22%	2.31%	4.82%
Hispanic or Latino (any race)	14,792	28,923	40,196	55,973	67,921	9.52%	13.32%	16.29%	20.76%	24.05%
Total	155,435	217,162	246,681	269,637	282,424	100.00%	100.00%	100.00%	100.00%	100.00%

=== American Community Survey 2025 data ===
The United States Census Bureau estimated that in 2025, San Luis Obispo County’s population was 282.367. It was also estimated that the county's population was 63,32% Non-Hispanic White, 26,36% Hispanic or Latino, 1,48% Non-Hispanic Black, 4,30% Asian, 0,42% Native American, 0,13% Pacific Islander, and 4,00% Multiracial.

Total	Population	Percentage
Non-Hispanic White	178.791	63,32%
Hispanic or Latino	74.435	26,36%
Non-Hispanic Black	4.179	1,48%
Asian	12.134	4,30%
Native American	1.180	0,42%
Pacific Islander	367	0,13%
Non-Hispanic Multiracial	11.281	4,00%

=== 2010 census ===
The 2010 United States census reported that San Luis Obispo County had a population of 269,637. The racial makeup of San Luis Obispo County was 222,756 (82.6%) White, 5,550 (2.1%) African American, 2,536 (0.9%) Native American, 8,507 (3.2%) Asian (1.0% Filipino, 0.6% Chinese, 0.4% Japanese, 0.3% Indian, 0.3% Korean, 0.2% Vietnamese), 389 (0.1%) Pacific Islander, 19,786 (7.3%) from other races, and 10,113 (3.8%) from two or more races. Hispanic or Latino of any race were 55,973 persons (20.8%); 17.7% of San Luis Obispo County is Mexican, 0.3% Puerto Rican, and 0.2% Salvadoran.

Population reported at 2010 United States census
The County	Total population	White	African American	Native American	Asian	Pacific Islander	other races	two or more races	Hispanic or Latino (of any race)
San Luis Obispo County	269,637	222,756	5,550	2,536	8,507	389	19,786	10,113	55,973
Incorporated cities	Total population	White	African American	Native American	Asian	Pacific Islander	other races	two or more races	Hispanic or Latino (of any race)
Arroyo Grande	17,252	14,710	156	125	595	14	856	796	2,707
Atascadero	28,310	24,457	585	295	685	57	1,205	1,026	4,429
Grover Beach	13,156	9,964	146	186	542	35	1,582	701	3,840
Morro Bay	10,234	8,909	44	92	258	9	613	309	1,526
Paso Robles	29,793	23,158	622	297	593	56	3,916	1,151	10,275
Pismo Beach	7,655	6,976	50	41	203	11	170	204	715
San Luis Obispo	45,119	38,117	523	275	2,350	65	1,973	1,816	6,626
Census-designated places	Total population	White	African American	Native American	Asian	Pacific Islander	other races	two or more races	Hispanic or Latino (of any race)
Avila Beach	1,627	1,507	13	7	33	0	34	33	111
Blacklake	930	865	8	7	24	0	14	12	70
Callender	1,262	1,003	7	22	48	0	128	54	355
Cambria	6,032	5,166	18	47	78	14	557	152	1,187
Cayucos	2,592	2,366	6	12	54	8	57	89	207
Creston	94	89	0	2	1	0	0	2	6
Edna	193	185	0	3	0	0	5	0	22
Garden Farms	386	348	2	2	5	0	21	8	40
Lake Nacimiento	2,411	2,153	12	44	24	5	75	98	256
Los Berros	641	527	4	1	12	1	45	51	153
Los Osos	14,276	12,304	79	97	748	18	552	478	1,977
Los Ranchos	1,477	1,389	1	2	31	0	18	36	58
Nipomo	16,714	12,281	177	200	421	33	2,821	781	6,645
Oak Shores	337	318	3	2	4	0	4	6	31
Oceano	7,286	5,105	62	120	165	7	1,509	318	3,484
San Miguel	2,336	1,638	65	58	19	1	474	81	1,196
San Simeon	462	270	4	5	9	2	160	12	258
Santa Margarita	1,259	1,077	8	28	34	0	42	70	206
Shandon	1,295	840	34	18	7	2	352	42	693
Templeton	7,674	6,833	59	80	123	10	337	232	1,171
Whitley Gardens	285	260	1	6	1	0	13	4	43
Woodlands	576	541	7	0	18	1	3	6	27
Other unincorporated areas	Total population	White	African American	Native American	Asian	Pacific Islander	other races	two or more races	Hispanic or Latino (of any race)
All others not CDPs (combined)	47,973	39,400	2,854	462	1,422	40	2,250	1,545	7,659

=== 2000 census ===
As of the census of 2000, there were 246,681 residents, 92,739 households, and 58,611 families in the county. The population density was 75 people per square mile (29 people/km^{2}). There were 102,275 housing units at an average density of 31 units per square mile (12 units/km^{2}). The racial makeup of the county was 84.6% White, 2.0% Black or African American, 1.0% Native American, 2.7% Asian, 0.1% Pacific Islander, 6.2% from other races, and 3.4% from two or more races. 16.3% of the population were Hispanic or Latino of any race. 13.9% were of German, 11.4% English, 9.7% Irish, 6.1% American and 5.7% Italian ancestry according to Census 2000. 85.7% spoke English and 10.7% Spanish as their first language.

There were 92,739 households, out of which 28.2% had children under the age of 18 living with them, 50.40% were married couples living together, 9.1% had a female householder with no husband present, and 36.8% were non-families. 26.0% of all households were made up of individuals, and 10.3% had someone living alone who was 65 years of age or older. The average household size was 2.49 and the average family size was 3.01.

In the county, the population was spread out, with 21.7% under the age of 18, 13.6% from 18 to 24, 27.0% from 25 to 44, 23.3% from 45 to 64, and 14.5% who were 65 years of age or older. The median age was 37 years. For every 100 females there were 105.6 males. For every 100 females age 18 and over, there were 105.2 males.

The median income for a household in the county was $42,428, and the median income for a family was $52,447. Males had a median income of $40,726 versus $27,450 for females. The per capita income for the county was $21,864. About 6.8% of families and 12.8% of the population were below the poverty line, including 11.4% of those under age 18 and 5.9% of those age 65 or over.

== Economy ==
The county’s gross domestic product was $24.505 billion in 2024. Preliminary Employment Development Department estimates counted 125,400 jobs in August 2026. Service-providing industries accounted for 103,400, including 23,100 government jobs, 21,100 in leisure and hospitality, and 20,300 in private education and health services. Manufacturing accounted for 8,100 jobs and farming for 5,300. These monthly estimates are not seasonally adjusted.

=== Agriculture and wine ===
Strawberries and wine grapes were the county’s first- and second-largest agricultural crops by value in 2024. The county contains the Paso Robles, Edna Valley, Arroyo Grande Valley, and San Luis Obispo Coast viticultural areas; Edna Valley and Arroyo Grande Valley lie within the San Luis Obispo Coast area.

In 2025, San Luis Obispo County had 15,273 acres planted with Cabernet Sauvignon, the second-largest acreage among California counties after Napa County.

The county led the state in hemp cultivation in 2018 as hundreds of acres of the crop were grown in research partnerships. In 2019, nine agricultural research permits were still active. Sixteen commercial permits were issued before a temporary ban on new applications running through June 2020 was passed by the Board of Supervisors.

=== Income and housing ===
The following indicators are five-year American Community Survey estimates for 2020–2024. The separate 2019–2023 survey estimated the county’s poverty rate at 12.8% and its household-income Gini index at 0.4740, compared with 12.0% and 0.4887 statewide.

Economic and housing indicators, 2020–2024
Indicator	San Luis Obispo County	California
Median household income (2024 dollars)	$97,446	$99,122
Owner-occupied housing rate	62.1%	55.9%
Adults aged 25 and older with a bachelor’s degree or higher	39.8%	37.1%
Median value of owner-occupied housing units	$824,700	$734,700

=== Tourism ===
Visit California’s economic impact report estimated $2.37 billion in direct travel spending in the county in 2025 and 24,580 tourism-supported jobs. Hearst Castle offers tours of the former Hearst estate in San Simeon. Coastal recreation includes beaches, camping, hiking, and wildlife viewing in state parks around San Simeon, Morro Bay, and Pismo Beach.

=== Energy ===
Pacific Gas and Electric Company operates Diablo Canyon Power Plant. In December 2023, the California Public Utilities Commission approved continued operation through 2030, extending the previous closure schedule. Separately, the Nuclear Regulatory Commission renewed the federal operating licenses in April 2026, with expiration dates of November 2, 2044, for Unit 1 and August 26, 2045, for Unit 2.

== Media ==
The San Luis Obispo Pioneer was the first newspaper published in San Luis Obispo County between January 4, 1868, and December 1869. It was a weekly, owned and edited by Rome G. Vickers. Vickers began the newspaper by announcing that it would be nonpartisan, but in the 1868 presidential election, he endorsed the Democratic Party ticket headed by Horatio Seymour, thus losing support from Republicans and paving the way for the successful launch in 1869 of the San Luis Obispo Tribune, which is still being published. Vickers, whom a contemporary article described as coming from New Orleans, Louisiana, although no documentation of his residence there has been found, was 26 years old when he began the four-page Pioneer. David Middlecamp described the newspaper as racist in tone and Vickers' writing was "often reactive, mean, poorly sourced and boastful." After the paper folded, Vickers worked in printing and reporting in San Diego, Los Angeles and the San Francisco Bay Area. The Pioneer did, however, publish the first newspaper extra in the county's history, concerning the destruction of the coastal steamer Sierra Nevada, which ran ashore north of Piedras Blancas, California, in 1869.

== Government, politics, and policing ==
=== Government ===
The government of San Luis Obispo County is defined and authorized under the California Constitution and law as a general-law county. The county government provides countywide services such as elections and voter registration, jails, vital records, property records, tax collection, public health, and social services. In addition, the county is the local government for all unincorporated areas.

=== Law enforcement ===
The San Luis Obispo County Sheriff’s Office provides law enforcement in unincorporated areas. It operates the county jail, serves civil process, and provides bailiff services to the courts. Its patrol stations are in Oceano, Templeton, and Los Osos.

The county’s seven incorporated cities have separate reporting agencies in the Department of Justice’s crime dataset. The California Highway Patrol’s San Luis Obispo Area covers portions of US 101 and State Route 1 and unincorporated communities including Nipomo, Oceano, Cayucos, and Los Osos.

=== Voter registration ===
Population and registered voters
Total population (January 1, 2026)	279,242	
Registered voters (September 4, 2026) (Note: Registered voters as of September 4, 2026, divided by estimated total population on January 1, 2026. Party percentages use registered voters as the denominator. Democratic–Republican spreads are in percentage points. The city tables combine minor parties, unknown registrations and other registrations in the Other column.)	182,733	65.44%
Democratic	69,969	38.29%
Republican	63,200	34.59%
American Independent	9,536	5.22%
Green	1,068	0.58%
Libertarian	2,468	1.35%
Peace and Freedom	724	0.40%
Other	1,104	0.60%
Unknown	927	0.51%
No party preference	33,737	18.46%
Democratic–Republican spread	+6,769	+3.70 percentage points

==== Cities by population and voter registration ====
Cities by population and voter registration
City	Population (January 1, 2026)	Registered voters (September 4, 2026)	Democratic	Republican	D–R spread (percentage points)	Other	No party preference
Arroyo Grande	17,780	13,115 (73.76%)	36.78%	36.20%	+0.59	8.52%	18.50%
Atascadero	30,184	20,517 (67.97%)	34.19%	38.69%	-4.50	8.77%	18.36%
El Paso de Robles (Paso Robles)	31,525	18,806 (59.65%)	33.34%	39.72%	-6.38	8.43%	18.52%
Grover Beach	12,502	8,005 (64.03%)	37.96%	32.40%	+5.56	9.83%	19.80%
Morro Bay	10,307	8,038 (77.99%)	44.14%	28.10%	+16.04	9.14%	18.61%
Pismo Beach	7,773	6,213 (79.93%)	35.91%	36.99%	-1.08	9.16%	17.95%
San Luis Obispo	50,165	29,553 (58.91%)	52.23%	19.12%	+33.11	7.96%	20.68%

=== Overview ===
In the 2024 presidential election, Kamala Harris received 81,314 votes in the county and Donald Trump received 64,932.

United States presidential election results for San Luis Obispo County, California
Year	Republican		Democratic		Third party(ies)	
Year	No.	%	No.	%	No.	%
1880	830	47.81%	729	41.99%	177	10.20%
1884	1,233	51.44%	1,069	44.60%	95	3.96%
1888	1,689	49.68%	1,585	46.62%	126	3.71%
1892	1,433	38.10%	1,199	31.88%	1,129	30.02%
1896	1,671	43.74%	2,056	53.82%	93	2.43%
1900	1,564	45.81%	1,713	50.18%	137	4.01%
1904	2,015	54.95%	1,167	31.82%	485	13.23%
1908	2,008	50.76%	1,381	34.91%	567	14.33%
1912	13	0.23%	2,248	40.48%	3,292	59.28%
1916	2,854	40.20%	3,539	49.85%	706	9.95%
1920	4,123	61.31%	1,606	23.88%	996	14.81%
1924	3,804	49.01%	731	9.42%	3,226	41.57%
1928	5,425	60.82%	3,336	37.40%	159	1.78%
1932	3,449	28.59%	7,933	65.77%	680	5.64%
1936	4,812	37.28%	7,889	61.13%	205	1.59%
1940	7,204	45.25%	8,499	53.39%	217	1.36%
1944	7,793	48.90%	8,068	50.63%	75	0.47%
1948	10,325	53.49%	8,135	42.14%	844	4.37%
1952	17,716	65.37%	9,174	33.85%	213	0.79%
1956	16,223	58.47%	11,407	41.11%	118	0.43%
1960	17,862	54.04%	14,975	45.30%	218	0.66%
1964	14,906	40.08%	22,252	59.84%	28	0.08%
1968	19,420	51.27%	15,828	41.78%	2,633	6.95%
1972	28,566	55.98%	20,779	40.72%	1,688	3.31%
1976	27,785	51.17%	24,926	45.91%	1,587	2.92%
1980	38,631	55.56%	20,508	29.50%	10,388	14.94%
1984	49,035	63.72%	26,946	35.02%	969	1.26%
1988	46,613	55.85%	35,667	42.73%	1,187	1.42%
1992	36,384	34.78%	40,136	38.36%	28,099	26.86%
1996	46,733	46.50%	40,395	40.19%	13,372	13.31%
2000	56,859	52.22%	44,526	40.89%	7,501	6.89%
2004	67,995	52.69%	58,742	45.52%	2,313	1.79%
2008	61,055	46.03%	68,176	51.39%	3,422	2.58%
2012	59,967	47.73%	61,258	48.76%	4,413	3.51%
2016	56,164	41.60%	67,107	49.71%	11,738	8.69%
2020	67,436	42.22%	88,310	55.29%	3,968	2.48%
2024	64,932	43.05%	81,314	53.92%	4,566	3.03%

The county is divided between California's 24th congressional district, represented by Democrat Salud Carbajal and California's 19th congressional district, represented by Democrat Jimmy Panetta, which includes northern San Luis Obispo County.

The county is represented in the California State Senate by the 17th senatorial district, represented by Democrat John Laird and the 21st senatorial district, represented by Democrat Monique Limón, and in the California State Assembly by the 30th Assembly district, represented by Democrat Dawn Addis and the 37th Assembly district, represented by Democrat Gregg Hart.

In April 2008, the California Secretary of State reported that there were 147,326 registered voters in San Luis Obispo County. Of those voters, 61,226 (41.6%) were registered Republicans, 52,586 (35.7%) were registered Democratic, 8,030 (5.4%) were registered with other political parties, and 25,484 (17.3%) declined to state a political preference. The cities of Grover Beach, Morro Bay, and San Luis Obispo had pluralities or majorities of registered Democratic voters, whereas the other incorporated cities and the unincorporated area had Republican pluralities.

== Crime ==
The following tables show offenses reported to the California Department of Justice in 2025.

Reported offenses in San Luis Obispo County, 2025 (Note: County counts are sums of the 16 reporting-agency records assigned to San Luis Obispo County in the Department of Justice dataset, including city, sheriff, campus, state, and railroad agencies.)
Offense	Number reported	Rate per 1,000 residents (Note: Rates are calculated as reported offenses divided by the January 1, 2025 population estimate, multiplied by 1,000, and rounded to two decimal places.)
Population (January 1, 2025)	279,666	
Violent crime	837	2.99
Homicide	4	0.01
Rape	154	0.55
Robbery	58	0.21
Aggravated assault	621	2.22
Property crime (Note: Property crime includes all reported larceny-theft, along with burglary and motor vehicle theft. The Department of Justice adopted the expanded definition of rape in 2014, so the rape figures are not directly comparable with the former forcible-rape category.)	2,918	10.43
Burglary	386	1.38
Larceny-theft	2,256	8.07
Motor vehicle theft	276	0.99
Arson	31	0.11

=== Cities by population and crime rates ===
City police department reports, 2025 (Note: City figures are those reported by the named city’s police department; they exclude separately reporting agencies, such as campus police. They do not add up to the county totals.)
City	Population (January 1, 2025)	Violent crimes	Violent crime rate per 1,000 residents	Property crimes	Property crime rate per 1,000 residents
Arroyo Grande	17,922	23	1.28	103	5.75
Atascadero	30,223	42	1.39	213	7.05
Grover Beach	12,541	25	1.99	82	6.54
Morro Bay	10,379	20	1.93	106	10.21
Paso Robles	31,151	110	3.53	487	15.63
Pismo Beach	7,836	30	3.83	138	17.61
San Luis Obispo	49,849	175	3.51	1,032	20.70

== Fire protection ==
San Luis Obispo County Fire Department
Agency overview
- Employees: 121 full-time CAL FIRE positions (FY 2026–27 recommended)
- Annual budget: $41.8 million (FY 2026–27 recommended)
- Fire chief: John Owens

Facilities and equipment
- Battalions: 7 (joint CAL FIRE/county organization)
- Airport crash: 2 at Airport Station 21

Website
- Official website

In unincorporated parts of the county, fire protection and emergency response services have been provided by the San Luis Obispo County Fire Department, through a cooperative agreement with CAL FIRE, since 1930. The county fire department also serves Los Osos and Avila Beach. In Oceano, the county contracts with the Five Cities Fire Authority for fire protection. The city of San Luis Obispo is served by the San Luis Obispo City Fire Department.

The county’s recommended fire budget for fiscal year 2026–27 provides for 121 full-time CAL FIRE contract positions. The department and CAL FIRE reorganized their battalion boundaries on July 1, 2025. The South Coast Battalion covers Nipomo and the Mesa area, while the San Luis Obispo Battalion covers San Luis Obispo and surrounding areas. Airport Station 21 provides aircraft rescue and firefighting as well as service to Edna Valley and surrounding rural areas.

The 2026 unit fire plan identified 17 agencies operating 48 fire stations throughout the county. An automatic mutual aid system dispatches the closest engine regardless of jurisdiction.

Specialized county fire resources include a rescue vehicle and water tender at Airport Station 21, the HazMat 1 hazardous-materials response unit at Meridian Station 52, and a regional breathing-air and lighting unit at Avila Station 62. Heritage Ranch Station 33 operates a wildland engine and a fire-rescue boat for Lake Nacimiento.

== Transportation ==
=== Major highways ===
- U.S. Route 101
- State Route 1
- State Route 33
- State Route 41
- State Route 46
- State Route 58
- State Route 166
- State Route 227
- State Route 229

=== Public transportation ===
Amtrak’s Pacific Surfliner connects San Luis Obispo and Grover Beach with Los Angeles and San Diego. The Coast Starlight serves San Luis Obispo and Paso Robles on its Los Angeles–Seattle route. The San Luis Obispo Regional Transit Authority provides countywide service along US 101 as well as service to Morro Bay, Los Osos, Cambria and San Simeon.

Local services include SLO Transit in San Luis Obispo, Dial-A-Ride in Atascadero, and routes A and B in Paso Robles, operated by the Regional Transit Authority. Passengers can transfer between RTA and SLO Transit at the San Luis Obispo Government Center.

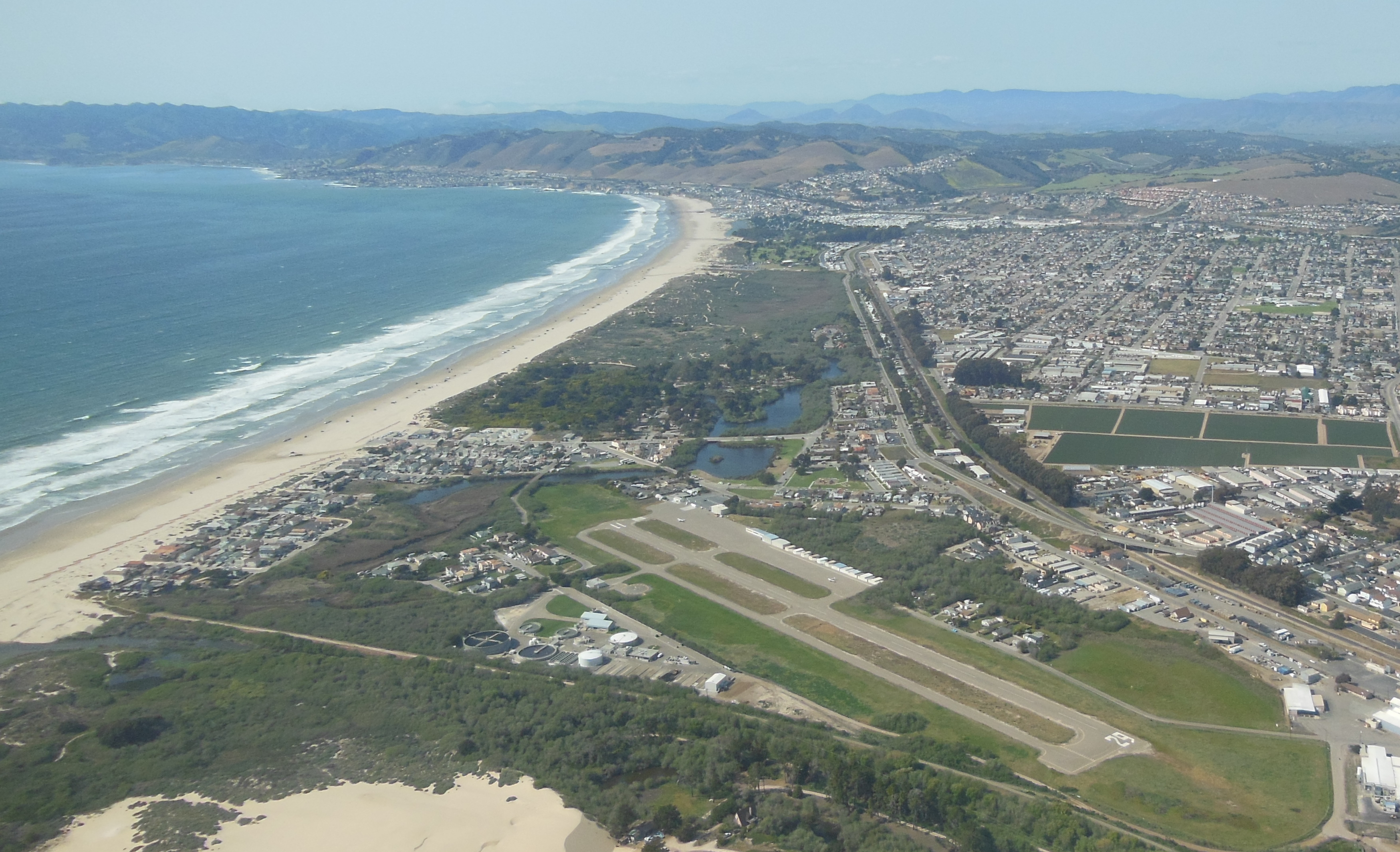
Oceano County Airport in 2013

Intercity bus connections are available through the Greyhound and FlixBus network.

Gold Runner’s Route 18 provides seasonal bus service between Hanford and San Luis Obispo, including a stop at Cal Poly, on selected dates tied to the university’s academic calendar. The seasonal service began on August 22, 2026.

FlixBus boards from the San Luis Obispo Railroad Museum at 1940 Santa Barbara Avenue.

=== Airports ===
The county has three publicly owned airports. The county owns San Luis Obispo County Regional Airport and Oceano County Airport; the City of Paso Robles owns Paso Robles Municipal Airport.

- San Luis Obispo County Regional Airport (SBP) is located just south of the city of San Luis Obispo. Scheduled passenger flights are operated by Alaska Airlines, American Airlines, and United Airlines. The airport recorded 811,905 arriving and departing airline passengers in 2025.
- Paso Robles Municipal Airport (PRB) is located northeast of the city of Paso Robles and is home to California Highway Patrol and CAL FIRE and the Estrella Warbirds Museum. The city-owned airport covers 1,300 acres and serves general aviation, charter, military, and air ambulance flights. It has no scheduled airline service.
- Oceano County Airport (L52) is located on the coast in the Five Cities area. The county-owned facility serves general aviation. It lies between Pismo State Beach, the Union Pacific Railroad, and Pismo Dunes Natural Preserve.

=== Highway improvements and historical proposals ===
A 1970 federal highway report listed a proposed addition to the Interstate Highway System between Buttonwillow and Barstow via Bakersfield.

Caltrans is widening the SR 46 corridor between US 101 and Interstate 5 to a four-lane divided expressway. The Cholame section was completed in 2025. A grade-separated interchange at the SR 41/46 junction opened in June 2025. The planned Antelope Grade section would connect the four-lane sections in San Luis Obispo and Kern counties.

== Education ==
=== Primary and secondary education ===
The San Luis Obispo County Office of Education provides alternative education and special education services throughout the county.

The 2020 Census identified the following school districts as serving parts of the county:

K–12 unified:

- Atascadero Unified School District
- Coast Unified School District (some areas for PK–12, some for 9–12 only)
- Cuyama Joint Unified School District
- Lucia Mar Unified School District
- Paso Robles Joint Unified School District (some areas for PK–12, some for 9–12 only)
- San Luis Coastal Unified School District
- Shandon Joint Unified School District
- Templeton Unified School District

Elementary:

- Cayucos Elementary School District
- Pleasant Valley Joint Union Elementary School District
- San Miguel Joint Union School District

=== Higher education ===
Cal Poly, founded in 1901, had 23,245 students at its San Luis Obispo campus in fall 2025.

Cuesta College, established in 1963, serves the San Luis Obispo County Community College District. It has its main campus in San Luis Obispo, a North County Campus in Paso Robles, and a South County Center in Arroyo Grande. The college offers associate degrees, certificates, university-transfer courses, career technical education, and continuing education.

Laurus College offers online programs with on-site support in San Luis Obispo and Atascadero.

== Communities ==
=== Cities ===
The county has seven incorporated cities.

- Arroyo Grande
- Atascadero
- Grover Beach
- Morro Bay
- Paso Robles
- Pismo Beach
- San Luis Obispo (county seat)

=== Unincorporated communities ===
- Avila Beach (Note: For statistical purposes, defined by the United States Census Bureau as a census-designated place (CDP).)
- Baywood Park
- Blacklake
- California Polytechnic State University
- California Valley
- Callender
- Cambria
- Cayucos
- Creston
- Cholame
- Edna
- Garden Farms
- Halcyon
- Harmony
- Huasna
- Lake Nacimiento
- Los Berros
- Los Osos
- Los Ranchos
- Nipomo
- Oak Shores
- Oceano
- Pozo
- San Miguel
- San Simeon
- Santa Margarita
- Shandon
- Templeton
- Whitley Gardens
- Woodlands

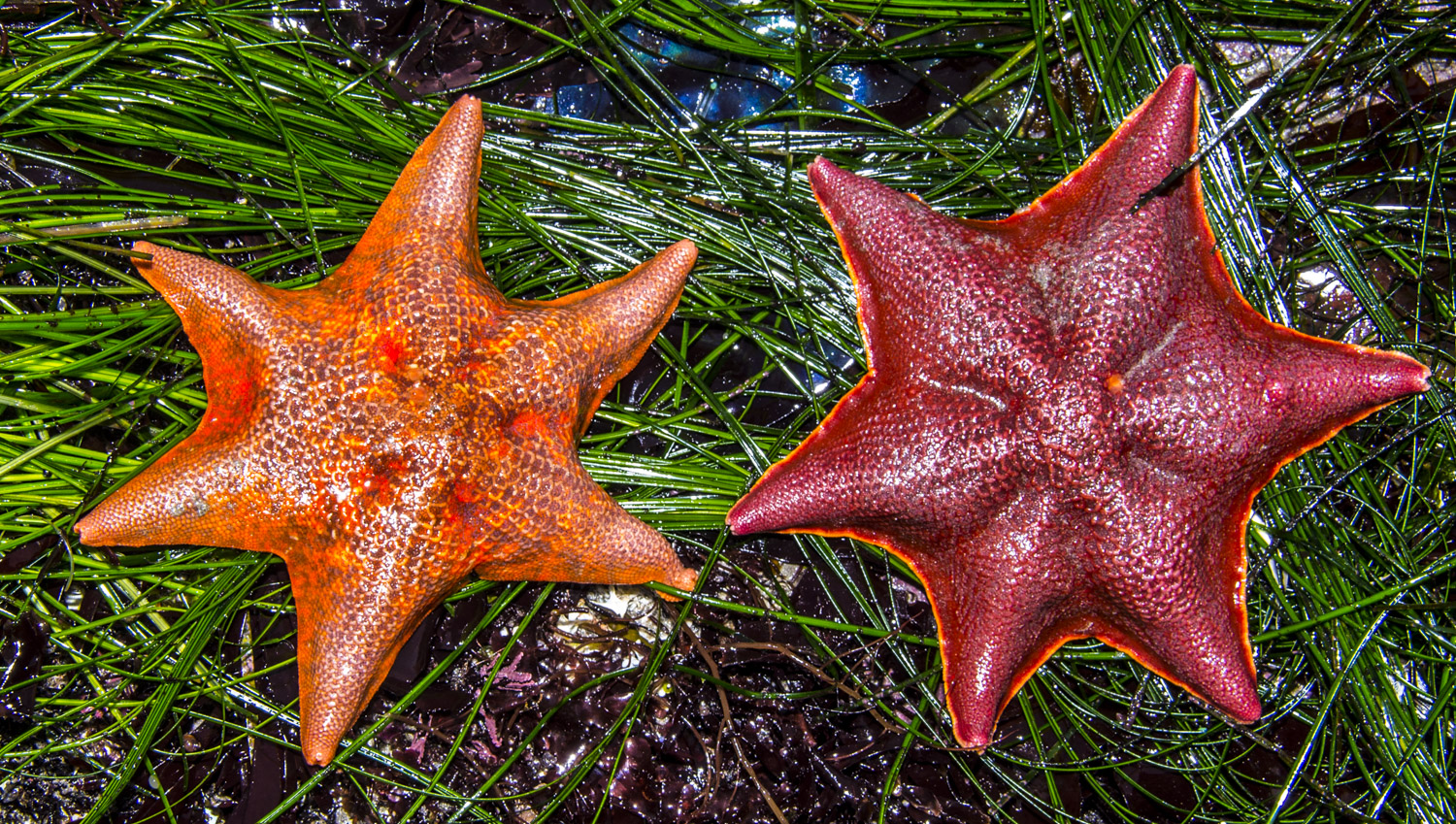
Pair of bat stars near Los Osos

=== Community populations ===
The following table lists selected incorporated cities and census-designated places and their 2020 census populations.

† county seat

Selected community populations, 2020 census
Community	Type	Population
Arroyo Grande	City	18,441
Atascadero	City	29,773
Avila Beach	CDP	1,576
Blacklake	CDP	1,016
Callender	CDP	1,282
Cambria	CDP	5,678
Cayucos	CDP	2,505
Creston	CDP	98
Edna	CDP	184
Garden Farms	CDP	449
Grover Beach	City	12,701
Lake Nacimiento	CDP	2,956
Los Berros	CDP	623
Los Osos	CDP	14,465
Los Ranchos	CDP	1,516
Morro Bay	City	10,757
Nipomo	CDP	18,176
Oak Shores	CDP	316
Oceano	CDP	7,183
Paso Robles (El Paso de Robles)	City	31,490
Pismo Beach	City	8,072
† San Luis Obispo	City	47,063
San Miguel	CDP	3,172
San Simeon	CDP	445
Santa Margarita	CDP	1,291
Shandon	CDP	1,168
Templeton	CDP	8,386
Whitley Gardens	CDP	325
Woodlands	CDP	1,933

== See also ==
- San Luis Obispo County Search and Rescue
- List of museums in the California Central Coast
- List of school districts in San Luis Obispo County, California
- National Register of Historic Places listings in San Luis Obispo County, California
- Dalidio Ranch Project, a development proposal in San Luis Obispo County
- Amphibious Training Base Morro Bay
