= Oak Shores, California =

Oak Shores
- census-designated place
- Position in California.
- Coordinates: 35°46′08″N 120°58′44″W
- Country: United States
- State: California
- County: San Luis Obispo

Area
  - Total: 5.865 sq mi (15.191 km^{2})
  - Land: 5.088 sq mi (13.179 km^{2})
  - Water: 0.777 sq mi (2.012 km^{2}) 13.25%
- Elevation: 1,814 ft (553 m)

Population (2020)
  - Total: 316
  - Density: 62.1/sq mi (24.0/km^{2})
- Time zone: UTC-8 (Pacific (PST))
  - Summer (DST): UTC-7 (PDT)
- ZIP Code: 93426
- GNIS feature ID: 2583101

Oak Shores is a census-designated place in northern San Luis Obispo County, central California, United States. As of the 2020 census, Oak Shores had a population of 316.

== Geography ==
Oak Shores is located on the north side of Lake Nacimiento reservoir. It is in the Santa Lucia Mountains, at an elevation of 1,814 feet (553 m).

According to the United States Census Bureau, the CDP covers an area of 5.9 square miles (15.2 km^{2}), of which 5.1 square miles (13.2 km^{2}) is land.

== Demographics ==
Historical population
Census	Pop.	Note	%±
2010	337		—
2020	316		−6.2%
U.S. Decennial Census; 1850–1870 1880-1890; 1900 1910 1920; 1930 1940 1950; 1960 1970 1980; 1990 2000 2010

Oak Shores first appeared as a census designated place in the 2010 U.S. census.

The 2020 United States census reported that Oak Shores had a population of 316. The population density was 62.1 inhabitants per square mile (24.0/km^{2}). The racial makeup of Oak Shores was 277 (87.7%) White, 2 (0.6%) African American, 2 (0.6%) Native American, 2 (0.6%) Asian, 1 (0.3%) Pacific Islander, 8 (2.5%) from other races, and 24 (7.6%) from two or more races. Hispanic or Latino of any race were 29 persons (9.2%).

The whole population lived in households. There were 156 households, out of which 27 (17.3%) had children under the age of 18 living in them, 95 (60.9%) were married-couple households, 13 (8.3%) were cohabiting couple households, 28 (17.9%) had a female householder with no partner present, and 20 (12.8%) had a male householder with no partner present. 28 households (17.9%) were one person, and 21 (13.5%) were one person aged 65 or older. The average household size was 2.03. There were 113 families (72.4% of all households).

The age distribution was 43 people (13.6%) under the age of 18, 6 people (1.9%) aged 18 to 24, 59 people (18.7%) aged 25 to 44, 118 people (37.3%) aged 45 to 64, and 90 people (28.5%) who were 65 years of age or older. The median age was 58.0 years. For every 100 females, there were 82.7 males.

There were 671 housing units at an average density of 131.9 units per square mile (50.9 units/km^{2}), of which 156 (23.2%) were occupied. Of these, 135 (86.5%) were owner-occupied, and 21 (13.5%) were occupied by renters.

== Education ==
Oak Shores is served by the San Miguel Joint Union Elementary School District and by the Paso Robles Joint Unified School District for grades 9-12 only.
