= Chris Burkard =

American photographer

- Born: March 12, 1986 (age 40); San Luis Obispo, California, U.S.
- Occupation: Photographer
- Website: chrisburkard.com

Chris Burkard is an American photographer and artist, based in the California Central Coast region. He photographs landscape, lifestyle, surf, outdoor, and travel subjects. Burkard takes a photojournalistic approach to make editorial projects, using multiple media. He uses natural light to capture humanizing moments.

Burkard specializes in photographing in cold places, including in Iceland, Norway, the Faroe Islands, India, Cuba, New Zealand, Russia, Switzerland, and Italy. Burkard has been named a top travel influencer.

== Early life and education ==
Burkard was born in San Luis Obispo, California. He was raised by a single mother; she married his stepfather when Chris was 12 and they joined a family of five. He is a graduate of Arroyo Grande High School. After completing high school in 2004 at the age of 18, Burkard enrolled in classes at Cuesta Junior College. He became exposed to photography as an art form and the idea of composition quickly captured his attention. Growing up near the ocean and participating in water sports such as body surfing, bodyboarding, and surfing, Burkard sought to use photography as a mode of expression to highlight the movement of water and document his friends.

Burkard purchased his first camera from a Goodwill auction for $65, and after shooting and developing an entire roll of slide film he realized the camera didn't work. He then borrowed a camera from his girlfriend's mom, and began shooting regularly, experimenting with different lighting and contexts. Raised on the cusp of photography's mainstream transformation from film to digital in the mid-2000s, Burkard is self-taught in both.

In 2006, Burkard shadowed large format landscape photographer Michael Fatali, whose images of the American Southwest desert are published frequently. Later that year, Burkard interned under Transworld Surfing photo editor, Pete Taras.

== Career ==
In the early years of his career, Burkard worked as a freelance photographer on both editorial and commercial projects, as well as having work published on over 35 national and international covers of magazines including Surfer Magazine (both print and digital), The New Yorker, National Geographic Adventure, and ESPN.com.

Beginning in 2009, Burkard was contracted by Patagonia, Inc. as a project photographer. Burkard also operates a full service studio in Grover Beach, California, shooting commercial and editorial work. Burkard has spoken at TED.

In 2006, Burkard interned at Transworld Surf Magazine for four months prior to becoming assistant photo editor. In 2008, at age 21, Burkard earned a position as the senior staff photographer at Surfline, a global surf forecasting and content site, based in California. At this time he also served as senior staff photographer at Water Magazine until his departure in 2010. Burkard was hired at Surfer Magazine in 2010. As of May 2013, he holds the position as senior staff photographer.

After traveling and photographing Iceland for many years, Burkard is now sharing his local knowledge on Rexby, a platform that enables creators to set up and sell travel guides and consultations.

== Personal life ==
Burkard is a member of the Church of Jesus Christ of Latter-day Saints. Burkard lives in Grover Beach with his wife Breanne; they married in 2007 and have two sons, Jeremiah and Forrest.

== Awards ==
- Morro Bay Art Society Award 2005.
- Follow the Light Foundation Flame Grant Winner 2006, commemorating long-time Photo Editor for Surfing Magazine, Larry "Flame" Moore, who died one year prior. Burkard was able to fund a six-month surfing trip along the California coast, which was later published as "The California Surf Project" by Chronicle Books.
- Red Bull Illume: Illumination and Overall Image Quest Winner 2010 – The work of the finalists is exhibited in a worldwide tour before revealing the winners in a final grand ceremony
- The World Open of Photography 2nd Place Open Winner 2012 – An international photography competition spanning multiple categories, The World Open of Photography named Burkard the 2nd Place Open Category Winner
- Red Bull Illume: Category Finalist (Spirit) 2013 – In August 2013 Burkard was a finalist in the Red Bull Illume "Spirit" category.
- Olympus Pro Photographer Showdown April 2013 – As part of the World Ski & Snowboard Festival held in Whistler, British Columbia, Burkard was granted the People's Choice Award in the action sports photography competition.
- PMDA Visionary Photographer Award, 2016, in Las Vegas, NV.

== Publications ==
- The California Surf Project (Chronicle Books, 2010) 8 ISBN 978-0811862820 – documents the six-month surfing exploration of Burkard and his friend, professional surfer, Eric Soderquist, down the California Coastline in a 1976 Volkswagen bus. Starting from the Oregon border and heading south to Tijuana, the pair recorded their search for a California of the past and the discovery of California's coastline today, using the Pacific Coast Highway as their guide.
- Come Hell or High Water: Plight of the Torpedo People (Woodshed Films, 2013) ISBN 978-1938922084 – Burkard was named principal photographer documenting the debut film release directed by Patagonia Ambassador, Keith Malloy. This bodysurfing film and book documents "The Plight of the Torpedo People," a type of graceful water movement using the human body to carve in and around ocean waves. Burkard served as contributing cinematographer. The film has received "Best Cinematography" award in 2011 from the New York Surf Film Festival
- Russia: The Outpost Vol. 1 (self-published, 2013) – A collaboration with the director Ben Weiland, Russia: The Outpost Vol. 2 is a combination small-format photography book of Burkard's images and short stories by both Ben and Burkard, as well as a DVD documenting their trip to Russia with surfers Dane Gudauskas, Cyrus Sutton, Trevor Gordon and Keith Malloy.
- Distant Shores (Ammo, 2014) ISBN 978-1623260170 – a compendium of Burkard's work from Alaska, the Caribbean, Chile, Christmas Island, Iceland, India, Japan, Nicaragua, New Zealand, Norway, Mexico and Russia. Featuring an interview with Burkard conducted by Steve Crist, the book is composed mostly of highlights from each location.
- The Boy Who Spoke to the Earth (Dreamling, 2015) – Burkard's first short story, illustrated by David McClellan. A story that follows the young protagonist as he travels through the wilderness. Encompassing themes that are central to Burkard's work, such as exploration, observation, inspiration and the pursuit of joy.
- High Tide (Mendo, 2015) ISBN 978-9089896544 – a collection of work from Burkard's most recent travels; from the Arctic Circle south to the Roaring Forties. With stories by Michael Kew, Ben Weiland and Zander Morton, High Tide.

== Films ==
- Russia: The Outpost Vol. 1 (2013)
- Faroes: The Outpost Vol. 2 (2015)
- The Cradle of Storms (2014)
- Under an Arctic Sky (2017)

== Exhibitions ==
- Look Between Photo Festival, Look3, 2010,
