= Lucia Mar Unified School District =

School district in California

Address
- 602 Orchard Street Arroyo Grande, California, 93420; United States

District information
- Type: Public
- Grades: K–12
- NCES District ID: 0623080

Students and staff
- Students: 9,921 (2020–2021)
- Teachers: 502.56 (FTE)
- Staff: 553.4 (FTE)
- Student–teacher ratio: 19.74:1

Other information
- Website: www.luciamarschools.org

The Lucia Mar Unified School District (LMUSD) is the largest school district in San Luis Obispo County, with about 10,700 students. It covers 550 square miles (1,400 km^{2}) at the southern end of the county, from Shell Beach (at the north end of Pismo Beach) to the county line at the Santa Maria River.

== Boundary ==
The district includes the municipalities of Arroyo Grande and Grover Beach as well as the census-designated places of Blacklake, Callender, Los Berros, Nipomo, Oceano, and Woodlands. The district also includes a portion of Pismo Beach municipality. This territory also encompasses the communities of Shell Beach, Halcyon and Huasna.

== School changes ==
Central Coast New Tech High School opened in 2012 with a freshman class. The school added a freshman class each year, reaching all four classes in the 2015–2016 school year. Two new schools have been built in Nipomo: Nipomo High School in 2002, and Dorothea Lange Elementary in 2006. A few years earlier, Lopez High School moved to a new campus on the Nipomo Mesa. And Arroyo Grande High School underwent a major renovation with new Career Technical Education buildings and facilities, including a new pool, tennis courts and multi-purpose room. The 'Clark Center For The Performing Arts' opened on the Arroyo Grande High School campus in 2002. It is used by all the schools in the district and the community. A new gym was built for Mesa Middle School and a multi-purpose room with covered eating area was constructed at Paulding Middle School.

== Schools ==
=== High schools ===
- Arroyo Grande High School
- Lopez High School
- Nipomo High School
- Central Coast New Tech High School

=== Middle schools ===
- Judkins Middle School

California Distinguished School 6-8

- Paulding Middle School
- Mesa Middle School

=== Elementary schools ===
- Branch Elementary School, TK-6, California Distinguished School
- Dana Elementary School, TK-6
- Dorothea Lange Elementary School, TK-6
- Fairgrove Elementary School, TK-7, California Distinguished School
- Grover Beach Elementary School, TK-6 International Baccalaureate World School
- Grover Heights Elementary School, TK-6
- Harloe Elementary School, K-6, opened September 1955, California Distinguished School
- Nipomo Elementary, TK-6
- Ocean View Elementary School, TK-6, California Distinguished School and National Blue Ribbon School
- Oceano Elementary School, TK-6
- Shell Beach Elementary School, TK-6

=== Independent Study School ===
- Pacific View Academy, K-12
