= San Luis Coastal Unified School District =

School district in California, United States

Address
- 1500 Lizzie Street San Luis Obispo, California, 93401; United States

District information
- Type: Public
- Grades: K–12
- NCES District ID: 0634800

Students and staff
- Students: 7,332
- Teachers: 358.46
- Staff: 442.63
- Student–teacher ratio: 20.45

Other information
- Website: www.slcusd.org

San Luis Coastal Unified School District is a school district primarily in San Luis Obispo, California.

== Boundary ==
The district includes the municipalities of San Luis Obispo and Morro Bay as well as the census-designated places of Avila Beach, California Polytechnic State University, San Luis Obispo, Edna, Los Osos, and Los Ranchos. A portion of Pismo Beach municipality and a small piece of Cayucos CDP extend into this district.

== List of schools ==
=== Elementary schools ===
- Baywood Elementary School
- Bishop's Peak Elementary School
- Charles E. Teach Elementary School
- C.L. Smith Elementary School
- Del Mar Elementary School
- Hawthorne Elementary School
- Los Ranchos Elementary School
- Monarch Grove Elementary School
- Pacheco Elementary School (named in honor of Romualdo Pacheco)
- Sinsheimer Elementary School

=== Middle schools ===
- Laguna Middle School
- Los Osos Middle School

=== High school ===
- Morro Bay High School
- Pacific Beach High School
- San Luis Obispo High School

=== Adult school ===
- Adult School
- Parent Participation Program
