= Edna, California =

Edna
- census-designated place
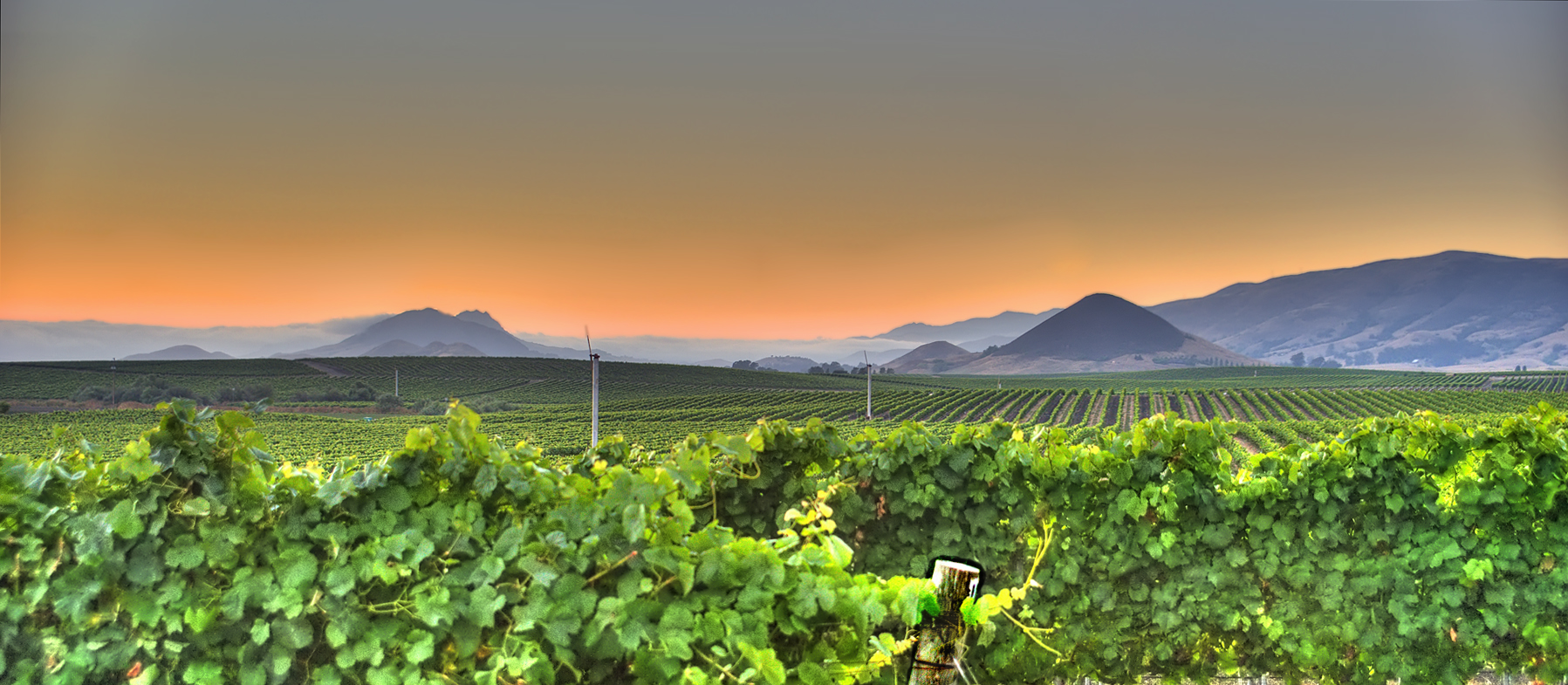
- Edna Valley

- Location of Edna in San Luis Obispo County, California.

- Position in California.
- Coordinates: 35°12′39″N 120°36′21″W
- Country: United States
- State: California
- County: San Luis Obispo

Area
  - Total: 1.219 sq mi (3.158 km^{2})
  - Land: 1.219 sq mi (3.158 km^{2})
  - Water: 0 sq mi (0 km^{2}) 0%
- Elevation: 266 ft (81 m)

Population (2020)
  - Total: 184
  - Density: 151/sq mi (58.3/km^{2})
- Time zone: UTC-8 (Pacific (PST))
  - Summer (DST): UTC-7 (PDT)
- ZIP code: 93401
- Area codes: 805 and 820
- GNIS feature ID: 2583005

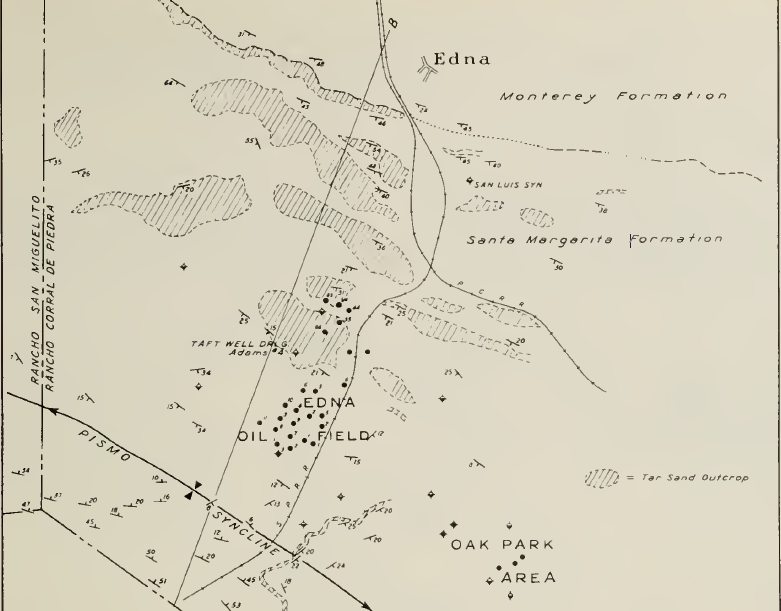
Edna geological map showing the location of tar sands

Edna is a census-designated place in San Luis Obispo County, California, United States. Edna is at a mean elevation of approximately 266 feet (81 m). The 2020 United States census reported Edna's population as 184. It is best known for the wine industry in the Edna Valley AVA.

== History ==
The community was founded by Dairyman Edgar Steele who purchased 58,000 acres and established a town to house his employees. In 1883 Lynford Maxwell subdivided the area and called it Maxwellton. The citizens later renamed it Edna. There was coal tar mining of bituminous rock in the 1880s and 1890s and more recently wine grape growing has become the prominent industry.

== Geography ==
According to the United States Census Bureau, the CDP covers an area of 1.2 square miles (3.1 km^{2}), all land.

The valley also includes Edna Fault, a prominent landform just south of the main community.

== Demographics ==
Historical population
Census	Pop.	Note	%±
2010	193		—
2020	184		−4.7%
U.S. Decennial Census; 2010

Edna first appeared as a census designated place in the 2010 U.S. census.

=== 2020 ===
The 2020 United States census reported that Edna had a population of 184. The population density was 150.9 inhabitants per square mile (58.3/km^{2}). The racial makeup of Edna was 152 (82.6%) White, 0 (0.0%) African American, 1 (0.5%) Native American, 1 (0.5%) Asian, 0 (0.0%) Pacific Islander, 13 (7.1%) from other races, and 17 (9.2%) from two or more races. Hispanic or Latino of any race were 20 persons (10.9%).

The whole population lived in households. There were 81 households, out of which 32 (39.5%) had children under the age of 18 living in them, 55 (67.9%) were married-couple households, 3 (3.7%) were cohabiting couple households, 6 (7.4%) had a female householder with no partner present, and 17 (21.0%) had a male householder with no partner present. 18 households (22.2%) were one person, and 8 (9.9%) were one person aged 65 or older. The average household size was 2.27. There were 62 families (76.5% of all households).

The age distribution was 34 people (18.5%) under the age of 18, 8 people (4.3%) aged 18 to 24, 33 people (17.9%) aged 25 to 44, 60 people (32.6%) aged 45 to 64, and 49 people (26.6%) who were 65 years of age or older. The median age was 51.8 years. There were 111 males and 73 females.

There were 84 housing units at an average density of 68.9 units per square mile (26.6 units/km^{2}), of which 81 (96.4%) were occupied. Of these, 61 (75.3%) were owner-occupied, and 20 (24.7%) were occupied by renters.

== Education ==
Edna is served by the San Luis Coastal Unified School District.
