= Ontario Hot Springs =

Geothermal site in California

- Avila Hot Springs; Hidden Valley Hot Springs; Hawaiian Hot Springs; Ontario Plunge; Budan Hot Springs
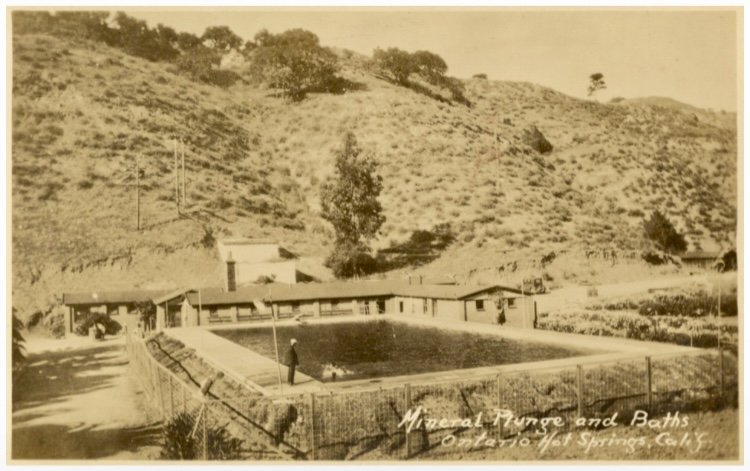
- Interactive map of Ontario Hot Springs
- Coordinates: 35.1805°N 120.703°W
- Elevation: 9 m (30 ft)
- Type: Thermal
- Discharge: 50 US gallons per minute (190 L/min)
- Temperature: 57 °C (135 °F)
- Depth: 14 m (46 ft)

Ontario Hot Springs is a hot-water well in southern San Luis Obispo County, California, United States. The geothermally heated water from the well is the central feature of a resort called Avila Hot Springs near Avila Beach.

== Geography ==
Ontario Hot Springs is about 8 mi (13 km) south of the city of San Luis Obispo along U.S. Route 101 in California. According to the U.S. Geographic Names Information System (GNIS), Ontario Hot Springs is located "along Gragg Canyon, 3.1 km (1.9 mi) east of the community of Avila Beach," at an elevation of 9 m (30 ft) above sea level. The resort is in a "level hollow surrounded by rural hills".

== History ==
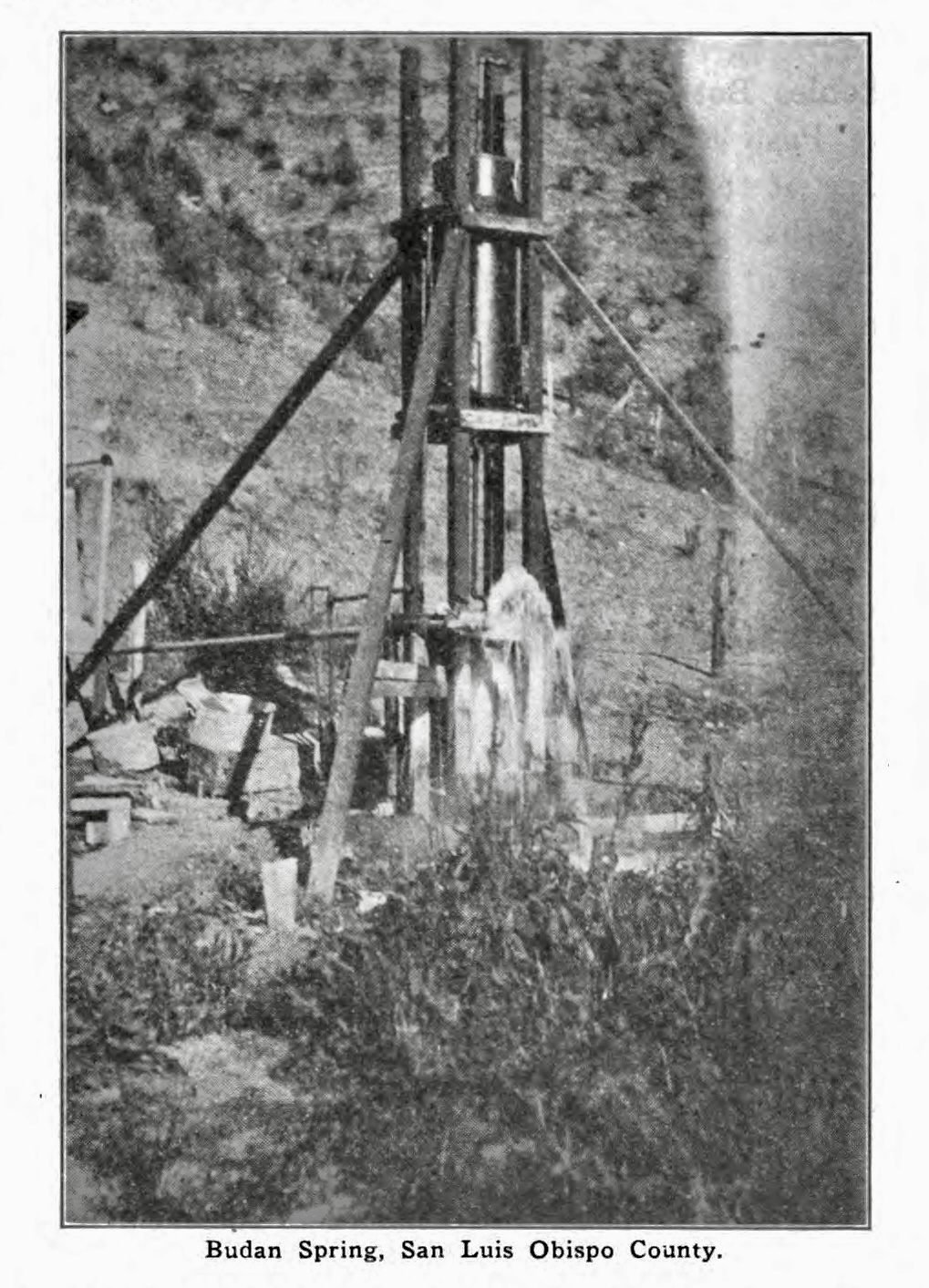
Budan Spring, San Luis Obispo County c. 1917, now known as Avila Hot Springs or Ontario Hot Springs

The hot springs are the result of an attempt to drill for petroleum on the ranch of Herman Budan in 1908, which his daughter Edith Budan had recently inherited. The drill struck "half a mile east of the San Luis spring, and in it a flow of gas and water similar to that in the early well had been obtained". Ontario Hot Springs are named after Ontario silver mine in Utah, which Herman Budan codiscovered with George Hearst and which became the basis of the Hearst family fortune when it was commercialized at some point after Budan departed Utah for California.

Circa 1917 Edith Budan ran the springs as a health resort. A report from the California mineral and mining bureau stated, "The temperature of the water is given as 175° Fahrenheit; it is too hot to be borne by the hand. The flow is through an iron pipe 3' above the ground and the water domes up over this noticeably. The equipment at present consists of three tubs for bathing, to which the water is conducted directly from the well". A county history reported, "She is conducting and is the owner of Ontario Hot Springs, located on the state highway between San Luis Obispo and Pismo, on a part of the ranch owned by her father...Here Miss Budan has erected suitable buildings, and a bath house with eight tubs. The accommodations are modern, and suitable attendants are provided for her patrons. She has built up a fine business and a great many people have been benefited by treatment at the Ontario Hot Springs." The springs, along with the Ontario Junction House, with its saloon and cabins, became a stopping point for the Hollywood crowd on their way to Hearst Castle at San Simeon, and visitors reportedly included Charlie Chaplin, W. C. Fields, and Rudolph Valentino. Amenities of the resort reportedly included alcohol during Prohibition, and sex workers.

Budan died in 1948 and left the springs to a charity that sold the land in 1954, and the property was sold again in 1969, undergoing several name changes between then and the 1990s, including Hawaiian Hot Springs, Hidden Valley Hot Springs, and Avila Hot Springs. As of 1969, the 16-acre (6.5 ha) Hidden Valley Hot Springs spa was "deteriorating" and the new owners renamed it Avila Hot Springs and began renovations. Circa 1979, the springs were operated as Avila Hot Springs and RV Park, and offered an outdoor swimming pool and soaking pool, and tiled "Roman tubs" indoors. The indoor tubs offered water up to 130 °F (54 °C). By 1990, the Los Angeles Times described it as "favorite vacation stop for families who like the informal atmosphere. Children especially enjoy the 50-by-100-foot freshwater swimming pool, recreation hall, and snack bar". According to the GNIS, "A proposal was submitted by the RMMC in August 1990 to change the name Ontario Hot Springs to Avila Hot Springs. On 10 September 1992, the U.S. Board on Geographic Names (USBGN) rejected the proposal in support of the California Advisory Committee on Geographic Names, which disapproved the name because the change appeared to be for commercial reasons." Avila Hot Springs continues to operate as a resort, offering cabin and tent camping with a spring-heated pool.

== Water profile ==
Reported water temperature ranges from 128–178 °F (53–81 °C). According to a 1968 survey, the water contains sodium bicarbonate and has a strong odor of hydrogen sulfide. The water has 540 mg/l total dissolved solids.

== See also ==
- Paso Robles Hot Springs
- Sycamore Mineral Springs Resort
- List of hot springs in the United States § California
- Pismo Formation
