= Measure B (disambiguation) =

Measure B was a 2012 Los Angeles County referendum to require adult film performers to use condoms when shooting scenes.

Measure B may also refer to:

- Measure B, a 1996 referendum to fund the Mountain View–Winchester (VTA) light rail line in Northern California
- Measure B, a 2005 referendum that was one of several initiated as part of the Dalidio Ranch Project in San Luis Obispo County
- Measure B, a 2005 referendum to fund schools for the city of Piedmont, California
- Measure B, a 2007 referendum to create the Twin Rivers Unified School District
- Measure B, a 2000 and 2008 referendum to fund Bay Area Rapid Transit expansion in Alameda County
- Measure B, a 2008 referendum to repeal the decriminalization of non-medical cannabis in Mendocino County, California
- Measure B, a 2012 referendum that made changes to the San Mateo County Board of Supervisor voting requirements

== See also ==
- Missouri Proposition B (1999), a 1999 Missouri proposition (referred to in some sources as a "Measure") that would have required local police authorities to issue concealed weapons permits to eligible citizens
