= Rancho Laguna (Alemany) =

Land grant in California

Coordinates: 35°15′16″N 120°41′37″W

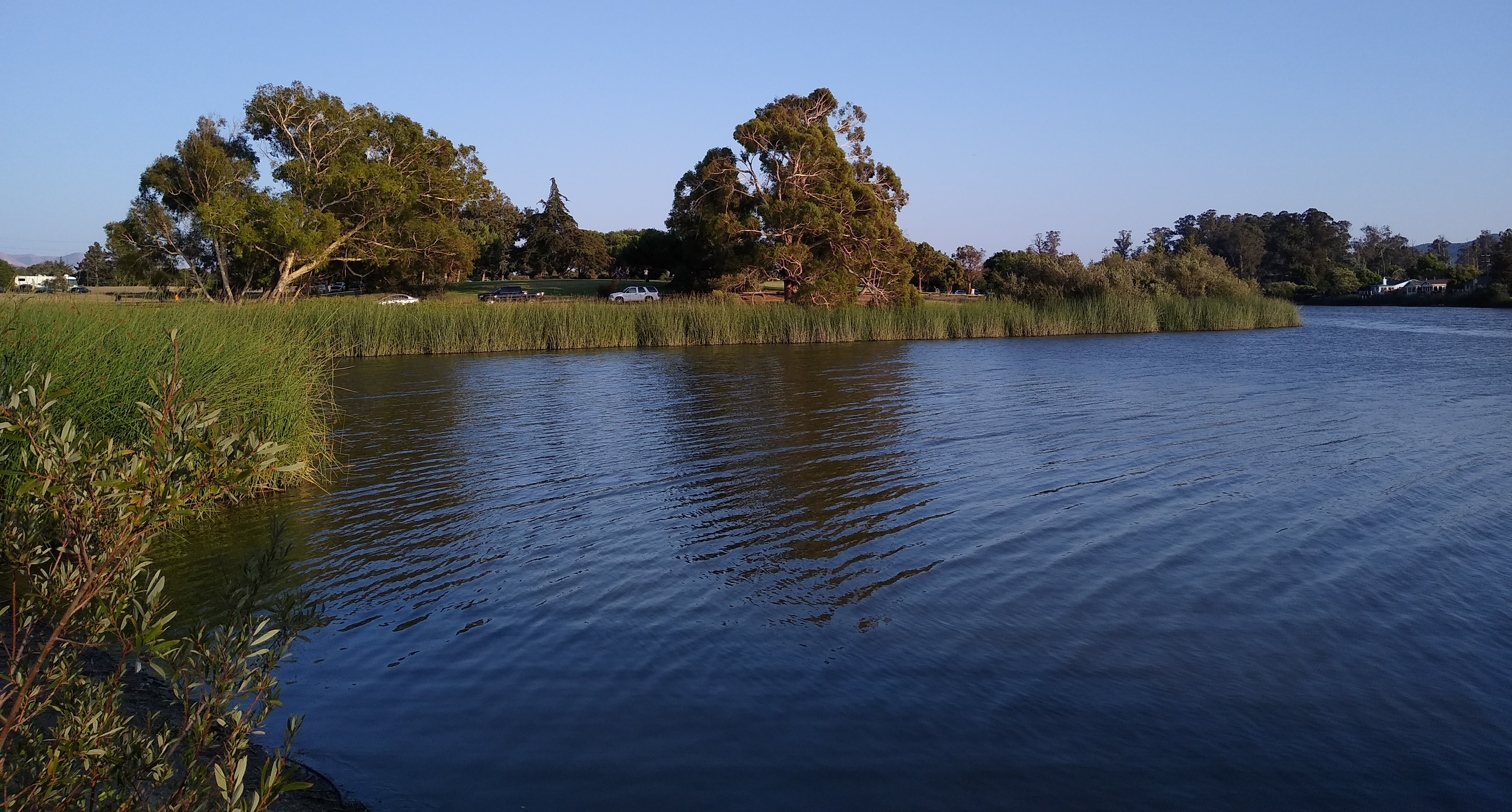
Laguna Lake in 2021

Rancho Laguna is part of the grazing lands granted to Mission San Luis Obispo de Tolosa in 1844, surrounding Laguna Lake at the head of the Los Osos Valley in the city of San Luis Obispo and San Luis Obispo County, California, United States. With Rancho Cañada de los Pinos, Rancho Laguna was one of the two ranchos returned to the Catholic Church. It was returned in 1859, after its confiscation in 1845.

== History ==
Rancho Laguna was part of the grazing lands granted to the Mission San Luis Obispo de Tolosa, founded in 1772 by Father Junípero Serra in San Luis Obispo County, California. These lands were lost to the Catholic Church due to the Mexican secularization act of 1833. With the Secularization act of 1833, the mission pasture and garden lands were sold or granted to Mexican citizens as ranchos over the next thirteen years. On 16 July 1844, Governor Micheltorena granted to Bishop Francisco García Diego y Moreno the Mission San Luis Obispo a vineyard, garden and a square league of grazing land around the Laguna for the support of worship. In 1845, the buildings of Mission San Luis Obispo de Tolosa except for the chapel were sold by Governor Pio Pico to John Wilson, everything except the church chapel was sold for a total of $510 (valued at $70,000 in 1845). The Rancho Laguna was also ceded by Pio Pico to Wilson in 1845, under protest by the bishop in September 1845.

On February 19, 1853 Archbishop J.S. Alemany filed petitions for the return of all former mission lands in the state. These cases, 609, 425, N. D., and 388 S. D., for the California Missions and other land was confirmed by the Commission on December 18, 1855. An appeal was dismissed in Northern District Court, on March 16, 1857, and in the Southern District on March 15, 1858. Consequently, the 4,157.02 acres of Rancho Laguna was patented to Bishop J. S. Alemany on February 4, 1859. After reading a letter from Bishop Alemany, President Abraham Lincoln signed a proclamation on March 18, 1865, just three weeks before Lincoln's assassination, that restored ownership of some the mission property to the Roman Catholic Church.

Ownership of 1,051.44 acres (4.2550 km^{2}) (essentially the exact area of land occupied by the original mission buildings, cemeteries, and gardens) was subsequently conveyed to the Church. Included with the Mission San Luis Obispo were the mission orchard and vineyard, and the land of the Rancho La Laguna, southwest of the town, in San Luis Obispo County, consisting of 4,157.02 acres (16.8229 km^{2}).

The Rancho Laguna was a diamond shaped section of land of 4,157.02 acres (16.8229 km^{2}) surrounding Laguna Lake at the head of the Los Osos Valley. It was bounded by a line through the Irish Hills on the southwest, a line bordering that of the Rancho Cañada de los Osos y Pecho y Islay on the northwest, a line running along the south slope of the Cerro San Luis Obispo to a point at the intersection of Elks Lane and Huigera Street on the northeast, and a line on the southeast to the starting point just south of the common boundary with the Ranchito de Santa Fe.

The Rancho was subsequently owned by W. H. Peterson and others up to 1883.

== Today ==
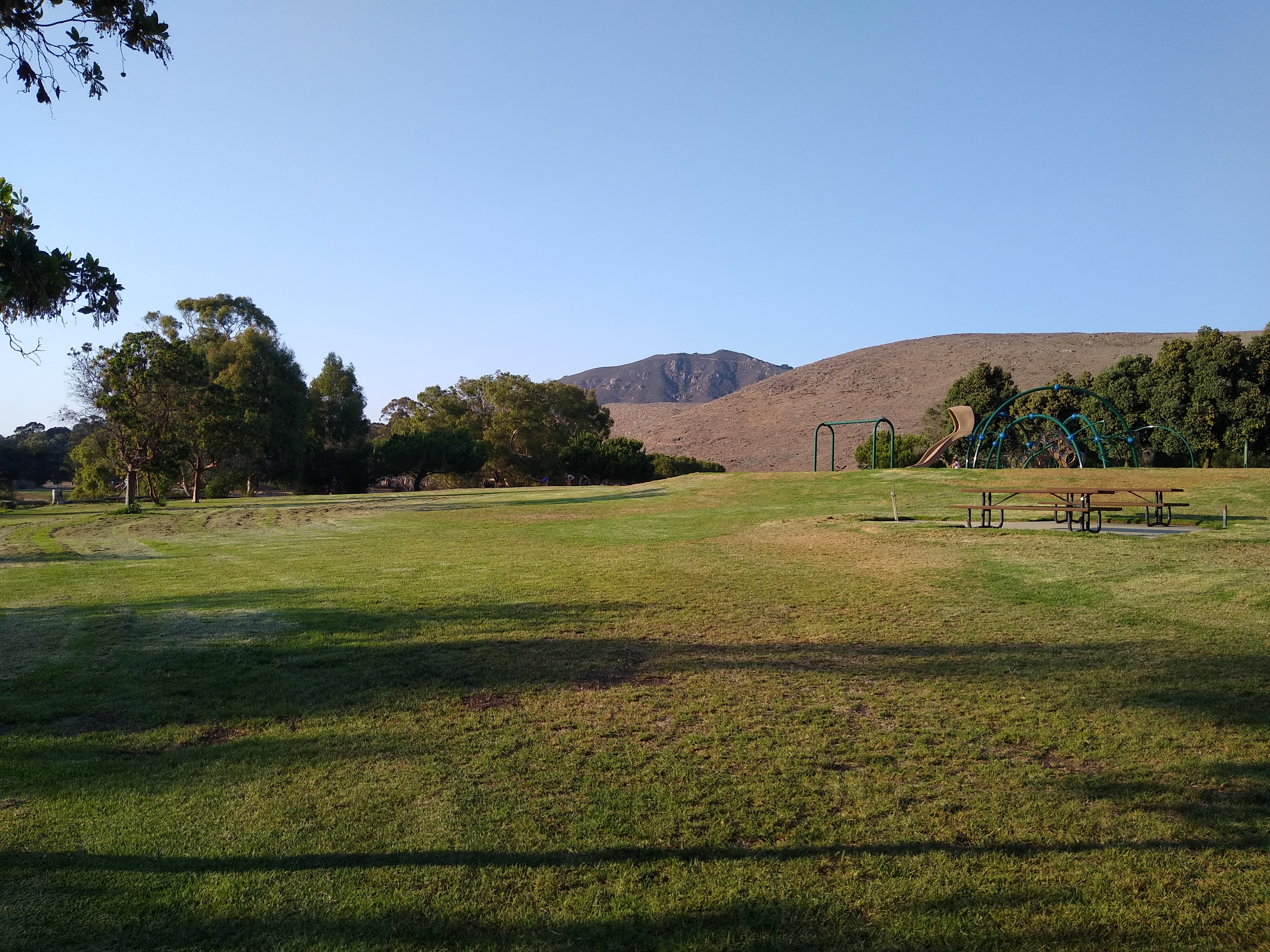
Laguna Lake Park in 2021

Most of the lands of the Rancho Laguna and all of the Laguna Lake are enclosed within the boundary of the City of San Luis Obispo, some parts of the land in the Irish Hills and to the east and northwest of the lake toward Bishop Peak are outside the city limits. Laguna Lake Park occupies the easternmost northeast shore of Laguna Lake. With Laguna Lake Park, the Laguna Lake Natural Reserve encloses most of the shoreline of the lake and the lower reach of Prefumo Creek and its delta on the shore of the lake (following its diversion into the late 1950s), omitting only the northernmost area, called the Northwest Inlets. The reserve also encloses a strip of grasslands to the northeast of the lake to near the crest of the serpentine rock ridgeline.
