= See Canyon =

See Canyon is a valley in San Luis Obispo County, California. It has its source at 35°15′09″N 120°46′16″W at an elevation of 960 feet (290 meters) in the Irish Hills. Its mouth lies at an elevation of 33 feet (10 meters), at its confluence with San Luis Obispo Creek.

== History ==
See Canyon originally San Miguelito Canyon, a Spanish name from which the name of the Rancho San Miguelito grant to Don Miguel Avila was derived. It was renamed for the pioneer family of Joseph See, who was:

"... a native of Kentucky, who moved to Indiana and from there to Texas, and thence to California, coming with ox teams over the southern route settling first in San Bernardino County. In 1860, he came with his family to San Luis Obispo County and bought land, which was named See Canyon after him. He [Joseph] farmed here for many years. He lived to be eighty eight years of age, and was a very influential and public-spirited man"

The 1860 Census of San Luis Obispo, lists Joseph See as a teamster worth $600.00 in personal property and landless. "Early grant records for the region show that See Canyon is one of the few areas not covered by an old Spanish grant and may have been public property. As a newcomer to the area, Joseph [See] may have homesteaded/squatted on that area, since no other land was available. Joseph's daughter Rachel and her husband William Calloway are known to have been long time residents of the Canyon and owned 160 acres (65 ha) of the Canyon."

Apples have been grown in See Canyon since at least 1916. Surrounded by mountainous terrain, the canyon is four miles (6.4 km) from the Pacific Coast with ideal conditions for growing apples and other fruit.
