= San Luis Obispo Bay =

Bay on the Pacific Ocean

Coordinates: 35°09′58″N 120°43′36″W

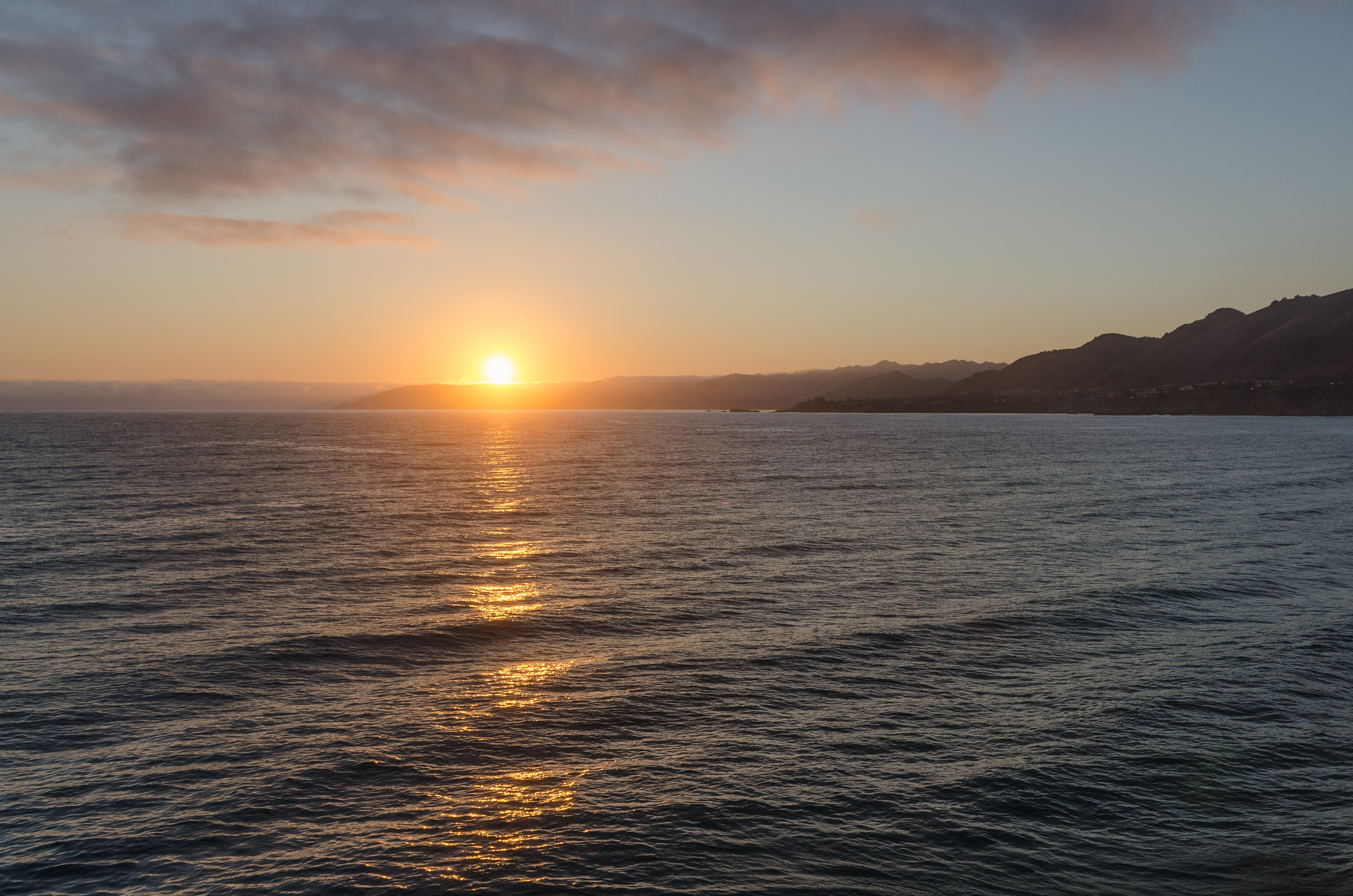

San Luis Obispo Bay is a bay on the Pacific Ocean coast of San Luis Obispo County, California, about 160 miles (257 km) northwest of Los Angeles, and about 200 miles (320 km) south of San Francisco. The bay is located between Point San Luis and the Shell Beach neighborhood of Pismo Beach. The community of Avila Beach is located on the bay. San Luis Obispo Creek has its mouth on the bay on the west side of Avila Beach.
