= Rancho San Miguelito =

Land grant in California

Coordinates: 35.200°N 120.710°W

Rancho San Miguelito was a 14,198-acre (57.46 km^{2}) Mexican land grant in present-day San Luis Obispo County, California, given in 1842 by Governor Juan Alvarado to Miguel Ávila, and an addition granted in 1846 by Governor Pio Pico. The grant extended along the Pacific coast, and included Point San Luis, San Luis Obispo Bay, and present day Avila Beach.

== History ==
Miguel Avila (1796 – 1874) was a son of Jose de Santa Ana Avila, a Spanish soldier stationed at the presidio of Santa Barbara. In 1816 Miguel Avila was in the Monterey company, and in 1824 he was corporal of the guard at Mission San Luis Obispo. In 1826 he was transferred to Monterey for quarreling with the mission priests. In Monterey, he married Maria Inocenta Pico (1810-), daughter of Jose Dolores Pico. Avila was granted Rancho San Miguelito in 1842. Miguel Avila was alcalde of San Luis Obispo in 1849.

With the cession of California to the United States following the Mexican-American War, the 1848 Treaty of Guadalupe Hidalgo provided that the land grants would be honored. A claim for Rancho San Miguelito, filed as required by the Land Act of 1851, with the Public Land Commission in 1852 was confirmed. Another claim by Miguel Avila for an addition to Rancho San Miguelito filed with the Land Commission in 1852 was also confirmed. A third claim by Miguel Avila for a two square league addition to Rancho San Miguelito filed with the Land Commission in 1852 was rejected. The grant was patented to Miguel Avila in 1877.

== Historic sites of the Rancho ==
San Luis Obispo Lighthouse

== See also ==
- Ranchos of California
- List of Ranchos of California
