= San Luis Obispo Creek =

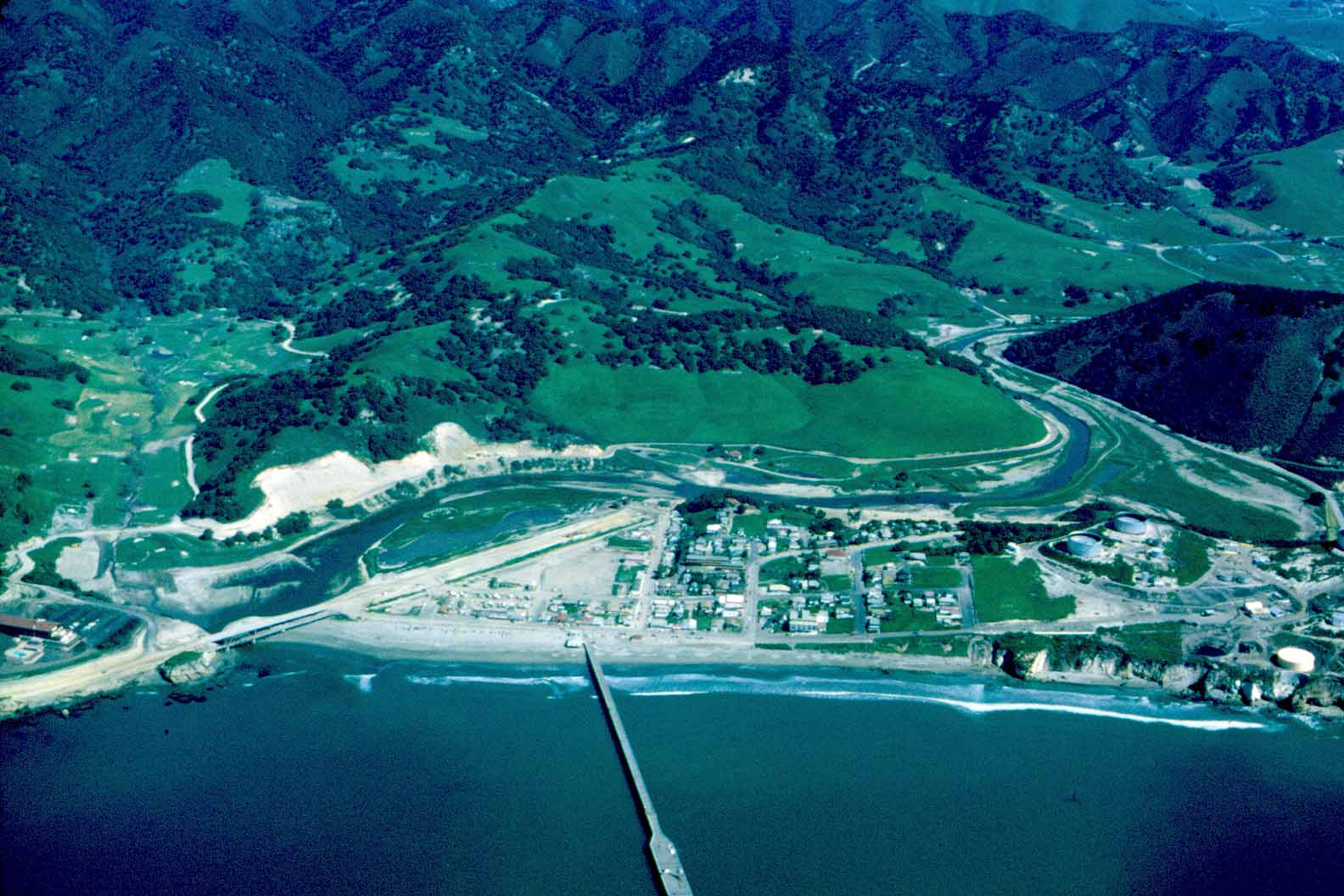
- San Luis Obispo Creek at Avila Beach, 1969

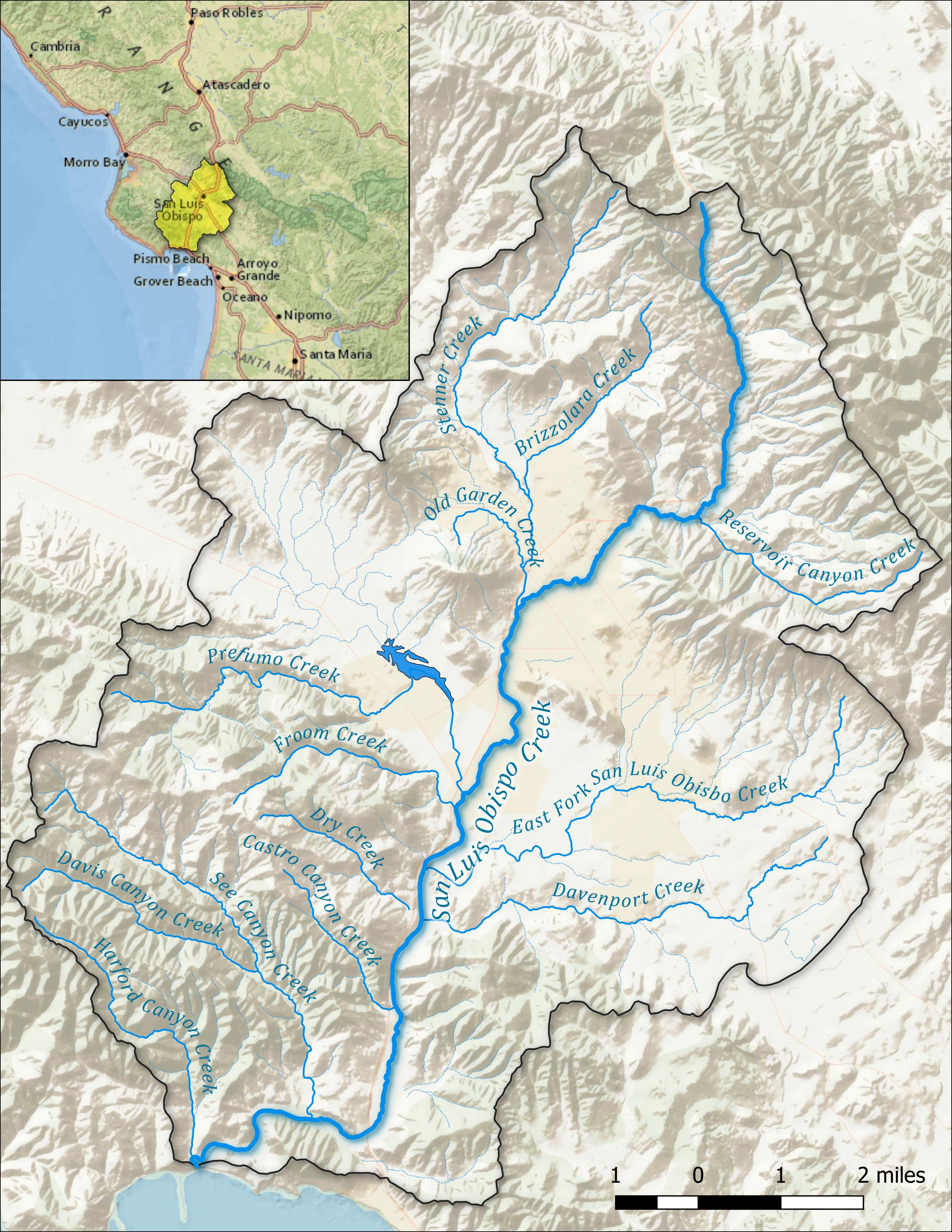
- San Luis Obispo Creek and significant tributaries

Location
- Country: United States
- State: California
- County: San Luis Obispo

Physical characteristics
- Source: Santa Lucia Mountains
  - coordinates: 35°20′56″N 120°37′52″W
  - elevation: 1,559 ft (475 m)
- Mouth: Pacific Ocean
  - location: Avila Beach
  - coordinates: 35°10′46″N 120°44′18″W
  - elevation: 0 ft (0 m)
- Length: 17.7 mi (28.5 km)
- Basin size: 84.8 mi^{2} (220 km^{2})

San Luis Obispo Creek is a stream, about 18 miles (29 km) long, in San Luis Obispo County, California. It drains a large coastal watershed that includes the city of San Luis Obispo, emptying into the Pacific Ocean at Avila Beach.

== Geography ==
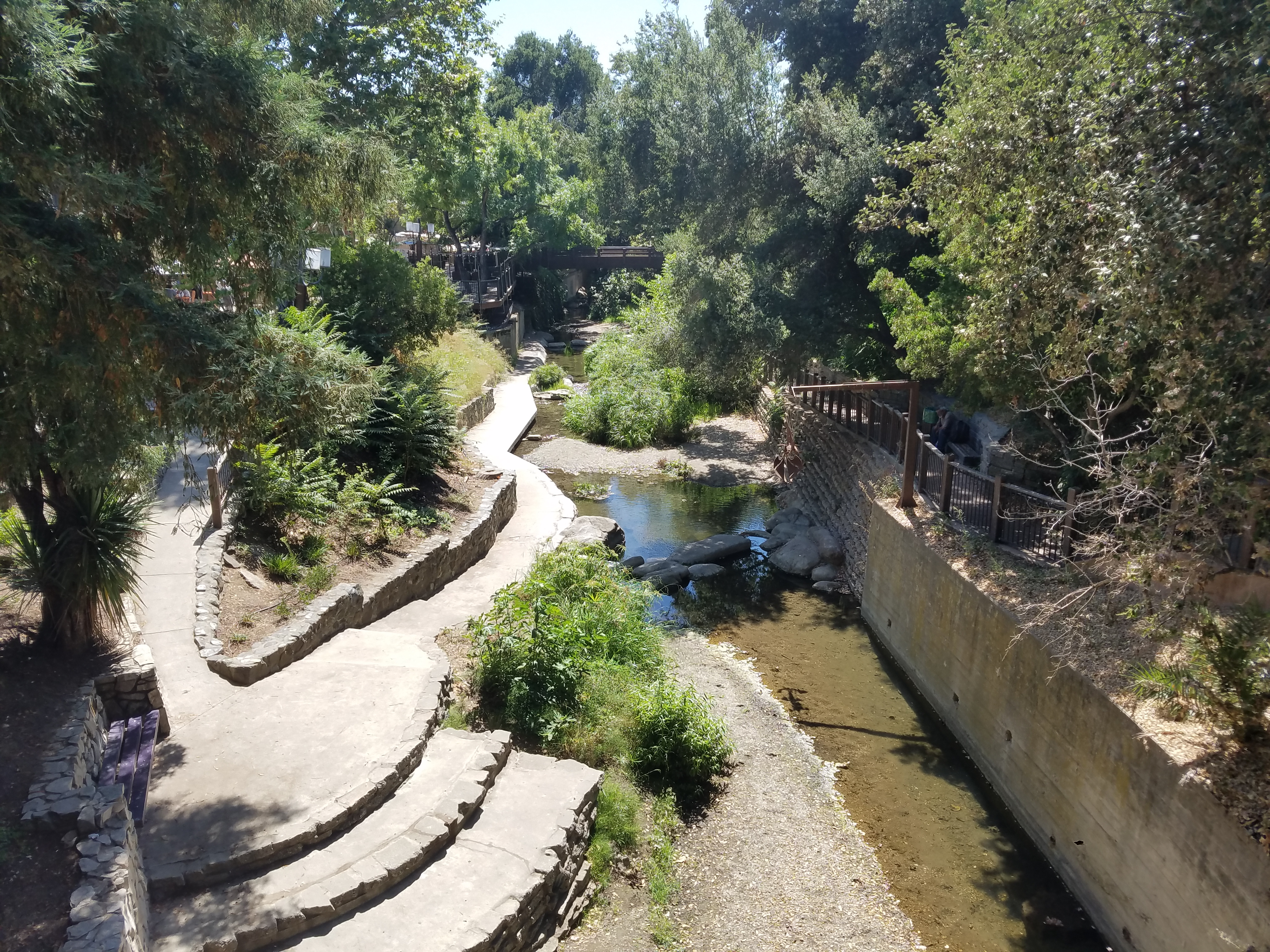
The creek as it flows past the Mission in downtown San Luis Obispo.

San Luis Obispo Creek begins in the Santa Lucia Mountains, at Cuesta Pass in the Los Padres National Forest. It flows south down a steep canyon below the Cuesta Grade of U.S. Highway 101 and turns to the west after receiving Reservoir Canyon Creek from the left. Entering the city of San Luis Obispo it turns southwest, flowing through residential areas and past San Luis Obispo High School. The creek flows in a man-made channel as it approaches downtown west of Johnson Avenue. At Osos Street it enters a concrete tunnel about 1,000 feet (300 m) long passing beneath downtown San Luis Obispo. After emerging from the tunnel it flows past Mission San Luis Obispo de Tolosa, and then receives Stenner Creek from the right just upstream of Marsh Street.

Below Marsh Street, the creek flows south in a natural channel along the east side of Highway 101, then flows through industrial areas and farmland in the southern part of the city. Near Los Osos Valley Road, it receives Prefumo Creek and Froom Creek from the right, before leaving the city limits of San Luis Obispo. It enters a canyon along the east side of the Irish Hills, receiving the East Fork of San Luis Obispo Creek and Davenport Creek from the left, then turns sharply to the west, leaving the route of US 101, and receives See Canyon Creek from the right. Approaching its mouth, the creek forms a small estuary before emptying into the Pacific Ocean at San Luis Obispo Bay, just west of Avila Beach.

== Watershed ==
The San Luis Obispo Creek watershed covers 84.8 square miles (220 km^{2}). Most of the watershed consists of rangeland and open space, with some farmland and orchards. About 11 percent of the watershed, mostly in the city of San Luis Obispo, is urbanized. The watershed experiences a moderately wet Mediterranean climate, with a mean annual rainfall of 24 to 29 inches (610 to 740 mm).

The East Fork of San Luis Obispo Creek is the largest sub-basin, and drains most of the southern part of the city of San Luis Obispo. Stenner Creek, the second largest sub-basin, drains northern San Luis Obispo and includes the tributaries Brizzolara Creek and Old Garden Creek. Brizzolara Creek flows through the Cal Poly campus. The third largest sub-basin, Prefumo Creek, drains Laguna Lake, one of the only natural lakes in San Luis Obispo County, as well as much of the Irish Hills Natural Reserve and the eastern end of Los Osos Valley.

Localized flooding is an issue in the city of San Luis Obispo.

== Ecology ==
North American beaver (Castor canadensis) have been thought to be non-native to San Luis Obispo Creek but Bolton recorded in "Anza's California Expeditions" that in April 1774, Father Cavaller of Mission San Luis Obispo de Tolosa gave Juan Bautista de Anza "thirty-odd beaver skins" along with other local gifts including fine Indian baskets and "the skins of eight bears, the animals for which the region was renowned".

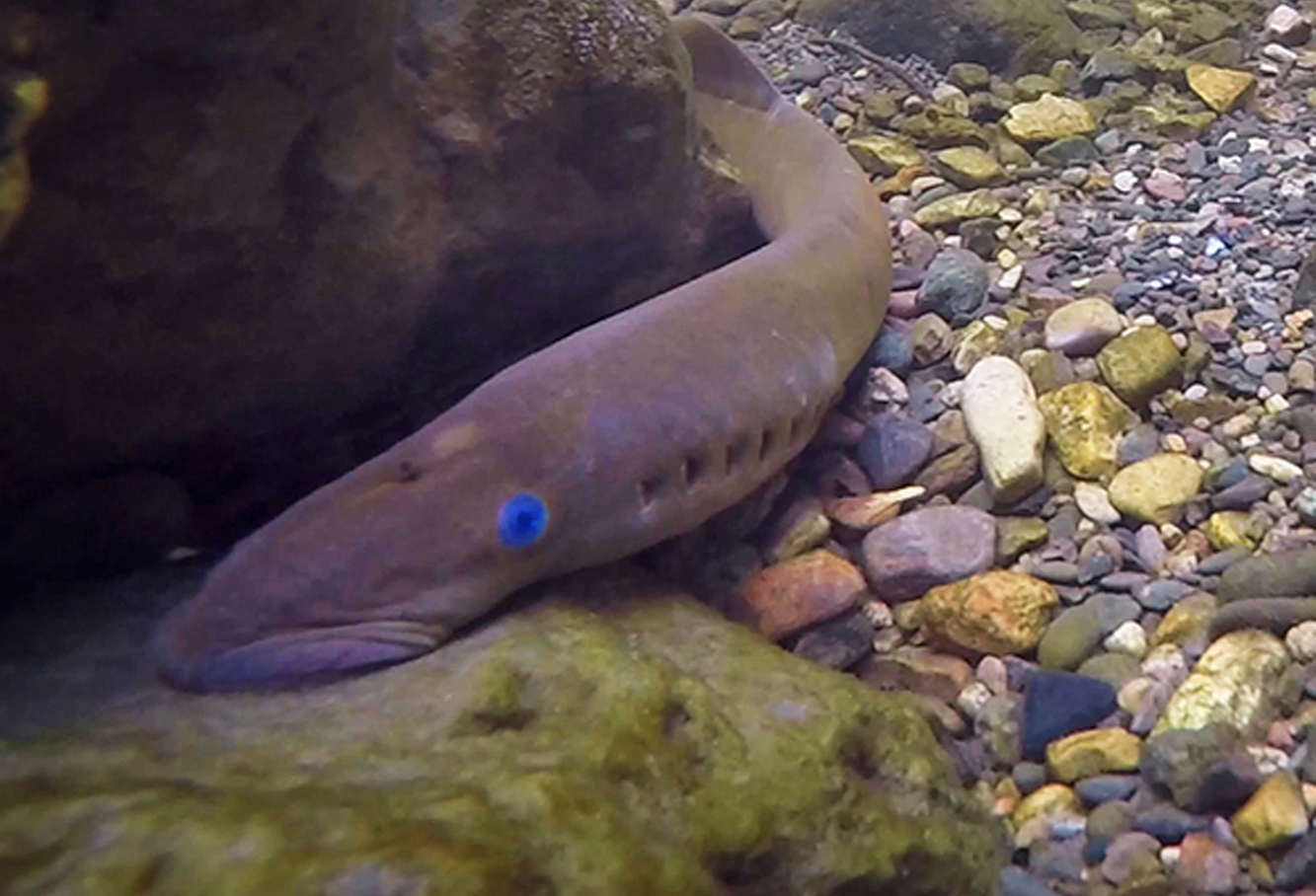
An adult Pacific lamprey (Entosphenus tridentatus) attached to a rock in San Luis Obispo Creek. The species returned to the creek in 2017 after a six-year absence.

Various barriers to fish migration have been created on San Luis Obispo Creek and its tributaries, since the city of San Luis Obispo developed. Stage Coach Dam on the upper reaches of the creek was removed in 2002. It had been built in the early 1900s to create a water supply reservoir, but was filled in with sediment. Other barriers have been removed as well, often by creating notches in the middle to concentrate low flows or adding rock weirs to back up the water over an obstacle or provide a more gradual change in elevation. In 2017, Pacific lampreys (Entosphenus tridentatus) returned to the creek after a six-year absence.

== See also ==
- List of rivers of California
