= San Luis Ranch =

Coordinates: 35°15′22″N 120°40′45″W

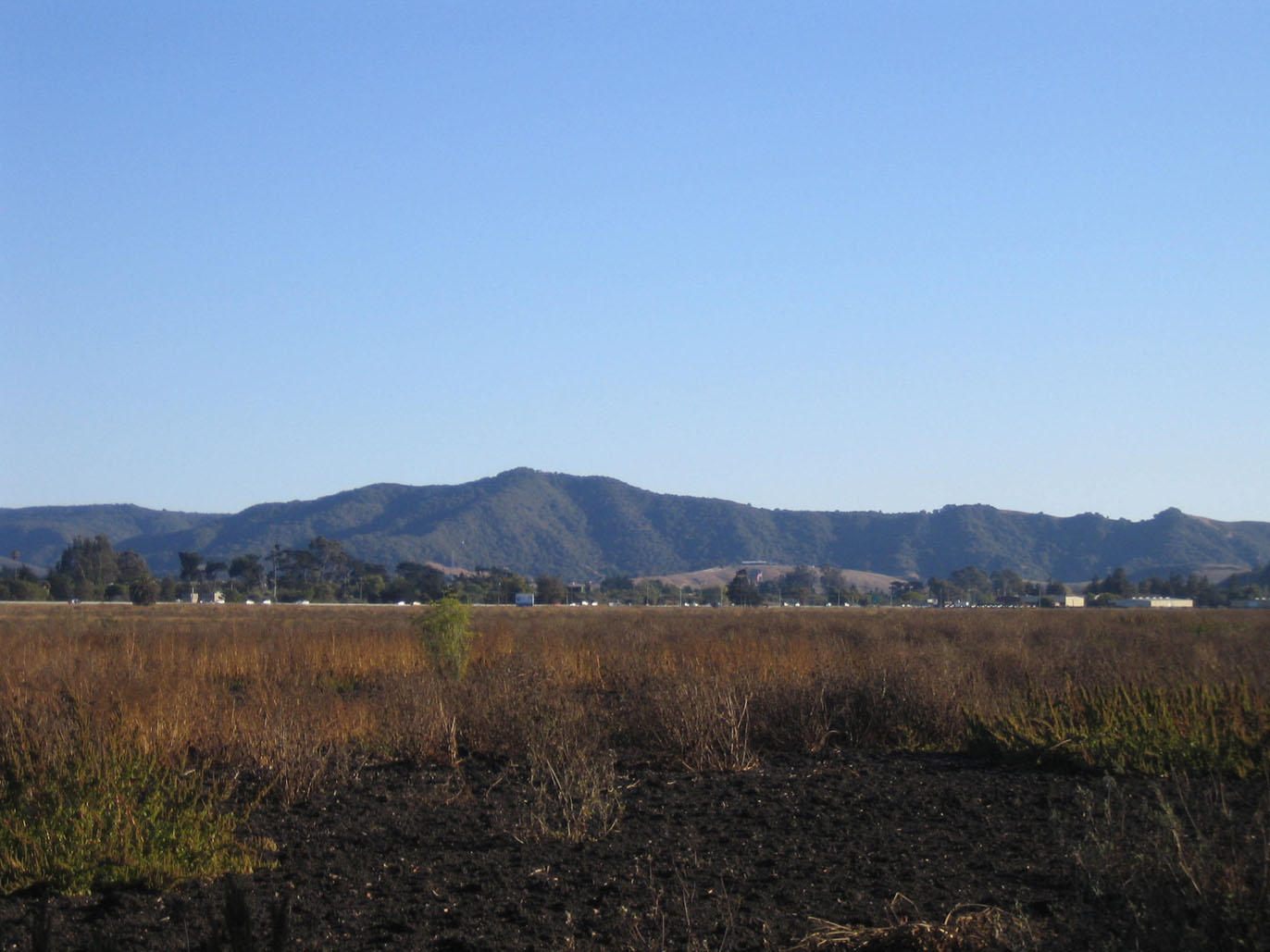
San Luis Ranch

San Luis Ranch is a 131-acre development project (53 ha) in San Luis Obispo, California, United States. Forty acres (16 ha) of the project includes up to 580 homes along with another 60 acres (24 ha) of organic farming and open space. The project includes 200,000 square feet of commercial space, 150,000 square feet of office space and a 200-room hotel. The former farmland is west of U.S. Route 101, and east of Madonna Road. The parcel is south of the Promenade Shopping Center and bordered by Prefumo Creek. The plans include an overpass connecting U.S. Route 101 and Prado Road. The Dalidio Ranch Project was formerly proposed for the site and was the subject of Measure J, which was voted on the November 7, 2006, ballot. Ernie Dalidio was the former owner of Dalidio Ranch who sold the property in 2013.

== History ==
=== Dalidio property ===
The Dalidio Ranch property has been owned by the Dalidio family since the early 1900s. Ernie Dalidio's grandparents, Forino and Katie Dalidio, were the first to develop the land by drilling wells, building a farmhouse, and cultivating the fields. During the 1920s, the Dalidios drilled five wells on the land, which effectively supplied the entire city of San Luis Obispo with water until the conclusion of World War II. In 1952, Ernie Dalidio inherited the land from his father, and Ernie continued to cultivate it until 1997, when he claimed that it was "no longer realistic to farm land hemmed in by shopping centers and subdivisions." Ernie Dalidio went to the San Luis Obispo City Council for the first time in 1991 to petition for permission to develop his property. In 1994, Ernie's proposal was met with approval by San Luis Obispo's city council, after a compromise was arranged, leaving one half of the proposed land for open agricultural space.

=== Chronology of events ===
- 1991 – Ernie Dalidio proposed development of one half of his land instead of his original plans for total development, due to recommendation from San Luis Obispo City Council.
- 1994 – San Luis Obispo City Council decided that commercial growth should be allowed as infill on half of Dalidio's property. Government planners called for half the Dalidio property to be preserved as open space. This decision marked the commencement of the Dalidio Marketplace initiative.
- February 2001 – City Council denied the Dalidio Marketplace proposal. Ernie Dalidio decided to propose a broader initiative to San Luis Obispo County.
- 2002 – The San Luis Obispo City Council urged the County board to relinquish the initiative to the City's jurisdiction. The San Luis Obispo County agreed to release their jurisdiction on the matter.
- July 2004 – San Luis Obispo Downtown Association, an advisory board to San Luis Obispo's city council, opposed Dalidio's proposed Marketplace shopping center, despite San Luis Obispo City Council's vote to approve the project.
- 2005 – San Luis Obispo city voters rejected the Marketplace Project: Measure A and B rejected by 51 percent of voters and Measure C rejected by 52 percent of voters.
- March 2006 – Dalidio came up with revised "Dalidio Ranch Project" with the intention of letting the residents of San Luis Obispo County vote to decide the project's fate. This revision was submitted to the county as Measure J.
- November 2006 – 65% of San Luis Obispo County voters approved Measure J.
- December 2007 – Lowe's starts thinking of not being in the Dalidio Ranch project. Dalidio has claimed Target, Lowe's, and Macy's as possible candidates for the project. It is possible that if Lowe's leaves the project, then Macy's could be the second anchor which would change the power center (big-box shopping center) into a regional mall to meet Macy's Incorporated building requirements.
- February 2007 – Lawsuits were filed against the approved proposition for Dalidio Ranch Project, with claims that citizens do not have the rights to agricultural decisions through political initiatives.
- February 2008 – Judge Roger Picquet overturned the approved proposition, stating "[Measure J] is not a proper subject for an initiative because the approval of the particular development project... is an adjudicatory and not a pure legislative act." This meant Judge Picquet ruled that the initiative was a matter to be decided by the city's Superior Court, not by the county or city electorate.
- April 2008 – Target and Macy's (possible candidates in Dalidio's project) have confirmed not to leave his project to any of Madonna Enterprise's properties.
- August 4, 2009 – The 2nd Court of Appeal in Ventura, CA overturns SLO County Judge Piquet's ruling, reinstating the validity of Measure J. The ruling also reopened the possibility of Dalidio refiling a RICO lawsuit against the SLO city Downtown Association (DTA) and the secretive LLC, Citizens for Planning Responsibly (CPR).

== Projects ==
=== Dalidio Ranch Initiative Measure, Measure J-06 ===
Measure J was an initiative representing Ernie Dalidio's second attempt to develop his land. This measure will determine whether the San Luis Obispo County General Plan, Title 22, and official maps will have to be amended. If approved, Measure J will add provisions to the General Plan, creating a specific zoning area intended to comply with the Dalidio land use. Also, the property owner, Ernie Dalidio, will be given exclusive rights to fund and develop his building project and exclude the County from any decision making regarding the development of the property. The initiative also states that permitted uses of the property may include retail, corporate business, residential, recreation and open space. However, the project and initiative do not solely focus on new development. The existing on-site barn and Victorian farm house will be relocated to a separate location on the Dalidio property as well. These structures will be rehabilitated and made accessible to the public. Many "conditions of approval" have been created as a result of the proponents of the measure. In these conditions, it is stated that four million dollars, which would otherwise be applied to design, will be conditionally applied to the construction of a Highway 101 overpass at Prado Road.

If the measure passes, it will be exempt from all County ordinances, guidelines, and regulations. In addition, all codes surrounding regulation and land use, including Title 22 and Title 26, the Growth Management Ordinance, may be ignored upon passing of the measure. In short, Ernie Dalidio will have free rein over the planning and development of his land without required approval from County officials. Voting yes on Measure J will allow the amendment of the General Plan and development of the Dalidio property for mixed uses described in detail in the measure. Voting no on Measure J will prevent the amendment of the General Plan and development of the Dalidio Property for mixed uses described in detail in the measure.

==== Pros of Measure J ====
San Luis Obispo citizens in favor of Measure J support the development of the proposed marketplace on the Dalidio property. Supporters believe the 131-acre (53 ha) parcel of farmland is no longer productive because it is surrounded by commercial property and the 101 freeway. They believe that the development of the marketplace will create more job opportunities for the San Luis Obispo area and help generate funds to finance a substantial portion of the planned Prado Road overpass. Without development of the Dalidio Ranch there will be no available private funds to build the Prado Road overpass, and the project will be more costly to build. Also, it is believed that tax revenues generated from Dalidio Ranch development will benefit the San Luis Obispo County, whereas much of the revenue currently goes to Santa Barbara County. The proposed project has completed two Environmental Impact Reports and has already met the environmental standards outlined in the development plan.

Many San Luis Obispo citizens also support the many biological enhancements that will be included within the development. For example, the project would farm native plants and will refrain from developing on sensitive wetland and riparian habitats on the property. The "green", or environmentally friendly, features in the project will include: a monarch butterfly natural habitat preserve and viewing area, a mile-long bike path, a seven-day-a-week farmers' market, a 13.3-acre (5.4 ha) organic farm, a blue heron nesting habitat preserve, Perfumo Creek Open Space corridor, construction waste recycling, more than 650 trees (many selected for shadow size), dark sky at night-minimum allowable nighttime light levels per safety regulations, energy-efficient energy production including solar panels on some of the buildings, and water efficiency through the use of native plants where practical. The San Luis Obispo City Council originally voted in favor of the project, as did 65% of citizens. Supporters believe that the fate of the Dalidio Ranch should be in the hands of San Luis Obispo citizens, and most of all the property owner, Ernie Dalidio.

==== Cons of Measure J ====
Opponents of Measure J argue that developing the 131 acres (53 ha) of land would further change the agricultural, small-town feel of San Luis Obispo by further engulfing the city with big businesses. They believe this would create income deficits for the small businesses in downtown San Luis Obispo, and only serve to build duplicates of large retailers already built in the county. They argue that the creation of a freeway overpass connecting Prado Road with Madonna Road will add an estimated 30,000 additional car trips per day, resulting in Highway 101 Traffic Gridlock due to the higher volume of vehicles on the road. They claim the overpass will also collectively cost taxpayers millions in roadwork as well as flood-control projects. Measure J opposition argues that the funds allocated to the Dalidio Ranch project will impact regional funding for other projects in the county such as roadwork on Highways 46 and 101, Brisco Road, and Willow Road. Those who reject the Measure J proposal do so with the belief that giving the San Luis Obispo County electorate the right to decide the future of the local agricultural community sets a dangerous precedent, as few residents have the ability to make well-educated decisions regarding zoning and development planning for San Luis Obispo.

==== Court ruling of February 1, 2008 ====
On February 1, 2008, San Luis Obispo Superior Court Judge Roger Picquet overturned Measure J, which was passed by voters on a previous ballot in 2006. He ruled that Measure J "is not a proper subject for an initiative because the approval of the particular development project…is an adjudicatory and not a pure legislative act." The judge decided that the proposed project site is within the San Luis Obispo's airport land-use area and interferes with the State Aeronautics Act, which requires local airports to establish plans for safety around airfields. The development of Measure J is now at a halt, and the county is not permitted to process any applications to implement the project any further at this time.

==== Court ruling of August 4, 2009 ====
The 2nd Court of Appeal in Ventura, CA overturned Judge Piquet's February 2008 ruling on a 3–0 vote, reinstating the validity of [Measure J]. In its ruling, the court opined, "… our review of this appeal is also strictly circumscribed by the long-established rule of according extraordinarily broad deference to the electorate's power to enact laws by initiative. The state constitutional right of initiative or referendum is 'one of the most precious rights of democratic process.' These powers are reserved to the people, not granted to them. Thus, it is our duty to 'jealously guard' these powers."

This court decision also gave Dalidio the option of refiling a RICO lawsuit against the San Luis Obispo Downtown Association (DTA) as well as the LLC, Citizens for Planning Responsibly (CPR), that vigorously opposed Measure J and filed the lawsuits to overturn it.

The appellate court ruled that Measure J was legislative and not adjudicative, and decided that the airport land use issue is "without merit." Other arguments against Dalidio were summarily disposed.

== Sale of property ==
On May 25, 2013, the San Luis Obispo Tribune reported that the Dalidio Ranch property was in escrow for sale to a private group of investors. The 131-acre site (53 ha) was listed for sale at a listing price of $19,750,000. Local developer Gary Grossman purchased the property and anticipated a speedy approval process to final development.

== Primary references ==
1. "Measure J Initiative." http://www.slocounty.ca.gov/Assets/CR/Elections/November+7$!2c+2006+general+election/Full+text+Measure+j-06.pdf
2. Taking Issue, from planning to traffic, Measure J passes the tests." San Lucian 2006 4. 02 Mar 2008.
3. Connel, Sally. "It's Back to the Table for City, County and Dalidio – SLO Councilman says He'd Like to Revive some Arrangement of the Failed Marketplace Project" The Tribune. 19 Jul 2007. 01 Mar 2008.
4. "Measure A, B, and C Initiatives." 3 March 2008. https://web.archive.org/web/20110716141306/http://www.slocity.org/cityclerk/specialelection2005/Final%20Sample%20Ballot%20%26%20Voter%20Information%20Pamphlet.pdf
5. County of San Luis Obispo Impartial Analysis of Measure J-06." 3 March 2008. http://www.nomeasurej.org/supporting-documents/official-ballot-materials
