= Laguna Lake (San Luis Obispo, California) =

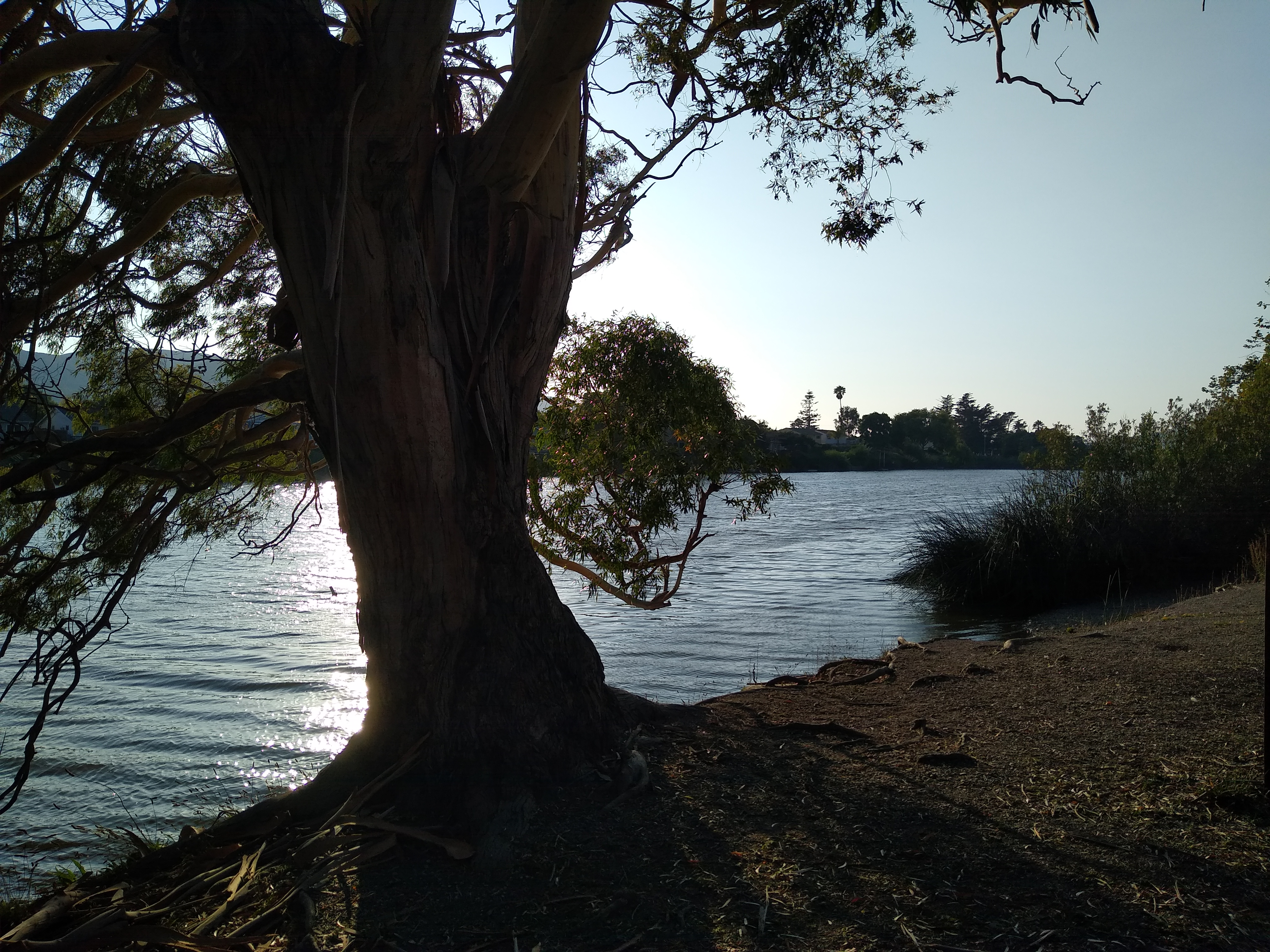

- Location within California
- Location: San Luis Obispo County
- Coordinates: 35°15′59″N 120°41′30″W
- Type: reservoir
- Primary inflows: Prefumo Creek
- Primary outflows: San Luis Obispo Creek
- Surface elevation: 121 feet (37 m)

Laguna Lake is a lake and seasonal reservoir in the upper Los Osos Valley, in San Luis Obispo, California. It lies at an elevation 121 feet (37 m). It is supplied with water from various small watercourses from the surrounding valley but especially by Prefumo Creek a tributary of San Luis Obispo Creek that enters the lake at 35°15′51″N 120°41′32″W. The Lake is also drained by Prefumo Creek at from its eastern end at 35°15′35″N 120°41′01″W that drains to San Luis Obispo Creek.

== History ==
The Rancho Laguna a section of Mission San Luis Obispo lands originally enclosed the lake.

== Gallery ==
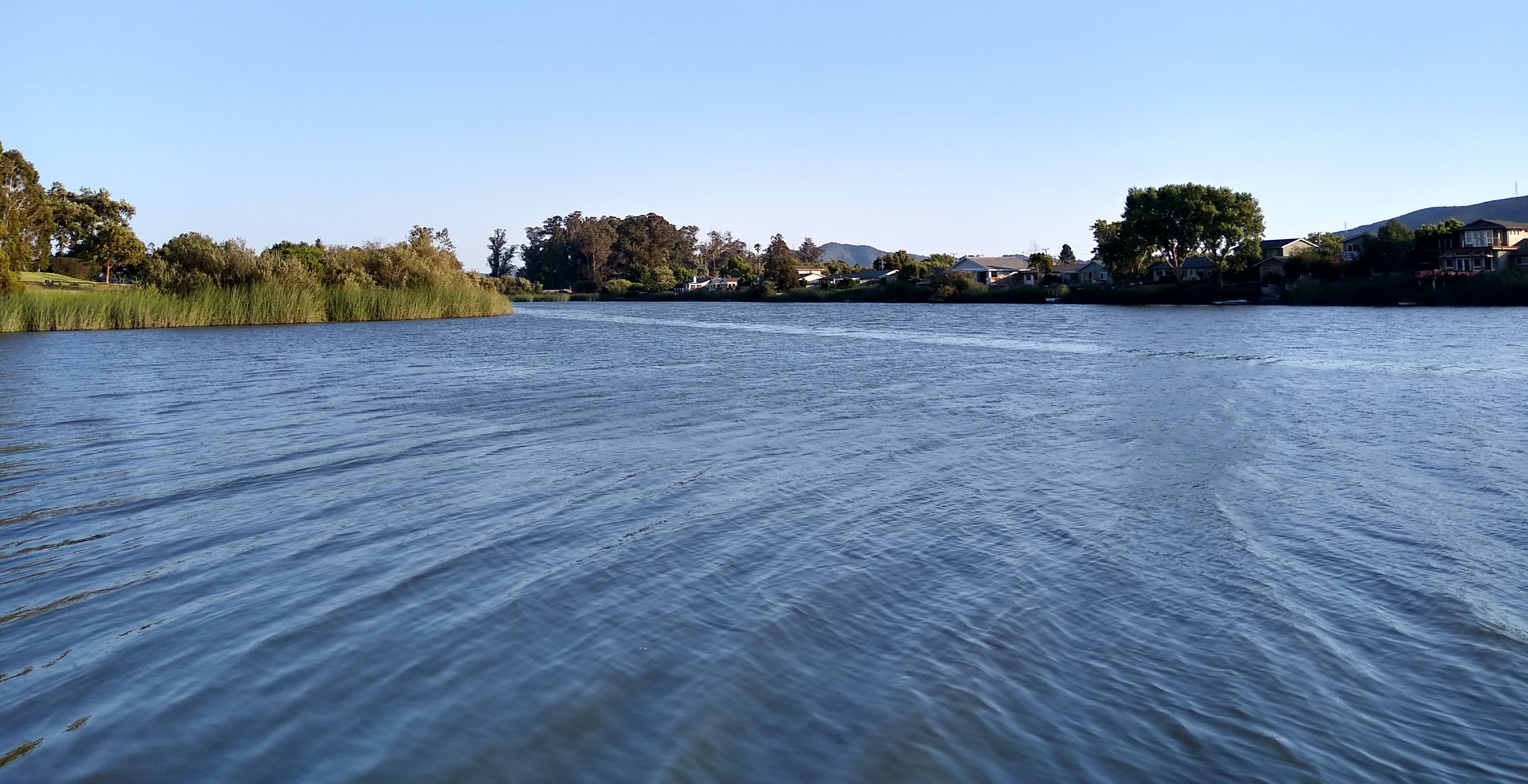

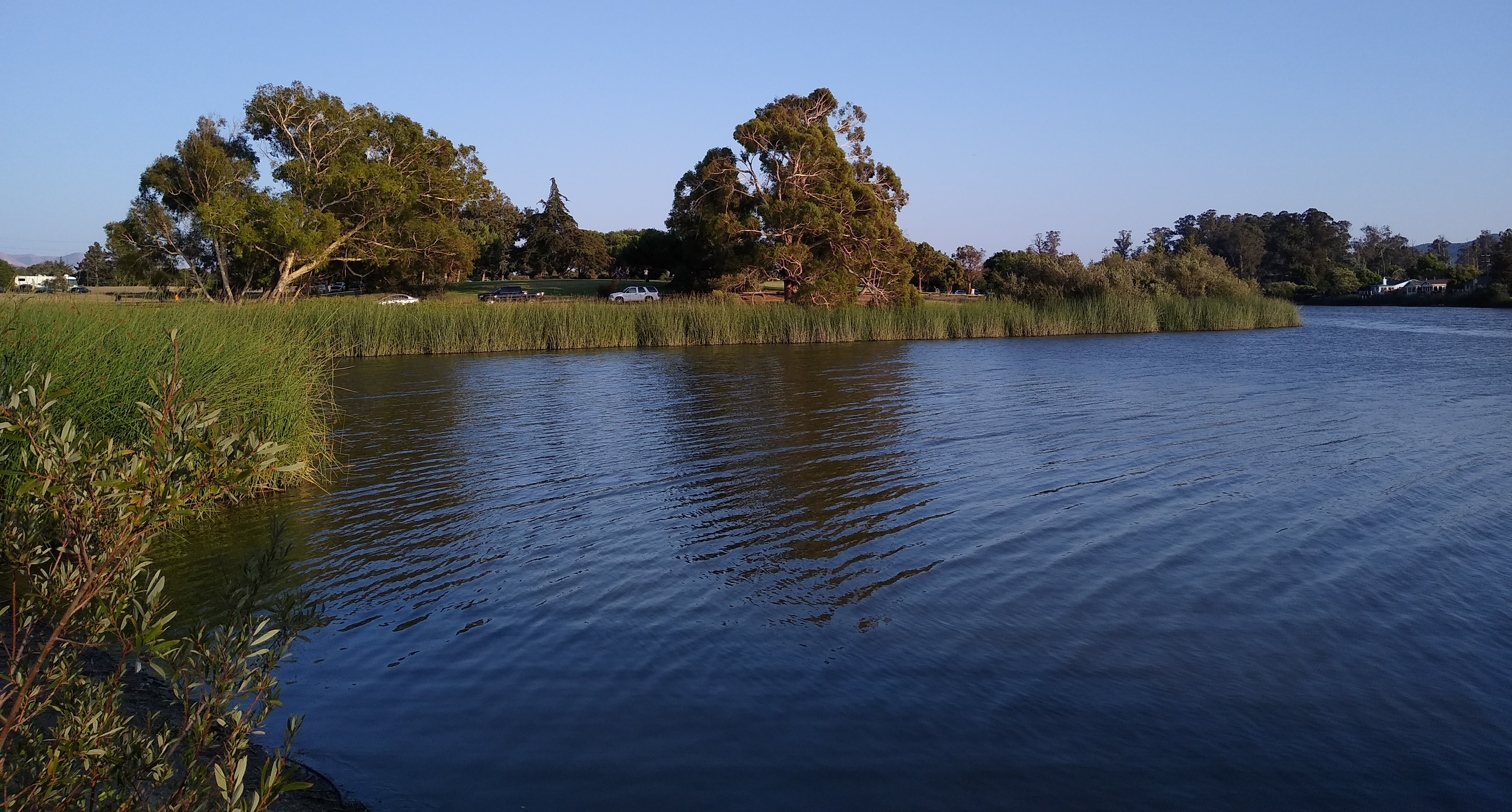
