= Port San Luis =

Coordinates: 35.1719°N 120.7560°W

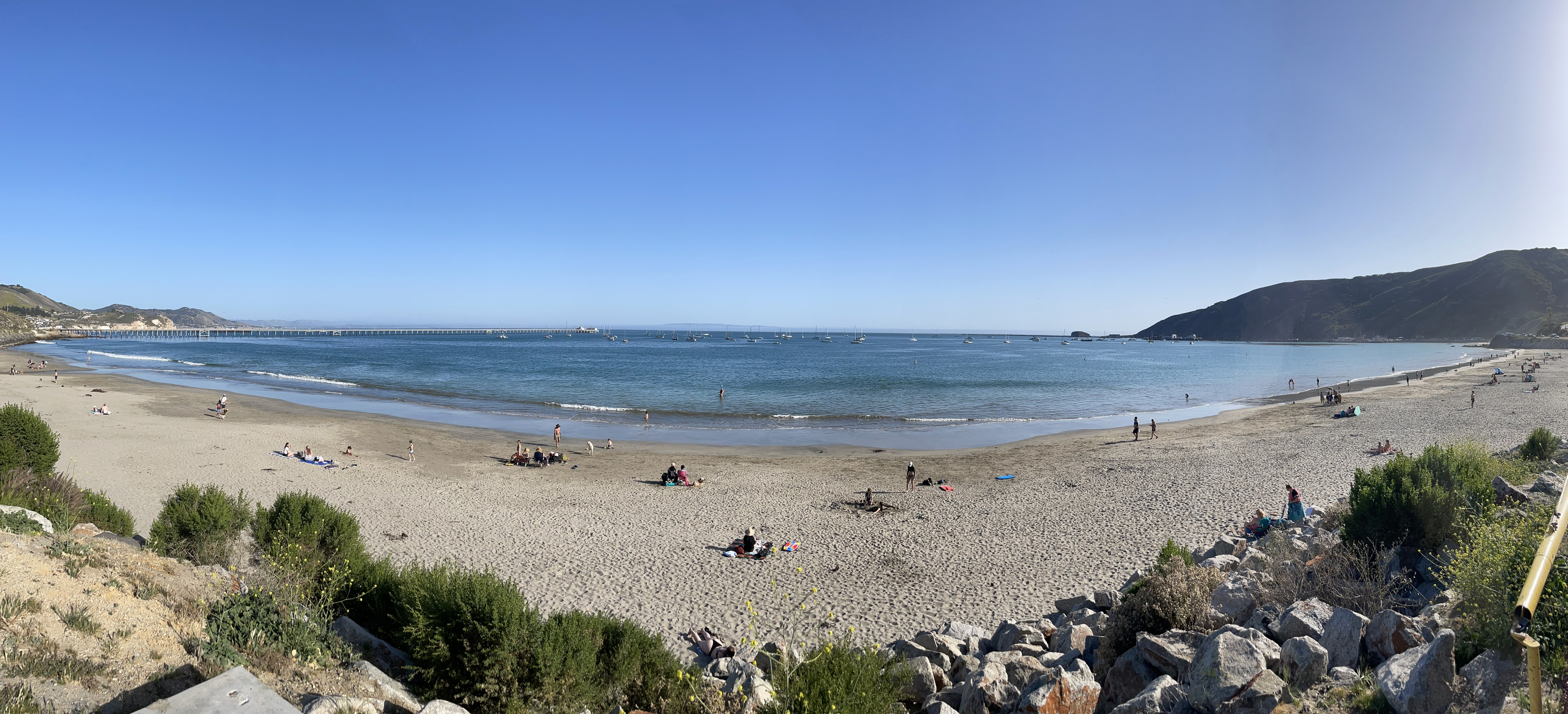
- Interactive map of Port San Luis

Location
- Country: United States
- Location: Avila Beach, California

Details
- Opened: 1873
- Owned by: Port San Luis Harbor District
- Type of harbour: coastal breakwater

Statistics
- Website https://www.portsanluis.com/

Port San Luis is a harbor on the central coast of California, approximately 1.3 miles (2.1 km) west of Avila Beach in San Luis Obispo County. The harbor is managed by the Port San Luis Harbor District which is responsible for maintaining the surrounding tidelands and beaches. Originally acting as a major port for oil exports, the harbor serves as a recreational area and is used by boaters and researchers to study and appreciate the local marine life.

== History ==
In 1873 John Harford constructed the Harford pier to allow for the shipment of goods and passengers to nearby San Luis Obispo. The pier was connected to a railroad and, by the late 1870s, included a hotel for passengers waiting to embark on ships arriving at the pier. In the late 1800s, construction began on a breakwater that extended southeast from the point to provide further protection for the pier. By 1890, the Point San Luis Lighthouse was constructed on a bluff above the point.

In 1910 Union Oil began using the port to export oil extracted from the San Joaquin Valley. This new trade led to the construction of additional piers and railroads, with oil exports continuing to expand well into the 1920s. With the onset of the Great Depression oil exports ceased and the port fell into disuse, with Harford pier being demolished. With the arrival of World War II, the port became important once again, acting as a supplying station for U.S. naval vessels.

In 1954 voters in San Luis Obispo County, California approved the creation of a harbor district to conserve and maintain the port's facilities and its surrounding tidelands. In 1955, the California State Legislature granted the harbor district the surrounding tidelands in trust. In 1984, the Legislature also granted the district a trust over Avila Beach.

The port was suggested as the assembly area for the windmill parts for the proposed offshore wind energy sites located between 20 and 30 miles (32 and 48 km) off the coast near Morro Bay.

== Features ==
The harbor is a mooring point for recreational sailing and fishing boats. Visitors are also able to camp both at and near the port in recreational vehicles. The port also has a multi-purpose room and a boat repair shop. One restaurant is at the end of the pier, and another is by the parking lot.

A dog-friendly beach, the Olde Port Beach is just to the east. Due to its proximity to the port, this beach is less suitable for water sports than the main beach of Avila Beach.

The Pecho Coast Trail connects the Port San Luis to the Point San Luis Lighthouse. The trail's starting point is near the corner of Diablo Canyon Road and Avila Beach Drive. A docent is required for the hike.

The Center for Coastal Marine Sciences of nearby California Polytechnic State University, San Luis Obispo has a pier used as a research and educational facility .
