= Paso Robles Hot Springs =

Thermal spring system in California

- Paso Robles Mud Bath Springs
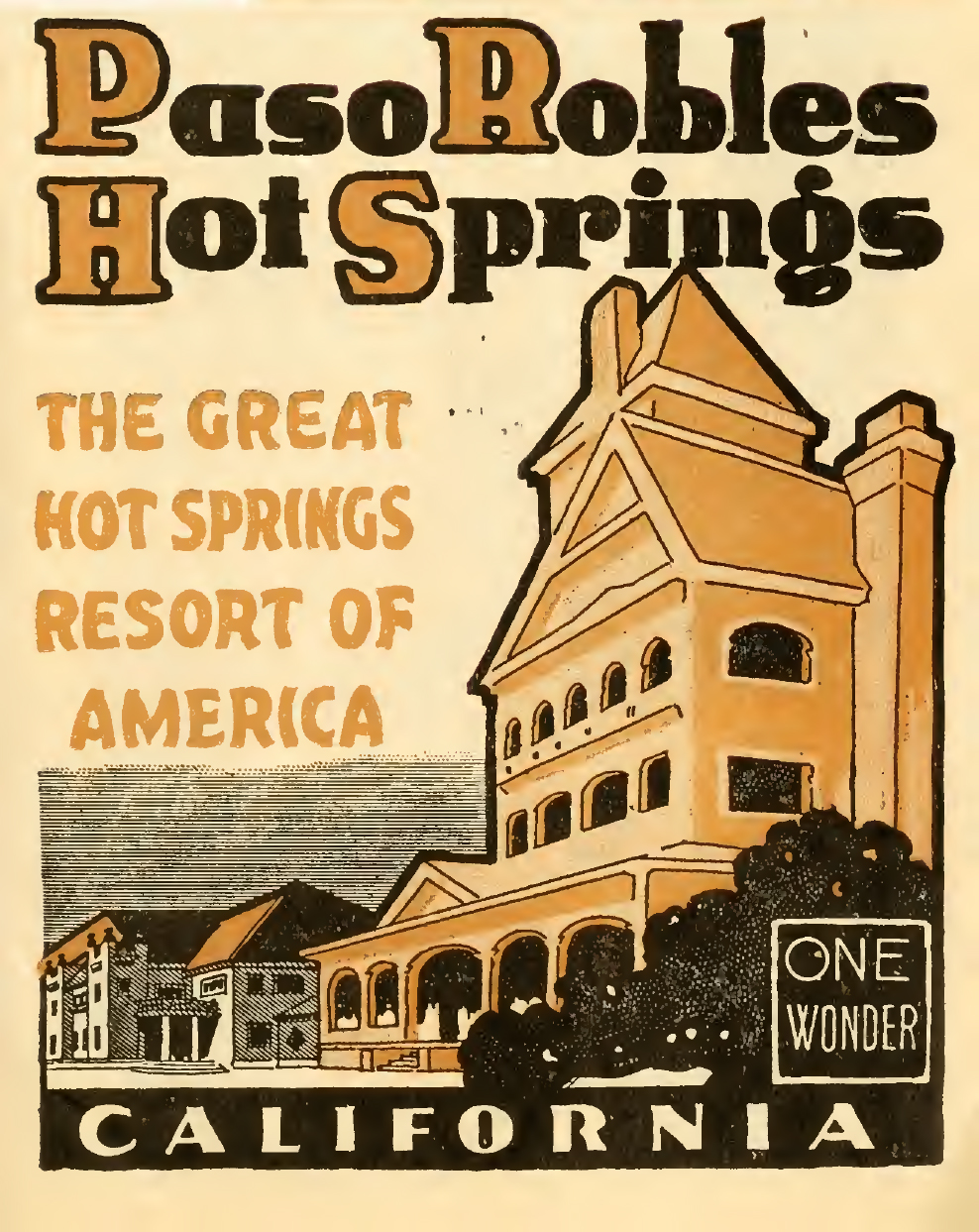
- Historic brochure for Paso Robles Hot Springs, c. 1910
- Interactive map of Paso Robles Hot Springs
- Location: Paso Robles, California
- Coordinates: 35°37′32″N 120°41′29″W
- Elevation: 223 metres (732 ft)
- Type: geothermal
- Temperature: 117 °F (47 °C)

Paso Robles Hot Springs is a system of geothermal hot springs in the area of Paso Robles in San Luis Obispo County, California. They were developed in the late 19th and early 20th century.

== History ==
For thousands of years before settlers arrived in California, the area was inhabited by the Indigenous Salinan peoples.

There are records by Spanish explorers that the hot springs and hot mud deposits were used by the local Indigenous peoples. As long ago as 1795, Paso Robles has been described as "California's oldest watering place", as a place with plentiful hot sulphur springs and natural mud baths. During the Mission period in California, there were mineral baths built by Franciscan priests at the nearby San Miguel Mission. As more settlers were attracted to the area, cattle ranches, vineyards and fruit and nut orchards were established. The first mineral spring bath house, the El Paso de Robles Hotel, was built in the town of Paso Robles in 1864.

The hot springs are located on the Paso Robles Rancho land grant property that was owned by Petronilo Rios. The 26,000-acre rancho property was then sold in 1857 to two brothers from Kentucky, Daniel and James Blackburn, and their friend, Lazarus Godchaux. Daniel took the portion of the property with the hot springs (where the townsite was eventually built), whereas James preferred the open grazing lands. In 1860, Drury Woodson James, who happened to be the uncle of Frank and Jesse James purchased a tract of land nearby and in 1869, purchased a portion of the townsite of Paso Robles from the Blackburn brothers. The three men then formed a partnership in 1873, called Blackburn Bros. & James, Owners & Proprietors.

By 1868, travelers were already arriving from Nevada, Oregon, and Idaho to visit the mud baths and the Sand Spring and Iron Spring at Paso Robles. In 1882, the two published an advertising brochure titled, El Paso de Robles Hot and Cold Sulphur Springs and the Only Natural Mud Baths in the World. In 1888, a 37-room bathhouse was built over the hot sulphur springs, along with a plunge. The following year, construction began on the Hot Springs Hotel (later known as the Paso Robles Inn), with completion of the structure in 1900.

In 1904 the Paso Robles Hot Sulphur Company was formed by 12 investors to build a bathhouse for locals and to develop a spa for tourists and guests. In 1910 a brochure was published called, Paso Robles Hot Springs; the great hot springs resort of America by the Southern Pacific Railroad Company. In 1913, the Inn burned down. The following year, in 1914, on the north side of town, the Paso Robles Hot Springs facility opened on a 45-acre site. In 1940, the Inn burned down.

In 2003, following the San Simeon Earthquake (magnitude 6.5), a large hot spring vent and pit opened up in the center of town.

As of 2023, there are three commercial hot springs facilities that remain: Franklin Hot Springs, Paso Robles Inn, and River Oaks Hot Springs.

== Water profile ==
The hot spring water emerges from the city center source at 42.6 °C (108.7 °F). The pH is 6.85 and the primary mineral content of the water is Calcium and Magnesium carbonate-chloride with precipitates of sulfur, iron sulfide and barite. The geothermally heated water enters the aquifer of the Paso Robles Formation along fractures and faults in the rock.

In 1889, the spring water was purported to heal "acute and chronic rheumatism, articular affections, scrofula, blood, glandular and cutaneous diseases." It was also claimed that the water "proved highly beneficial" for catarrh of the naso-pharynx, engorgement of the pelvic organs as well as leucorrhoeal [sic] discharges.

== Gallery ==
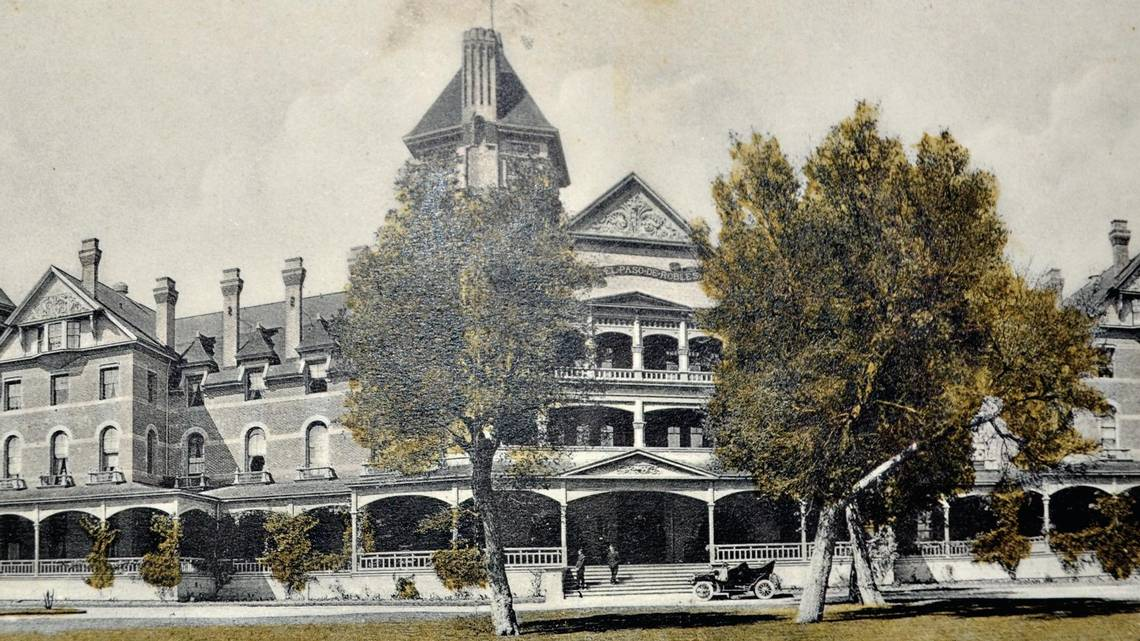
Paso Robles Hot Springs Hotel, c.1910

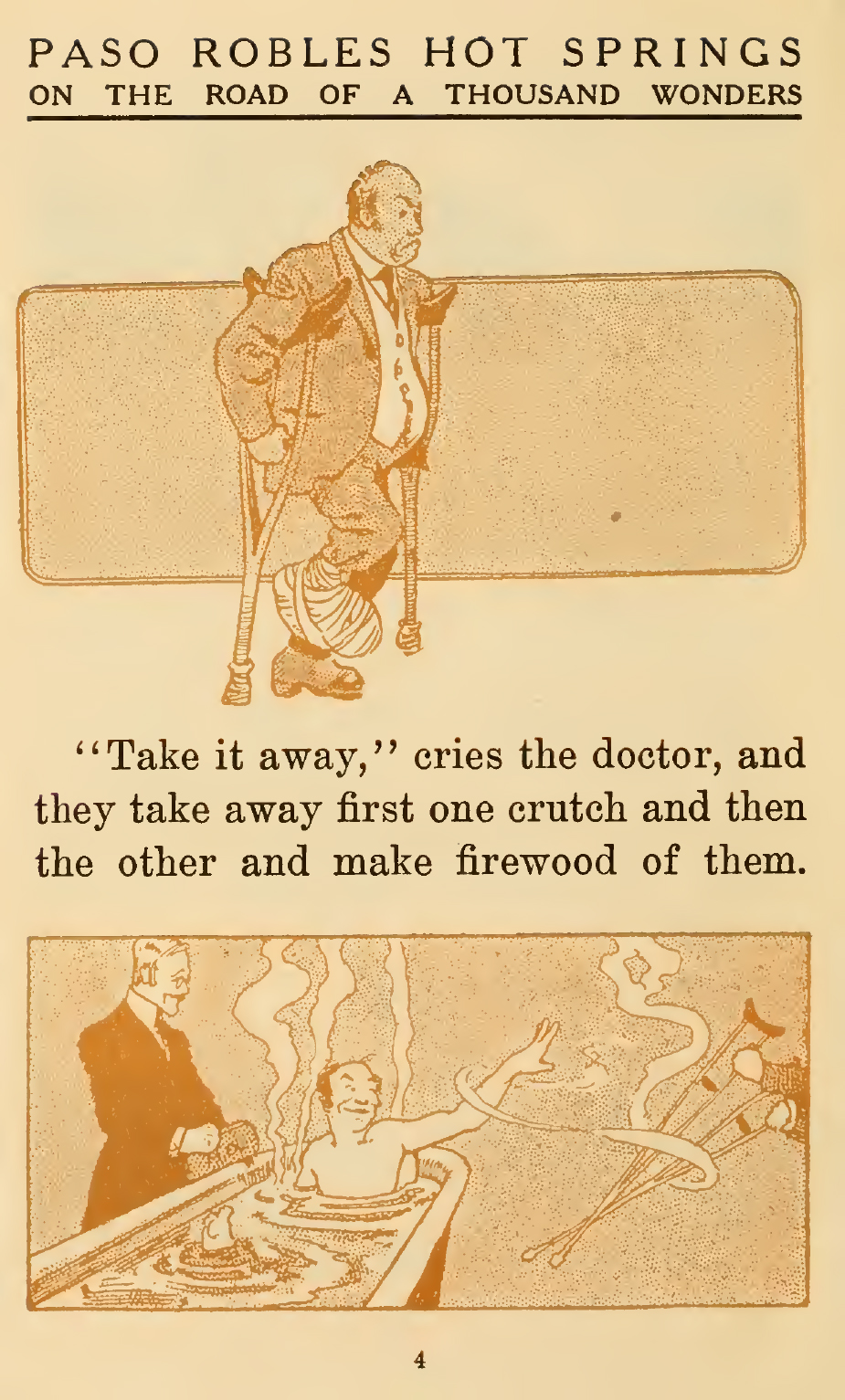
Paso Robles Hot Springs; illustration c.1910

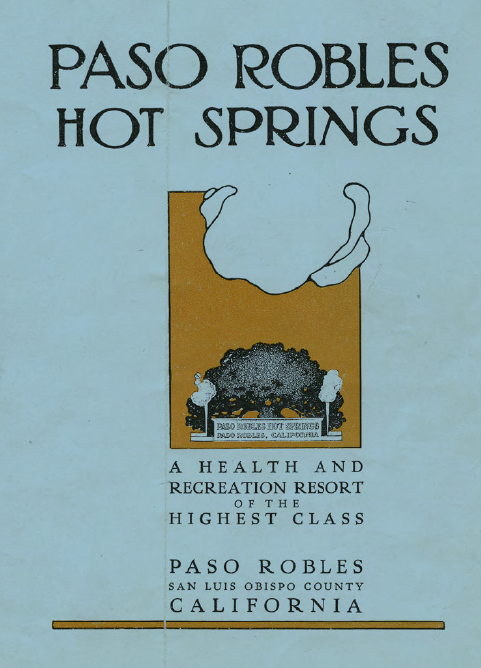
Paso Robles Hot Springs brochure c.1900

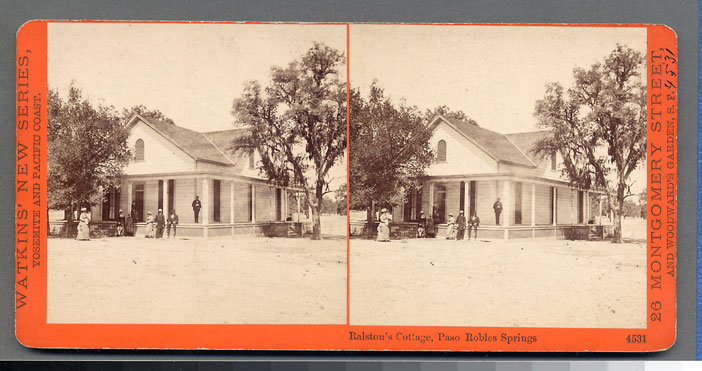
Carlton Watkins, 1880, Ralston's Cottage, Paso Robles Springs
