= Sycamore Mineral Springs Resort =

Geothermal well in California

Coordinates: 35.18576°N 120.71241°W

Sycamore Mineral Springs Resort is a resort located in San Luis Obispo County, California. It is located near Avila Beach. This resort is mostly known for its mineral springs as it rests atop a natural hot mineral spring. The property spans 116 acres (47 ha) and offers guests a variety of activities. The resort was originally known as San Luis Hot Sulphur Springs.
