= Avila Beach, California =

- Unincorporated community Census-designated place
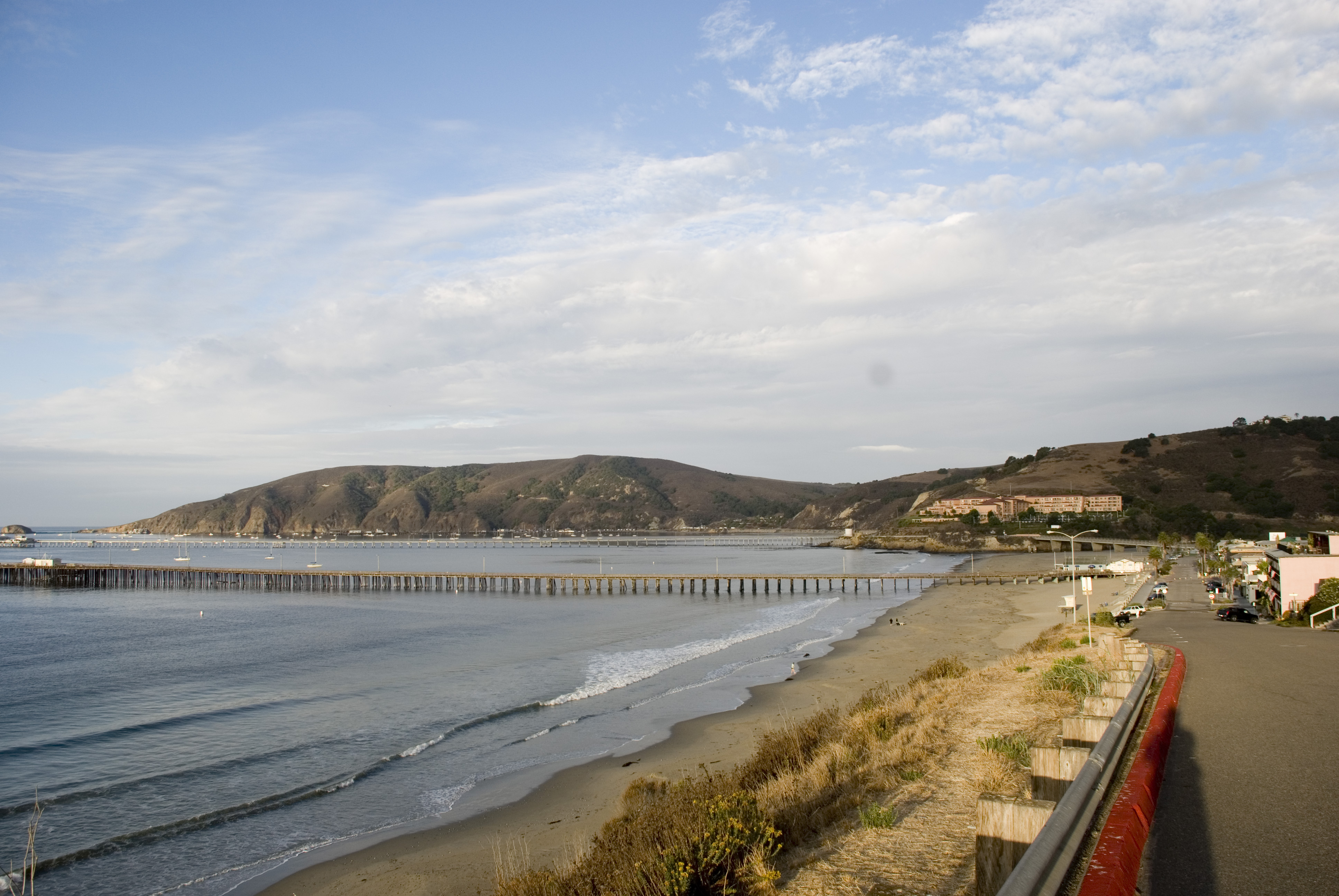
- Avila Beach, with Point San Luis at left

- Location of Avila Beach in San Luis Obispo County, California.

- Location within the state of California Avila Beach, California (the United States)
- Coordinates: 35°10′50.1″N 120°43′55.1″W
- Country: United States
- State: California
- County: San Luis Obispo

Area
  - Total: 6.31 sq mi (16.34 km^{2})
  - Land: 6.09 sq mi (15.77 km^{2})
  - Water: 0.22 sq mi (0.58 km^{2}) 0.29%
- Elevation: 430 ft (130 m)

Population (2020)
  - Total: 1,576
  - Density: 258.9/sq mi (99.96/km^{2})
- Time zone: UTC-8 (Pacific (PST))
  - Summer (DST): UTC-7 (PDT)
- ZIP code: 93424
- Area code: 805
- FIPS code: 06-03330
- GNIS feature ID: 2582937

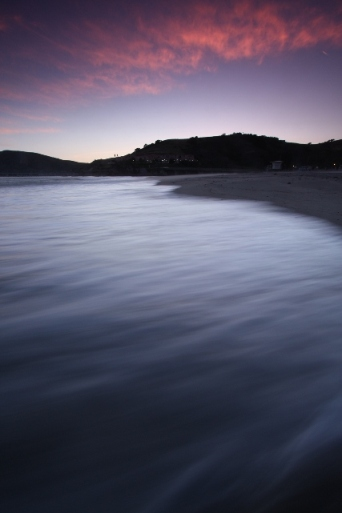
Sunset over Avila Beach, May 2010

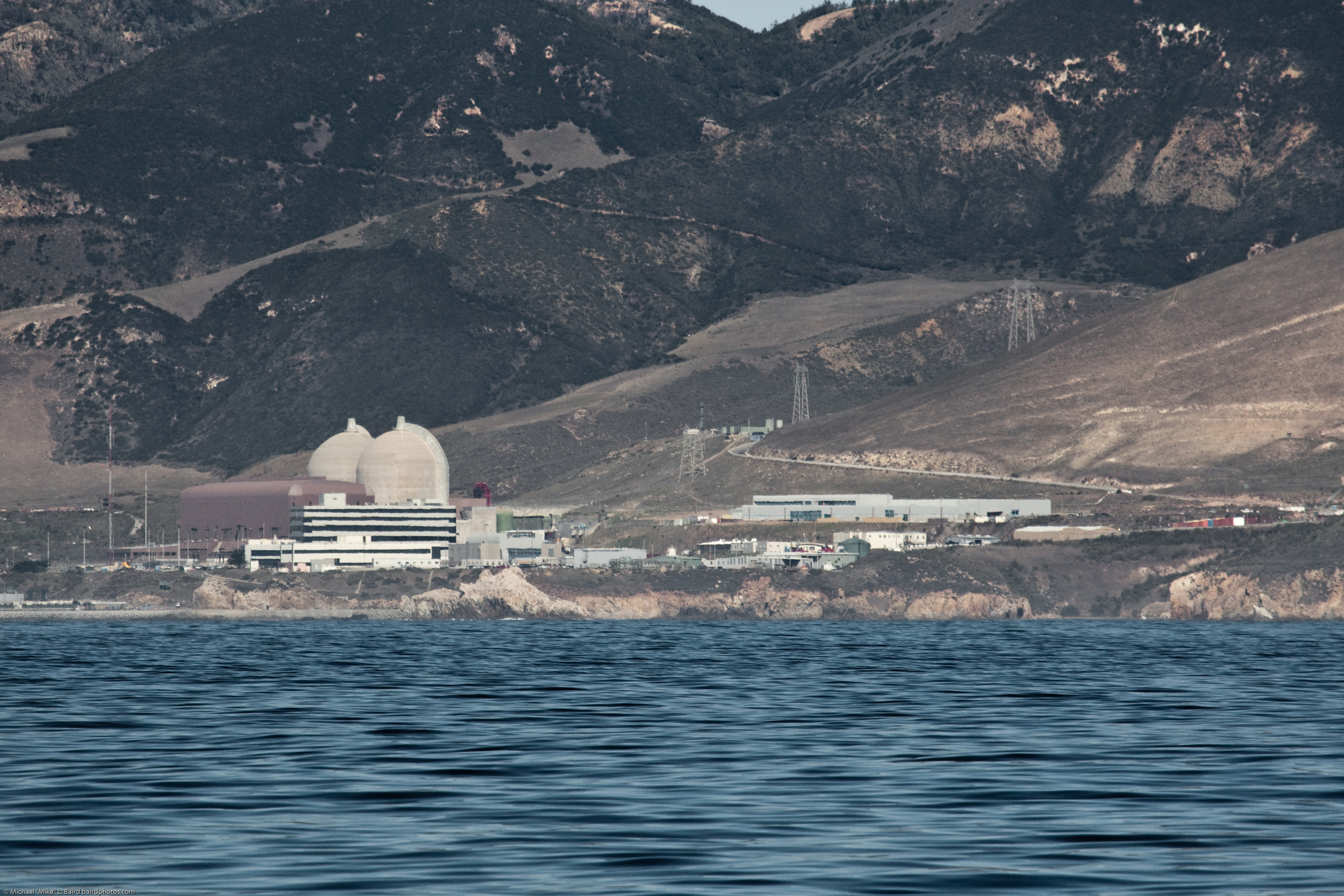
Diablo Canyon Power Plant near Port San Luis

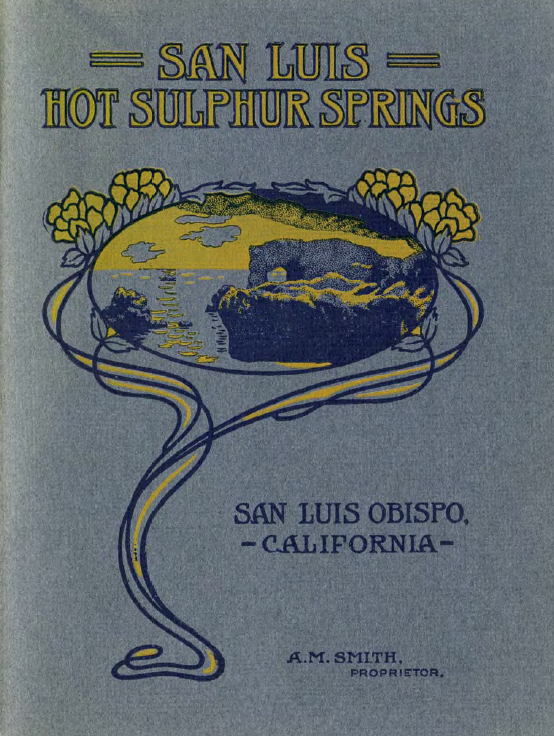
Brochure for San Luis Hot Springs (now Sycamore Mineral Springs Resort), circa 1915

Avila Beach (Spanish: Ávila) is an unincorporated community in San Luis Obispo County, California, United States, located on San Luis Obispo Bay about 160 miles (257 km) northwest of Los Angeles, and about 200 miles (320 km) south of San Francisco. The population was 1,576 at the 2020 census. For statistical purposes, the United States Census Bureau has defined Avila Beach as a census-designated place (CDP).

== History ==
The Chumash are the Indigenous people of Avila Beach. The first European contact with the Northern Chumash is believed to have occurred in the area in 1595 between Sebastian Rodriguez Cermeno and the indigenous peoples. Cermeno recorded at least 300 Chumash people with many settlements in the area who fed his crew with acorn-based dishes.

The name Avila commemorates Miguel Ávila, who was granted Rancho San Miguelito in 1842. The town was established in the latter half of the 19th century, when it served as the main shipping port for San Luis Obispo. Around this time, Luigi Marre built a honeymoon hotel here and steamboats brought customers from San Francisco and Los Angeles.

Although Avila Beach still has a working commercial fishing pier and the inland areas have extensive apple orchards, tourism is now the main industry. There are few historical structures remaining; among the oldest is the Point San Luis Lighthouse, built in 1890 after a series of shipping accidents. During World War II the beach and port were used for Amphibious Training Base Morro Bay.

In the late 1990s, Unocal began the cleanup of decades old oil seepage discovered years earlier from corroding pipes under the township, and which had caused a massive oil spill under the town. Over 6,750 truckloads of contaminated material was sent to a Bakersfield landfill, and replaced with clean Guadalupe Dunes sand. Many of the town's homes and businesses, including several blocks of Front Street, were razed as a result of the quarter-mile-wide excavation. New buildings, homes, businesses, modern walkways and sea motif walls and benches have been constructed.

== Geography ==
The main development in Avila Beach centers around the few blocks adjacent to the main beach. Restaurants, bars and shops line three blocks of Front Street. Homes, hotels, and small businesses are nearby. There are a few upscale housing developments inland near a golf course. Avila Beach is also known for its hot springs, which are used for resort spas.

San Luis Obispo Creek, which has a watershed of much of the San Luis Obispo area, drains into the sea just west of downtown via a lagoon. Due to some agricultural runoff, it is not recommended for swimming or wading.

According to the United States Census Bureau, the CDP covers an area of 6.0 square miles (15.6 km^{2}), of which 99.71% is land, and 0.29% is water.

=== Beaches ===
The main beach of the town, Avila Beach is less than 0.5 miles (0.8 km) long and sheltered in San Luis Bay, which is formed by Point San Luis on the west and Fossil Point on the east. Avila Beach faces south and the 600 foot elevation of Point San Luis breaks the prevailing northwesterly winds. It is therefore usually warmer than the other beaches on the Central Coast.

To the west of the Cal Poly SLO pier, the Olde Port Beach is dog friendly. Given its proximity to the port, this beach is not as good for water sports as the main town beach.

Further to the west, nearest the port is the small Fisherman's Beach.

=== Trails ===
The area has three well developed trails. The Bob Jones trail connects the Avila Beach Golf Resort on the west to a trailhead on the east near Highway 101. The three mile trail follows an old railroad right-of-way. It is a part of a planned future trail connecting to San Luis Obispo.

The Shell Beach Bluff Trail connects a trailhead at the end of Cave Landing Road to Smuggler's Cave to the south, Pirate's Cove Beach in the middle, and to Bluff Drive in the Shell Beach neighborhood of Pismo Beach to the east. There is a view of the town to be found by looking through the Smuggler's Cave.

The Pecho Coast Trail connects the Port San Luis to the Point San Luis Lighthouse. The trail's starting point is near the corner of Diablo Canyon Road and Avila Beach Drive. A docent is required for this hike.

=== Climate ===
Average temperatures vary little during the year, ranging from 47–49 °F (8–9 °C) to 70–72 °F (21–22 °C) from November through April, and from 60–69 °F (16–21 °C) to 80–82 °F (27–28 °C) from May through October. Average annual rainfall is 15 inches (380 mm). Along with much of the California coast, winter is the wet season, with more than 70% of the yearly rain falling from December through March, while summer brings drought conditions.

== Demographics ==
Historical population
Census	Pop.	Note	%±
2010	1,627		—
2020	1,576		−3.1%
U.S. Decennial Census; 1860–1870 1880-1890; 1900 1910 1920; 1930 1940 1950; 1960 1970 1980; 1990 2000 2010

Avila Beach first appeared as a census-designated place under the name Avilla Beach in the 2010 United States census.

=== 2020 census ===
As of the 2020 census, Avila Beach had a population of 1,576 and a population density of 258.9 inhabitants per square mile (100.0/km^{2}). The whole population lived in households, and 58.0% of residents lived in urban areas while 42.0% lived in rural areas.

There were 789 households, of which 12.7% had children under the age of 18. Of all households, 50.8% were married-couple households, 4.6% were cohabiting-couple households, 16.3% were households with a male householder and no spouse or partner present, and 28.3% were households with a female householder and no spouse or partner present. About 35.4% of households were made up of individuals, and 20.5% had someone living alone who was 65 years of age or older. The average household size was 2.0, and there were 464 families (58.8% of all households).

The age distribution was 9.7% under the age of 18, 6.1% aged 18 to 24, 14.3% aged 25 to 44, 27.9% aged 45 to 64, and 42.0% aged 65 or older. The median age was 60.6 years. For every 100 females, there were 90.1 males, and for every 100 females age 18 and over, there were 89.7 males age 18 and over.

There were 1,068 housing units at an average density of 175.5 units per square mile (67.8 units/km^{2}). Of all housing units, 26.1% were vacant and 789 (73.9%) were occupied. Of occupied units, 67.6% were owner-occupied and 32.4% were occupied by renters. The homeowner vacancy rate was 2.0%, and the rental vacancy rate was 12.6%.

Racial composition as of the 2020 census
Race	Number	Percent
White	1,344	85.3%
Black or African American	7	0.4%
American Indian and Alaska Native	4	0.3%
Asian	34	2.2%
Native Hawaiian and Other Pacific Islander	2	0.1%
Some other race	71	4.5%
Two or more races	114	7.2%
Hispanic or Latino (of any race)	158	10.0%

== Economy ==
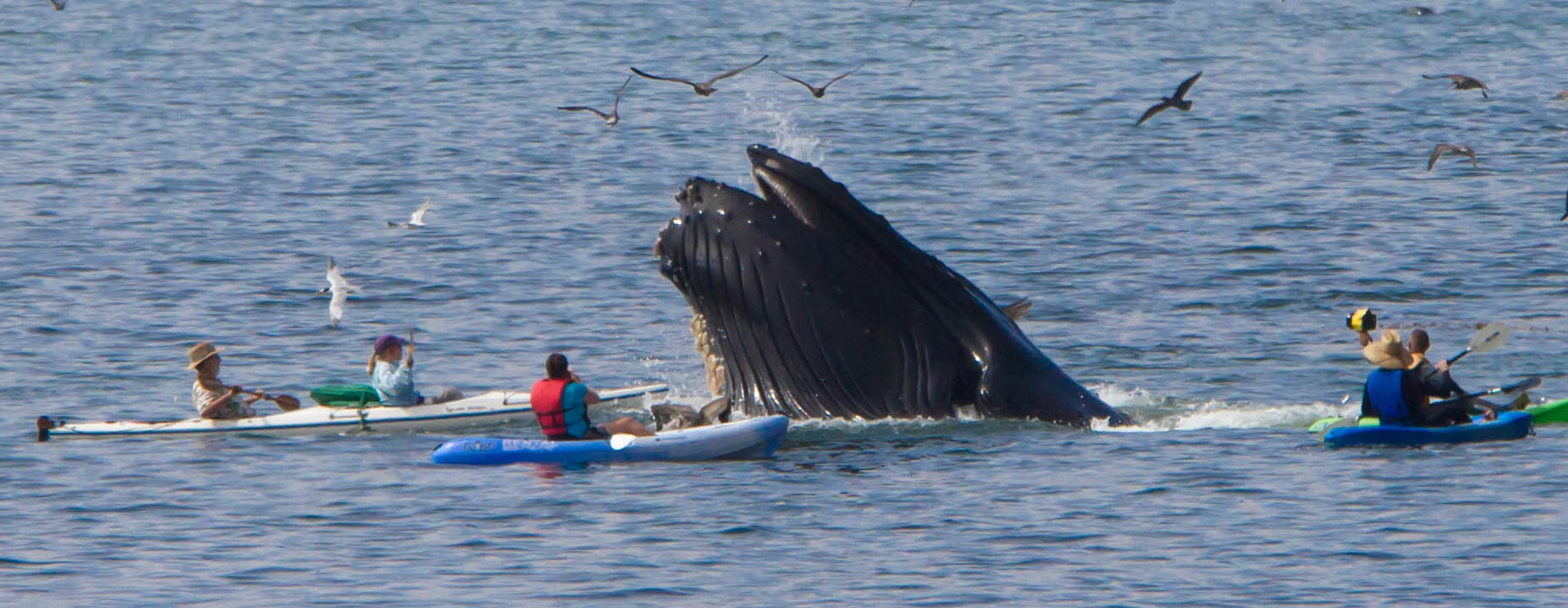
Humpback whales are becoming features for local tourism.

Avila Beach and adjacent Port San Luis have three piers. The pier that is farthest east is the Avila Beach Pier, 1,685 feet (514 m) in length, which has been closed since 2015 due to structural engineering considerations. The middle pier is the California Polytechnic State University (Cal Poly SLO) Pier, part of the university's marine research program, is not publicly accessible. The westernmost pier is the Harford Pier, which is for commercial fishing boats to offload their wares since 1873.

The Harford Pier has become a site for whale watching as numbers of grays and humpback whales come into the bay around the pier to feed and draw crowds during the seasons.

Diablo Canyon Power Plant, the last remaining nuclear power plant in California, is located in a remote area, about 6 miles (9.7 km) northwest of the beach. The access road to the plant is located near the Harford Pier.

== Education ==
Avila Beach is served by the San Luis Coastal Unified School District.

== Tourism ==
The Tourism Alliance edits the portal VisitAvilaBeach.com to attract tourists. The site is featured on the Global Visit List

== In popular culture ==
The Avila Beach Pier was featured in a Super Bowl advertisement on February 7, 2010.

Avila Beach was the primary shooting location for the 1979 film California Dreaming, which starred Dennis Christopher, Glynnis O'Connor, and Seymour Cassel.

== Gallery ==
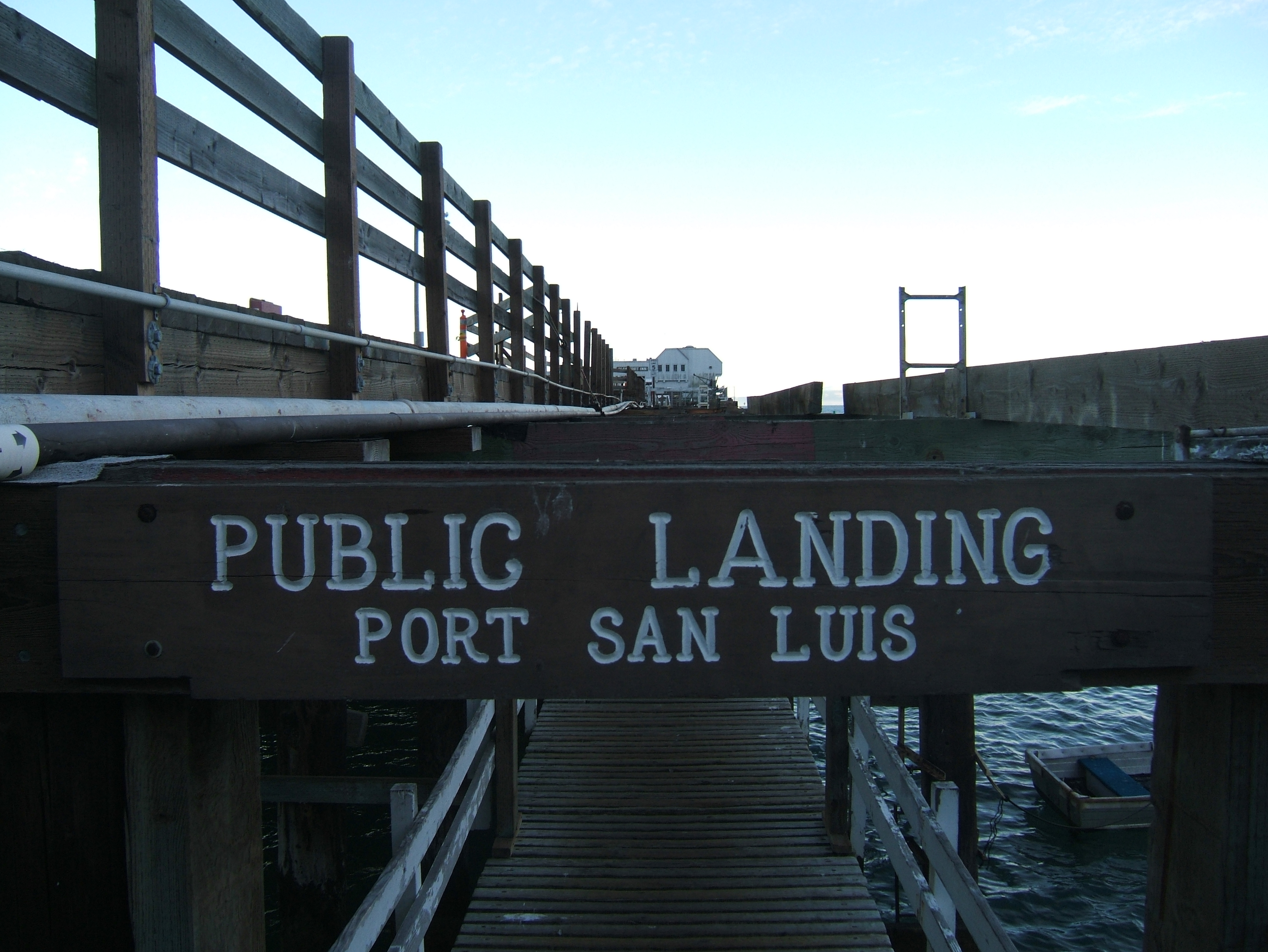
Port San Luis Pier. The pier also has a live fish market and harbor patrol office.

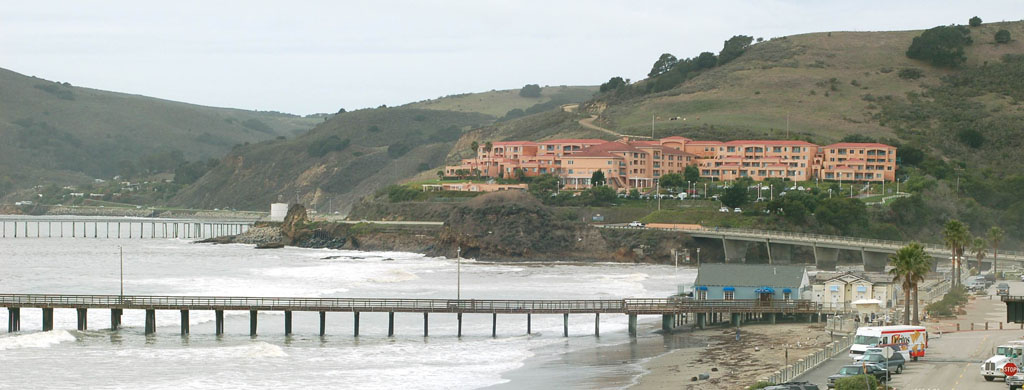
Avila Beach and its piers.

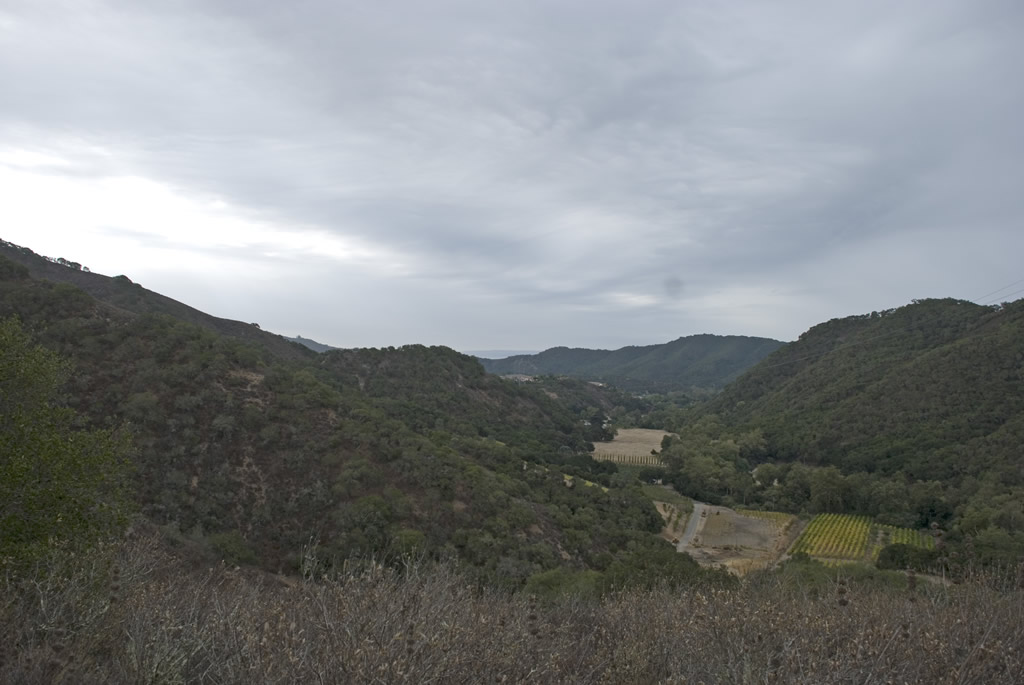
See Canyon in Avila Beach, with apple orchards visible in the distance.

Avila Beach and Harford Pier, late 19th century. Point San Luis and Whaler's Island are visible in the near distance.

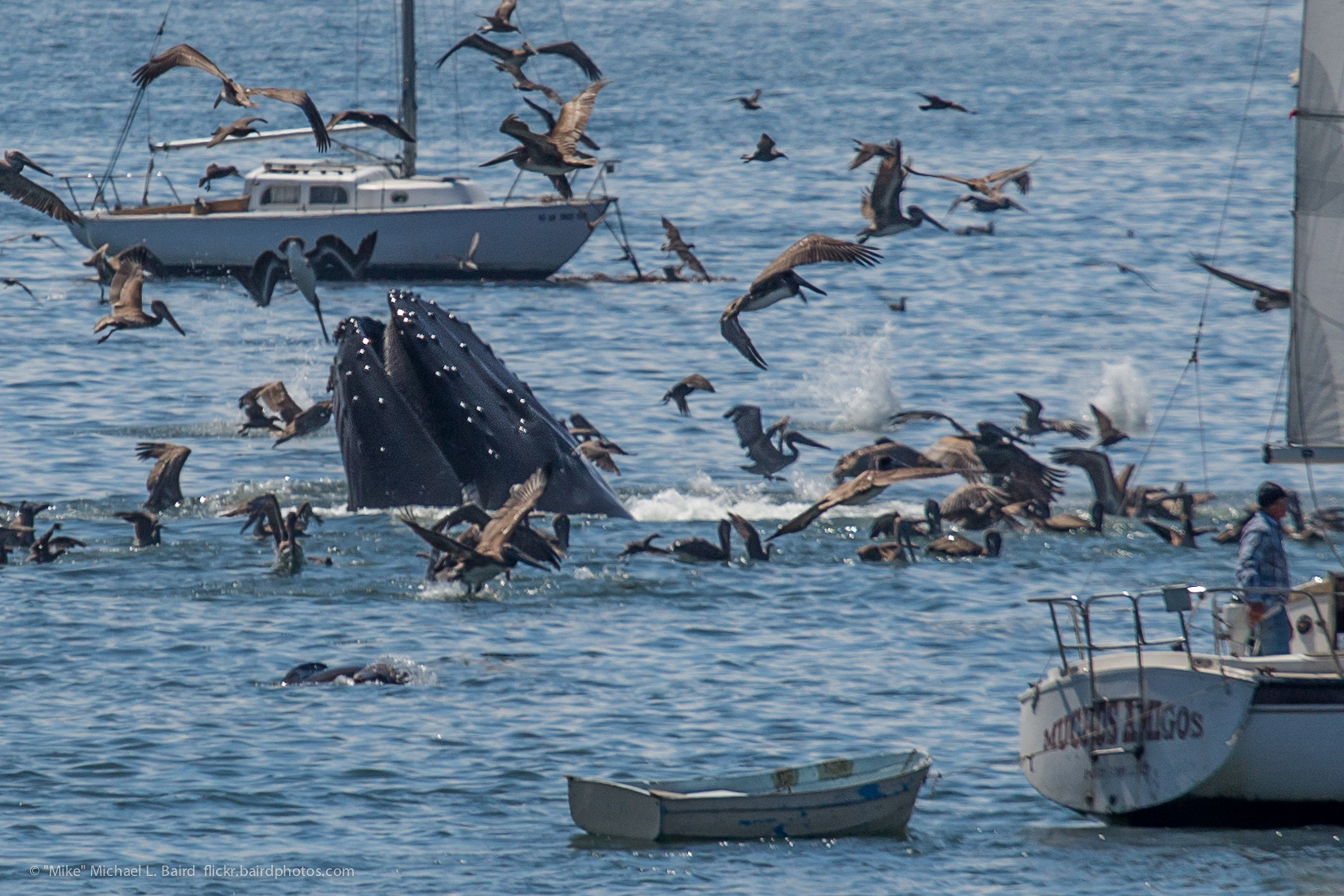
Humpback whale lunge feeding off Avila Beach, 2012

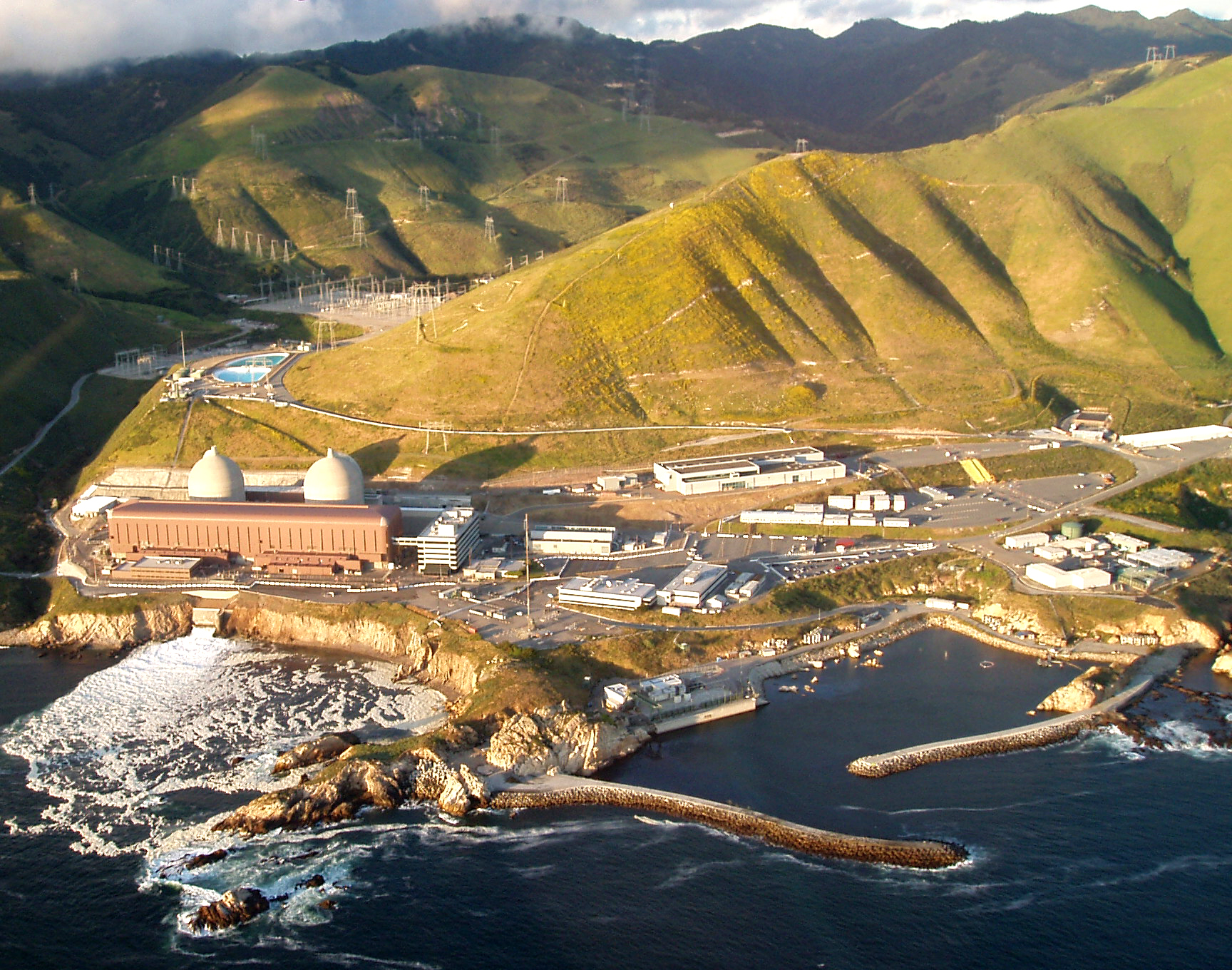
Diablo Canyon Power Plant

== See also ==
- List of beaches in California
- List of California state parks
