= Point San Luis Lighthouse =

Lighthouse on the National Register of Historic Places in California

Point San Luis Lighthouse San Luis Obispo Port Harford
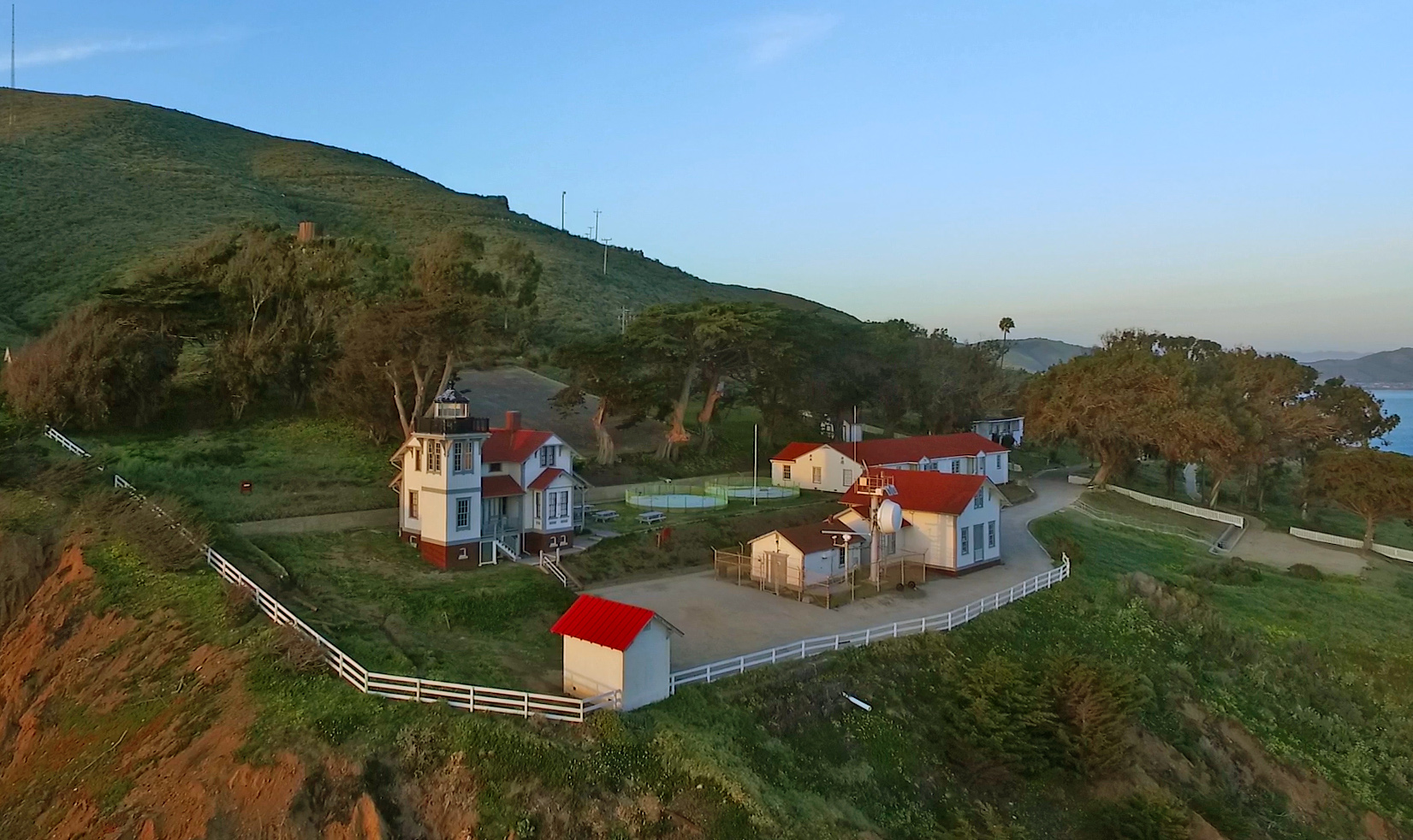
- Aerial View of San Luis Obispo Lighthouse, March 2016
- Location: Point San Luis; Avila Beach, California; United States
- Coordinates: 35.160362°N 120.760882°W

Tower
- Constructed: 1890 (first)
- Foundation: brick basement
- Construction: wooden tower (first) metal pole (current)
- Automated: 1974
- Height: 40 feet (12 m) (first)
- Shape: square tower with balcony and lantern attached to keeper's house (first) pole light (current)
- Markings: white tower, black lantern
- Operator: Port San Luis Lighthouse
- Heritage: National Register of Historic Places listed place

Light
- First lit: 1975 (current)
- Deactivated: 1975 (first)
- Focal height: 116 feet (35 m) (current)
- Lens: Fourth Order Fresnel lens (removed 1969)
- Range: 17 nautical miles (31 km; 20 mi)
- Characteristic: Fl W 5s. (night and day)
- San Luis Obispo Light Station
- U.S. National Register of Historic Places
- U.S. Historic district
- Area: 30 acres (12 ha)
- Architect: US Lighthouse Board, 12th District
- Architectural style: Stick/eastlake, Lighthouse
- MPS: Light Stations of California MPS
- NRHP reference No.: 91001093
- Added to NRHP: September 3, 1991

The Point San Luis Lighthouse, also known as the San Luis Obispo Light Station, is on the National Register of Historic Places. Located near Avila Beach and Port San Luis on the Central Coast of California in San Luis Obispo County, it is one of two Prairie Victorian model lighthouse left on the West Coast of the United States. It is being refurbished by the Point San Luis Lighthouse Keepers, a volunteer group. The other is Point Fermin Lighthouse in San Pedro.

== History ==
The need for a lighthouse at Point San Luis was recognized as early as 1867. In that year, President Andrew Johnson directed by Executive Order the Department of the Interior to investigate the logistics of placing a lighthouse at that location. In the 1870s, Port Harford was quite busy, averaging 400 ships per year arriving at that location, and the need for a lighthouse was again discovered. In 1877, the Tribune of San Luis Obispo reported that Congressman Romualdo Pacheco had introduced a bill for the construction of a lighthouse at Point San Luis. This early effort was not successful, but in 1886 Congress finally passed the funding authorization for the lighthouse.

The construction of the lighthouse was delayed and it took the near disaster of a ship sinking to move the project ahead. On the night of April 29, 1888, a ship called the Queen of the Pacific began to take on water. It was about 2 am and the ship was about 15 miles (24 km) from Port Harford. The captain turned his ship to the harbor but had to proceed slowly because of the dark and for fear of the rocks at the harbor entrance. The ship made it to within about 500 feet (150 m) of the pier, where it settled to the bottom in just 22 feet (6.7 m) of water. Since most of the ship was still above water, there were no lives lost. It was argued, however, that with a lighthouse to guide it, the ship would have easily made it to the pier. This provided the final impetus for the creation of the lighthouse.

The lighthouse was completed in June 1890, and was lit for the first time on June 30, 1890, with the steam powered fog whistle becoming operational in 1891. By specification, the 4th Order Fresnel lens would generate alternate red and white flashes of light every 30 seconds that would be visible 17 nautical miles (31 km) out to sea. In 1969, the Fresnel lens was retired (it is currently on display at the Point SLO Lighthouse) and replaced by an automated electric light. In 1974, the Coast Guard decommissioned the light station.

== Access ==
In 1992, the Port San Luis Harbor District received the Point San Luis site from the Federal Government, with the understanding that the light station be a historical, educational, and recreational site, for the use and enjoyment of the public. In 1995, the Point San Luis Lighthouse Keepers non-profit corporation was created to manage that task. In early 2010 to mark the 120th anniversary of the lighthouse the Fresnel lens was returned to the station and placed on display. A van service was put in place for trips to the lighthouse. Point San Luis runs weekly van tours, a docent led hike via the Pecho Coast Trail, hosts weddings, and has ongoing special events for the public.

The Pecho Coast Trail connects the Port San Luis to the Point San Luis Lighthouse. The trail's starting point is near the corner of Diablo Canyon Road and Avila Beach Drive. A docent is required for the hike.

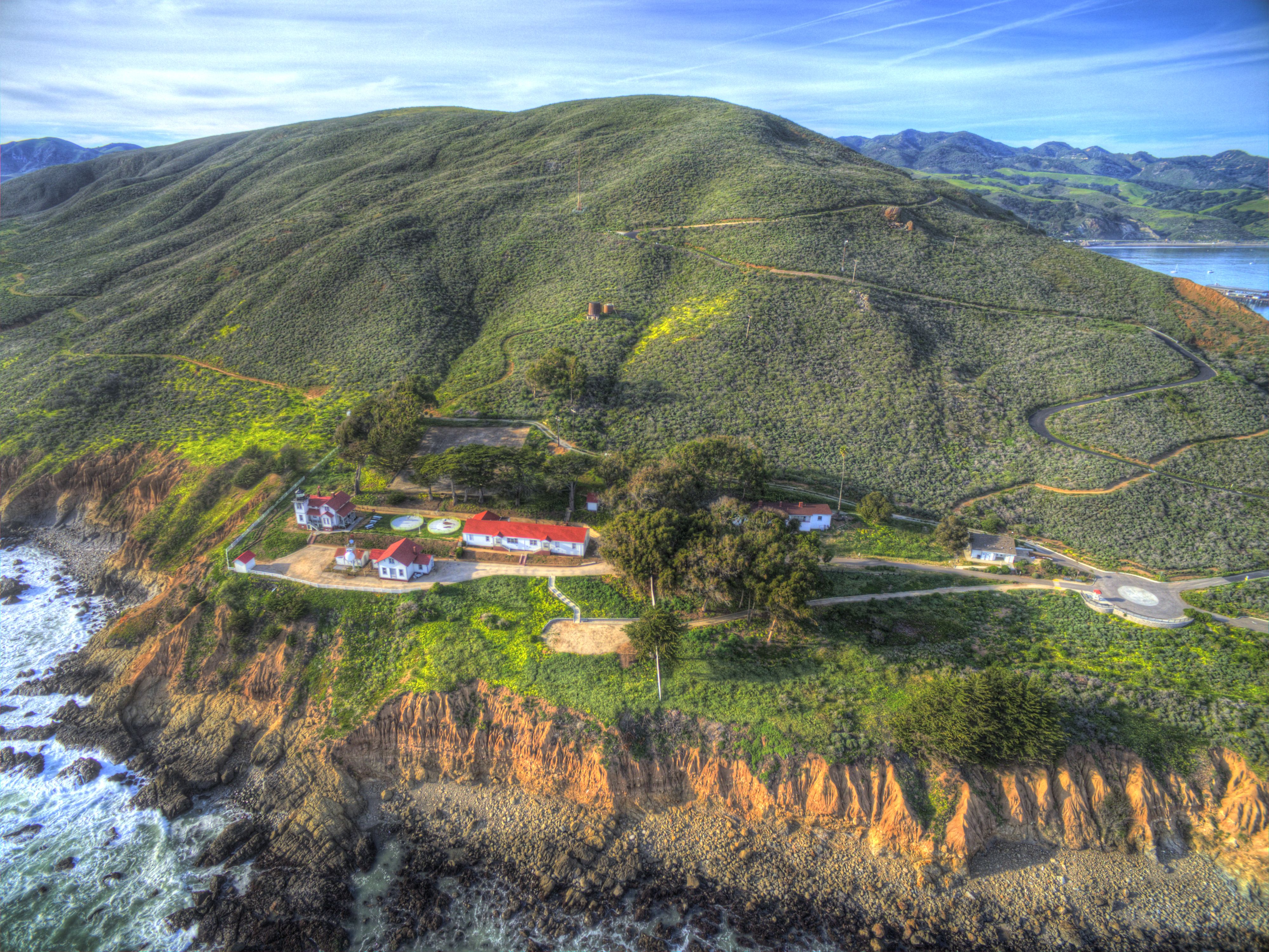
San Luis Obispo Lighthouse, March 2016. Photo: Wolfgang Kaml
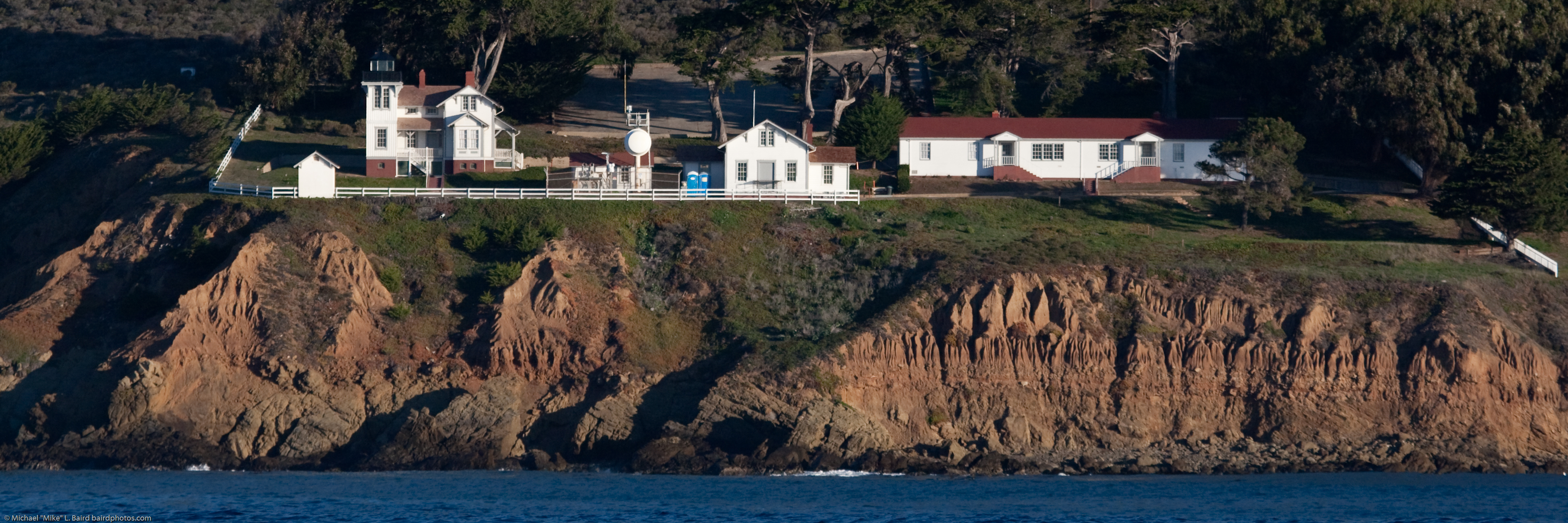
Point San Luis, CA lighthouse and light station, 2009. Photo: Mike Baird

== See also ==
- List of lighthouses in the United States
