= Prefumo Creek =

Natural watercourse in San Luis Obispo County, California, United States of America

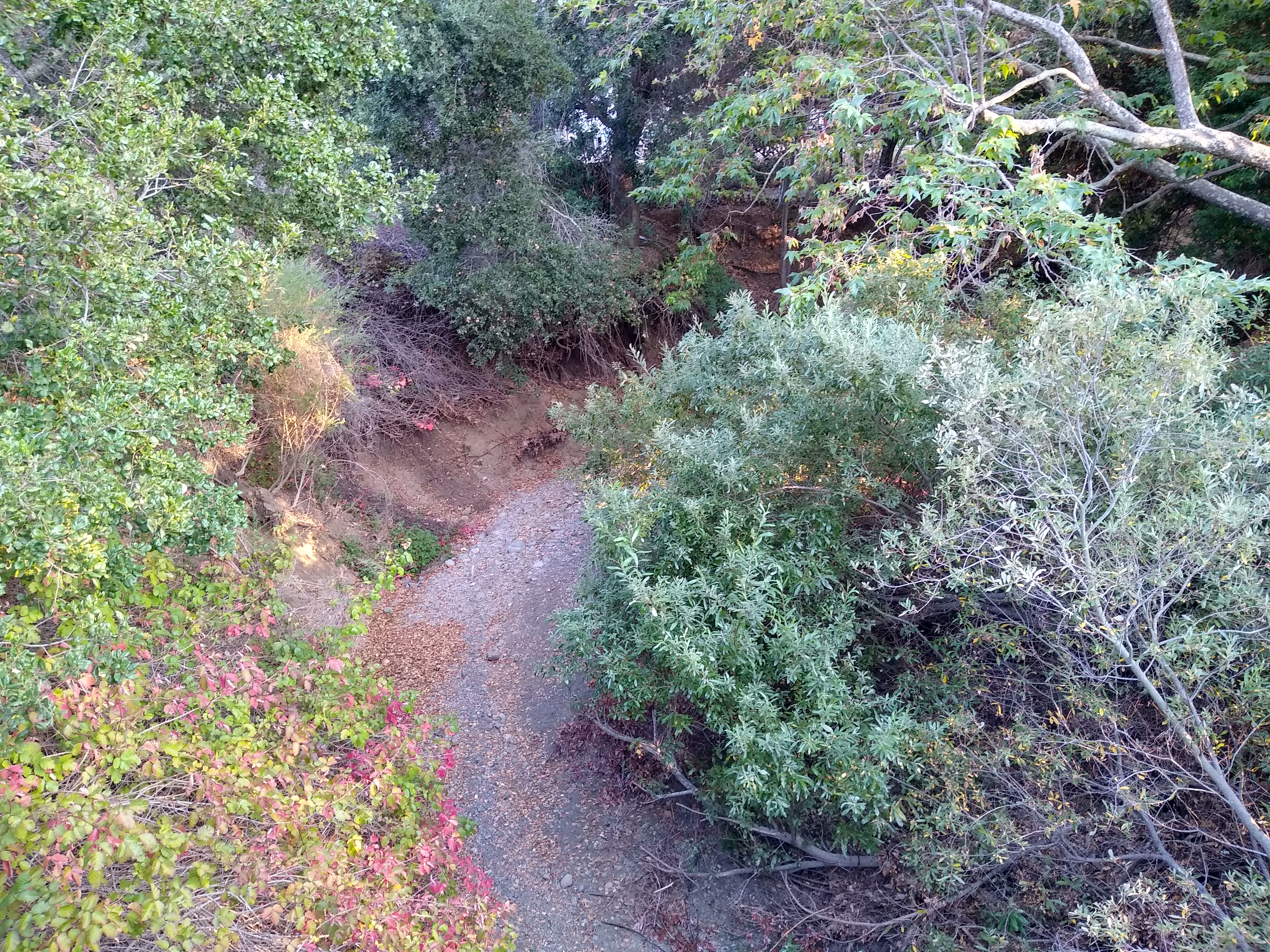
Prefumo Creek in summer 2021

Prefumo Creek is a tributary stream of San Luis Obispo Creek. Its mouth is at its confluence with San Luis Obispo Creek at an elevation of 102 feet (31 meters). Its source is found at 35°15′41″N 120°45′28″W in the Irish Hills. From its source it flows down into Laguna Lake at 35°15′51″N 120°41′32″W, and provides the overflow channel from the lake at 35°15′35″N 120°41′01″W that drains to the San Luis Obispo Creek.
