= Rancho Bolsa de Chamisal =

Land grant in California

Coordinates: 35.070°N 120.590°W

Rancho Bolsa de Chamisal was a 14,335-acre (58.01 km^{2}) Mexican land grant in present-day San Luis Obispo County, California given in 1837 by Governor Juan B. Alvarado to Francisco Quijada. The grant extended along the Pacific coast, just south of present-day Oceano, and was bordered on the north by Rancho Pismo and the south by Rancho Guadalupe.

== History ==
Vicente Quijada (1755–) came to California with the 1781 Rivera expedition. Quijada was part of the Santa Barbara founding garrison in 1782. In 1779 Vicente Quijada first married Juana María Armenta (1755–1783). In 1785, he married his second wife, Antonia Josefa Pinuelas (1773 –1839) and they had four children, Maria Dolores Quijada, Leonora Manuela Quijada, Nasario Quijada and Francisco Quijada.

Pedro Regalado Cordero (1785–1851), son of Mariano Antonio Cordero (1750–1821), married Maria Dolores Claudia Quijada (1793–1843) in 1808. Cordero was granted the one and a half square league Rancho Cañada de Salsipuedes in 1844. In 1846 Pedro Cordero sold his share of Rancho Bolsa de Chamisal to Lewis T. Burton. Manuela, Nasario, and Francisco Quijada also sold their interests to Burton.

Lewis (Luis) T. Burton (1809–1879) of Tennessee came overland with the Wolfskill party to California in 1831 and arrived in the Santa Barbara area shortly thereafter to trap otter. In 1839, he married Maria Antonia Carrillo (1822–1843), (daughter of Carlos Antonio Carrillo). Burton served under John C. Frémont, and was the first American Mayor of Santa Barbara in 1850. In 1847, Burton bought Rancho Jesús María.

With the cession of California to the United States following the Mexican-American War, the 1848 Treaty of Guadalupe Hidalgo provided that the land grants would be honored. As required by the Land Act of 1851, a claim for Rancho Bolsa de Chamisal was filed with the Public Land Commission in 1852, and the grant was patented to Lewis T. Burton in 1867.

In 1856, Burton sold Rancho Bolsa de Chamisal to Francis Ziba Branch (1802–1874), grantee of Rancho Santa Manuela and part owner of Rancho Arroyo Grande, Rancho Pismo and Rancho Huerhuero. In 1866, Branch sold part of the rancho to dairymen George Steele and his brothers Edgar W., Isaac C., and Rensselaer E. Steele.

== See also ==
- Ranchos of California
- List of Ranchos of California
