= Rancho Huerhuero =

Mexican land grant

Coordinates: 35.540°N 120.530°W

Rancho Huerhuero was a 15,685-acre (25 sq mi) Mexican land grant in present-day San Luis Obispo County, California of one square league given in 1842 by Governor Juan Alvarado and another three square leagues given in 1846 by Governor Pío Pico to José Mariano Bonilla. The grant extended along Huerhuero Creek and encompassed present day Creston southeast of Paso Robles.

== History ==
The Rancho Huer Huero grant was one square league by Governor Alvarado and three additional leagues by Governor Pio Pico of former Mission San Miguel Arcángel land. José Mariano Bonilla (1807–1878), born in Mexico City, came to California in 1834 with the Híjar-Padrés Colony. He married Maria Dolores Garcia (1822–1902)in 1838. He held various public offices in San Luis Obispo, including alcalde.

His managers suffered repeatedly from Indian raids, and he sold Rancho Huerhuero to Francis Branch in 1847. Francis Ziba Branch (1802–1874) was the grantee of Rancho Santa Manuela and part owner of Rancho Arroyo Grande, Rancho Pismo and Rancho Bolsa de Chamisal.

With the cession of California to the United States following the Mexican-American War, the 1848 Treaty of Guadalupe Hidalgo provided that the land grants would be honored. As required by the Land Act of 1851, a claim for Rancho Huerhuero was filed with the Public Land Commission in 1852, and the grant was patented to Branch in 1866.

In 1859 Branch sold Rancho Huerhuero to Irish sea captain David P.Mallagh (1824–1875). Mallagh came to California in 1849, and soon afterward married Juana de Jesús Carrillo (1834–1901) of Rancho Cabeza de Santa Rosa. Mallagh owned part of Rancho Pismo, which he sold and bought Rancho Huerhuero. Two days later, Mallagh sold the rancho to Flint, Bixby & Co.

In the mid-1880s, Flint and Bixby sold Rancho Huerhuero to Amos Adams, Thomas Ambrose, Calvin J. Cressy, and J.V. Webster. The town of Creston, named for Cressy, was founded in 1884.

== See also ==
- Ranchos of California
- List of Ranchos of California
