= Sheila Varian =

American horse breeder (1937–2016)

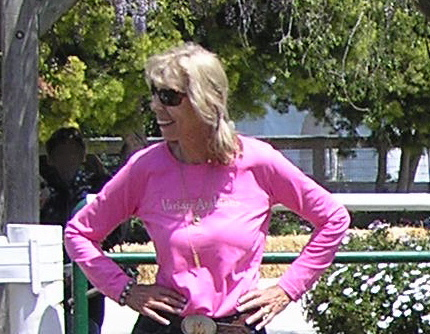
- Sheila Varian in April 2010
- Born: August 8, 1937; Santa Maria, California, U.S.
- Died: March 6, 2016 (aged 78); Arroyo Grande, California, U.S.
- Education: California Polytechnic State University
- Occupations: Arabian horse breeder, trainer, owner
- Known for: Horsewoman; Cowgirl Hall of Fame inductee
- Relatives: John Osborne Varian (grandfather); Russell and Sigurd Varian (uncles)

Sheila Varian (August 8, 1937 – March 6, 2016) was an American breeder of Arabian horses who lived and worked at the Varian Arabians Ranch near Arroyo Grande, California. She grew up with a strong interest in horses, and was mentored in horsemanship by Mary "Sid" Spencer, a local rancher and Morgan horse breeder who also introduced Varian to the vaquero or "Californio" tradition of western riding. She started her horse ranch, Varian Arabians, in 1954 with the assistance of her parents. Raising and training horses was her full-time occupation beginning in 1963. She used vaquero-influenced methods of training horses, although she adapted her technique over the years to fit the character of the Arabian horse, which she viewed as a horse breed requiring a smart yet gentle approach.

Varian produced a number of influential Arabian horses whose bloodlines are found in a significant number of winning Arabian show horses in the United States. She began her breeding program with a small number of mares whom she bred to her national champion stallion, Bay Abi. She then acquired three mares from Arabian farms in Poland at a time when that nation was still behind the Iron Curtain and importation of horses to the United States was very difficult. These mares and Bay Abi formed her foundation bloodstock. As of 2016, the Varian horses at stud represent the sixth generation of her stallion breeding line, and her foundation mare lines have produced nine generations of offspring. For her accomplishments, Varian received recognition from the United States Equestrian Federation, as well as several awards from various organizations within the Arabian horse industry. For her contributions as breeder and as a horse trainer in the vaquero tradition, she was inducted into the National Cowgirl Museum and Hall of Fame in 2003.

After she was diagnosed with ovarian cancer in 2013, she sought to place the 230-acre Varian Ranch into a conservation easement to protect the land from development, and in 2015 announced that the California Rangeland Trust would partner with her to purchase the development rights and to allow her long-time ranch manager, Angela Alvarez, to operate the horse breeding program after Varian. After Alvarez, the property would be gifted to the Trust to be sold, the conservation easement running with the land, and the Trust would try to find a buyer that would maintain the Arabian horse breeding program as well. Varian died on March 6, 2016, at age 78.

== Early years ==
Varian grew up in Halcyon, California with a strong interest in horses, combined with a fondness for horse books such as the works of Marguerite Henry and The Black Stallion series written by Walter Farley. She credited Farley's books as the origin of her interest in Arabian horses. She was given her first horse, a Morgan-Percheron crossbred, at the age of eight, and rode bareback until she obtained her first saddle at age 12. Although her parents, Eric and Wenonah Varian, did not have an equestrian background, they always supported her interest in horses, allowing both her and her older sister the freedom to ride horses as much as they wanted. Varian matured to be 6 feet (1.8 m) tall, and has stated that while she "struggled" with her height as a young person, she found comfort in riding horses: "all my troubles went away."

The very first thing I have to say is that I love horses. I've loved horses since I was a little girl. I didn't come from a family of horse people, but some of us were just born to love horses and I love them.

— Sheila Varian

Varian and her parents began using the farm name "Varian Arabians" in 1954. She credited her parents for helping her believe that she could do whatever she wanted to do and for trusting her own judgement, which gave her confidence in her own ability to work with horses. They worked as a team to build a horse business; Eric, an electrical contractor, built fences and managed the land, Wenonah studied pedigrees, and Sheila handled the horses. In time, their ranch expanded from 21 to 150 acres. As a young adult, Varian completed college at California Polytechnic State University and taught high school physical education for three years, until 1963, when running the Varian Arabian ranch became her full-time job. The ranch was self-supporting from 1963 on, with the short-term assistance of loans from Sheila's aunt, Dorothy Varian, which were promptly repaid. Ultimately, the ranch grew to 230 acres.

== The Varian horses ==
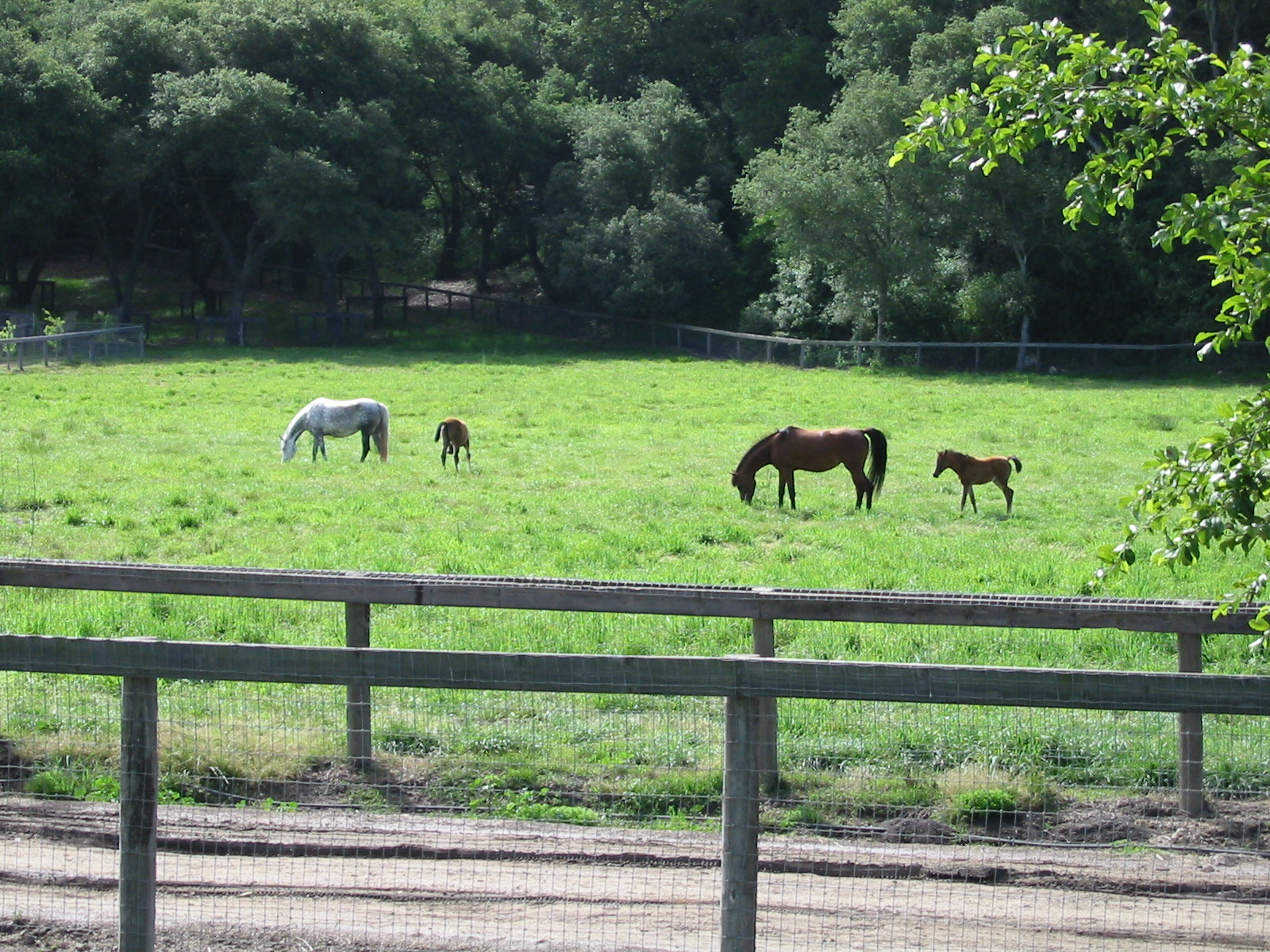
Mares and foals in a field at Varian Arabians

Varian preferred the Arabian breed because "their instinctual interest in and appreciation for people runs deep in their genes. The Arabian's lightness and responsiveness are wonderful, as is their willingness to be your partner. And...they are beautiful. Arabian horses have never let me down." She valued horses with good dispositions and athletic ability as well as attractive appearance. She does not breed Arabians for a specific discipline, instead describes her breeding philosophy as "consistently continuing to breed for more quality and never losing disposition or athletic ability." Following these principles, Varian has produced some of the most influential Arabian stallions in the breed.

When she was young, Varian developed an interest in finding the "perfect" horse. She soon realized that the way to achieve her goal was to begin breeding horses. Her first Arabian was the mare Farlotta (Lotnik × Farza), obtained in 1952. Farlotta became a finished spade bit horse who won both stock horse (reining) and western pleasure championships. Although loved and cared for by Varian, the mare had been neglected in her first two years prior to being purchased by Varian, and as a result of underlying health damage died at the age of seven.

In 1959, Varian and her mother Wenonah purchased a two-year-old bay stallion named Bay-Abi (Errabi × Angyl). Trained and shown by Varian, he was the judges' unanimous choice for U.S. National Champion Arabian Stallion in 1962, later won U.S. National Top Ten awards in both Arabian English pleasure and Western pleasure, and thereafter was awarded the Legion of Merit. Even though he was not bred to any mares until after he was fully trained, and thus his first foals did not appear in the show ring until he was 7, he sired 275 registered Arabians, including 65 champions and 24 national winners.

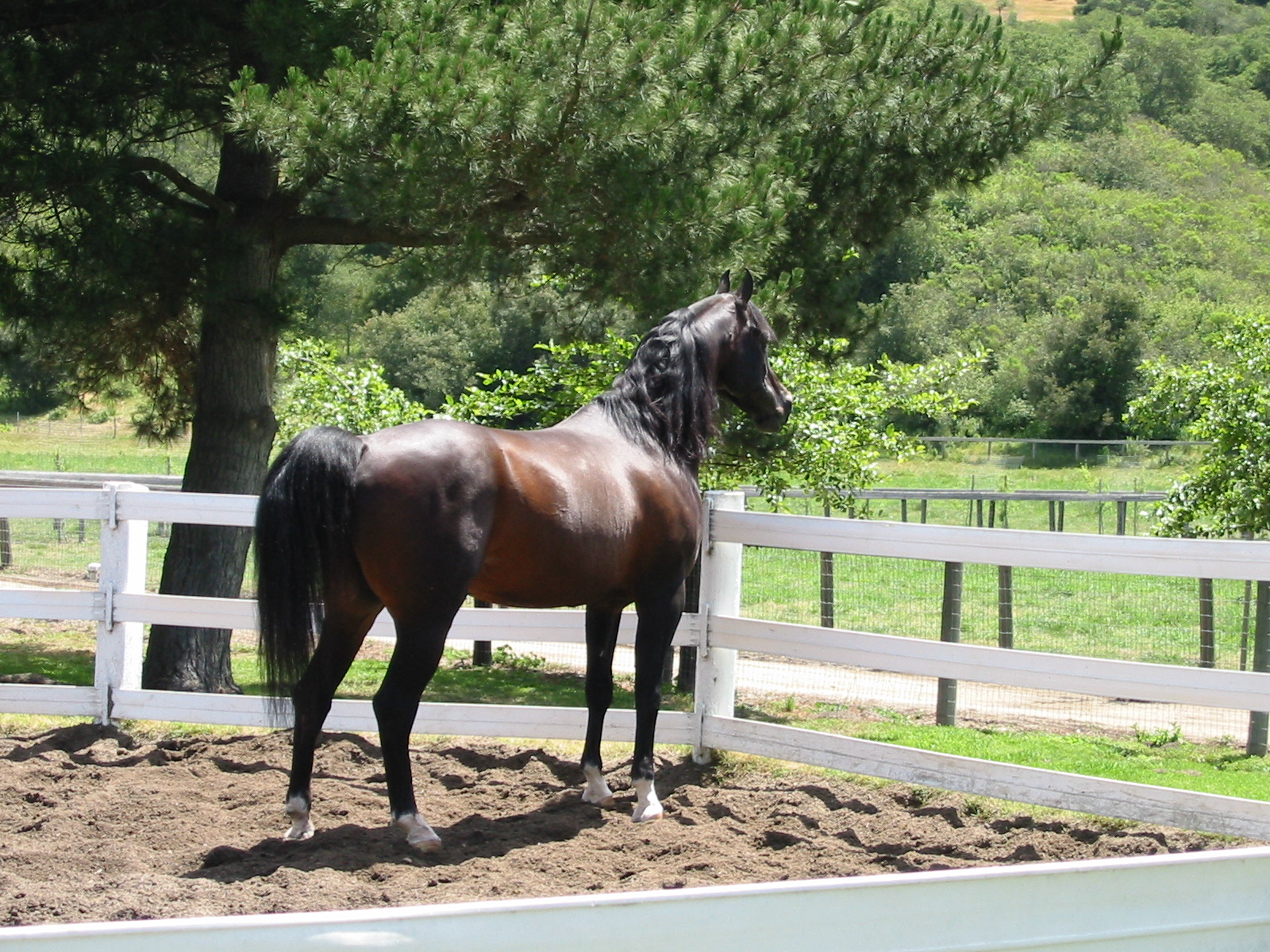
Desperado V at age 16

By 1961, Varian Arabians had a small number of mares. The most notable of her early champions was Ronteza, a daughter of the stallion Witez II out of the mare Ronna. Ronteza was the second Arabian Varian purchased, and she trained the mare herself. The pair, undefeated in competition against other Arabian horses, went on to beat 50 horses of all breeds to win the 1961 Reined Cow Horse championship at the Cow Palace in San Francisco, California. Varian was aware that both Farlotta and Ronteza were sired by stallions imported from Poland, out of American-bred mares, and believed this bloodline cross was a major source for the good qualities of these mares. Thus, Varian looked for Polish-bred Arabian mares to breed to her American-bred Bay-Abi. However, Poland was at that time an Iron Curtain nation, and importing horses from there directly to America was quite complicated.

To accomplish her goal, Varian sought the assistance of British horse breeder Patricia Lindsay, who traveled to Poland and purchased three mares on Varian's behalf. The mares arrived in California in December 1961. They were Bachantka (sired by Wielki Szlem out of Balalajka, who was by Amurath Sahib), purchased from the Albigowa stud; Ostroga (Duch × Orda by Omar 11), from the Nowy Dwór stud; and Naganka (Bad Afas × Najada by Fetysz), from the Michalow stud. Bachantka and Naganka had been trained and raced in Poland. Bachantka had a record of 2/15 (0-1-3), and Naganka a record of 2/12 (3-4-1). After her arrival in the USA, Bachantka also had a brief but successful horse show career.

Crossing Bay-Abi on these imported Polish mares proved particularly successful for Varian. As of 2016, the Varian ranch bred nine generations of horses descended from these foundation mares, and stood six successive generations of stallions descended from Bay Abi. The cross produced, among other champions, Varian's successor to Bay-Abi, the 1969 colt Bay el Bey (Bay Abi × Naganka), who was U.S. Reserve National Champion stallion twice, 1977 Canadian National Champion stallion, and a regional champion in English pleasure. At the time, the Arabian industry had little interest in western disciplines, so Varian competed with her horses in English riding classes. Of Bay el Bey, she commented, "He could easily have been an open reining horse, but I made him into an English pleasure horse because he could do it, he was so athletic." Her English champions also included Bay el Bey's full brother, Mikado, a gray stallion who was a champion park horse.

"Bay el Bey changed the Arabian horse in America and then in the rest of the world"

— Mike Nichols

Bay el Bey was best known for his offspring, who collectively earned him the nickname, "The Kingmaker." He sired 441 foals including three sons considered his finest: his own successor at Varian Arabians, Huckleberry Bey (whose dam was Taffona, a daughter of Raffon); U.S. Reserve National Champion Bey Shah (out of Star of Ofir, who was by Bask); and Barbary (out of Balalinka (Bask x Bachantka)), who won a total of seven national titles in halter and park horse competition. Barbary was purchased from Varian as a yearling by film producer and Arabian owner Mike Nichols. These three sons of Bay el Bey alone sired a combined total of 650 champions.

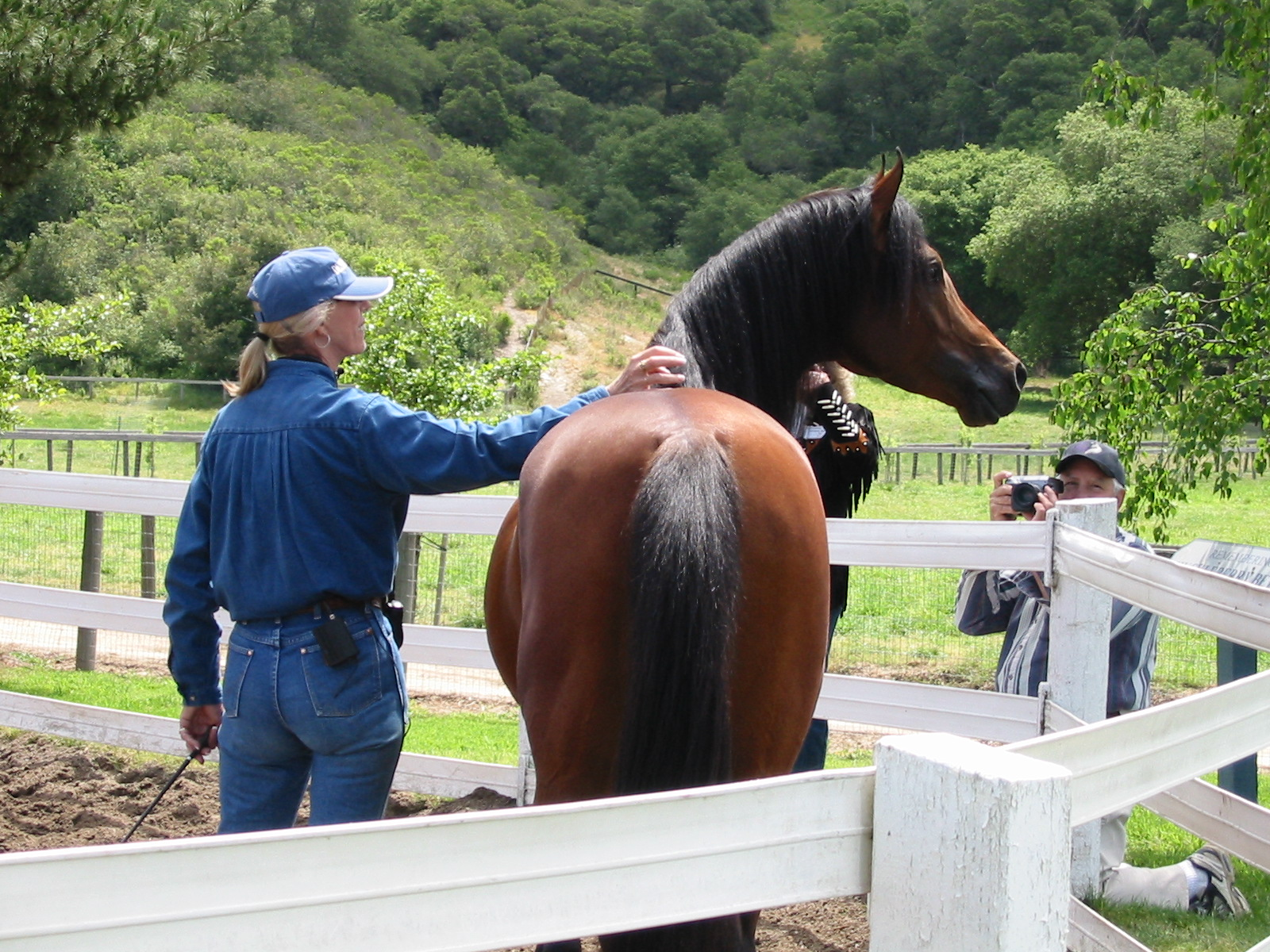
Jullyen El Jamaal with Sheila Varian

Subsequent generations of Varian stallions continued the pattern of winning in the show ring and then producing champion show horses across multiple disciplines. Huckleberry Bey was 1979 U.S. National Reserve Champion Futurity Stallion, 1981 U.S. National Top Ten Stallion, and 1984 U.S. National Reserve Champion English Pleasure. He then became the leading sire of US National Champions for five years, and in 1999 his likeness was reproduced as a Breyer horse model. In turn, his son, Desperado V (× Daraska by Dar) became a leading sire of champions. In 2004 and 2005, Desperado V was ranked the leading Arabian sire by the United States Equestrian Federation (USEF), and was second in 2008 and 2009. By 2009, Desperado V had sired 75 national winners. In addition, another Huckleberry Bey son, Bravado Bey V (× Bachista V) was USEF's 10th-ranked leading Arabian sire in 2008.

In 2010, of the top 25 leading sires of winning Arabian dressage horses since 1960, Desperado V was ranked number 2 (following Khemosabi), Bey Shah was number 4, Huckleberry Bey was tied for fifth, and Barbary was also on the list, in addition to five other grandsons of Bay El Bey.

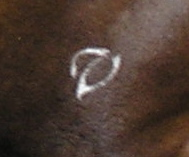
The stylized "V" freeze brand now identifies Varian-bred horses

Over the years, she made use of outside bloodlines. She leased the young, then unproven stallion Khemosabi for his first breeding season in 1969. She also made use of horses owned by other ranches, such as the Polish import Bask, whom she linebred to his 3/4 sister, Varian's Polish import Bachantka, producing another significant foundation mare, Balalinka, dam of Barbary. In 2002, requiring an outcross stallion not closely related to her own horses, she purchased the Brazilian-foaled Jullyen El Jamaal, who has bloodlines not previously incorporated into the Varian program, as well as a line tracing back to Bay el Bey via Bey Shah. Varian continued to seek performance ability in her mares; in the Varian program, every mare is trained under saddle and must prove suitable as a riding animal.

Varian did not originally work her ranch name into the names of her horses, but today all Varian-bred horses have a registered name suffixed with the capital letter "V". The Varian ranch also acknowledges the importance of the mares by using the first letter of each mare's name to start the name of their foals. Varian-bred horses are freeze branded with the Varian "V" logo.

== Training philosophy and vaquero tradition ==
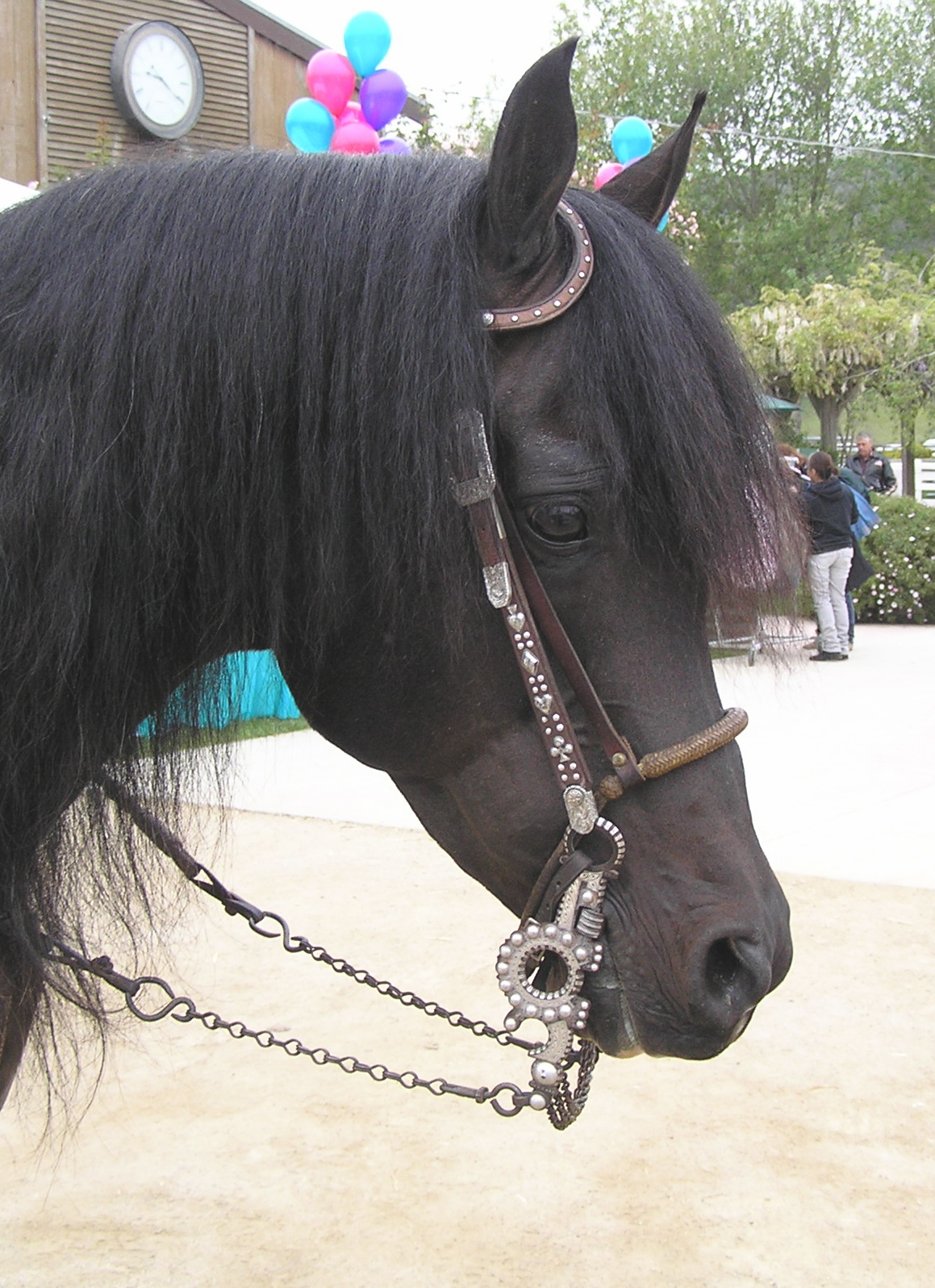
Varian stallion Maclintock V in vaquero style bridle

Vaqueros were the horsemen and cattle herders of Spanish Mexico, who first came to California with the Jesuit priest Eusebio Kino in 1687, with two expeditions in 1769, and the Juan de Anza expedition in 1774. They were the first cowboys in the region. She learned horse training methods that derived from this tradition. In her teens, she was mentored in horsemanship by Morgan horse breeder and cattle rancher Mary "Sid" Spencer. The Spencer property, called Forsyth Ranch, was near Arroyo Grande on land that is now under Lopez Lake. Spencer helped Varian learn the underlying principles of training and riding horses, how to work cattle in the mountains, and introduced her to vaquero training methods. Spencer also did all of her own ranch work including shoeing, gelding, horse training, baling hay, and truck repairs. She learned how to handle well-trained horses by riding one of the Spencer family's finished Morgans, a gelding named Little Horse. With Spencer's help, she also learned to recognize correct conformation and balance in horses.

After learning traditional vaquero methods of training from Spencer and others, Varian modified her training methods in her twenties, after meeting Tom Dorrance. He introduced her to his "soft approach" of working with horses, and his methods were an additional influence on Varian's training philosophy. Varian utilized vaquero-influenced methods in training her horses, but believed that modern well-bred horses need a gentler approach, stating, "All good horses, like smart children, need good instruction, but they don't need harsh instruction."

Varian was one of a very few experts in the 21st century who was still teaching about vaquero equipment, methods, and history. She had a strong interest in the history of the spade bit horse in California. The spade is an elaborate, complex bit that can only be properly used on a highly trained horse handled by a skilled rider. In the vaquero tradition, its use represents the highest level of trust and communication between horse and rider. The process of training the spade bit horse takes five to seven years to complete. Its emphasis has always been on producing a finely tuned working horse and partner, emphasizing quality rather than on how quickly the goal is reached. The conformation of the horse is also a factor; to become a spade bit horse, the animal must be bred to have a higher neck set and well-carried head. Varian compared the ride and handling of a horse trained in this manner to that of a Jaguar automobile.

It is a spring day, 70 degrees, and I'm on a good horse, moving cattle off a mountain. That is perfect happiness.

— Sheila Varian

Traditionally, the vaquero method starts a young horse using a hackamore, which is headgear that uses a heavy rawhide noseband, called a bosal instead of a bit to control the horse. As the horse gains skill with a rider, it moves to lighter bosals, and next into a transitional period in its training; carrying a bridle with a type of curb bit called a "half breed" which is a modified spade bit worn in conjunction with a light bosal. The rider carries two sets of reins, one set on the bosal and one on the curb, giving this gear its name, the "two-rein." After several years in a two-rein, the horse graduates into the spade bit.

Varian departed slightly from tradition. She started young horses under saddle at the age of three, beginning with a bridle and a snaffle bit because it sends clearer signals to a young horse, particularly one of sensitive disposition. She then introduced the traditional hackamore, and, after a couple of months to transition between the hackamore and the snaffle, began teaching neck reining, which allows a horse to be ridden one-handed. After a year or two, when the horse became light in the hackamore, she introduced the young horse to the two-rein, using a light bosal with either a "half-breed" or a low-port curb bit. Once the horse understood the bit, the bosal was removed and the horse was ridden in just the curb bit for a while until ready to go into the full spade bit, at which point the horse went back into the two-rein when the spade is first introduced. She introduced horses to the spade bit at the age of seven or eight, if they had suitable conformation and temperament to carry it. When she selected and fully trained a spade bit horse for her own personal use, that particular horse stayed with her for life and was never sold.

Varian considered Arabians the most "people-oriented" of any horse breed. "No other horse will leave his food to come and see you." Noting that they are a "hot-blooded" breed, she viewed them as sensitive horses that will not tolerate harsh handling, but strongly disagreed with those who considered Arabians to be too high-spirited to be good trail horses. She emphasized teaching horses to have good manners. She roped off of her horses and took them into the mountains.

She viewed Arabians as requiring a smart and gentle approach. She advocated for trainers who used the methods of master horsemen such as Ray Hunt and Tom Dorrance, with Dorrance's philosophy being especially suitable for Arabians. She considered the breed to be inherently gentle, and pointed out that any horse can become "hot" if they are kept in a stall 24 hours a day, fed a lot of grain, and never ridden. Varian explained the nature of Arabian horses by analogy, comparing them to precocious children who show their ability with delight, but cannot be bullied or pushed around.

== Legacy and awards ==
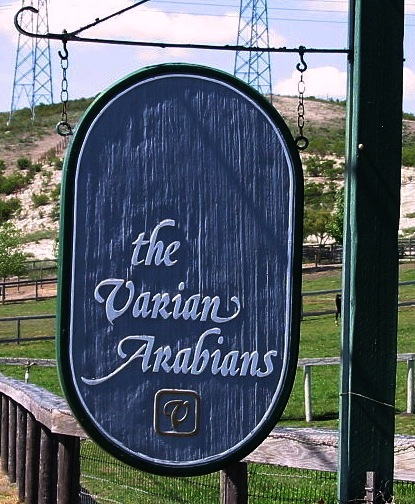
Ranch sign

The Varian Arabian Ranch has been ranked multiple times as one of the leading Arabian breeders of winning horses by the United States Equestrian Federation (USEF), which since 2004 (Note: USEF only began tracking leading breeders in 2004) has ranked breeders based on points earned by horses shown in sanctioned USEF competitions. The ranch was first in calendar year 2008, and in the top ten from 2006 through 2010. In 2013, the Varian breeding program was ranked by Arabian Horse World magazine as the all time number one breeder of both English-type and Western-type Arabian horses. Sheila Varian as an individual was honored by the USEF with the 2001 Ellen Scripps Davis Memorial Breeders' Cup, awarded to an individual who consistently breeds outstanding show horses. Within the Arabian industry itself, Varian was honored in 2005 with the Arabian Breeders Association's lifetime achievement award, and was the Arabian Professional & Amateur Horseman's Association 2009 Breeder of the Year.

Varian was inducted into the Cowgirl Hall of Fame in 2003. She was honored for both her contributions as a horse breeder and as a trainer, but the honor represented, in many ways, her roots in the vaquero tradition. Other inductees that year included western artist Glenna Goodacre; musician, artist, cowboy poet and pickup rider Ann Secrest Hanson; and classic cowgirl trick rider and barrel racer Velda Tindall Smith (1908–1990).

USEF rankings	Placing
Leading Arabian breeder 2004	19th
Leading Arabian breeder 2005	18th* (Note: Ranking 18th for 2005 is unofficial. In that year some horses were recorded with Sheila Varian as breeder, with 316 points, officially ranking 24th; others recorded with Varian Arabians as breeder, with 176 points, officially ranked 31st. The combined total of 492 points places the Varian breeding program 18th in point standings)
Leading Arabian breeder 2006	6th
Leading Arabian breeder 2007	7th
Leading Arabian breeder 2008	1st
Leading Arabian breeder 2009	4th
Leading Arabian breeder 2010	3rd
Leading Arabian breeder 2011	11th
Leading Arabian breeder 2012	11th
Leading Arabian breeder 2013	17th
Leading Arabian breeder 2014	7th
Leading Arabian breeder 2015	77th

In November 2015, Varian announced that she would be working with the California Rangeland Trust to place her ranch into a conservation easement to protect it from development. She had begun the project with the intent that her longtime ranch manager, Angela Alvarez, would operate the horse breeding program after Varian was no longer able to do so, and then once Alvarez was no longer able to run the ranch, the property would be gifted to the Trust to be sold, the conservation easement running with the land, and attempts made to find a buyer that would also be interested in maintaining the Arabian horse breeding program.

Varian was diagnosed with ovarian cancer in 2013 and died on March 6, 2016, at the age of 78. At news of her death, the web site for the California Rangeland Trust crashed due to the high amount of web traffic, necessitating supporters of the trust to set up a backup crowdfunding site for donations to the conservation effort.

== See also ==
- Russell and Sigurd Varian, uncles of Sheila Varian
- John Osborne Varian, grandfather of Sheila Varian
