= Ronteza =

Bay Arabian mare

- Breed: Arabian horse
- Sire: Witez II
- Grandsire: Ofir
- Dam: Ronna
- Maternal grandsire: Faronek
- Sex: Mare
- Foaled: 1954
- Country: USA
- Color: Bay
- Breeder: Donald L. Jones
- Owner: Sheila Varian
- Trainer: Sheila Varian

Honors
- Champion Reined Cow Horse

Ronteza (1954–1982) was a bay Arabian mare who was the first of her breed to win the Grand Champion Reined Cow Horse class. She was sired by Witez II, out of Ronna.

== Ancestry ==
Ronteza was by Witez II, an accomplished sire, and out of Ronna, who had been a successful hackamore horse.

Witez II had been imported from Poland. When Nazi Germany invaded his country in 1939, he was only a yearling, living at the Janów Podlaski Stud Farm. He and Lotnik, amongst many other stallions, were rescued during World War II in a famous raid. Witez was by Ofir out of Federacja. Ofir was by Kuhalian-Haifi, a desert-bred stallion who had been imported from the Jauf region of the Arabian peninsula by Prince Roman Sanguszko of the Gumniska Stud. Federacja was a mare from Poland with bloodlines tracing back to that of the Balbona Stud in Hungary.

Ronteza was very distantly related to the famed Bask. Ofir's first foal crop was in 1938 and contained three colts who became sires of significance of the Arabian breed. They were: Witez II, Witraz (sire of Bask), and Wielki Szlem, a notable broodmare sire. Ofir and Federacja were also amongst those of the horses of Janow who were taken by the Russians during the Soviet invasion of Poland. Later in his life, Ofir was taken to the Tersk Stud at the USSR where he sired Mammona, a dam of significance in numerous Russian bloodlines.

Her grandsire, Faronek, was 50% Crabbet.

== Life and career ==
At the age of 2, Ronteza was sold to Sheila Varian. At Varian's farm in Arroyo Grande, California, she accompanied the mare Farlotta (Lotnik x Farza) who was a finished spade bit horse. Much like Farlotta, Ronteza was trained in the "old-fashioned", vaquero way and eventually ended up being a successful reining horse. By the time Ronteza was 4, she'd participated in her first hackamore competition coming out with third, and coming out undefeated in Arabian hackamore shows afterward. She went on to compete in shows offered by the California Reined Cow Horse Association, which were mainly dominated by the Quarter Horse breed.

Although being at a disadvantage due to her small size, in October 1961, Ronteza went on to compete at the Cow Palace competition in San Francisco, where she was up against 50 other horses. They placed first in the lightweight eliminations and went on to division finals. Towards the end of her final run, Ronteza slipped and fell while circling her cow, but because her rider, Varian, hadn't fallen off, they remained in the competition. After finishing, Ronteza was announced the winner of the Cow Palace competition, making her the first Arabian horse to win that title, along with making Sheila the first female rider to have that honor.

When she was 10 years old in 1964, Ronteza retired as a broodmare, becoming the foundation of Varian's farm. During that time, she produced 11 foals, all but two of which were sired by Bay-Abi, who was of Crabbet descent, and a national halter champion. The others were by Bay-Abi's son, Bay El Bey.

Ronteza died at the age of 28.

== Pedigree ==
Kuhalian-Haifi (PASB); Imp. Arabia, 1931
Ofir (PASB) (Polish Arabian Stud Book)
Dziwa (PASB)
Witez II (PASB) (Polish Arabian Stud Book)
Burgas (PASB)
Federacja (PASB)
Koalicja (PASB), Imp Babolna, 1919
Ronteza; 1938 bay mare
Ronek (AHR)
Faronek (AHR)
Farhan (AHR)
Ronna (AHR) (Arabian Horse Registry)
Abdullah (AHR)
Kiswah (AHR)
Kahawi (AHR)
