= Spade bit =

Spade bit may refer to:

- Spade bit (horse) used on horses
- Drill bit#Wood spade bit used on a drill
