= Rancho Arroyo Grande =

Mexican land grant in California

Coordinates: 35.190°N 120.430°W

Rancho Arroyo Grande was a 4,437-acre (17.96 km^{2}) Mexican land grant in present day San Luis Obispo County, California given in 1842 by Governor Juan Alvarado to Zeferino Carlón. The grant extended along Arroyo Grande Creek east of present day Arroyo Grande. Much of the grant is now covered by Lopez Lake.

== History ==
José Antonio Zeferino Carlón (also Cortés) (1792-) was a soldier and blacksmith. An illegitimate son, he used the surnames of his stepfathers, Hilario Carlón and Felipe Cortés. He was at Mission La Purísima Concepción in 1820. He married first María Antonia Valenzuela in 1811. After she died, he married second María Dominga Cota in 1813. Their daughter María Manuela Carlón (1815-) married Francis Ziba Branch in 1835. Zeferino Carlon was granted Rancho Arroyo Grande in 1842. In 1850, Zeferino married third María Magdalena Valenzuela. Zeferino sold Rancho Arroyo Grande to his daughter and son-in-law, Francis Branch.

With the cession of California to the United States following the Mexican-American War, the 1848 Treaty of Guadalupe Hidalgo provided that the land grants would be honored. As required by the Land Act of 1851, a claim for Rancho Arroyo Grande was filed with the Public Land Commission in 1852, and the grant was patented to Francis Branch in 1867.

== See also ==
- Ranchos of California
- List of Ranchos of California
