= Obispeño language =

Extinct Chumashan language of California

Obispeño
- tiłhini
- Native to: United States
- Region: Californian coastal areas
- Ethnicity: yak titʸu titʸu yak tiłhini Northern Chumash
- Extinct: 1917, with the death of Rosario Cooper
- Revival: 21st century
- Language family: Chumashan: Obispeño
- Dialects: Northern; Southern

Language codes
- ISO 639-3: obi
- Glottolog: obis1242
- Obispeño

- Obispeño is classified as Extinct by the UNESCO Atlas of the World's Languages in Danger.

Obispeño (also known as tiłhini) is one of the extinct Chumash Native American languages previously spoken along the coastal areas of California. The primary source of documentation on the language is from the work of linguist J. P. Harrington.

== Classification ==
Obispeño is classified as the sole member of the northern branch of the Chumashan language family. It has two dialects, a northern and southern dialect.

== Geographic distribution ==
Obispeño was spoken in the region of San Luis Obispo, California.

== Orthography ==
The yak titʸu titʸu yak tiłhini Northern Chumash Tribe uses an alphabet based on the International Phonetic Alphabet (and the Americanist phonetic notation) to transcribe Obispeño.
