= Yak titʸu titʸu yak tiłhini Northern Chumash Tribe =

Unrecognized tribe in California

yak titʸu titʸu yak tiłhini Northern Chumash Tribe
- Formation: Nonprofit: 2010
- Tax ID no.: EIN 27-4006315
- Legal status: active
- Location: San Luis Obispo, California, United States
- Official language: English, tɨnɨsmuʔụ tiłhin kʔititʸu
- Subsidiaries: ytt Northern Chumash Nonprofit
- Website: yttnorthernchumashtribe.com

The yak titʸu titʸu yak tiłhini Northern Chumash Tribe, also known as the YTT Northern Chumash Tribe, is an organization based in California. The Northern Chumash Tribe is not a state-recognized or federally recognized American Indian tribe. Their headquarters are in San Luis Obispo.

== Status ==
California has 109 federally recognized tribes, no state-recognized tribes, and more than 50 unrecognized tribes. The YTT Northern Chumash Tribe has no federal recognition.

The California Native American Heritage Commission lists the YTT Northern Chumash Tribe as an affiliated tribe of San Luis Obispo County.

== Nonprofit ==
The YTT Northern Chumash formed a nonprofit organization in 2011 with the mission "to support yak tityu tity yak tilhini Northern Chumash Tribe in all matters concerning tribal affairs." The nonprofit's focus includes cultural awareness, language preservation, traditional knowledge, food security, and protecting sacred sites.

Wendy Lucas serves as the president, and Kelsey Shaffer serves as the vice president.

== Activities ==
Three programs of the YTT Northern Chumash Tribe are cultural burns, language revitalization, and land back, that in restoring and stewarding historical homelands.

== Notable members ==
- Sarah Biscarra-Dilley, writer, curator

== See also ==
- Chumash people
- Rosario Cooper (tiłhini Chumash, 1845–1917), last known speaker of the tiłhini language
- List of organizations that self-identify as Native American tribes
