= Rancho Jesús María =

Land grant in California

Coordinates: 34.760°N 120.550°W

Rancho Jesus Maria was a 42,185-acre (170.72 km^{2}) Mexican land grant in present-day northern Santa Barbara County, California, given in 1837 by Governor Juan B. Alvarado to Lucas Antonio Olivera and José Antonio Olivera. The grant extended along the Pacific coast from Shuman Canyon south to the Santa Ynez River. It is the site of the present day Vandenberg Air Force Base.

== History ==
Lucas Antonio and José Antonio Olivera sold the land grant to José Valenzuela in 1839, who, in 1847, sold a one-third share to Pedro Catarino Carrillo and a one-third share to Lewis T. Burton.

Pedro Catarino Carrillo (1818 –1888), a son of Carlos Antonio Carrillo, was educated in Honolulu and Boston. He was appointed collector of customs at San Diego and Santa Barbara, and also held the offices of alcalde and town surveyor of Santa Barbara, and justice of the peace of Los Angeles. Pedro Carrillo married Maria Josefa Ramona Bandini (1823–1896) in 1841.

Lewis (Luis) T. Burton (1809–1879) of Tennessee came overland with the Wolfskill party to California in 1831 and arrived in the Santa Barbara area shortly thereafter to trap otter. In 1839, he married Maria Antonia Carrillo (1822–1843), (daughter of Carlos Antonio Carrillo) and sister of Pedro C. Carrillo. Burton served under John C. Frémont, and was the first American Mayor of Santa Barbara in 1850. In 1846, Burton bought Rancho Bolsa de Chamisal. Burton Mesa and Burton Mound are named for him.

With the cession of California to the United States following the Mexican-American War, the 1848 Treaty of Guadalupe Hidalgo provided that the land grants would be honored. As required by the Land Act of 1851, a claim for Rancho Jesus Maria was filed with the Public Land Commission in 1852, and the grant was patented to Lewis T. Burton and José Carrillo in 1871.

Lewis Burton kept buying the various shares in Rancho Jesus Maria, and upon Burton’s death in 1879, his son, Ben Burton, inherited all of Rancho Jesus Maria. Edwin Jessop Marshall, a businessman with land holdings in California, Arizona, and Mexico acquired Rancho Jesus Maria in 1906. In 1941, the Marshall estate sold the rancho to the United States government for use as a military facility; it is now Vandenberg Space Force Base.

== See also ==
- Ranchos of California
- List of Ranchos of California
