= Cypress Ridge Golf Course =

Golf course in Arroyo Grande, California, US

- Location within California
- 35.0833°N 120.5736°W

Club information
- Location: Arroyo Grande, California, United States
- Established: 1999
- Type: Public
- Total holes: 18
- Website: Cypress Ridge Website

Cypress Ridge Golf Course
- Designed by: Peter Jacobsen Signature Golf Course, designed by Jacobsen Hardy Design

Cypress Ridge Golf Course is located in Arroyo Grande, California—which is on the Central Coast of California. The golf course is a Peter Jacobsen Signature Golf Course, designed by Jacobsen Hardy Design. In its design and conception, Jacobsen Hardy utilized the natural surroundings of the area to make this central coast golf course truly unique. The golf course opened in 1999. It is rated 4½ stars by Golf Digest "Best Places to Play".

Situated in San Luis Obispo County, in the town of Arroyo Grande, putting Cypress Ridge on the Central Coast of California. Nearby is Pismo Beach as well as wine country in Paso Robles, San Luis Obispo, and the Santa Ynez Valley.
