= Bay-Abi =

Arabian stallion

- Breed: Arabian horse
- Sire: Errabi
- Grandsire: Arabi Kabir
- Dam: Angyl
- Maternal grandsire: Raseyn
- Sex: Stallion
- Foaled: April 22, 1957
- Country: USA
- Color: Bay
- Breeder: Lloyd and Mary Silva
- Owner: Sheila Varian
- Trainer: Sheila Varian

Awards
- National Champion Western Pleasure National Champion Halter stallion National Champion English Pleasure

Honors
- 1964 Scottsdale Res Champ English Pleasure

Bay-Abi (April 22, 1957-1984) was a bay Arabian stallion who was a foundation sire for Varian Arabians, and national halter champion. He was sired by Errabi, out of Angyl.

== Ancestry ==
Bay-Abi was by Errabi, and out of Angyl, who was a national US Top Ten Halter Mare.

Errabi was a champion stud who was killed at the age of 7. Through his damsire, Bay-Abi was a grandson of the Skowronek son Raseyn, who was part of a large shipment of horses that Carl Raswan, previously Carl Schmidt, purchased from Lady Wentworth of the Crabbet Arabian Stud for W.K. Kellogg's new ranch in Pomona, California.

Ofir was by Kuhalian-Haifi, a desert-bred stallion who had been imported from the Jauf region of the Arabian peninsula by Prince Roman Sanguszko of the Gumniska Stud. His first foal crop produced three Arabian sires of significance including: Witez II, Witraz (sire of Bask), and Wielki Szlem, a notable broodmare sire. Ofir was also among those of the horses of Janow who were taken by the Russians during the Soviet invasion of Poland. Later in his life, Ofir was taken to the Tersk Stud at USSR where he sired Mammona, a dam of significance in numerous Russian bloodlines.

He is 56.25% Crabbet, inheriting the bloodline from both sides.

== Life and career ==
At the age of 2, Bay-Abi was bought in auction by Sheila Varian, who was taken by his Polish bloodline. She described him by saying, "Bay-Abi was a clown. He was a very sensitive horse whose good spirits were easily wilted with a slap or yell, although it was easy to re-stimulate him with a voice filled with excitement. It got to be the method of correction that when Bay-Abi was naughty I picked a flower and gave him a gentle little smack with it; he always looked at me like I had just shot him, so I didn't play around with the flower smacking that much. It hurt his feelings."

Bay-Abi was trained in halter and performance. He won a championship at the Cow Palace competition in San Francisco at the age of 3, and in 1962 Varian took him to the US Arabian National Championships in Estes Park Colorado where he was named US National Champion Stallion; reportedly unanimous on all three judges’ cards. He was shown in Western and English pleasure two years later, winning U.S. National Top Ten awards. He was later awarded the Legion of Merit.

In all, Bay-Abi sired 275 purebred Arabians, 65 being champions, and 24 going on to become national winners. One of his most prominent included Bay El Bey, who was said to have changed the Arabian horse breed in America. He also the sire to most of the mare Ronteza's offspring. Ronteza was a foundation broodmare for Varian Farms.

Bay-Abi died at the age of 27.

== Pedigree ==
Image (AHR)
Arabi Kabir (AHR)
Kareyma (AHR)
Errabi (AHR) (Arabian Horse Registry)
Ferdin (AHR)
Ferdirah (AHR)
Sankirah (AHR)
Bay-Abi; 1957 bay stallion
Skowronek (PASB) (Polish Arabian Stud Book)
Raseyn (AHR)
Rayya (AHR)
Angyl (AHR) (Arabian Horse Registry)
Ofir (PASB)
Wierna (AHR)
Kamea (PASB)
