= Arroyo Grande Creek =

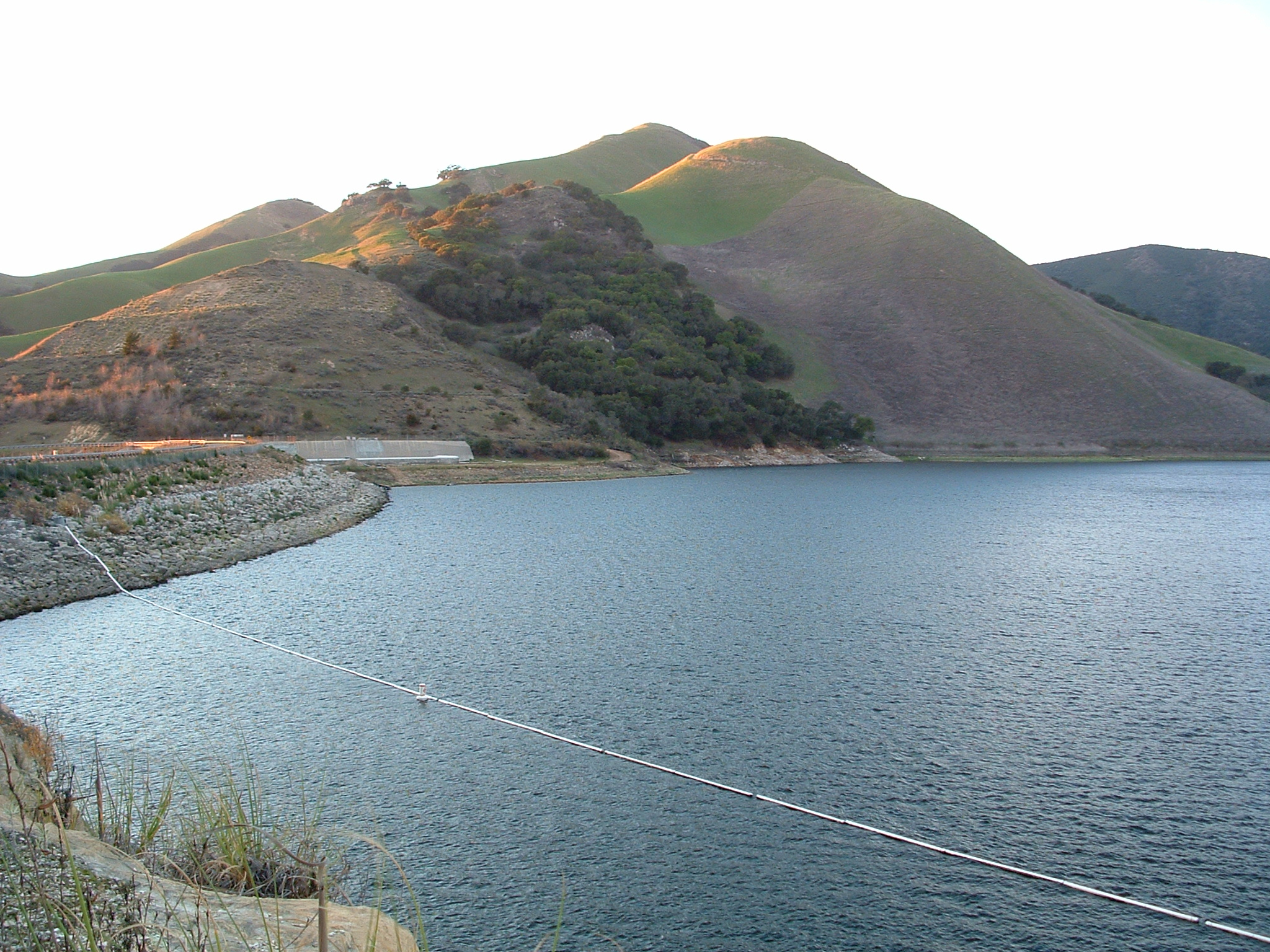
- Lopez Lake and Dam on Arroyo Grande Creek

- Location of Arroyo Grande Creek in California

Location
- Country: United States
- State: California

Physical characteristics
- Source: Santa Lucia Range
  - location: North of Huasna
  - coordinates: 35°11′55″N 120°23′00″W
  - elevation: 1,307 ft (398 m)
- Mouth: Pacific Ocean
  - location: Pismo State Beach
  - coordinates: 35°06′03″N 120°37′52″W
  - elevation: 0 ft (0 m)
- Length: 22 mi (35 km)
- Basin size: 153 sq mi (400 km^{2})
- Discharge
  - location: above Arroyo Grande
  - average: 19.7 cu ft/s (0.56 m^{3}/s)
  - minimum: 0 cu ft/s (0 m^{3}/s)
  - maximum: 5,400 cu ft/s (150 m^{3}/s)

Arroyo Grande Creek is a major stream in San Luis Obispo County on the Central Coast of California. The creek flows 22 miles (35 km) in a southwesterly direction, from the Santa Lucia Range to the Pacific Ocean. It is a major source of water supply for southern San Luis Obispo County.

The creek's name is derived from the Spanish for "large watercourse", and was sometimes called the "Roaring Grande" in the 19th century due to its propensity for flooding. The city of Arroyo Grande, established in 1867, was named after the stream.

== Course ==
Arroyo Grande Creek begins in the southern foothills of the Santa Lucia Range, just outside the Los Padres National Forest. It flows west through ranches and farms, and is joined by Saucelito Creek and Phoenix Creek from the left. The creek then flows into Lopez Lake, impounded by Lopez Dam about 13 miles (21 km) upstream from the mouth. Wittenberg and Lopez Canyon Creeks both originate in the Los Padres National Forest and flow into the lake from the north.

The creek turns southwest below Lopez Dam, where it enters the Arroyo Grande Valley. It flows through Biddle Regional Park and is joined from the left by Tar Springs Creek, just above the city of Arroyo Grande. Los Berros Creek joins from the left just downstream of Arroyo Grande. After flowing through Arroyo Grande and Oceano the creek empties into the Pacific Ocean at Pismo State Beach, just north of the Pismo Dunes.

== Watershed ==
The Arroyo Grande Creek watershed drains 153 square miles (400 km^{2}) and is located wholly within San Luis Obispo County. Most of the watershed is hilly or mountainous, with wider valleys near the coast used for agriculture. Elevations range from sea level to 3,100 feet (940 m) in the upper reaches of Lopez Canyon. Principal vegetation communities are grassland, buckbrush and chamise chaparral; oak woodland occurs along streams and valleys. The average annual rainfall is 15 to 28 inches (380 to 710 mm).

== River modifications ==
Lopez Dam was built in 1968 by the San Luis Obispo County Flood Control and Water Conservation District, to provide drinking water for communities in the "Five Cities" area including the city of Arroyo Grande. Its reservoir, Lopez Lake, can store almost 50,000 acre-feet (62,000,000 m^{3}). The annual water yield of 8,730 acre-feet (10,770,000 m^{3}) is divided with approximately 52 percent going to local water agencies and 48 percent reserved for downstream releases. Lopez Dam is a total barrier to fish migration, and has contributed to the decline of steelhead populations in the creek.

Due to chronic flooding, the lower 3 miles (4.8 km) of Arroyo Grande Creek were channelized in 1959. Parts of tributaries, including Tar Springs and Los Berros Creeks, have also been channelized. Floodgates were installed to control water flow between Arroyo Grande Creek and Meadow Creek, a remainder of the once extensive coastal marsh system, in order to protect nearby homes.

== See also ==
- List of rivers of California
