= Rosario Cooper =

Last native speaker of the Northern Chumash language (1845–1917)

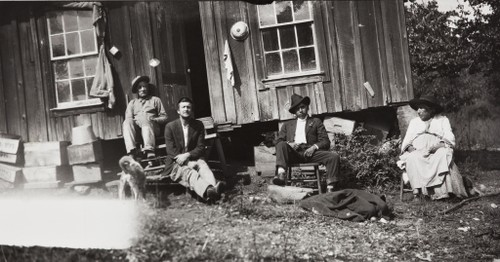
- Rosario Cooper, sitting outside her home near Arroyo Grande during her linguistic work with John P. Harrington; left to right: Mauro Soto (Rosario's husband), J. P. Harrington, Frank Olivas Jr. (Rosario's grandson), and Rosario Cooper
- Born: October 5, 1845
- Died: June 15, 1917 (aged 71)
- Known for: Last known speaker of the tiłhini language
- Children: Francisco Olivas
- Parent(s): Ana Maria Higuera and Valentin "Frank" Cooper

Rosario Cooper (1845–1917) was a yak titʸu titʸu yak tiłhini (Northern Chumash) woman who was the last known speaker of tiłhini (also known as Obispeño Chumash), though she had rarely spoken or heard it since her early childhood. During the last years of her life, Rosario worked with the linguist J.P. Harrington to recover what she could recall of her native language, and the pair were able to document some grammatical structure, place names, songs, and cultural knowledge before she died in 1917. Cooper is considered to be the last known speaker of Obispeño, though there has been some recent revitalization.

== Early life and family ==
Cooper was born on October 5, 1845. Her father was Dr. Valentin "Frank" Cooper a medical doctor from England her mother was Ana Maria Higuera from the La Purisima Mission located in what is known today as Santa Barbara County. After her mother died in 1851, Cooper was raised by her older sister Agostina. At the time of her work with Harrington, Cooper was married to her third husband, Mauro Soto, and they lived together in the Lopez Canyon area in Arroyo Grande. Cooper had at least three children, only one of whom survived infancy. Cooper's son, Francisco Olivas, born to William Olivas and Rosario Cooper, was a father to several children and grandchildren, many of whom still reside in California and carry on Cooper's legacy.

Cooper was baptized by a Franciscan priest in San Luis Obispo, and she practiced both Roman Catholic and Native beliefs. In addition, Cooper's work with Harrington revealed that she was interested in midwifery and had knowledge of native flora that could be used for healing purposes. Shortly before she died in 1917, Cooper helped to deliver one of her great-granddaughters.

== 1862 Homestead Act ==
Rosario Cooper applied for, and received, 160 acres of land allocated under the Homestead Act of 1862 in San Luis Obispo County. The application (Homestead Certificate 6143, Application 11463) was perfected on November 28, 1896. The Homestead Act of 1862 was detrimental to many Native Americans and was instrumental in the continued genocide of the Indigenous Natives of the United States.

== Work with anthropologist J.P. Harrington ==
From 1914 to 1916 for a total of around six or seven weeks, Cooper worked with the linguist J.P. Harrington to document what she could remember of her native language, Obispeño. Despite challenges facing Cooper and Harrington, such as Cooper's declining health and age and the fact that Cooper had probably not spoken or heard her native language since her childhood, the pair persisted in documenting linguistic and cultural knowledge about the indigenous people who once lived in what is now the area of San Luis Obispo County.

Harrington's primary focus as a linguist was the documentation of the Obispeño language and grammatical structure, but through their interviews they were also able to document cultural knowledge pertaining to indigenous material culture, diet and use of native flora and fauna, indigenous beliefs and practices, place names, and songs and dances. Cooper also related stories and experiences from her youth that reflected relationships and people in her life that had been important to her.

=== Material culture ===
From her childhood, Rosario recalled watching her mother and how she started fires using rotating sticks, and made hairbrushes embedded with glass beads to sell. She also described a game played with walnuts filled with brea by Yokuts natives.

=== Diet and use of native flora and fauna ===
Cooper also talked about traditional plant foods gathered and prepared by the native women in her life, such as islay and acorns. Given the proximity to the California coast, Rosario also reported indigenous uses of marine foods, such as collecting clams at Avila Beach and using sea urchins for food and medicinal purposes.

=== Indigenous spirituality and practices ===
During the interviews, Cooper told Harrington about indigenous uses and fears of spiritual practices, which, she reported, had resulted in the death of several of her half-siblings. Cooper also told Harrington a story about the time her own mother had been bewitched, and had then sought out the help of a medicine-man, who used techniques such as fasting, singing, and blood-letting to cure her.

Though Spanish introduction of Catholicism across California interrupted some native beliefs, Cooper said that the Chumash believed in the sun, moon, stars, Bear, and Coyote. Cooper also had recollections of older Chumash women offering sacrifices off the coast to marine animals such as dolphins and swordfish.

=== Place names ===
Cooper also related to Harrington the place name of tstʸɨwɨ, which was later used to identify the archaeological site at Pecho Creek. In 2015, an archaeological investigation was conducted by California Polytechnic State University, observed by Cooper's great-great-granddaughter, which revealed archaeological findings that gave important insight into how the indigenous lifestyles changed from pre-contact to post-contact times.

=== Songs and dances ===
During their time together, Harrington recorded Cooper talking and singing in Obispeño on wax cylinders. From her recollections, Rosario described singers and dancers she had known in her youth, and what they had passed on to her. Rosario sang 21 songs for Harrington, including the coyote and skunk songs. The swordfish dance she described included a costumed dancer who had a stick in each hand to hit together.

The wax cylinder recordings were transferred to tape during the Library of Congress' Federal Cylinder Project and can be accessed in the Smithsonian Institution archives.

== Legacy ==
Without the knowledge of Rosario Cooper and the collaboration of J.P. Harrington, the Obispeño language would have gone undocumented. Because of Cooper's collaboration and Harrington extensive field notes, a written record survives that modern students of the language can use as a resource. Cooper's legacy has also provided guidance and knowledge for her family and the yak titʸu titʸu yak tiłhini peoples, who have been able to revitalize the dances and songs described and sung by Cooper.

The Northern Chumash Tribe partnered with California Polytechnic State University in San Luis Obispo to work together and honor the tribe by using yak titʸu titʸu yak tiłhini village names for the university's new residential community called yakʔitʸutʸu, which opened in fall of 2018.

== See also ==
- List of last known speakers of languages
