= Rancho Santa Manuela =

Land grant in California

Coordinates: 35.150°N 120.490°W

Rancho Santa Manuela was a 16,955-acre (68.61 km^{2}) Mexican land grant in present-day San Luis Obispo County, California given in 1837 by Governor Juan B. Alvarado to Francis Ziba Branch. The grant encompassed present-day Arroyo Grande.

== History ==
Francis Ziba Branch (1802–1874) came over land to California with Wolfskill party in 1831. In 1835 he married María Manuela Carlón, and in 1837, Governor Alvarado granted Branch, Rancho Santa Manuela.

With the cession of California to the United States following the Mexican-American War, the 1848 Treaty of Guadalupe Hidalgo provided that the land grants would be honored. As required by the Land Act of 1851, a claim for Rancho Santa Manuela was filed with the Public Land Commission in 1852, and the grant was patented to Francis Ziba Branch in 1868.

The Branch family lived on the land until 1879, when much of Rancho Santa Manuela was sold to Philip Biddle and his son John Biddle (1840–1891).

== See also ==
- Ranchos of California
- List of Ranchos of California
