= Arroyo Grande, California =

City in California, United States

- City
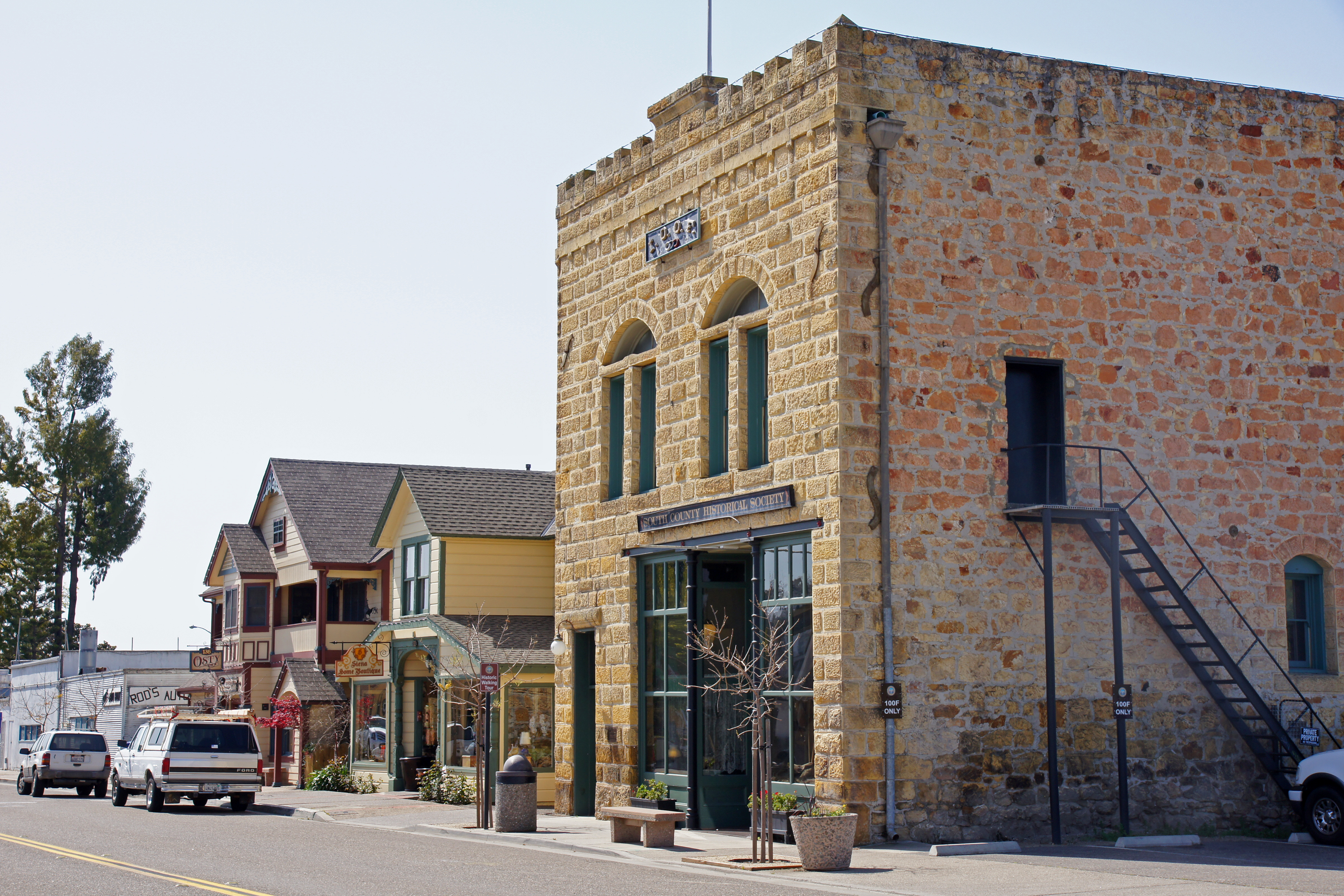
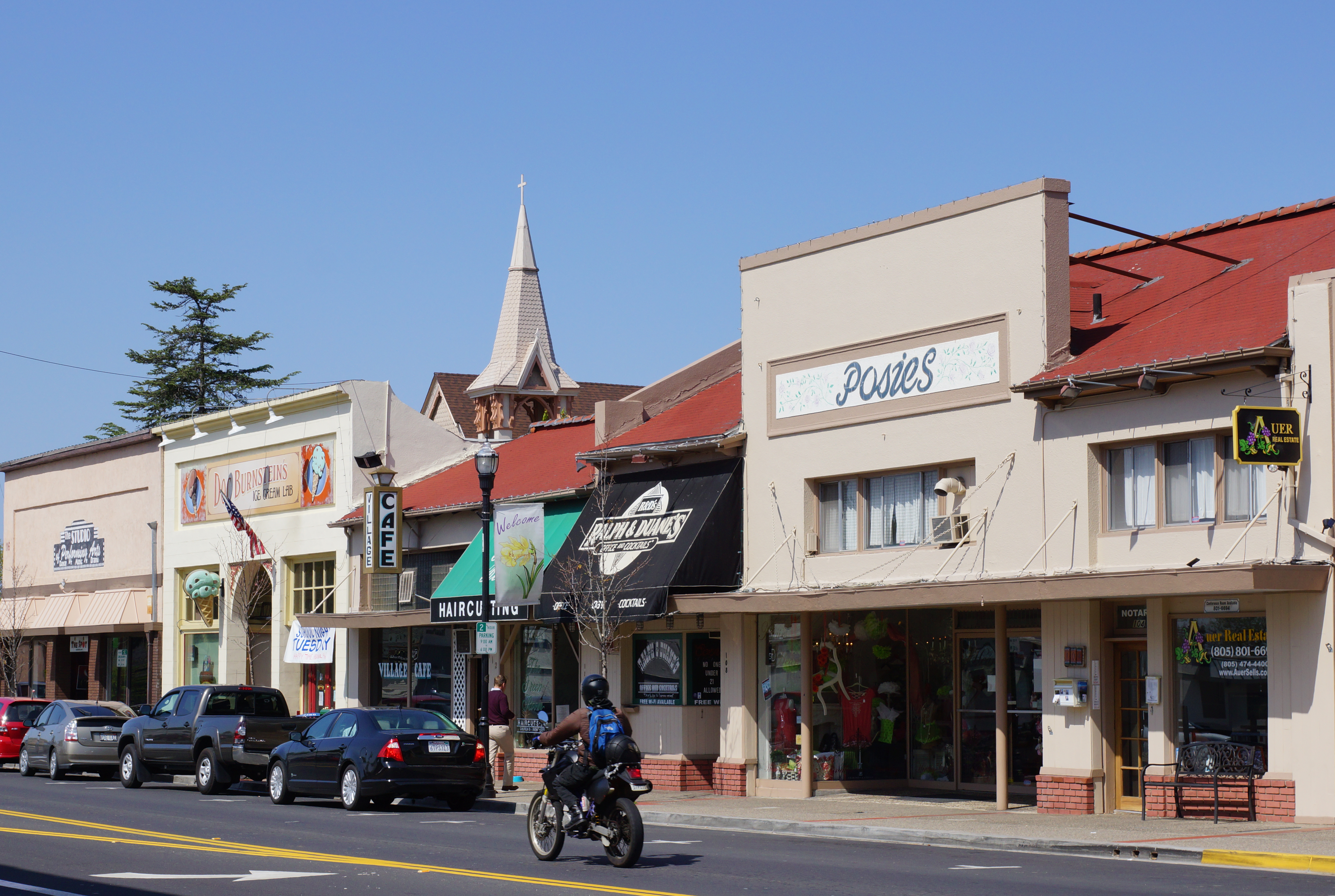
- Top: Arroyo Grande area; bottom: downtown

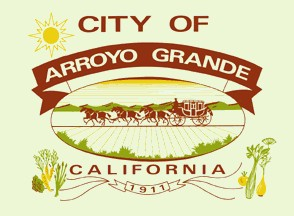
- Flag Seal
- Interactive map of Arroyo Grande, California
- Coordinates: 35°7′7″N 120°35′27″W
- Country: United States
- State: California
- County: San Luis Obispo
- Incorporated: July 10, 1911
- Named for: Spanish for "Big Creek"

Government
  - Type: Council–manager
  - Body: Arroyo Grande City Council
  - Mayor: Caren Ray Russom
  - City manager: Matthew Downing
  - City council: Kate Secrest; Aileen Loe; Jamie Maraviglia; Jim Guthrie
  - Assemblymember: Dawn Addis (D)
  - State senator: John Laird (D)
  - U.S. representative: Salud Carbajal (D)

Area
  - Total: 5.9391 sq mi (15.3822 km^{2})
  - Land: 5.9391 sq mi (15.3822 km^{2})
  - Water: 0 sq mi (0 km^{2}) 0%
- Elevation: 118 ft (36 m)

Population (2020)
  - Total: 18,441
  - Density: 3,105.0/sq mi (1,198.9/km^{2})
- Time zone: UTC−8 (Pacific (PST))
  - Summer (DST): UTC−7 (PDT)
- ZIP Codes: 93420–93421
- Area codes: 805 and 820
- FIPS code: 06-02868
- GNIS feature IDs: 1660271, 2409734
- Website: www.arroyogrande.org

Arroyo Grande (Spanish for "Big Creek") is a city in San Luis Obispo County, California, United States. It lies on the Central Coast, about 2 miles (3.2 km) inland from the Pacific Ocean, and is part of the Five Cities area. Its population was 18,441 at the 2020 census.

The Arroyo Grande Valley is within the traditional homeland of the Northern Chumash. The town developed as an agricultural center in the nineteenth century and incorporated in 1911. Its historic downtown, known as the Village, contains museums and a pedestrian suspension bridge over Arroyo Grande Creek. Agriculture, retail and tourism contribute to the local economy.

== History ==
=== Indigenous history ===
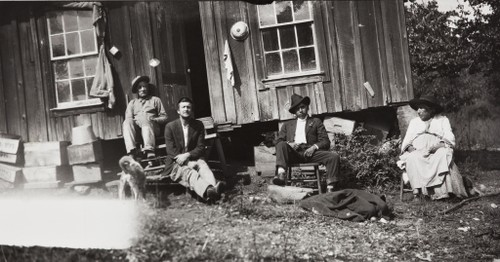
Rosario Cooper (right) outside her home near Arroyo Grande in 1916

Arroyo Grande lies in the traditional territory of the Northern Chumash, also known in historical sources as Obispeño Chumash. Chumash communities used coastal and inland resources and participated in regional trade. Shell beads and stone for making tools were among the items traded, and basketry was part of their material culture.

Spanish mission colonization, beginning in 1769, disrupted Chumash communities through disease, displacement and livestock grazing that depleted food resources. Survivors worked at the missions and on surrounding lands.

Rosario Cooper, a tiłhini-speaking Chumash woman, worked with linguist John P. Harrington at her home east of Arroyo Grande between 1912 and 1917. The yak titʸu titʸu yak tiłhini Northern Chumash Tribe identifies her contributions as a foundation for its language revitalization work. Harrington's records of her language, songs and recollections are held by the Smithsonian Institution. The tribe's name comes from those records.

Northern Chumash descendants continue to live in the region. Their work includes language and cultural education, land stewardship, and the use of traditional ecological knowledge in conservation. The yak titʸu titʸu yak tiłhini tribe describes its membership as families with continuing ancestral ties to San Luis Obispo County and the surrounding region.

=== Ranchos and town development ===
In the Mexican period, Francis Ziba Branch established Rancho Santa Manuela, where he built an adobe in 1841. Rancho Arroyo Grande was granted to Zeferino Carlón in 1842; Branch purchased it the following year.

The county established Arroyo Grande Township in 1862. Branch laid out the town in 1867, and businesses along Branch and Bridge streets served surrounding farms. The Pacific Coast Railway introduced regular passenger service in April 1883, while freight service provided an outlet for agricultural produce. The city incorporated on July 10, 1911.

=== Twentieth century ===
Japanese immigrants and their descendants farmed in the Arroyo Grande area. The Hayashi family, for example, cultivated more than 100 acres (40 ha) by 1942. That year, the federal government's incarceration of Japanese Americans forced the family from the area; those who returned after the war faced continuing prejudice. Approximately 200 people from Arroyo Grande were among those imprisoned at the Tulare detention facility in 1942.

Arroyo Grande's population grew from 3,291 in 1960 to 7,454 in 1970, 11,290 in 1980 and 14,378 in 1990. Regional wastewater infrastructure also expanded: the South San Luis Obispo County Sanitation District added secondary treatment in 1986 and increased plant capacity in 1990.

== Geography ==
Arroyo Grande occupies 5.939 square miles (15.38 km^{2}), all classified as land by the 2020 Census Gazetteer. The city adjoins Grover Beach, Pismo Beach and Oceano, with agricultural valleys and hills around its developed areas. It is one of the communities collectively known as the Five Cities, together with Grover Beach, Pismo Beach, Oceano and Shell Beach.

Arroyo Grande Creek and its tributaries provide riparian habitat. The surrounding landscape includes oak woodland, coastal scrub, grassland and cultivated land; coastal dunes and wetlands lie west of the city.

=== Climate ===
Arroyo Grande has a Mediterranean climate, with dry summers and wetter winters. The county's hazard mitigation plan uses the nearby Pismo Beach weather station to describe the South County climate. The following table gives that station's historical averages, rather than measurements within Arroyo Grande.

Climate data for Pismo Beach (regional station), July 1949 – June 2016
Month	Jan	Feb	Mar	Apr	May	Jun	Jul	Aug	Sep	Oct	Nov	Dec	Year
Mean daily maximum °F (°C)	63.3 (17.4)	64.7 (18.2)	65.9 (18.8)	68.0 (20.0)	68.8 (20.4)	70.1 (21.2)	70.0 (21.1)	70.7 (21.5)	72.0 (22.2)	71.8 (22.1)	68.5 (20.3)	64.4 (18.0)	68.2 (20.1)
Mean daily minimum °F (°C)	42.5 (5.8)	43.9 (6.6)	44.4 (6.9)	45.7 (7.6)	47.6 (8.7)	50.3 (10.2)	52.4 (11.3)	53.2 (11.8)	52.8 (11.6)	50.4 (10.2)	46.6 (8.1)	42.9 (6.1)	47.7 (8.7)
Average rainfall inches (mm)	3.48 (88)	3.42 (87)	2.80 (71)	1.38 (35)	0.34 (8.6)	0.07 (1.8)	0.03 (0.76)	0.02 (0.51)	0.25 (6.4)	0.74 (19)	1.92 (49)	2.50 (64)	16.96 (431)
Source: Western Regional Climate Center

== Demographics ==
Historical population
Census	Pop.	Note	%±
1890	466		—
1920	760		—
1930	892		17.4%
1940	1,090		22.2%
1950	1,723		58.1%
1960	3,291		91.0%
1970	7,454		126.5%
1980	11,290		51.5%
1990	14,378		27.4%
2000	15,851		10.2%
2010	17,252		8.8%
2020	18,441		6.9%
U.S. censuses; the 1890 figure is for the unincorporated village.

=== 2020 census ===
As of the 2020 census, Arroyo Grande had a population of 18,441 and a population density of 3,105.0 inhabitants per square mile (1,198.8/km^{2}).

Racial composition as of the 2020 census
Race	Number	Percent
White	13,595	73.7%
Black or African American	181	1.0%
American Indian and Alaska Native	160	0.9%
Asian	708	3.8%
Native Hawaiian and Other Pacific Islander	15	0.1%
Some other race	1,215	6.6%
Two or more races	2,567	13.9%
Hispanic or Latino (of any race)	3,646	19.8%

The census reported that 98.6% of residents lived in households, 0.9% lived in non-institutionalized group quarters, and 0.4% were institutionalized.

The median age was 46.1 years; 19.3% of residents were under the age of 18, 7.0% were ages 18 to 24, 22.3% were ages 25 to 44, 26.0% were ages 45 to 64, and 25.4% were 65 years of age or older. For every 100 females there were 90.2 males, and for every 100 females age 18 and over there were 86.8 males age 18 and over.

There were 7,438 households in Arroyo Grande, of which 27.6% had children under the age of 18 living in them. Of all households, 53.1% were married-couple households, 5.3% were cohabiting couple households, 27.6% had a female householder with no partner present, and 14.0% had a male householder with no partner present. About 26.5% of households were one person, and 15.2% were one person aged 65 or older. The average household size was 2.45. There were 5,010 families (67.4% of all households).

99.5% of residents lived in urban areas, while 0.5% lived in rural areas.

There were 7,979 housing units at an average density of 1,343.5 per square mile (518.7/km^{2}); 7,438 (93.2%) were occupied. Of the occupied units, 66.4% were owner-occupied and 33.6% were occupied by renters. The homeowner vacancy rate was 0.9% and the rental vacancy rate was 3.6%.

=== Income ===
In the 2019–2023 American Community Survey, the median household income was $103,258, and the per capita income was $50,203, both in 2023 dollars. About 2.0% of families and 4.6% of the population were below the poverty line.

== Economy ==
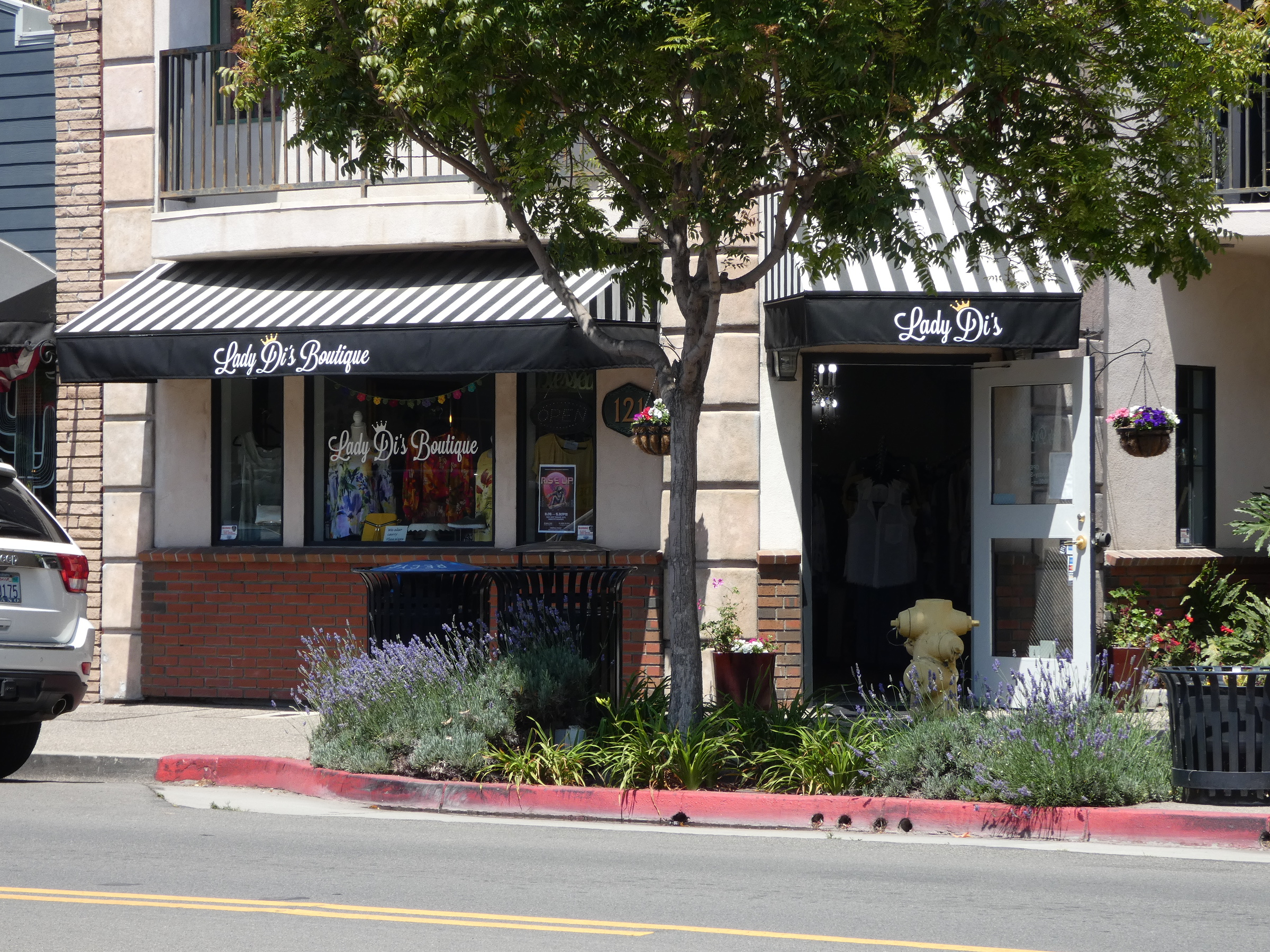
Shops in downtown Arroyo Grande

The city's economy includes agriculture, retail, tourism and small businesses. The Village is a commercial district as well as a center for cultural events; sales and lodging taxes contribute to municipal revenue. The Arroyo Grande Community Hospital provides health care in the Five Cities area.

The 2019–2023 American Community Survey estimated that 8,896 city residents aged 16 and older were employed. Educational services, health care and social assistance accounted for 24.7 percent of these workers; arts, entertainment, recreation, accommodation and food services accounted for 14.4 percent. These figures describe employed residents, including those working outside the city.

== Arts and culture ==
=== The Village ===
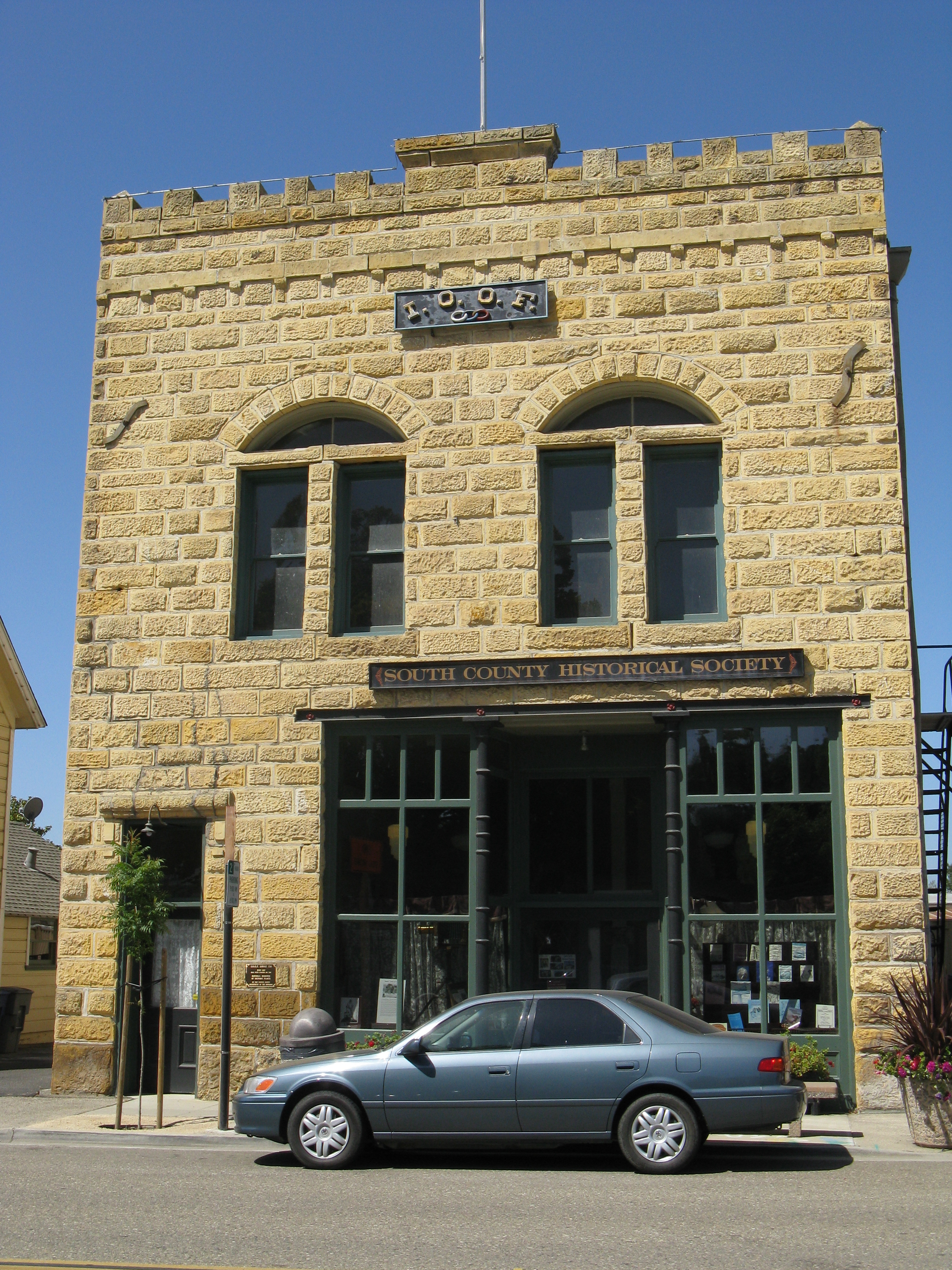
IOOF building in the Village

The historic downtown is known as the Village. Its Swinging Bridge crosses Arroyo Grande Creek at Centennial Park. The Short family built the original bridge in 1875 to connect parts of its property. The city-owned pedestrian bridge is 171 feet (52 m) long and approximately 40 feet (12 m) above the creek. Restoration work begun in May 2024 included repairs to the foundations, handrails and walkway. The bridge reopened on August 2, 2024, and a ribbon-cutting ceremony followed on September 13.

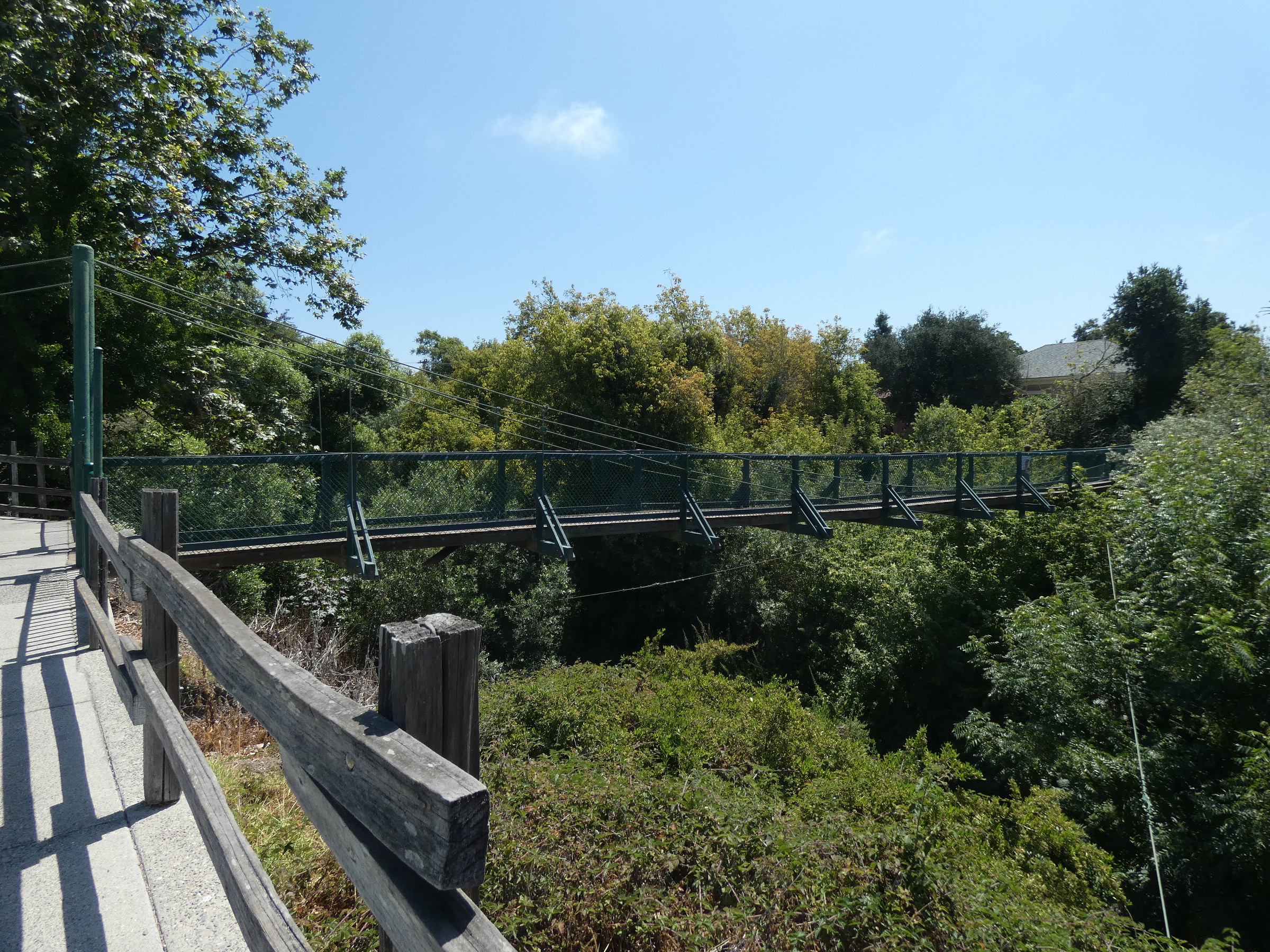
Pedestrian bridge in Arroyo Grande

The South County Historical Society operates five museums: Heritage House, the Santa Manuela Schoolhouse, the Paulding History House, the Barn Museum and the IOOF Hall. Its Patricia Loomis History Library holds local historical materials.

=== Performing arts and events ===
The Clark Center for the Performing Arts contains the 617-seat Forbes Hall and a smaller Studio Theatre. It hosts professional and community productions and displays local art in its lobby. The annual Harvest Festival includes a parade and agricultural exhibits. Summer concerts take place at the Rotary Bandstand in Heritage Square Park.

== Parks and recreation ==
Strother Park, beside Arroyo Grande Creek, has playgrounds, picnic areas and sports facilities. Lopez Lake, about 10 miles (16 km) east of the city, is a county recreation area offering camping, boating, fishing and trails.

== Government ==
Arroyo Grande is a general-law city with a council–manager government. The council consists of a mayor elected at large for a two-year term and four councilmembers elected by district for staggered four-year terms. Elections are nonpartisan. The city adopted district elections in April 2022. Districts 1 and 4 first elected representatives in November 2022, followed by districts 2 and 3 in November 2024.

As of September 2026, the mayor is Caren Ray Russom and the councilmembers are Kate Secrest, Aileen Loe, Jamie Maraviglia and Jim Guthrie. Matthew Downing is the city manager.

In the California State Legislature, Arroyo Grande is in the 17th senatorial district, represented by Democrat John Laird and the 30th Assembly district, represented by Democrat Dawn Addis. In the United States House of Representatives, it is in California's 24th congressional district, represented by Democrat Salud Carbajal.

== Education ==
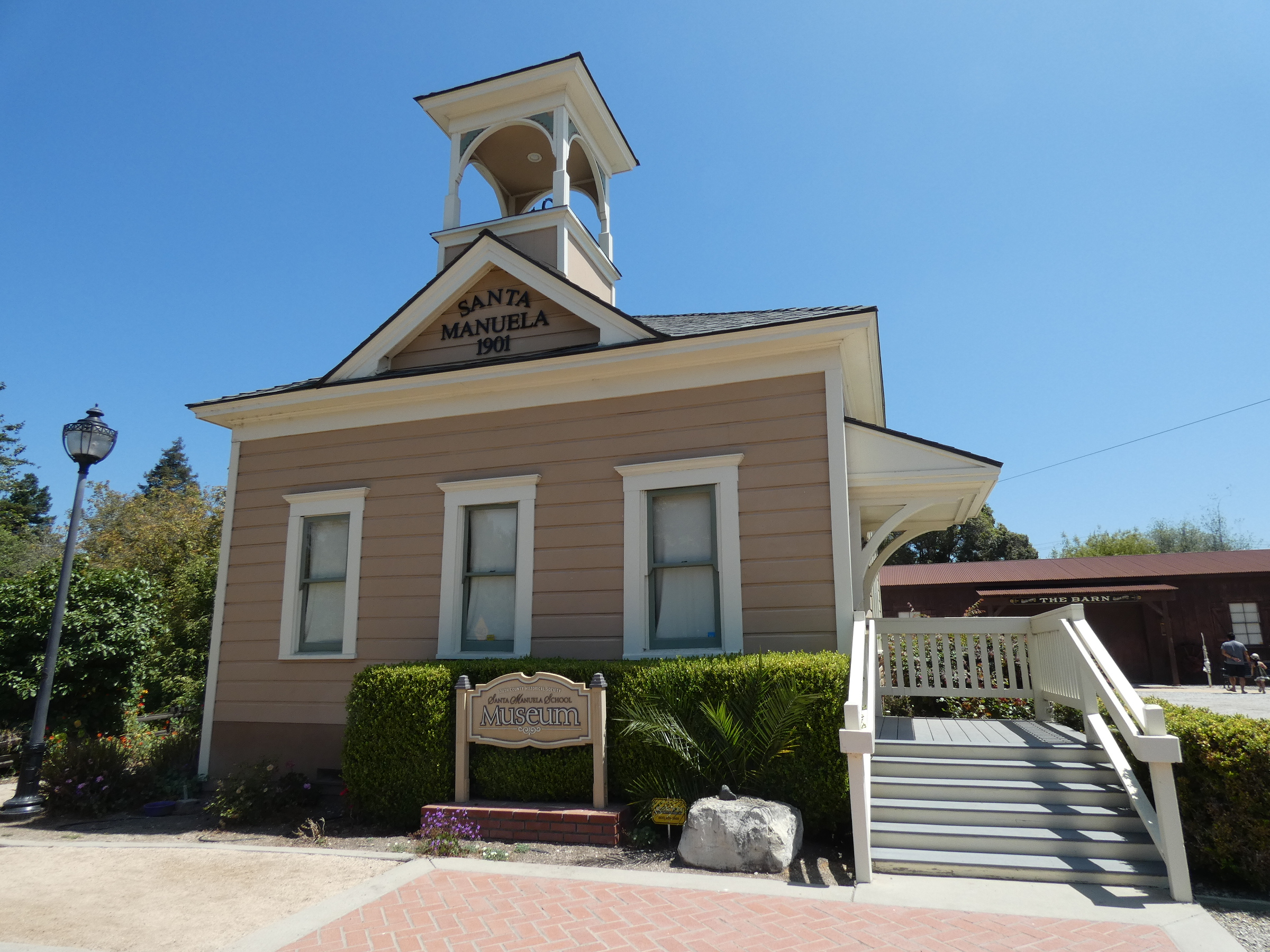
The historic Santa Manuela Schoolhouse is now a museum.

Public schools are operated by the Lucia Mar Unified School District. Schools within Arroyo Grande include Harloe and Ocean View elementary schools, Paulding Middle School and Arroyo Grande High School.

== Infrastructure ==
=== Transportation ===
U.S. Route 101 passes through Arroyo Grande, and State Route 227 connects the city with San Luis Obispo. Passenger rail service is available at nearby Grover Beach station. The San Luis Obispo Regional Transit Authority operates South County bus services, including Route 27 between Arroyo Grande, Grover Beach and Oceano.

=== Utilities and public services ===
The city operates its water distribution and sewer collection systems. Lopez Lake has historically supplied about 60–65 percent of its drinking water, supplemented by wells in the Santa Maria Groundwater Basin and Pismo Formation. The South San Luis Obispo County Sanitation District treats wastewater from Arroyo Grande, Grover Beach and Oceano.

Arroyo Grande Community Hospital opened in 1962 and has 65 licensed beds. The Five Cities Fire Authority provides fire protection; Arroyo Grande and Grover Beach are its member cities.

== Notable people ==
- Zac Efron, actor who grew up in Arroyo Grande
- Lou Ferrigno, actor and bodybuilder who bought a home in the Arroyo Grande area
- Horace Grant, professional basketball player and Arroyo Grande resident
- Jordan Hasay, distance runner from Arroyo Grande
- Robert Hunter, lyricist and singer-songwriter born in Arroyo Grande
- Ken Napzok, author and Arroyo Grande native
- Rita Quigley, actress who died in Arroyo Grande
- Harry Shum Jr., actor and dancer who grew up in Arroyo Grande
- Sheila Varian, Arabian horse breeder whose home and ranch were in the Arroyo Grande area
- Robin Ventura, baseball player who coached at Arroyo Grande High School
- Jimy Williams, baseball player and manager who grew up in Arroyo Grande

== See also ==
- Cypress Ridge Golf Course
