= Lopez Lake =

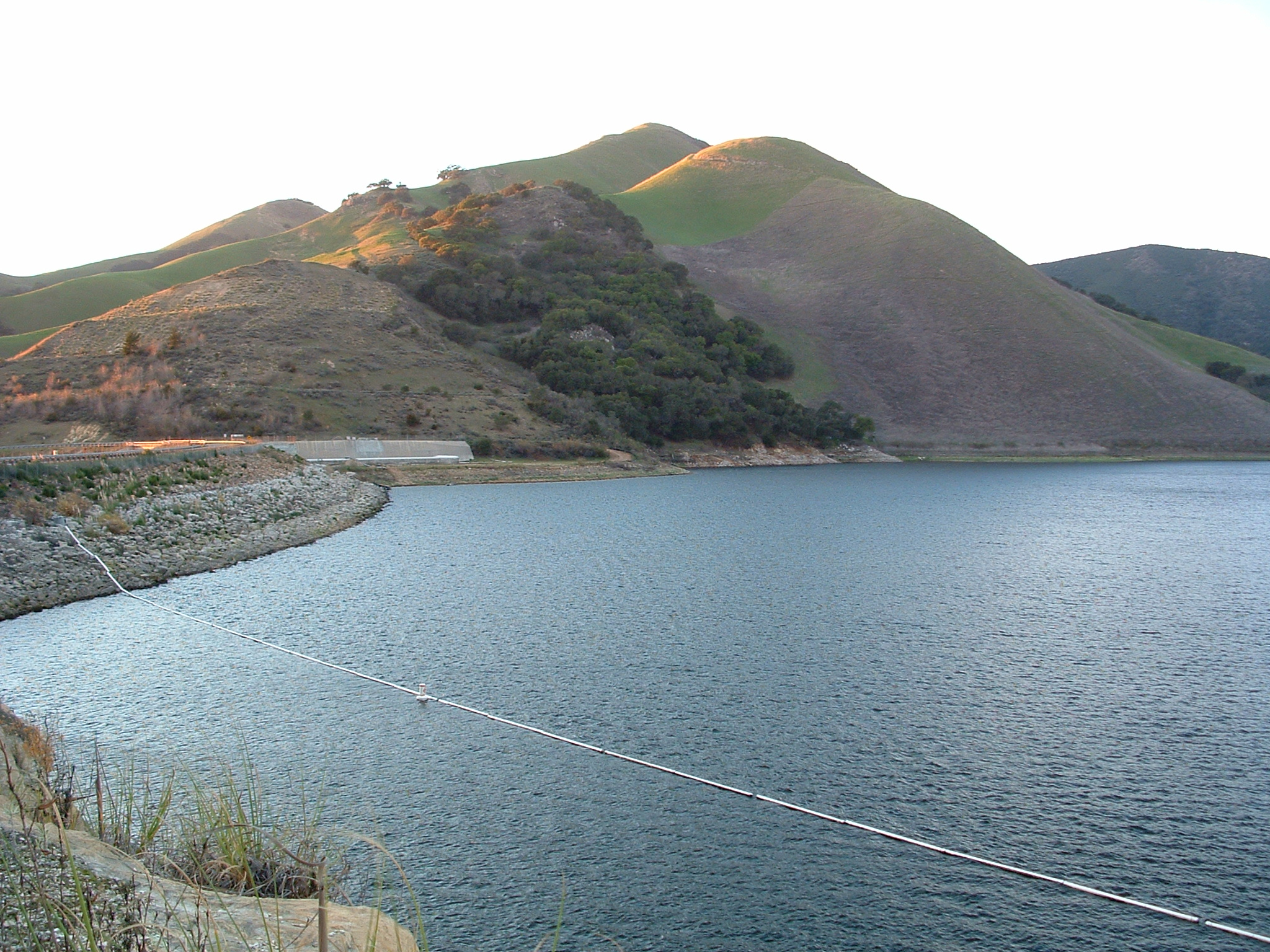
- Lopez Lake, with the dam on the left

- Location within California Location within the United States
- Location: San Luis Obispo County, California
- Coordinates: 35.19261°N 120.47316°W
- Type: Reservoir
- Primary inflows: Arroyo Grande Creek; Huff's Hole Creek; Phoenix Creek
- Primary outflows: Arroyo Grande Creek
- Basin countries: United States
- Water volume: 60,700,000 m^{3} (49,200 acre⋅ft)
- Surface elevation: 170 m (560 ft)
- References: U.S. Geological Survey Geographic Names Information System: Lopez Lake

Lopez Lake is a reservoir near the city of Arroyo Grande in San Luis Obispo County, California. The lake is formed by Lopez Dam on Arroyo Grande Creek, 9 mi (14 km) upstream from the Pacific Ocean. The creek drains about 60 sq mi (160 km^{2}) above the dam and 90 sq mi (230 km^{2}) below. The dam was built in 1969 (57 years ago) and is operated by the San Luis Obispo County Flood Control and Water Conservation District. The earth-fill dam was retrofitted to protect against earthquakes between 2001 and 2003. The winter of 2022-2023 brought the reservoir to the capacity of 49,200 acre-feet (60,700,000 m^{3}). In March 2023 the lake overflowed into the spillway for the first time since 1998, some 25 years prior.

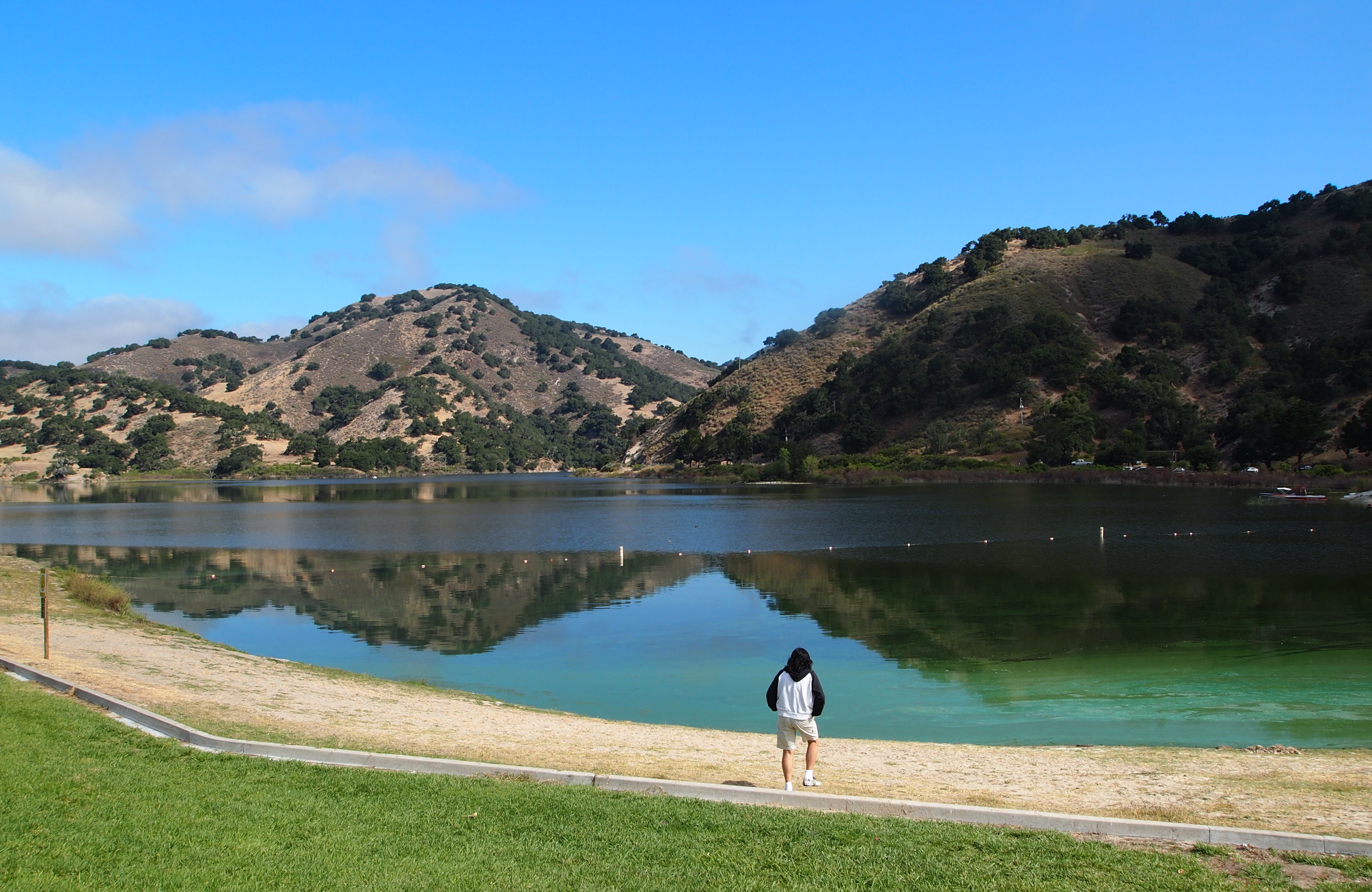
Lopez Lake beach

Lopez Lake provides drinking water for Arroyo Grande, Grover Beach, Pismo Beach, Oceano and Avila Beach. It also provides groundwater recharge, water for irrigation and flood control. Unlike most municipal water supplies, human contact with the water is permitted. Sailing, wind surfing, water skiing, swimming, fishing and camping are popular activities. There is also a waterslide next to the lake. To prevent contamination of the drinking water, water from the lake is piped 3 mi (4.8 km) to a terminal reservoir, where it remains to allow particles to settle out and pathogens to die off. The water then goes through flocculation, filtration and chlorination at the Lopez Water Treatment Plant.

The recreation area consists of 4,200 acres (1,700 ha) of open space, trails and camping areas. A network of equestrian, bike and hiking trails criss-cross the park which is primarily oak woodland and coastal sage scrub. The area is frequented by black bears, mountain lions, mule deer and a number of other small mammals.

Several special events are held at the park yearly such as the Lopez Lake Trout Derby held in May, the California Polytechnic University Triathlon and the Scott Tinley Dirty Adventures Triathlon.

== See also ==
- List of dams and reservoirs in California
- List of lakes in California
