= Spade bit (horse) =

Historic vaquero design for a type of curb bit

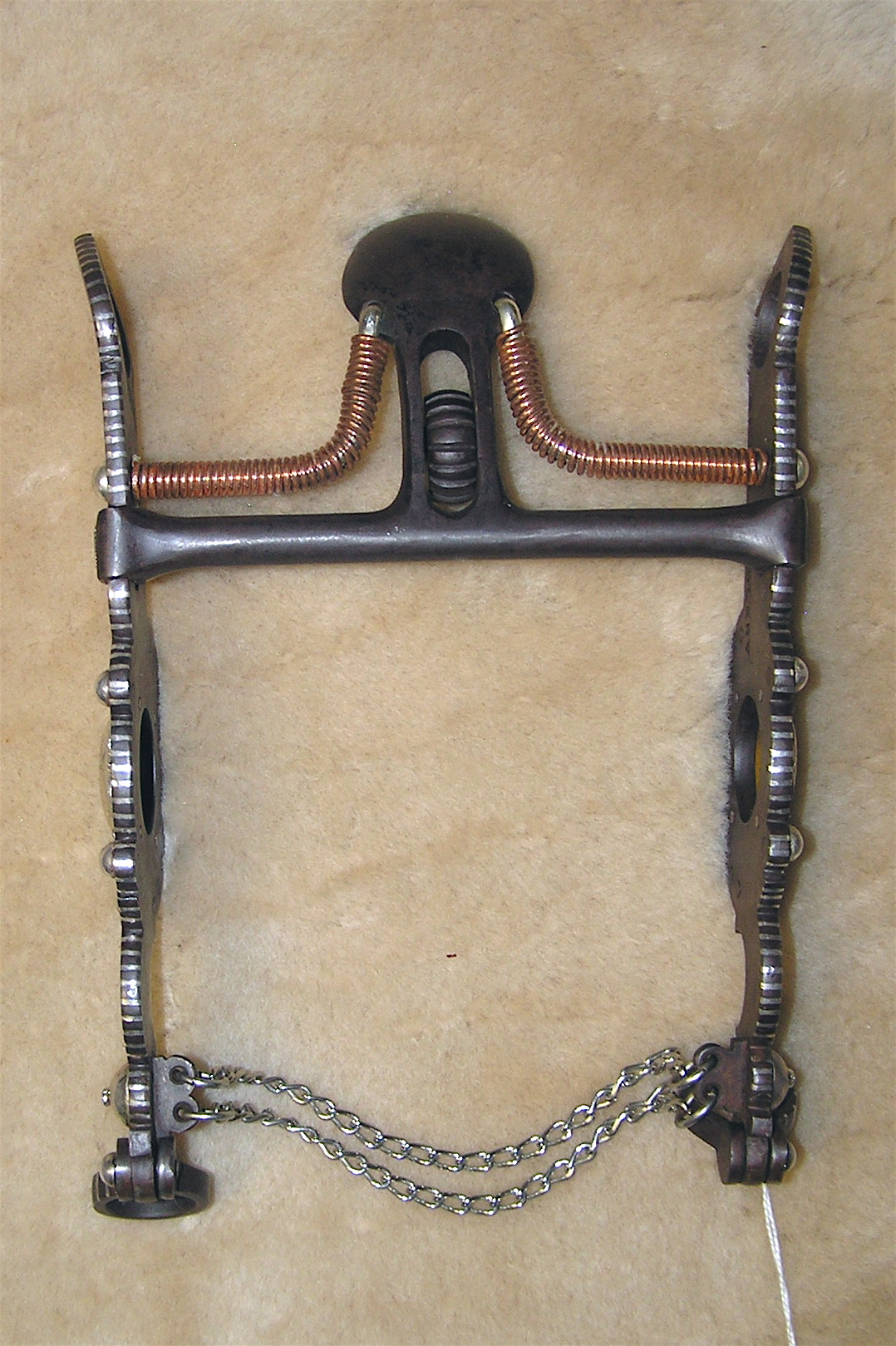
A spade bit

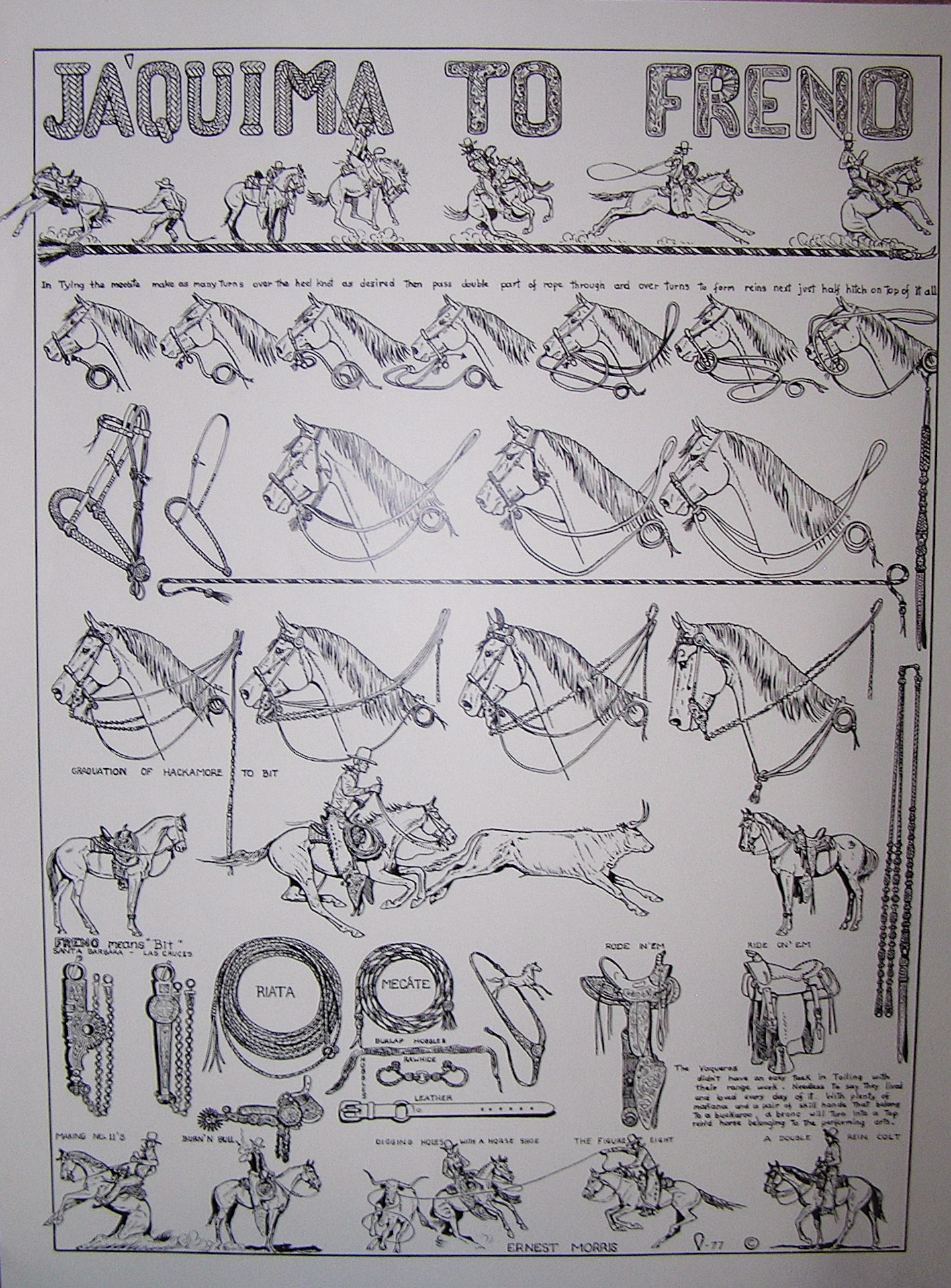
A poster illustrating the process of training a spade bit horse

The spade bit is a historic vaquero design for a type of curb bit with straight, highly decorated shanks and a mouthpiece that includes a straight bar, a narrow port with a cricket, and a "spoon," a flat, partly rounded plate affixed above the port, supported by braces on either side. Considered a highly technical piece of equipment to be used only on a finished horse, the spade bit is a refined tool that experts compare to driving a sports car in its ability to convey precise commands to the horse. Not all horses have the conformation or temperament to become a finished spade bit horse, a process that takes a number of years and is seldom complete until a horse has at least five years of training under saddle.

== Use ==
The spade bit is an elaborate, complex bit that can only be properly used on a highly trained horse handled by a skilled rider. In the vaquero tradition, its use represents the highest level of trust and communication between horse and rider. Experts compare the ride and handling of a horse trained in this manner to that of a Jaguar. The process of training the spade bit horse takes five to seven years to complete. Its emphasis has always been on producing a finely tuned working horse and partner, emphasizing quality rather than on how quickly the goal is reached. The conformation of the horse is also a factor; to become a spade bit horse, the animal must be bred to have a higher neck set and well-carried head.

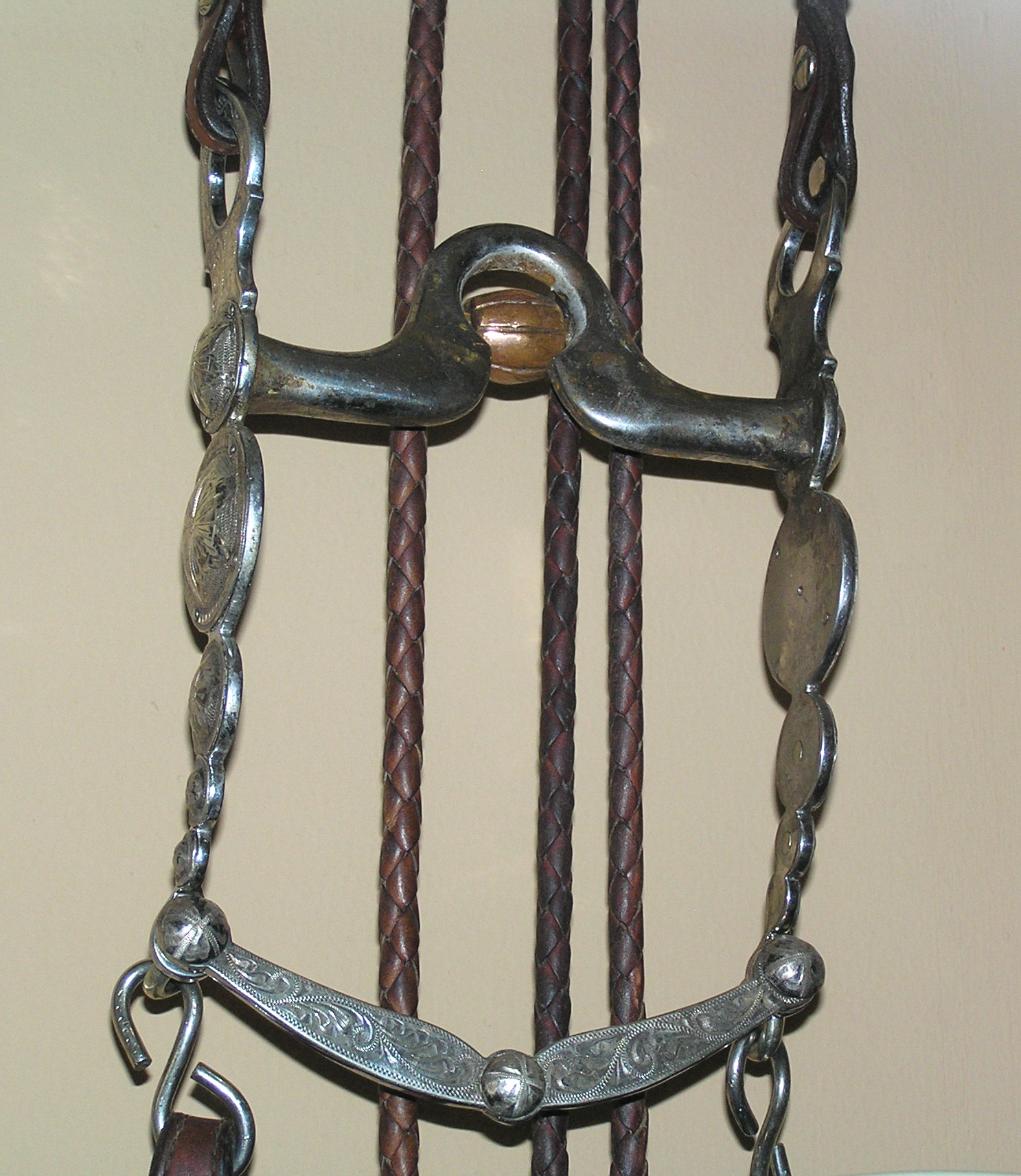
One style of intermediate curb, a "frog mouth" with cricket roller, that may be used in a two-rein

Traditionally, the vaquero method starts a young horse using a hackamore, which is headgear with no bit that uses a heavy rawhide noseband, called a bosal, to control the horse. Then the horse moves to lighter bosals, and next into a combination of headgear that represents a transitional period in its training; a bridle with a type of curb bit called a "half breed" which is worn in conjunction with a light bosal. The rider carries two sets of reins, one set on the bosal and one on the curb, giving this gear its name, the "two-rein. After several years in a two-rein, the horse graduates into the spade bit. A light bosal called a bosalito remains on the horse by tradition, usually without reins attached.

== Sources ==
- Clayton, Lawrence; Hoy, James F; Underwood, Jerald (2001). Vaqueros, cowboys, and buckaroos: The Genesis and Life of the Mounted North American Herders. Austin, TX: University of Texas Press. ISBN 978-0-292-71240-9.
- "Buckaroos: Views of a Western Way of Life". Buckaroos in Paradise: Ranching Culture in Northern Nevada, 1945–1982. Library of Congress. 1980.
- Varian, Sheila (November 2004). The Vaquero Tradition: Hackamore, 2 Rein and Spade Bit (DVD). California: Santa Ynez Historical Society.
- Bennett, Deb (1998) Conquerors: The Roots of New World Horsemanship. Amigo Publications Inc; 1st edition. ISBN 0-9658533-0-6
- Connell, Ed (1952) Hackamore Reinsman. The Longhorn Press, Cisco, Texas. Fifth Printing, August, 1958.
- Jaheil, Jessica. "Bosal, snaffle, spade - why?" Horse Sense, web page accessed July 11, 2011
