= List of ranchos of California =

Pre-statehood land grants

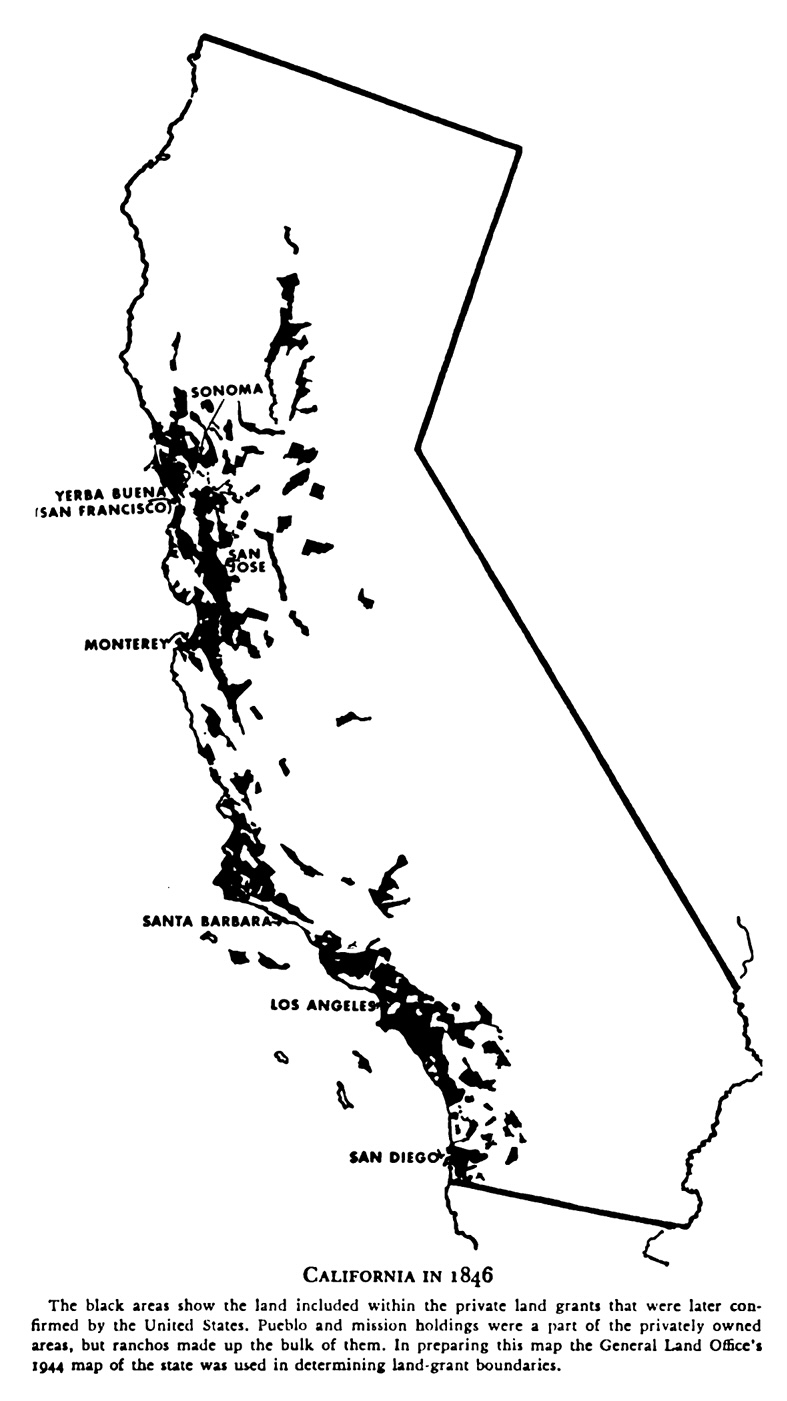
"California in 1846" map shows geographic distribution of Spanish and Mexican land grants

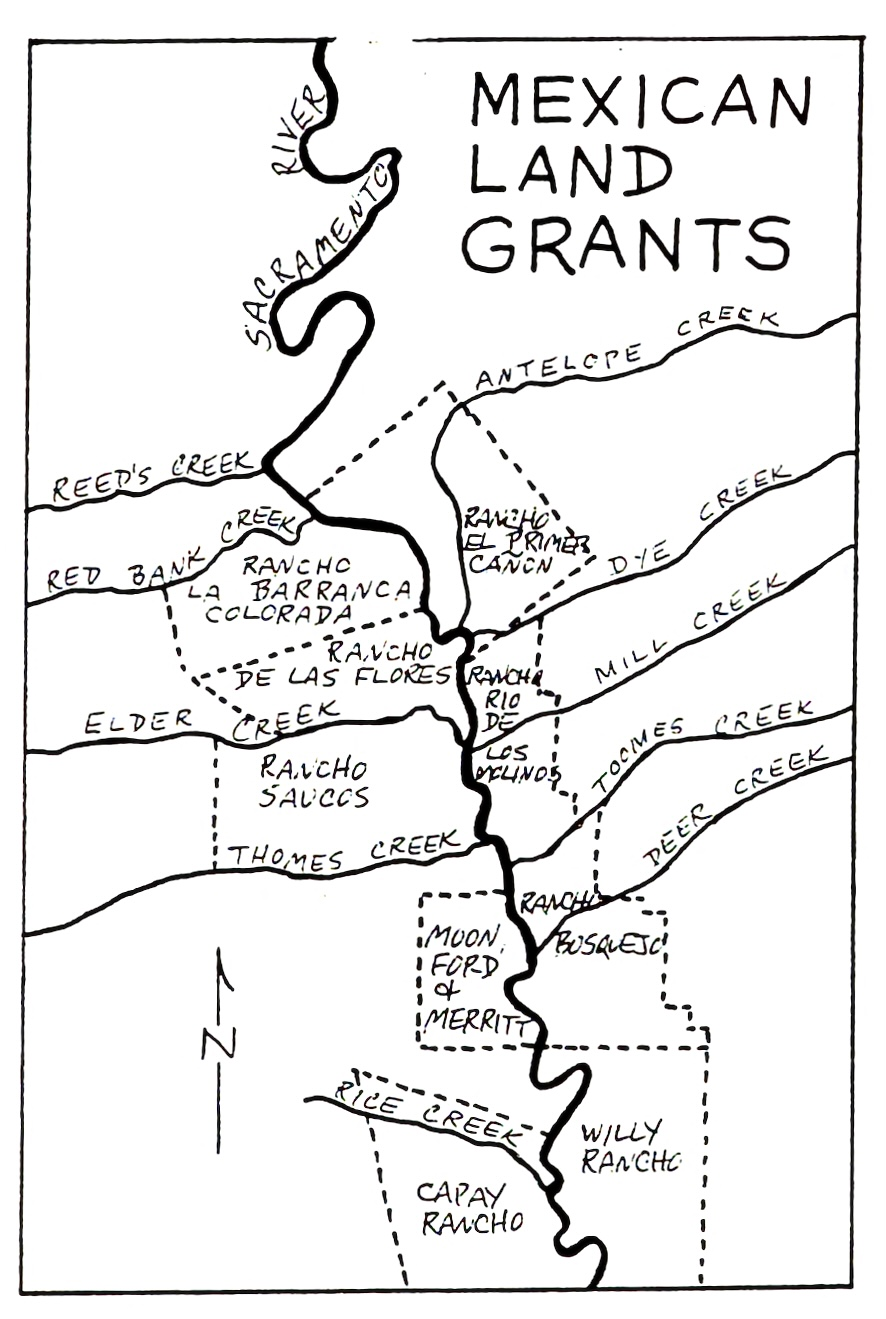
Mexican land grants of Tehama County, California (Bureau of Land Management map, 1997)

These California land grants were made by Spanish (1784–1821) and Mexican (1822–1846) authorities of Las Californias and Alta California to private individuals before California became part of the United States of America. Under Spain, no private land ownership was allowed, so the grants were more akin to free leases. After Mexico achieved independence, the Spanish grants became actual land ownership grants. Following the Mexican–American War, the 1848 Treaty of Guadalupe Hidalgo provided that the land grants would be honored.

== Alta California ranchos in Mexico ==
From 1773 to 1836, the border between Alta California and Baja California was about 30 miles south of the Mexico–United States border drawn by the Treaty of Guadalupe Hidalgo that ended the Mexican–American War in 1848.

Under the Siete Leyes constitutional reforms of 1836, the Alta California and Baja California territories were recombined into a single Las Californias "department", with a single governor. None of the rancho grants near the former border, however, were made after 1836, so none of them straddled the pre-1836 territorial border.

The result of the shifting borders is that some of the ranchos in this list, created by pre-1836 governors, are located partially or entirely in a 30-mile-wide sliver of the former Alta California that is now in Mexico rather than in the U.S. state of California. Since those ranchos remained in Mexico, in today's Mexican state of Baja California, the grants were not subject to review by the Public Land Commission except for Rancho Tijuan that had claimed part of its lands were on the American side of the border.

== List of ranchos of California ==
| Grant (Note: Grant name.) | Date (Note: Date of original grant. (default sort)) | Grantor (Note: Original grantor.) | Grantee (Note: Original grantee.) | Size (Note: Patented area.) | Land Case No. (Note: US District Court (Southern District SD or Northern District ND) case number.) | Location (Note: Representative present day cities.) | County (Note: Present day county, in California or Municipality in Baja California.) |
|---|---|---|---|---|---|---|---|
| San Pedro | 1784 | Pedro Fages | Juan Jose Dominguez | 48,000 acres (19,425 ha) | 273 SD | San Pedro | Los Angeles |
| Los Nietos | 1784 | Pedro Fages | Manuel Nieto | 167,000 acres (67,583 ha) | (Note: Partitioned in 1833.) | Long Beach, Downey, Whittier | Los Angeles |
| San Rafael | 1784 | Pedro Fages | José María Verdugo | 36,403 acres (14,732 ha) | 381 SD | Glendale | Los Angeles |
| Nuestra Señora del Refugio | 1794 | Diego de Borica | José Francisco Ortega | 26,529 acres (10,736 ha) | 154 SD | Refugio State Beach | Santa Barbara |
| Los Feliz | 1795 | Diego de Borica | Jose Vicente Feliz | 6,647 acres (2,690 ha) | 133 SD | Los Feliz | Los Angeles |
| Simi | 1795 | Diego de Borica | Patricio, Miguel, and Francisco Javier Pico | 113,057 acres (45,753 ha) | 103 SD | Simi Valley, Moorpark | Ventura |
| Buena Vista | 1795 | Diego de Borica | Jose Maria Soberanes and Joaquin Castro | 8,446 acres (3,418 ha) | 204 SD | Monterey | Monterey |
| Las Pulgas | 1795 | Diego de Borica | José Dario Argüello and Luis Antonio Argüello | 35,240 acres (14,261 ha) | 54 ND | San Mateo, Belmont, San Carlos, Menlo Park | San Mateo |
| Las Salinas | 1795 | Diego de Borica | Antonio Aceves and Antonio Romero | 17,712 acres (7,168 ha) | 158 SD | Marina, Salinas | Monterey |
| Las Virgenes | 1802 | José Joaquín de Arrillaga | Miguel Ortega | 17,760 acres (7,187 ha) | 265 SD | Agoura Hills | Los Angeles |
| El Conejo | 1803; 1822 | José Joaquín de Arrillaga; Pablo Vicente de Solá | Ygnacio Rodríguez and José Polanco; José de la Guerra y Noriega | 48,672 acres (19,697 ha) | 107 SD | Newbury Park, Thousand Oaks, Lake Sherwood, Westlake Village, Oak Park | Ventura |
| Las Animas | 1803 | Feliz Berenguer | José Mariano Castro | 24,066 acres (9,739 ha) | 136 ND | Gilroy | Santa Clara |
| Topanga Malibu Sequit | 1804 | José Joaquín de Arrillaga | José Bartolomé Tapia | 13,300 acres (5,382 ha) | 147 SD | Malibu | Los Angeles |
| Los Palos Verdes | 1809 | | José Dolores Sepúlveda | 31,629 acres (12,800 ha) | 273 SD | Palos Verdes | Los Angeles |
| San Ysidro | 1809 | José Joaquín de Arrillaga | Ygnacio Ortega | 13,066 acres (5,288 ha) | (Note: Partitioned in 1833.) | Gilroy | Santa Clara |
| San Antonio | 1810 | | Antonio María Lugo | 29,513 acres (11,943 ha) | 9 SD | Bell, South Gate | Los Angeles |
| Santiago de Santa Ana | 1810 | José Joaquín de Arrillaga | José Antonio Yorba and Juan Pablo Peralta | 63,414 acres (25,663 ha) | 346 SD | Santa Ana, Irvine | Orange |
| Temescal | 1819 (Note: 1819 is the date Serrano was given permission to occupy the land. No land grant was ever issued. The United States Supreme Court rejected the claim in 1866.) | NA | Leandro Serrano and wife, Josefa Montalva de Serrano | NA | 374 SD | Corona, Temescal Valley | Riverside |
| San Antonio | 1820 | Pablo Vicente de Solá | Luís María Peralta | 44,800 acres (18,130 ha) | 98 ND, 99 ND, 100 ND | Alameda, Berkeley, Oakland, San Leandro | Alameda |
| Rincon de los Bueyes | 1821 | Pablo Vicente de Solá | Bernardo Higuera and Cornelio Lopez | 3,127 acres (1,265 ha) | 131 SD | Culver City, Baldwin Hills | Los Angeles |
| Vega del Rio del Pajaro | 1821 | Pablo Vicente de Solá | Antonio Maria Castro | 4,310 acres (1,744 ha) | 245 SD | Monterey, Watsonville | Monterey |
| Los Tularcitos | 1821 | Pablo Vicente de Solá | José Loreto Higuera | 4,394 acres (1,778 ha) | 228 ND | Milpitas | Santa Clara |
| San Pablo | 1823 | Luís Antonio Argüello | Francisco María Castro | 17,939 acres (7,260 ha) | 277 ND, 320 ND | Richmond, San Pablo | Contra Costa |
| Las Cienegas | 1823 | Luis Antonio Argüello | Francisco Avila | 4,439 acres (1,796 ha) | 353 SD | Los Angeles | Los Angeles |
| Llano de Buena Vista | 1823 | Luís Antonio Argüello | José Mariano Estrada | 8,446 acres (3,418 ha) | 151 SD | Spreckels | Monterey |
| Santa Maria de Los Peñasquitos | 1823 | Luís Antonio Argüello | Francisco María Ruiz | 8,486 acres (3,434 ha) | 142 SD | Peñasquitos | San Diego |
| Bolsa de San Cayetano | 1824 | Luís Antonio Argüello | Ygnacio Vallejo | 8,881 acres (3,594 ha) | 35 SD, 278 SD | Watsonville | Monterey |
| Bolsa Nueva y Moro Cojo | 1825 | Luís Antonio Argüello | María Antonia Pico de Castro | 30,901 acres (12,505 ha) | 7 SD | Castroville | Monterey |
| El Rosario | 1827 | José María de Echeandía | José Manuel Machado | 47,702.53 acres (19,305 ha) (Note: Granted on February 14, 1827, located in Alta California, south of the borders established in the Treaty of Guadalupe Hidalgo, that then became part of Baja California. It was south of the Rancho Tía Juana on the lands near the Misión El Descanso.) | Not before Land Commission. | El Descanso, Playas de Rosarito | Municipio de Playas de Rosarito, Baja California, Mexico |
| La Brea | 1828 | José Antonio Carrillo | Antonio Jose Rocha and Nemisio Dominguez | 4,439 acres (1,796 ha) | 287 SD | Hollywood, West Hollywood | Los Angeles |
| San Antonio Abad | 1828 ? | unknown | unknown | | Not before Land Commission | Tijuana | Municipio de Tijuana, Baja California, Mexico |
| Janal | 1829 | José María de Echeandía | José Antonio Estudillo | 4,437 acres (1,796 ha) | 226 SD | Chula Vista | San Diego |
| Otay | 1829 | José María de Echeandía | Magdelena Estudillo | 6,658 acres (2,694 ha) | 66 SD | Chula Vista | San Diego |
| Tía Juana | 1829 | José María de Echeandía | Santiago Argüello Moraga | 26,019.53 acres (10,530 ha) (Note: Granted, March 24, 1829, located primarily in the part of Alta California, south of the borders established in the Treaty of Guadalupe Hidalgo, that then became part of Baja California. The segment of its lands in the United States were never presented in a case before the land commission or in U. S. courts.) | Not before Land Commission. | Tijuana; San Ysidro, San Diego, Tijuana River Valley, San Diego | Municipio de Tijuana, Baja California, Mexico; San Diego |
| Tecate | 1829, 1834 | José María de Echeandía | Juan Bandini | 4,439 acres (1,796 ha) | Not before Land Commission (Note: Granted in late 1829 or early 1830, located in the part of Alta California, south of the borders established in the Treaty of Guadalupe Hidalgo, that then became part of Baja California. Formal grant to the rancho was recorded in July 12, 1834. It was abandoned in 1837 after Kumeyaay raiders plundered it and burned the ranch house. Its title was never presented in a case before the land commission or in U. S. courts.) | Tecate | Tecate Municipality, Baja California, Mexico |
| Rosa Castilla | 1831 | Manuel Victoria | Juan Ballesteros | 3,283 acres (1,329 ha) | 309 SD | El Sereno, University Hills | Los Angeles |
| Jamul | 1831 | Manuel Victoria | Pío Pico | 8,926 acres (3,612 ha) | 367 SD | Jamul | San Diego |
| Solis | 1831 | Jose Figueroa | Mariano Castro | 8,875 acres (3,592 ha) | 405 ND | Gilroy | Santa Clara |
| San Ramon | 1833 | José Figueroa | Bartolome Pacheco and Mariano Castro | 8,917 acres (3,609 ha) | 73 ND, 322 ND | Alamo, Danville | Contra Costa |
| Saucito | 1833 | José Figueroa | Graciano Manjares | 2,212 acres (895 ha) | 99 SD | Del Rey Oaks | Monterey |
| Punta de Pinos | 1833 | José Figueroa | José María Armenta and José Abrego | 2,667 acres (1,079 ha) | 169 SD, 380 SD | Pacific Grove, Point Pinos | Monterey |
| Guadalupe y Llanitos de los Correos | 1833 | José Figueroa | Juan Malarin | 8,858 acres (3,585 ha) | 109 SD | Chualar | Monterey |
| Cañada del Corte de Madera | 1833 | José Figueroa | Maximo Martinez and José Domingo Peralta | 3,566 acres (1,443 ha) | 395 ND | | San Mateo |
| Pescadero | 1833 | José Figueroa | Juan Gonzalez | 3,282 acres (1,328 ha) | 104 ND | Pescadero | San Mateo |
| San Ysidro (Ortega) | 1833 | José Figueroa | José Quintin Ortega | 4,439 acres (1,796 ha) | 163 ND | Gilroy | Santa Clara |
| San Ysidro (Gilroy) | 1833 | José Figueroa | Maria Clara de la Asuncion Ortega | 4,461 acres (1,805 ha) | 216 ND | Gilroy | Santa Clara |
| La Polka | 1833 | José Figueroa | Ysabel Ortega | 4,167 acres (1,686 ha) | 159 ND | Gilroy | Santa Clara |
| Ausaymas y San Felipe | 1833 | José Figueroa | Francisco Pérez Pacheco | 35,504 acres (14,368 ha) | 79 SD | | Santa Clara |
| Yerba Buena | 1833 | José Figueroa | Antonio Chaboya | 24,332 acres (9,847 ha) | 213 ND | Evergreen | Santa Clara |
| San Andrés | 1833 | José Figueroa | José Joaquín Castro | 8,911 acres (3,606 ha) | 100 SD | La Selva Beach | Santa Cruz |
| Aptos | 1833 | José Figueroa | Rafael Castro | 6,686 acres (2,706 ha) | 172 SD | Seacliff | Santa Cruz |
| San Agustin | 1833 | José Figueroa | José Antonio Bolcoff | 4,437 acres (1,796 ha) | 180 ND | Scotts Valley | Santa Cruz |
| Soquel | 1833 | José Figueroa | Martina Castro | 34,370 acres (13,909 ha) | 295 ND | Soquel | Santa Cruz |
| Zayante | 1833 | José Figueroa | Joaquin Buelna | 2,658 acres (1,076 ha) | 309 ND, 342 ND | Zayante | Santa Cruz |
| El Molino | 1833 | José Figueroa | John B.R. Cooper | 17,892 acres (7,241 ha) | 227 ND | Forestville | Sonoma |
| Sespe | 1833 | José Figueroa | Carlos Antonio Carrillo | 8,881 acres (3,594 ha) | 32 SD | Fillmore, Bardsdale, Piru | Ventura |
| Melijo | 1833 | José Figueroa | Santiago E. Argüello | 4,439 acres (1,796 ha) | 91 SD | Chula Vista, Imperial Beach, San Diego | San Diego |
| Acalanes | 1834 | José Figueroa | Candelario Valencia | 3,329 acres (1,347 ha) | 31 ND | Lafayette, Moraga | Contra Costa |
| Arroyo de Las Nueces y Bolbones | 1834 | José Figueroa | Juana Sanchez de Pacheco | 17,782 acres (7,196 ha) | 46 ND | Walnut Creek | Contra Costa |
| Monte del Diablo | 1834 | José Figueroa | Salvio Pacheco | 17,922 acres (7,253 ha) | 20 ND | Concord | Contra Costa |
| San Ramon | 1834 | José Figueroa | Jose Maria Amador | 20,968 acres (8,485 ha) | 144 ND, 287 ND | Danville | Contra Costa |
| San Pascual | 1834 | José Figueroa | Juan Marine | 14,403 acres (5,829 ha) | 116 SD, 173 SD | Pasadena | Los Angeles |
| Corte Madera del Presidio | 1834 | José Figueroa | John (Juan) Reed | 7,845 acres (3,175 ha) | 183 ND | Corte Madera | Marin |
| El Alisal | 1834 | José Figueroa | Feliciano Soberanes | 5,941 acres (2,404 ha) | 254 SD | Salinas | Monterey |
| Los Carneros | 1834 | José Figueroa | David Littlejohn | 6,111 acres (2,473 ha) | 322 SD | Elkhorn | Monterey |
| Encinal y Buena Esperanza | 1834 | José Figueroa | David S. Spence | 13,392 acres (5,420 ha) | 4 SD | Spence | Monterey |
| Laguna Seca | 1834 | José Figueroa | Catalina M. Munras | 2,179 acres (882 ha) | 16 SD | | Monterey |
| Sausal | 1834 | José Figueroa | Jose Tiburcio Castro | 10,242 acres (4,145 ha) | 190 SD | Salinas | Monterey |
| El Sur | 1834 | José Figueroa | Juan Alvarado | 8,949 acres (3,622 ha) | 1 SD | Andrew Molera State Park; El Sur Ranch | Monterey |
| Tularcitos | 1834 | José Figueroa | Rafael Gomez | 26,581 acres (10,757 ha) | 3 SD | | Monterey |
| Los Alamitos | 1834 | José Figueroa | Juan Jose Nieto | 28,027 acres (11,342 ha) | 140 SD | Los Alamitos, Seal Beach | Orange |
| Las Bolsas | 1834 | José Figueroa | Catarina Ruiz | 33,460 acres (13,541 ha) | 208 SD | Huntington Beach, Westminster, Garden Grove, Fountain Valley. | Orange |
| Cañón de Santa Ana | 1834 | José Figueroa | Bernardo Yorba | 13,328 acres (5,394 ha) | 89 SD | Yorba Linda | Orange |
| Los Cerritos | 1834 | José Figueroa | Manuela Nieto de Cota | 27,054 acres (10,948 ha) | 17 SD | Cerritos, Long Beach | Orange |
| Los Coyotes | 1834 | José Figueroa | Juan Jose Nieto | 48,806 acres (19,751 ha) | 372 SD | Cerritos, Stanton, Buena Park | Orange |
| Santa Gertrudes | 1834 | José Figueroa | Josefa Cota | 21,298 acres (8,619 ha) | 193 SD, 194 SD, 272 SD | Downey, Santa Fe Springs | Los Angeles |
| Laguna Seca | 1834 | José Figueroa | Juan Alvires | 20,051 acres (8,114 ha) | 211 ND, 294 ND | Coyote | Santa Clara |
| San Francisco de las Llagas | 1834 | José Figueroa | Carlos Castro | 22,980 acres (9,300 ha) | 147 ND | San Martin | Santa Clara |
| Santa Teresa | 1834 | José Figueroa | Jose Joaquin Bernal | 9,647 acres (3,904 ha) | 181 ND | San Jose | Santa Clara |
| Arroyo del Rodeo | 1834 | José Figueroa | Francisco Rodriguez | 1,473 acres (596 ha) | 307 SD | Live Oak | Santa Cruz |
| Salsipuedes | 1834 | José Figueroa | Manuel Jimeno Casarin | 31,201 acres (12,627 ha) | 201 SD | Watsonville | Santa Cruz |
| Petaluma | 1834 | José Figueroa | Mariano Guadalupe Vallejo | 66,622 acres (26,961 ha) | 256 ND | Petaluma | Sonoma |
| Las Posas | 1834 | José Figueroa | Jose Carillo | 26,623 acres (10,774 ha) | 117 SD | Camarillo, Somis | Ventura |
| Paso de Bartolo | 1835 | José Figueroa | Juan Crispin Pere | 8,894 acres (3,599 ha) | 87 SD | Whittier, Pico Rivera | Los Angeles |
| Aguajito | 1835 | José Figueroa | Gregorio Tapia | 3,323 acres (1,345 ha) | 323 SD | Monterey | Monterey |
| Ojo del Agua de la Coche | 1835 | José Figueroa | Juan M. Hernandez | 8,927 acres (3,613 ha) | 379 ND | Morgan Hill | Santa Clara |
| El Rincon | 1835 | José Figueroa | Teodoro Arellanes | 4,460 acres (1,805 ha) | 59 SD | La Conchita | Ventura |
| Los Méganos | 1835 | José Castro | Jose Noriega | 13,316 acres (5,389 ha) | 107 ND | Brentwood | Contra Costa |
| Cañada de la Carpenteria | 1835 | José Castro | Joaquín Soto | 2,236 acres (905 ha) | 198 SD | | Monterey |
| Chamisal | 1835 | José Castro | Felipe Vasquez | 2,737 acres (1,108 ha) | 222 SD | | Monterey |
| Noche Buena | 1835 | José Castro | Juan Antonio Muñoz | 4,412 acres (1,785 ha) | 237 SD | Seaside | Monterey |
| San Francisquito | 1835 | José Castro | Catalina Manzaneli de Munras | 8,813 acres (3,566 ha) | 247 SD | | Monterey |
| San Vicente | 1835 | José Castro | Esteban Munras | 19,979 acres (8,085 ha) | 95 SD | Soledad | Monterey |
| El Toro | 1835 | José Castro | José Ramón Estrada | 5,668 acres (2,294 ha) | 112 SD | | Monterey |
| Los Vergeles | 1835 | José Castro | José Joaquin Gomez | 8,760 acres (3,545 ha) | 111 SD | | Monterey |
| Llano de Tesquisquita | 1835 | José Castro | Jose Maria Sanchez | 16,016 acres (6,481 ha) | 106 SD | | San Benito |
| Las Aromitas y Agua Caliente | 1835 | José Castro | Juan Miguel Anzar | 8,660 acres (3,505 ha) | 102 SD | Aromas | San Benito |
| Buri Buri | 1835 | José Castro | José Antonio Sánchez | 14,639 acres (5,924 ha) | 101 ND | San Bruno | San Mateo |
| Laguna de la Merced | 1835 | José Castro | Jose Antonio Galindo | 2,219 acres (898 ha) | 380 ND | Daly City | San Mateo |
| Juristac | 1835 | José Castro | Antonio and Faustino German | 4,540 acres (1,837 ha) | 9 ND, 396 SD | Sargent | Santa Clara |
| Milpitas | 1835 | José Castro | José María Alviso | 4,458 acres (1,804 ha) | 37 ND, 388 ND | Milpitas | Santa Clara |
| Pala | 1835 | José Castro | Jose Higuera | 4,454 acres (1,802 ha) | 215 ND | San Jose | Santa Clara |
| Punta de los Reyes | 1836 | Nicolas Gutierrez | James Richard Berry | 13,645 acres (5,522 ha) | 418 ND | | Marin |
| Punta de los Reyes | 1836 | Nicolas Gutierrez | James Richard Berry | 8,878 acres (3,593 ha) | 385 ND | Inverness | Marin |
| Tomales y Baulines | 1836 | Nicolas Gutierrez | Rafael Garcia | 8,863 acres (3,587 ha) | 418 ND | | Marin |
| Corral de Tierra | 1836 | Nicolas Gutierrez | Guadalupe Figueroa | 4,435 acres (1,795 ha) | 359 SD | | Monterey |
| Pescadero | 1836 | Nicolas Gutierrez | Fabian Barreto | 4,426 acres (1,791 ha) | 157 SD | Pebble Beach | Monterey |
| Rincon de la Puente del Monte | 1836 | Nicolas Gutierrez | Teodoro Gonzalez | 15,219 acres (6,159 ha) | 101 SD | Gonzales | Monterey |
| Las Salinas | 1836 | Nicolás Gutiérrez | Gabriel Espinoza | 4,414 acres (1,786 ha) | 158 SD | Marina | Monterey |
| James Meadows Tract | 1840 | Juan Alvarado | José Antonio Romero | 4,592 acres (1,858 ha) | 159 SD | Carmel Valley, California | Monterey |
| Caymus | 1836 | Nicolas Gutierrez | George C. Yount | 11,887 acres (4,810 ha) | 32 ND | Rutherford, Yountville | Napa |
| San Joaquin | 1836 | Nicolas Gutierrez | Cruz Cervantes | 7,424 acres (3,004 ha) | 3 ND | | San Benito |
| Valle de San Jose | 1836 | Nicolas Gutierrez | Silvestre de la Portilla | 17,634 acres (7,136 ha) | 144 SD | | San Diego |
| San Isidro Ajajolojol | 1836, 1840 | Nicolas Gutierrez | José López | 26,019.53 acres (10,530 ha) | Not before Land Commission | San Isidro, Tijuana Municipality | Municipio de Tijuana, Baja California, Mexico |
| Entre Napa | 1836 | Mariano Chico | Nicolas Higuera | 5,464 acres (2,211 ha) | 365 ND | Napa | Napa |
| Guadalasca | 1836 | Mariano Chico | Ysabel Yorba | 30,594 acres (12,381 ha) | 177 SD | Camarillo, Point Mugu | Ventura |
| San Jose | 1837 | Juan Alvarado | Ygnacio Palomares and Ricardo Vejar | 22,000 acres (8,903 ha) | 128 SD | Pomona, San Dimas, Covina | Los Angeles |
| Los Gatos or Santa Rita | 1837 | Juan Alvarado | José Trinidad Espinoza | 4,424 acres (1,790 ha) | 276 SD | Santa Rita | Monterey |
| Bolsa de las Escorpinas | 1837 | Juan Alvarado | Salvador Espinoza | 6,416 acres (2,596 ha) | 67 SD | | Monterey |
| La Natividad | 1837 | Juan Alvarado | Manuel Butron and Nicolas Alviso | 8,641 acres (3,497 ha) | 361 SD | Salinas | Monterey |
| San Juan Cajón de Santa Ana | 1837 | Juan Alvarado | Juan Pacífico Ontiveros | 35,970 acres (14,557 ha) | 140 SD | Anaheim, Fullerton, Placentia | Orange |
| Santa Manuela | 1837 | Juan Alvarado | Francis Branch | 16,955 acres (6,861 ha) | 24 SD | Arroyo Grande | San Luis Obispo |
| Suey | 1837 | Juan Alvarado | Ramona Carrillo Pacheco Wilson | 48,834 acres (19,762 ha) | 14 SD | | San Luis Obispo |
| Bolsa de Chamisal | 1837 | Juan Alvarado | Francisco Quijado | 14,335 acres (5,801 ha) | 36 SD | | San Luis Obispo |
| Nipomo | 1837 | Juan Alvarado | William Dana | 37,888 acres (15,333 ha) | 13 SD | Nipomo | San Luis Obispo |
| Las Cruces | 1837 | Juan Alvarado | Miguel Cordero | 8,888 acres (3,597 ha) | 430 ND | | Santa Barbara |
| Jesús María | 1837 | Juan Alvarado | Lucas Antonio Olivera and Jose A. Olivera | 42,149 acres (17,057 ha) | 268 SD | Vandenberg Air Force Base | Santa Barbara |
| Lompoc | 1837 | Juan Alvarado | Jose Antonio Carrillo | 42,085 acres (17,031 ha) | 15 SD | Lompoc | Santa Barbara |
| Punta de la Concepcion | 1837 | Juan Alvarado | Anastasio Jose Carrillo | 24,992 acres (10,114 ha) | 118 SD | Point Conception | Santa Barbara |
| San Julian | 1837 | Juan Alvarado | José de la Guerra y Noriega | 48,222 acres (19,515 ha) | 10 SD | Lompoc | Santa Barbara |
| Sausal Redondo | (1822), 1837 | Juan Alvarado | Antonio Ygnacio Avila | 22,458 acres (9,088 ha) | 354 SD | Manhattan Beach, Lawndale | Los Angeles |
| Tepusquet | 1837 | Juan Alvarado | Tomas Olivera | 15,526 acres (6,283 ha) | 336 SD | | Santa Barbara |
| Tinaquaic | 1837 | Juan Alvarado | Victor Linares | 8,875 acres (3,592 ha) | 200 SD | Santa Maria | Santa Barbara |
| San Francisquito | 1837 | Juan Alvarado | Antonio Buelna | 1,471 acres (595 ha) | 206 ND | Palo Alto | Santa Clara |
| Bolsa del Pajaro | 1837 | Juan Alvarado | Sebastian Rodriguez | 5,496 acres (2,224 ha) | 283 SD | Watsonville | Santa Cruz |
| Aguajito (Villagrana) | 1837 | Juan B. Alvarado | Miguel Villagrana | 44.32 acres (18 ha) | 282 SD | Santa Cruz | Santa Cruz |
| Los Guilicos | 1837 | Juan Alvarado | John Wilson | 18,834 acres (7,622 ha) | 94 ND | Kenwood | Sonoma |
| Calleguas | 1837 | Juan Alvarado | Jose Pedro Ruiz | 9,998 acres (4,046 ha) | 60 SD | Camarillo | Ventura |
| Ojai | 1837 | Juan Alvarado | Fernando Tico | 17,717 acres (7,170 ha) | 168 SD | Ojai | Ventura |
| El Rio de Santa Clara o la Colonia | 1837 | Juan Alvarado | Valentine Cota et al. | 44,883 acres (18,164 ha) | 231 SD | Port Hueneme, Oxnard | Ventura |
| Santa Ana | 1837 | Juan Alvarado | Crisogomo Ayala and Cosme Vanegas | 21,522 acres (8,710 ha) | 97 SD | Oak View | Ventura |
| Santa Clara del Norte | 1837 | Juan Alvarado | Juan M. Sanchez | 13,989 acres (5,661 ha) | 90 SD | El Rio | Ventura |
| Rodeo de las Aguas | 1838 | Juan Alvarado | Maria Rita Valdez de Villa | 4,419 acres (1,788 ha) | 371 SD | Beverly Hills | Los Angeles |
| Huerta de Cuati | 1838 | Juan Alvarado | Victoria Reid | 127 acres (51 ha) | 171 SD | San Marino | Los Angeles |
| Saucelito | 1838 | Juan Alvarado | William A. Richardson | 19,572 acres (7,921 ha) | 83 ND | Sausalito | Marin |
| Milpitas | 1838 | Juan Alvarado | Ygnacio Pastor | 43,281 acres (17,515 ha) | 44 SD | Fort Hunter Liggett, Jolon | Monterey |
| Napa | 1838 | Juan Alvarado | Salvador Vallejo | 22,718 acres (9,194 ha) | 212 ND | Napa | Napa |
| Jurupa | 1838 | Juan Alvarado | Juan Bandini | 40,569 acres (16,418 ha) | 213 SD, 263 SD | Riverside, Jurupa Valley | Riverside |
| Butano | 1838 | Juan Alvarado | Ramona Sanchez | 4,440 acres (1,797 ha) | 271 ND | | San Mateo |
| Cañada de Verde y Arroyo de la Purisima | 1838 | Juan Alvarado | José María Alviso | 8,906 acres (3,604 ha) | 350 ND | | San Mateo |
| La Zaca | 1838 | Juan Alvarado | Antonio | 4,458 acres (1,804 ha) | 241 SD | | Santa Barbara |
| Rincon de Los Esteros | 1838 | Juan Alvarado | Ignacio Alviso | 6,353 acres (2,571 ha) | 204 ND, 238 ND, 239 ND | Milpitas, San Jose | Santa Clara |
| Carbonera | 1838 | Juan Alvarado | Jose Guillermo Bocle | 2,225 acres (900 ha) | 255 ND | Santa Cruz | Santa Cruz |
| La Ballona | 1839 | Juan Alvarado | Machado and Talamantes families | 13,920 acres (5,633 ha) | 123 SD | Culver City, Venice | Los Angeles |
| Agua Caliente | 1839 | Juan Alvarado | Fulgencio Higuera | 9,564 acres (3,870 ha) | 133 ND | Fremont | Alameda |
| Las Positas | 1839 | Juan Alvarado | Robert Livermore and Jose Noriega | 8,880 acres (3,594 ha) | 135 ND | Livermore | Alameda |
| Santa Rita | 1839 | Juan Alvarado | Jose Pacheco | 8,894 acres (3,599 ha) | 155 ND | Pleasanton | Alameda |
| Valle de San Jose | 1839 | Juan Alvarado | Antonio Maria Pico | 48,436 acres (19,601 ha) | 102 ND | Sunol | Alameda |
| Los Medanos | 1839 | Juan Alvarado | Jose Antonio Mesa and Jose Miguel Garcia | 8,859 acres (3,585 ha) | 291 ND, 364 ND | Pittsburg | Contra Costa |
| San Vicente y Santa Monica | 1839 | Juan Alvarado | Francisco Sepúlveda | 33,000 acres (13,355 ha) | 143 SD | Santa Monica | Los Angeles |
| Boca de Santa Monica | 1839 | Juan Alvarado | Francisco Marquez and Ysidro Reyes | 6,656 acres (2,694 ha) | 141 SD | Santa Monica | Los Angeles |
| Novato | 1839 | Juan Alvarado | Fernando Feliz | 8,871 acres (3,590 ha) | 223 ND | Novato | Marin |
| Corte Madera de Novato | 1839 | Juan Alvarado | John (Juan) Martin | 8,878 acres (3,593 ha) | 61 ND | Novato | Marin |
| Cañada de la Segunda | 1839 | José Castro | Lazaro Soto | 4,367 acres (1,767 ha) | 356 SD | Carmel Valley | Monterey |
| Los Laureles | 1839 | Juan Alvarado | José M. Boronda and Vicente Blas Martínez | 6,625 acres (2,681 ha) | 240 SD | Carmel Valley Village | Monterey |
| Nacional | 1839 | Juan Alvarado | Vicente Cantua | 6,633 acres (2,684 ha) | 70 SD | Salinas | Monterey |
| Posa de los Ositos | 1839 | Juan Alvarado | Carlos Cayetano Espinoza | 16,939 acres (6,855 ha) | 209 SD | Greenfield | Monterey |
| Paraje de Sanchez | 1839 | Juan Alvarado | Francisco Lugo | 6,584 acres (2,664 ha) | 230 SD | | Monterey |
| Potrero de San Carlos | 1839 | Juan Alvarado | Fructuoso del Real | 4,307 acres (1,743 ha) | 333 SD | | Monterey |
| San Jose y Sur Chiquito | 1839 | Juan Alvarado | Marcelino Escobar | 8,876 acres (3,592 ha) | 373 SD | | Monterey |
| Cañada de Pala | 1839 | Juan Alvarado | José de Jesús Bernal | 15,714 acres (6,359 ha) | 373 ND | | Santa Clara |
| La Habra | 1839 | Juan Alvarado | Mariano Roldan | 6,698 acres (2,711 ha) | 355 SD | La Habra | Orange |
| Santa Ana y Quien Sabe | 1839 | Juan Alvarado | Francisco Negrete | 48,823 acres (19,758 ha) | 258 SD | | San Benito |
| San Justo | 1839 | Juan Alvarado | José Castro | 34,620 acres (14,010 ha) | 211 SD | Hollister | San Benito |
| Cucamonga | 1839 | Juan Alvarado | Tiburcio Tapia | 13,000 acres (5,261 ha) | 214 SD | Rancho Cucamonga | San Bernardino |
| El Rincon | 1839 | Juan Alvarado | Juan Bandini | 4,431 acres (1,793 ha) | 297 SD | Prado Regional Park | San Bernardino, Riverside |
| San Pedro | 1839 | Juan Alvarado | Francisco Sanchez | 8,926 acres (3,612 ha) | 82 ND | Pacifica | San Mateo |
| San Gregorio | 1839 | Juan Alvarado | Antonio Buelna | 17,783 acres (7,197 ha) | 88 ND, 89 ND | San Gregorio | San Mateo |
| Los Alamos | 1839 | Juan Alvarado | Jose Antonio de la Guerra | 48,803 acres (19,750 ha) | 83 SD | Los Alamos | Santa Barbara |
| Santa Cruz Island | 1839 | Juan Alvarado | Andrés Castillero | 52,760 acres (21,351 ha) | 340 SD | Santa Cruz Island | Santa Barbara |
| Rinconada de Los Gatos | 1839 | Juan Alvarado | Jose Maria Hernandez and Sebastian Fabian Peralta | 6,631 acres (2,683 ha) | 164 ND | Los Gatos, Monte Sereno | Santa Clara |
| Secuan | (1833), 1839 | Juan Alvarado | Juan Bautisa Lopez | unknown | | Dehesa, Sycuan Reservation | San Diego |
| Rancho San Antonio de Padua | 1839 | Juan Alvarado | Juan Prado Mesa | 3,542 acres (1,433 ha) | 275 ND, 354 ND, 366 ND, 368 ND, 378 ND, 383 ND | Los Altos | Santa Clara |
| Refugio | 1839 | Juan Alvarado | María Candida, Jacinta, and María de los Angeles Castro | 12,147 acres (4,916 ha) | 275 SD, 286 SD | Santa Cruz | Santa Cruz |
| San Francisco | 1839 | Juan Alvarado | Antonio del Valle | 48,612 acres (19,673 ha) | 303 SD | Camulos, Piru, Santa Clarita | Ventura |
| Cañada de Herrera | 1839 | Manuel Jimeno | Domingo Sais | 6,658 acres (2,694 ha) | 65 ND | Fairfax | Marin |
| Chualar | 1839 | Manuel Jimeno | Juan Malarin | 8,890 acres (3,598 ha) | 110 SD | Chualar | Monterey |
| Zanjones | 1839 | Manuel Jimeno | Gabriel de la Torre | 6,714 acres (2,717 ha) | 108 SD | | Monterey |
| Rincon de las Salinas y Potrero Viejo | 1839 | Manuel Jimeno | Cornelio Bernal | 4,446 acres (1,799 ha) | 5 ND | Hunters Point | San Francisco |
| Corral de Tierra | 1839 | Manuel Jimeno | Francisco Guerrero y Palomares | 7,766 acres (3,143 ha) | 49 ND | Princeton | San Mateo |
| Corral de Tierra | 1839 | Manuel Jimeno | Tiburcio Vasquez | 4,436 acres (1,795 ha) | 167 ND | | San Mateo |
| Santa Rosa | 1839 | Manuel Jimeno | Francisco Cota | 15,526 acres (6,283 ha) | 294 SD | Buellton | Santa Barbara |
| Cañada de San Felipe y Las Animas | 1839 | Manuel Jimeno | Thomas Bowen | 8,788 acres (3,556 ha) | 332 SD | | Santa Clara |
| Estero Americano | 1839 | Manuel Jimeno | Edward M. McIntosh | 8,849 acres (3,581 ha) | 41 ND | Freestone | Sonoma |
| Tulucay | 1840 | Manuel Jimeno | Cayetano Juarez | 8,866 acres (3,588 ha) | 63 ND | Napa | Napa |
| Pismo | 1840 | Manuel Jimeno | Jose Ortega | 8,839 acres (3,577 ha) | 120 SD | Arroyo Grande, Pismo Beach | San Luis Obispo |
| Las Camaritas | 1840 | Juan Alvarado | José de Jesus Noé | 18.57 acres (8 ha) | 387 ND | San Francisco | San Francisco |
| Arroyo Seco | 1840 | Juan Alvarado | Teodocio Yorba | 48,857 acres (19,772 ha) | 199 ND | Ione | Amador |
| Tujunga | 1840 | Juan Alvarado | Francisco and Pedro Lopez | 6,661 acres (2,696 ha) | 52 SD | Tujunga | Los Angeles |
| Los Nogales | 1840 | Juan Alvarado | Jose Ynes de la Luz Linares | 1,004 acres (406 ha) | 88 SD | Diamond Bar | Los Angeles |
| Punta de Quentin | 1840 | Juan Alvarado | John B.R. Cooper | 8,878 acres (3,593 ha) | 372 ND | San Quentin | Marin |
| San Jose | 1840 | Juan Alvarado | Ygnacio Pacheco | 6,659 acres (2,695 ha) | 40 ND | Ignacio | Marin |
| Arroyo Seco | 1840 | Juan Alvarado | Joaquín de la Torre | 16,523 acres (6,687 ha) | 40 SD | Greenfield | Monterey |
| Rincon de Sanjon | 1840 | Juan Alvarado | Jose Eusebio Boronda | 2,230 acres (902 ha) | 244 SD | Salinas | Monterey |
| Bolsa de San Felipe | 1840 | Juan Alvarado | Francisco Pérez Pacheco | 6,795 acres (2,750 ha) | 77 SD | | San Benito |
| Jamacha | 1840 | Juan Alvarado | Apolinara Lorenzana | 8,881 acres (3,594 ha) | 48 SD | Spring Valley | San Diego |
| Vallecitos de San Marcos | 1840 | Juan Alvarado | Jose María Alvarado | 35,573 acres (14,396 ha) | 192 SD | San Marcos | San Diego |
| Paguai | 1840 | Juan Alvarado | Rosario E. Aguilar | | | Poway | San Diego |
| San Bernardo | 1840 | Juan Alvarado | Vicente Canet | 4,379 acres (1,772 ha) | 41 SD | Morro Bay | San Luis Obispo |
| Piedra Blanca | 1840 | Juan Alvarado | José de Jesús Pico | 48,806 acres (19,751 ha) | 43 SD | San Simeon | San Luis Obispo |
| Cañada de Raymundo | 1840 | Juan Alvarado | John Coppinger | 12,545 acres (5,077 ha) | 75 ND | Woodside | San Mateo |
| Casmalia | 1840 | Juan Alvarado | Antonio Olivera | 8,841 acres (3,578 ha) | 284 SD | Casmalia | Santa Barbara |
| Guadalupe | 1840 | Juan Alvarado | Diego Olivera and Teodoro Arellanes | 43,681 acres (17,677 ha) | 39 SD | Guadalupe | Santa Barbara |
| La Purisima Concepcion | 1840 | Juan Alvarado | Jose Gorgonio | 4,439 acres (1,796 ha) | 130 ND | Los Altos Hills | Santa Clara |
| Arroyo de la Laguna | 1840 | Juan Alvarado | Gil Sanchez | 4,418 acres (1,788 ha) | 345 ND | Davenport | Santa Cruz |
| Tolenas | 1840 | Juan Alvarado | Jose Armijo | 13,316 acres (5,389 ha) | 162 ND | Fairfield | Solano |
| Agua Caliente | 1840 | Juan Alvarado | Lazaro Pina | 3,219 acres (1,303 ha) | 153 ND, 325 ND,325 ND,325 ND, | Fetters Hot Springs-Agua Caliente | Sonoma |
| San Miguel | 1840 | Juan Alvarado | William Marcus West | 6,663 acres (2,696 ha) | 326 ND | Mark West | Sonoma |
| Locoallomi | 1841 | Manuel Jimeno | William (Julien) Pope | 8,873 acres (3,591 ha) | 154 ND | Pope Valley | Napa |
| Huichica | 1841 | Manuel Jimeno | Jacob P. Leese | 18,704 acres (7,569 ha) | 50 ND | Napa | Napa |
| Santa Margarita | 1841 | Manuel Jimeno | Joaquin Estrada | 17,735 acres (7,177 ha) | 149 SD | Santa Margarita | San Luis Obispo |
| Cañada del Corral | 1841 | Manuel Jimeno | Jose Dolores Ortega | 8,876 acres (3,592 ha) | 152 SD | Gaviota | Santa Barbara |
| Cabeza de Santa Rosa | 1841 | Manuel Jimeno | Maria Ygnacia Lopez | 8,885 acres (3,596 ha) | 124 ND | Santa Rosa | Sonoma |
| San Lorenzo | 1841 | Juan Alvarado | Guillermo Castro | 26,722 acres (10,814 ha) | 29 ND | Castro Valley, Hayward | Alameda |
| Laguna de los Palos Colorados | 1841 | Juan Alvarado | Joaquin Moraga, Juan Bernal | 13,316 acres (5,389 ha) | 276 ND | Lafayette | Contra Costa |
| El Sobrante | 1841 | Juan Alvarado | Juan Jose Castro and Victor Castro | 20,565 acres (8,322 ha) | 403 ND | El Sobrante | Contra Costa |
| Azusa de Dalton | 1841 | Juan Alvarado | Luis Arenas | 4,431 acres (1,793 ha) | 121 SD | Azusa | Los Angeles |
| Azusa de Duarte | 1841 | Juan Alvarado | Andrés Duarte | 6,596 acres (2,669 ha) | 46 SD | Duarte | Los Angeles |
| Rincon de la Brea | 1841 | Juan Alvarado | Gil Ybarra | 4,452 acres (1,802 ha) | 85 SD | Brea | Los Angeles |
| Sanjon de Santa Rita | 1841 | Juan Alvarado | Francisco Soberanes | 48,824 acres (19,758 ha) | 206 SD | Santa Rita Park | Merced |
| Los Coches | 1841 | Juan Alvarado | Maria Josefa Soberanes | 8,794 acres (3,559 ha) | 202 SD | | Monterey |
| San Lorenzo | 1841 | Juan Alvarado | Feliciano Soberanes | 21,884 acres (8,856 ha) | 27 SD | King City | Monterey |
| San Bernabe | 1841 | Juan Alvarado | Petronelo Rios | 13,297 acres (5,381 ha) | 306 SD | San Ardo | Monterey |
| San Bernardo | 1841 | Juan Alvarado | Mariano Soberanes and Juan Soberanes | 13,346 acres (5,401 ha) | 223 SD | | Monterey |
| San Miguelito de Trinidad | 1841 | Juan Alvarado | José Rafael Gonzales | 22,136 acres (8,958 ha) | 18 SD | | Monterey |
| Carne Humana | 1841 | Juan Alvarado | Edward Turner Bale | 17,962 acres (7,269 ha) | 47 ND | Calistoga, St. Helena | Napa |
| Yajome | 1841 | Juan Alvarado | Damaso Antonio Rodriquez | 6,653 acres (2,692 ha) | 39 ND | Napa | Napa |
| La Bolsa Chica | 1841 | Juan Alvarado | Joaquín Ruíz | 8,107 acres (3,281 ha) | 205 SD | Huntington Beach | Orange |
| Santa Margarita y Las Flores | 1841 | Juan Alvarado | Pio Pico | 133,440 acres (54,001 ha) | 367 SD | Mission Viejo | Orange |
| New Helvetia | 1841 | Juan Alvarado | John Sutter | 48,818 acres (19,756 ha) | 319 ND, 341 ND, 416 ND, 417 ND | Sacramento | Sacramento |
| Santa Ana del Chino | 1841 | Juan Alvarado | Antonio Maria Lugo | 22,193 acres (8,981 ha) | 182 SD | Chino, Chino Hills | San Bernardino |
| Corral de Piedra | 1841 | Juan Alvarado | Jose Villavicencia | 30,911 acres (12,509 ha) | 45 SD | Edna | San Luis Obispo |
| Santa Rosa | 1841 | Juan Alvarado | Julian Estrada | 13,183 acres (5,335 ha) | 73 SD | Cambria | San Luis Obispo |
| San Luisito | 1841 | Juan Alvarado | Guadalupe Cantua | 4,390 acres (1,777 ha) | 26 SD | San Luis Obispo | San Luis Obispo |
| Miramontes | 1841 | Juan Alvarado | Candelario Miramontes | 4,424 acres (1,790 ha) | 269 ND | Half Moon Bay | San Mateo |
| Cañada de Guadalupe la Visitación y Rodeo Viejo | 1841 | Juan Alvarado | Jacob P. Leese | 943 acres (382 ha) | 105 ND, 151 ND, 237 ND, 285 ND | Brisbane | San Mateo |
| Todos Santos y San Antonio | 1841 | Juan Alvarado | W.E.P. Hartnell | 20,772 acres (8,406 ha) | 357 SD | | Santa Barbara |
| Quito | 1841 | Juan Alvarado | José Zenon Fernandez and Jose Noriega | 13,310 acres (5,386 ha) | 226 ND | Cupertino, Saratoga | Santa Clara |
| Rincon de San Francisquito | 1841 | Juan Alvarado | José Peña | 8,418 acres (3,407 ha) | 81 ND | Palo Alto | Santa Clara |
| Rinconada del Arroyo de San Francisquito | 1841 | Juan Alvarado | Maria Mesa | 2,229 acres (902 ha) | 129 ND | Menlo Park | Santa Clara |
| Potrero de San Francisco | 1841 | Juan Alvarado | Francisco and Ramón de Haro | 2,229 acres (902 ha) | 381 ND | Potrero Hill | San Francisco |
| Cañada Larga o Verde | 1841 | Juan Alvarado | Joaquina Alvarado | 6,659 acres (2,695 ha) | 81 SD | Ventura | Ventura |
| San Miguel | 1841 | Juan Alvarado | Raimundo Olivas, Felipe Lorenzana | 4,694 acres (1,900 ha) | 65 SD | Ventura | Ventura |
| Arroyo de la Alameda | 1842 | Juan Alvarado | Jose Jesus Vallejo | 17,705 acres (7,165 ha) | 60 ND | Niles | Alameda |
| San Lorenzo Baja | 1842 | Juan Alvarado | Francisco Soto | 6,686 acres (2,706 ha) | 300 ND | San Lorenzo | Alameda |
| San Leandro | 1842 | Juan Alvarado | José Joaquin Estudillo | 6,829 acres (2,764 ha) | 234 ND | San Leandro | Alameda |
| Boca de la Cañada del Pinole | 1842 | Juan Alvarado | Maria Manuela Valencia | 13,316 acres (5,389 ha) | 138 ND | Martinez, Lafayette | Contra Costa |
| El Pinole | 1842 | Juan Alvarado | Ygnacio Martinez | 17,761 acres (7,188 ha) | 205 ND | Martinez, Pinole | Contra Costa |
| Cañada del Hambre y Las Bolsas | 1842 | Juan Alvarado | Teodora Soto | 13,354 acres (5,404 ha) | 308 ND | Lafayette, Moraga | Contra Costa |
| San Emidio | 1842 | Juan Alvarado | Jose Antonio Dominguez | 17,710 acres (7,167 ha) | 344 SD | | Kern |
| La Puente | 1842 | Juan Alvarado | John A. Rowland | 48,790 acres (19,745 ha) | 127 SD | Baldwin Park, La Puente, Covina | Los Angeles |
| Los Carneros | 1842 | Juan Alvarado | María Antonia Linares | 1,629 acres (659 ha) | 384 SD | | Monterey |
| Los Ojitos | 1842 | Juan Alvarado | Mariano Soberanes | 8,900 acres (3,602 ha) | 221 SD | Jolon | Monterey |
| El Piojo | 1842 | Juan Alvarado | Joaquin Soto | 13,320 acres (5,390 ha) | 210 SD | | Monterey |
| Potrero Y Rincon de San Pedro Regalado | 1842 | Juan Alvarado | Jose Arana | 91.53 acres (37 ha) | 213 SD | Santa Cruz | Santa Cruz |
| San Benito | 1842 | Juan Alvarado | Francisco Garcia | 6,671 acres (2,700 ha) | 68 SD | San Ardo | Monterey |
| San Lorenzo | 1842 | Juan Alvarado | Francisco Rico | 22,264 acres (9,010 ha) | 253 SD | | Monterey |
| San Lucas | 1842 | Juan Alvarado | Rafael Estrada | 8,875 acres (3,592 ha) | 34 SD | San Lucas | Monterey |
| San Joaquín | 1842 | Juan Alvarado | José Andres Sepúlveda | 48,803 acres (19,750 ha) | 185 SD | Irvine, Newport Beach | Orange |
| Niguel | 1842 | Juan Alvarado | Juan Avila | 13,316 acres (5,389 ha) | 130 SD | Laguna Niguel, Laguna Beach | Orange |
| Cañada de los Alisos | 1842 | Juan Alvarado | José Serrano | 10,668 acres (4,317 ha) | 31 SD | Lake Forest (El Toro) | Orange |
| San Jacinto Viejo | 1842 | Manuel Jimeno | José Antonio Estudillo | 35,503 acres (14,368 ha) | 233 SD | San Jacinto, Hemet | Riverside |
| San Bernardino | 1842 | Juan Alvarado | Antonio Maria Lugo | 37,700 acres (15,257 ha) | 12 SD | San Bernardino | San Bernardino |
| Cienega de los Paicines | 1842 | Juan Alvarado | Angel Castro and Jose Rodriguez | 8,918 acres (3,609 ha) | 220 SD | Paicines | San Benito |
| Lomerias Muertas | 1842 | Juan Alvarado | José Castro | 6,660 acres (2,695 ha) | 105 SD | | San Benito |
| Arroyo Grande | 1842 | Juan Alvarado | Zefarino Carlón | 4,437 acres (1,796 ha) | 75 SD | | San Luis Obispo |
| Atascadero | 1842 | Juan Alvarado | Trifon Garcia | 4,348 acres (1,760 ha) | 113 SD | Atascadero | San Luis Obispo |
| de Santa Fe | 1842 | Juan Alvarado | Victor Linares | 165.76 acres (67 ha) | SD 11 | San Luis Obispo | San Luis Obispo |
| Cañada de los Osos | 1842 | Juan Alvarado | Victor Linares | 23,574.2 acres (9,540 ha) | SD 218 | Los Osos Valley, Montaña de Oro State Park | San Luis Obispo |
| Huerhuero | 1842 | Juan Alvarado | Mariano Bonilla | 15,685 acres (6,347 ha) | 196 SD | Creston | San Luis Obispo |
| Huerta de Romualdo | 1842 | Juan Alvarado | Romualdo | 117 acres (47 ha) | 261 SD | Cerro Romauldo | San Luis Obispo |
| Moro y Cayucos | 1842 | Juan Alvarado | Martin Olivera and Vicente Feliz | 8,045 acres (3,256 ha) | 155 SD | Cayucos | San Luis Obispo |
| Potrero de San Luis Obispo | 1842 | Juan Alvarado | Maria Concepcion Boronda | 3,506 acres (1,419 ha) | 304 SD | San Luis Obispo | San Luis Obispo |
| San Geronimo | 1842 | Juan Alvarado | Rafael Villavicencio | 8,893 acres (3,599 ha) | 8 SD | | San Luis Obispo |
| San Miguelito | 1842 | Juan Alvarado | Miguel Ávila | 14,198 acres (5,746 ha) | 37 SD, 38 SD, 74 SD | Avila Beach | San Luis Obispo |
| San Simeon | 1842 | Juan Alvarado | José Ramón Estrada | 4,469 acres (1,809 ha) | 320 SD | | San Luis Obispo |
| Las Encinitas | 1842 | Juan Alvarado | Andrés Ybarra | 4,434 acres (1,794 ha) | 228 SD | Encinitas | San Diego |
| San Bernardo | 1842 | Juan Alvarado | Jose Francisco Snook | 17,763 acres (7,188 ha) | 341 SD | Rancho Bernardo | San Diego |
| Agua Hedionda | 1842 | Juan Alvarado | Juan María Marrón | 13,311 acres (5,387 ha) | 238 SD | Carlsbad | San Diego |
| Punta del Año Nuevo | 1842 | Juan Alvarado | Simeon Castro | 17,753 acres (7,184 ha) | 199 ND | | San Mateo |
| Cañada de los Capitancillos | 1842 | Juan Alvarado | Justo Larios | 1,110 acres (449 ha) | 142 ND | San Jose | Santa Clara |
| Los Capitancillos | 1842 | Juan Alvarado | Justo Larios | 3,360 acres (1,360 ha) | 132 ND | San Jose | Santa Clara |
| Pastoria de las Borregas | 1842 | Juan Alvarado | Francisco Estrada | 9,066 acres (3,669 ha) | 84 ND and 97 ND | Sunnyvale, Mountain View | Santa Clara |
| San Vicente | 1842 | Juan Alvarado | José de los Reyes Berreyesa | 4,438 acres (1,796 ha) | 363 ND | San Jose | Santa Clara |
| Las Uvas | 1842 | Juan Alvarado | Lorenzo Pineda | 11,080 acres (4,484 ha) | 174 SD | Morgan Hill | Santa Clara |
| Dos Pueblos | 1842 | Juan Alvarado | Nicolas A. Den | 15,535 acres (6,287 ha) | 150 SD | Goleta | Santa Barbara |
| Rio de los Putos | 1842 | Juan Alvarado | William Wolfskill | 17,755 acres (7,185 ha) | 232 ND | Winters | Solano |
| Suisun | 1842 | Juan Alvarado | Francisco Solano | 17,755 acres (7,185 ha) | 2 ND | Fairfield | Solano |
| Laguna de Tache | 1843 | Manuel Micheltorena | Joseph Yves Limantour | (Note: Claim rejected.) | 311 SD | Hanford | Fresno |
| El Tejon | 1843 | Manuel Micheltorena | José Antonio Aguirre and Ygnacio del Valle | 97,617 acres (39,504 ha) | 327 SD | | Kern |
| Castac | 1843 | Manuel Micheltorena | Jose Maria Covarrubias | 22,178 acres (8,975 ha) | 349 SD | Lebec, Grapevine | Kern |
| Cañada de los Pinos | 1843 | Manuel Micheltorena | Seminary of Santa Inez | 35,499 acres (14,366 ha) | 388 SD | Santa Ynez, Solvang | Santa Barbara |
| La Cañada | 1843 | Manuel Micheltorena | Ygnacio Coronel | 5,745 acres (2,325 ha) | 163 SD | Eagle Rock, La Cañada Flintridge | Los Angeles |
| San Jose de Buenos Ayres | 1843 | Manuel Micheltorena | Maximo Alanis | 4,438 acres (1,796 ha) | 305 SD | Westwood | Los Angeles |
| La Tajauta | 1843 | Manuel Micheltorena | Anastasio Avila | 3,559 acres (1,440 ha) | 354 SD | Watts, Willowbrook | Los Angeles |
| La Cienega o Paso de la Tijera | 1843 | Manuel Micheltorena | Vicente Sanchez | 4,219 acres (1,707 ha) | 376 SD | Los Angeles | Los Angeles |
| Providencia | 1843 | Manuel Micheltorena | Vicente de la Ossa | 4,000 acres (1,619 ha) | 30 SD | Burbank | Los Angeles |
| Cahuenga | 1843 | Manuel Micheltorena | José Miguel Triunfo | 388 acres (157 ha) | 321 SD | Burbank & Toluca Lake | Los Angeles |
| Olompali | 1843 | Manuel Micheltorena | Camilo Ynitia | 8,877 acres (3,592 ha) | 10 ND | Novato, Petaluma | Marin |
| Punta de los Reyes Sobrante | 1843 | Manuel Micheltorena | Antonio Maria Osio | 48,189 acres (19,501 ha) | 236 ND | Point Reyes | Marin |
| Cienega del Gabilan | 1843 | Manuel Micheltorena | Antonio Chaves | 48,781 acres (19,741 ha) | 314 SD | | Monterey |
| La Jota | 1843 | Manuel Micheltorena | George C. Yount | 4,454 acres (1,802 ha) | 34 ND | Napa | Napa |
| Las Putas | 1843 | Manuel Micheltorena | Jose de Jesus Berreyesa and Sexto Berreyesa | 35,516 acres (14,373 ha) | 175 ND | Lake Berryessa | Napa |
| Mallacomes | 1843 | Manuel Micheltorena | José de los Santos Berreyesa | 17,742 acres (7,180 ha) | 150 ND, 161 ND, 375 ND | Calistoga, Knights Valley | Napa |
| San Jacinto y San Gorgonio | 1843 | Manuel Micheltorena | James (Santiago) Johnson | 4,440 acres (1,797 ha) | 269 SD | Moreno Valley | Riverside |
| Cañada de los Coches | 1843 | Manuel Micheltorena | Apolinaria Lorenzana | 28 acres (11 ha) | 266 SD | Lakeside | San Diego |
| Rincon del Diablo | 1843 | Manuel Micheltorena | Juan Alvarado | 12,653 acres (5,120 ha) | 312 SD | Escondido, Rincon Del Diablo | San Diego |
| Valle de Pamo | 1843 | Manuel Micheltorena | José Joaquin Ortega and Edward Stokes | 17,709 acres (7,167 ha) | 195 SD | Ramona | San Diego |
| Pescadero | 1843 | Manuel Micheltorena | Antonio Maria Pico | 35,546 acres (14,385 ha) | 170 ND | Tracy | San Joaquin |
| Huasna | 1843 | Manuel Micheltorena | Isaac J. Sparks | 22,153 acres (8,965 ha) | 69 SD | Huasna | San Luis Obispo |
| Pecho y Islay | 1843 | Manuel Micheltorena | Francisco Badillo | 8,856.8 acres (3,584 ha) | 28 SD | Irish Hills, Montaña de Oro State Park, Diablo Canyon Power Plant | San Luis Obispo |
| Nojoqui | 1843 | Manuel Micheltorena | Raimundo Carrillo | 13,284 acres (5,376 ha) | 29 SD | Solvang | Santa Barbara |
| Cuyama | 1843 | Manuel Micheltorena | José María Rojo | 22,193 acres (8,981 ha) | 365 SD | Cuyama | Santa Barbara |
| Las Positas y La Calera | 1843 | Manuel Micheltorena | Narciso Fabregat and Thomas M. Robbins | 3,282 acres (1,328 ha) | 184 SD | Hope Ranch | Santa Barbara |
| Santa Rosa Island | 1843 | Manuel Micheltorena | José Antonio Carrillo and Carlos Antonio Carrillo | 62,696 acres (25,372 ha) | 56 SD | Santa Rosa Island | Santa Barbara |
| San Luis Gonzaga | 1843 | Manuel Micheltorena | Juan Pacheco and Jose Mejia | 48,821 acres (19,757 ha) | 62 ND | | Santa Clara |
| Agua Puerca y las Trancas | 1843 | Manuel Micheltorena | Ramon Rodriguez and Francisco Alviso | 4,421 acres (1,789 ha) | 250 ND | Swanton | Santa Cruz |
| Los Putos | 1843 | Manuel Micheltorena | Juan Vaca and Juan Peña | 44,384 acres (17,962 ha) | 74 ND | Vacaville | Solano |
| Suscol | 1843 | Manuel Micheltorena | Mariano Guadalupe Vallejo | | 318 ND | Petaluma, Vallejo | Sonoma |
| Tzabaco | 1843 | Manuel Micheltorena | Jose German Pina | 15,439 acres (6,248 ha) | 374 ND | Geyserville | Sonoma |
| Pescadero | 1843 | Manuel Micheltorena | Valentin Higuera and Rafael Feliz | 35,446 acres (14,344 ha) | 137 ND | Grayson | Stanislaus |
| Del Rio Estanislao | 1843 | Manuel Micheltorena | Francisco Rico and José Castro | 48,887 acres (19,784 ha) | 413 ND | Knights Ferry | Stanislaus |
| Temescal | 1843 | Manuel Micheltorena | Francisco Lopez and Jose Arellanes | 13,339 acres (5,398 ha) | 153 SD | Piru | Ventura |
| Santa Paula y Saticoy | 1843 | Manuel Micheltorena | Manuel Jimeno | 17,773 acres (7,192 ha) | 328 SD | Santa Paula, Saticoy | Ventura |
| Quesesosi | 1843 | Manuel Micheltorena | William Gordon | 8,894 acres (3,599 ha) | 26 ND | Woodland | Yolo |
| Rio de Jesus Maria | 1843 | Manuel Micheltorena | Thomas Hardy | 26,637 acres (10,780 ha) | 360 ND | Yolo | Yolo |
| Potrero de los Cerritos | 1844 | Manuel Micheltorena | Tomas Pacheco and Agustin Alviso | 10,610 acres (4,294 ha) | 119 ND | Union City | Alameda |
| Arroyo Chico | 1844 | Manuel Micheltorena | William Dickey | 22,214 acres (8,990 ha) | 38 ND | Chico | Butte |
| Farwell | 1844 | Manuel Micheltorena | Edward Farwell | 22,194 acres (8,982 ha) | 384 ND | Chico | Butte |
| Esquon | 1844 | Manuel Micheltorena | Samuel Neal | 22,194 acres (8,982 ha) | 179 ND | Esquon | Butte |
| Aguas Frias | 1844 | Manuel Micheltorena | Antonio Osio | 26,761 acres (10,830 ha) | 370 ND | Durham | Butte |
| Las Juntas | 1844 | Manuel Micheltorena | William Welch | 13,293 acres (5,379 ha) | 87 ND | Martinez, Pacheco, Pleasant Hill | Contra Costa |
| Cañada de los Vaqueros | 1844 | Manuel Micheltorena | Francisco Alviso, Antonio Higuera, and Manuel Miranda | 17,760 acres (7,187 ha) | 386 ND | | Contra Costa |
| Jacinto | 1844 | Manuel Micheltorena | Jacinto Rodriguez | 35,488 acres (14,361 ha) | 56 ND | Jacinto | Glenn |
| Larkin's Children | 1844 | Manuel Micheltorena | Children of Thomas O Larkin | 44,364 acres (17,953 ha) | 115 ND | Colusa | Glenn |
| Lupyomi | 1844 | Manuel Micheltorena | Salvador Vallejo and Juan Antonio Vallejo | | 8 ND, 247 ND, 317 ND | Clear Lake | Lake |
| Collayomi | 1844 | Manuel Micheltorena | Robert Ridley | 8,242 acres (3,335 ha) | 14 ND | Middletown | Lake |
| La Merced | 1844 | Manuel Micheltorena | Casilda Soto de Lobo | 2,363 acres (956 ha) | 217 SD | Montebello, Monterey Park | Los Angeles |
| Aguaje de la Centinela | 1844 | Manuel Micheltorena | Ygnacio Machado | 2,219 acres (898 ha) | 125 SD | Westchester | Los Angeles |
| San Geronimo | 1844 | Manuel Micheltorena | Rafael Cacho | 8,701 acres (3,521 ha) | 283 ND | Woodacre, San Geronimo, Forest Knolls, Lagunitas | Marin |
| San Pedro, Santa Margarita y Las Gallinas | 1844 | Manuel Micheltorena | Timothy Murphy | 21,679 acres (8,773 ha) | 16 ND | San Rafael | Marin |
| Soulajule | 1844 | Manuel Micheltorena | José Ramón Mesa | 10,898 acres (4,410 ha) | 328 ND, 329 ND, 331 ND, 334 ND, 336 ND, 352 ND | | Marin |
| Blucher | 1844 | Manuel Micheltorena | Jean Jacques Vioget | 26,759 acres (10,829 ha) | 224 ND | | Marin |
| Nicasio | 1844 | Manuel Micheltorena | Pablo de la Guerra and John B.R. Cooper | 56,621 acres (22,914 ha) | 392 ND, 404 ND | Nicasio | Marin |
| Las Mariposas | 1844 | Manuel Micheltorena | Juan Alvarado | 44,387 acres (17,963 ha) | 1 ND | Mariposa | Mariposa |
| Sanel | 1844 | Manuel Micheltorena | Fernando Feliz | 17,754 acres (7,185 ha) | 22 ND | Hopland | Mendocino |
| Panoche de San Juan y Los Carrisolitos | 1844 | Manuel Micheltorena | Julian Ursua | 22,175 acres (8,974 ha) | 181 SD | | Merced |
| Bolsa del Potrero y Moro Cojo | 1844 | Manuel Micheltorena | Joaquín de la Torre | 6,916 acres (2,799 ha) | 7 SD | Castroville | Monterey |
| Los Laureles | 1844 | Manuel Micheltorena | José Agricio | 718-acre (291 ha) | 187 ND | | Monterey |
| Catacula | 1844 | Manuel Micheltorena | Joseph B. Chiles | 8,546 acres (3,458 ha) | 72 ND | Napa | Napa |
| La Laguna | 1844 | Manuel Micheltorena | Julian Manriquez | 13,339 acres (5,398 ha) | 161 SD | Lake Elsinore, Wildomar | Riverside |
| Pauba | 1844 | Manuel Micheltorena | Vicente Moraga | 26,598 acres (10,764 ha) | 203 SD | Temecula | Riverside |
| Temecula | 1844 | Manuel Micheltorena | Felix Valdez | 26,608 acres (10,768 ha) | 6 SD, 119 SD | Temecula, Murrieta | Riverside |
| Cosumnes | 1844 | Manuel Micheltorena | W.E.P. Hartnell | 26,605 acres (10,767 ha) | 362 ND | | Sacramento |
| Omochumnes | 1844 | Manuel Micheltorena | Jared Dixon Sheldon | 18,662 acres (7,552 ha) | 182 ND | | Sacramento |
| Del Paso | 1844 | Manuel Micheltorena | Elias Grimes | 44,371 acres (17,956 ha) | 53 ND | Sacramento | Sacramento |
| Rio de los Americanos | 1844 | Manuel Micheltorena | William Leidesdorff | 35,521 acres (14,375 ha) | 359 ND | Folsom | Sacramento |
| San Juan | 1844 | Manuel Micheltorena | Joel P Dedmond | 19,983 acres (8,087 ha) | 324 ND | Sacramento | Sacramento |
| Real de los Aguilas | 1844 | Manuel Micheltorena | Francisco Arias and Saturnino Carriaga | 31,052 acres (12,566 ha) | 262 SD | | San Benito |
| Muscupiabe | 1844 | Manuel Micheltorena | Michael White | 30,145 acres (12,199 ha) | 281 SD | Cajon Pass | San Bernardino |
| Pauma | 1844 | Manuel Micheltorena | Jose Antonio Serrano | 13,309 acres (5,386 ha) | 189 SD | | San Diego |
| San Jose del Valle | 1844 | Manuel Micheltorena | Juan José Warner | 26,689 acres (10,801 ha) | 218 SD | Warner Springs | San Diego |
| Santa Ysabel | 1844 | Manuel Micheltorena | José Joaquin Ortega and Edward Stokes | 17,719 acres (7,171 ha) | 191 SD | Julian | San Diego |
| Campo de los Franceses | 1844 | Manuel Micheltorena | William Gulnac | 48,747 acres (19,727 ha) | 298 ND | Stockton, French Camp | San Joaquin |
| Sanjon de los Moquelumnes | 1844 | Manuel Micheltorena | Anastasio and María Chaboya | 35,508 acres (14,370 ha) | 93 ND, 406 ND | Galt | San Joaquin |
| Cholame | 1844 | Manuel Micheltorena | Mauricio Gonzales | 26,622 acres (10,774 ha) | 71 SD | | San Luis Obispo |
| Santa Ysabel | 1844 | Manuel Micheltorena | Francisco Arce | 17,719 acres (7,171 ha) | 42 SD | | San Luis Obispo |
| Laguna (Alemany) | 1844 | Manuel Micheltorena | Francisco García Diego y Moreno | 4,157.02 acres (1,682 ha) | 609, 425, N. D., and 388 S. D. | San Luis Obispo, California | San Luis Obispo |
| Paso de Robles | 1844 | Manuel Micheltorena | Pedro Narváez | 25,993 acres (10,519 ha) | 351 SD | Paso Robles | San Luis Obispo |
| Feliz | 1844 | Manuel Micheltorena | Domingo Feliz | 4,448 acres (1,800 ha) | 148 ND | Millbrae | San Mateo |
| Cañada de Salsipuedes | 1844 | Manuel Micheltorena | Pedro Cordero | 6,656 acres (2,694 ha) | 2 SD | | Santa Barbara |
| Punta de Laguna | 1844 | Manuel Micheltorena | Luis Arelanes and E M Ortega | 26,648 acres (10,784 ha) | 188 SD | Los Alamos | Santa Barbara |
| Lomas de la Purificacion | 1844 | Manuel Micheltorena | Agustin Janssens | 13,341 acres (5,399 ha) | 115 SD | | Santa Barbara |
| Los Coches | 1844 | Manuel Micheltorena | Roberto Sunol | 2,219 acres (898 ha) | 289 ND | San Jose | Santa Clara |
| Corte de Madera | 1844 | Manuel Micheltorena | Maximo Martinez | 13,316 acres (5,389 ha) | 36 ND | Ladera | Santa Clara |
| San Juan Bautista | 1844 | Manuel Micheltorena | Jose Narvaez | 8,879 acres (3,593 ha) | 7 ND | Willow Glen | Santa Clara |
| Posolmi | 1844 | Manuel Micheltorena | Lope Yñigo | 1,696 acres (686 ha) | 410 ND | Mountain View, Sunnyvale | Santa Clara |
| Potrero de Santa Clara | 1844 | Manuel Micheltorena | James Alexander Forbes | 1,939 acres (785 ha) | 77 ND | San Jose | Santa Clara |
| Tres Ojos de Agua | 1844 | Manuel Micheltorena | Nicolas Dodero | 176 acres (71 ha) | 285 SD | Santa Cruz | Santa Cruz |
| Los Corralitos | 1844 | Manuel Micheltorena | Jose Amesti | 15,440 acres (6,248 ha) | 175 SD, 398 SD, 399 SD | Corralitos | Santa Cruz |
| Buena Ventura | 1844 | Manuel Micheltorena | Pierson B. Reading | 26,632 acres (10,778 ha) | 4 ND | Redding | Shasta |
| Los Ulpinos | 1844 | Manuel Micheltorena | John Bidwell | 17,726 acres (7,173 ha) | 86 ND | | Solano |
| Bodega | 1844 | Manuel Micheltorena | Stephen Smith | 35,487 acres (14,361 ha) | 35 ND | Bodega Bay | Sonoma |
| Cañada de Pogolimi | 1844 | Manuel Micheltorena | James Dawson | 8,781 acres (3,554 ha) | 44 ND | Bloomfield | Sonoma |
| Caslamayomi | 1844 | Manuel Micheltorena | Eugenio Montenegro | 26,788 acres (10,841 ha) | 186 ND | Healdsburg | Sonoma |
| Cotate | 1844 | Manuel Micheltorena | Juan Casteneda | 17,238 acres (6,976 ha) | 156 ND | Cotati, Rohnert Park, Penngrove | Sonoma |
| Llano de Santa Rosa | 1844 | Manuel Micheltorena | Joaquin Carrillo | 13,360 acres (5,407 ha) | 58 ND | Santa Rosa | Sonoma |
| Sotoyome | 1844 | Manuel Micheltorena | Henry D. Fitch | 48,836 acres (19,763 ha) | 52 ND | Healdsburg | Sonoma |
| Rancho Orestimba y Las Garzas | 1844 | Manuel Micheltorena | Sebastian Nunez | 26,666 acres (10,791 ha) | 57 ND | Newman | Stanislaus |
| Del Puerto | 1844 | Manuel Micheltorena | Mariano and Pedro Hernández | 13,340 acres (5,399 ha) | 330 ND | Patterson | Stanislaus |
| Boga | 1844 | Manuel Micheltorena | Charles W. Flugge | 22,185 acres (8,978 ha) | 358 ND | Live Oak | Sutter |
| Barranca Colorado | 1844 | Manuel Micheltorena | Josiah Belden | 17,707 acres (7,166 ha) | 185 ND | Red Bluff | Tehama |
| Bosquejo | 1844 | Manuel Micheltorena | Peter Lassen | 22,206 acres (8,986 ha) | 367 ND | Vina | Tehama |
| Capay | 1844 | Manuel Micheltorena | Maria Josefa Soto | 44,388 acres (17,963 ha) | 42 ND, 288 ND | Hamilton City | Tehama |
| Las Flores | 1844 | Manuel Micheltorena | William Chard | 13,316 acres (5,389 ha) | 150 ND | Gerber-Las Flores | Tehama |
| Primer Cañon o Rio de Los Berrendos | 1844 | Manuel Micheltorena | Job Francis Dye | 26,637 acres (10,780 ha) | 12 ND | | Tehama |
| Rio de los Molinos | 1844 | Manuel Micheltorena | Albert Toomes | 22,172 acres (8,973 ha) | 106 ND | Los Molinos | Tehama |
| Saucos | 1844 | Manuel Micheltorena | Robert Thomes | 22,212 acres (8,989 ha) | 85 ND | Tehama | Tehama |
| Nueva Flandria | 1844 | Manuel Micheltorena | John Schwartz | | 273 ND | West Sacramento | Yolo |
| Jimeno | 1844 | Manuel Micheltorena | Manuel Jimeno | 48,854 acres (19,771 ha) | 23 ND | | Yolo |
| Johnson | 1844 | Manuel Micheltorena | Pablo Gutierrez | 22,197 acres (8,983 ha) | 397 ND | Wheatland | Yuba |
| Honcut | 1844 | Manuel Micheltorena | Theodor Cordua | 31,080 acres (12,578 ha) | 51 ND, 301 ND | Honcut | Yuba |
| Cañada de los Nogales | 1844 | Manuel Micheltorena | Jose Maria Aguilar | 2,000 acres (809 ha) | 23 SD | Mt. Washington, Highland Park | Los Angeles |
| Llano Seco | 1845 | Pio Pico | Sebastian Kayser | 17,767 acres (7,190 ha) | 398 ND | Rancho Llano Seco | Butte |
| Colus | 1845 | Pio Pico | John Bidwell | 8,876 acres (3,592 ha) | 28 ND | Colusa | Colusa |
| Guenoc | 1845 | Pio Pico | George Rock | 21,220 acres (8,587 ha) | 13 ND | Guenoc | Lake |
| Potrero de Felipe Lugo | 1845 | Pio Pico | Teodoro Romero and Jorge Morillo | 2,043 acres (827 ha) | 33 SD | South El Monte | Los Angeles |
| Potrero Grande | 1845 | Pio Pico | Manuel Antonio | 4,432 acres (1,794 ha) | 243 SD | Rosemead | Los Angeles |
| Santa Anita | 1845 | Pio Pico | Hugo Reid | 13,319 acres (5,390 ha) | 86 SD | Arcadia | Los Angeles |
| El Escorpión | 1845 | Pio Pico | Odon Eusebia, Urbano, and Manual | 1,110 acres (449 ha) | 129 SD | West Hills | Los Angeles |
| Los Encinos | 1845 | Pio Pico | Ramon, Francisco and Roque | 4,461 acres (1,805 ha) | 392 SD | Encino | Los Angeles |
| San Francisquito | 1845 | Pio Pico | Henry Dalton | 8,894 acres (3,599 ha) | 22 SD | Temple City | Los Angeles |
| Laguna de San Antonio | 1845 | Pio Pico | Bartoleme Bojorquez | 24,903 acres (10,078 ha) | 61 ND | | Marin |
| Yokaya | 1845 | Pio Pico | Cayetano Juarez | 35,541 acres (14,383 ha) | 217 ND | Ukiah | Mendocino |
| Pleyto | 1845 | Pio Pico | Jose Antonio Chaves | 13,299 acres (5,382 ha) | 288 SD | Pleyto | Monterey |
| Ex-Mission Soledad | 1845 | Pio Pico | Feliciano Soberanes | 8,900 acres (3,602 ha) | 348 SD | | Monterey |
| Misión Vieja | 1845 | Pio Pico | John (Don Juan) Forster | 46,432 acres (18,790 ha) | 250 SD | Mission Viejo, San Juan Capistrano | Orange |
| Potrero los Pinos | 1845 | Pio Pico | John (Don Juan) Forster | 523 acres (212 ha) | 337 SD | Cleveland National Forest | Orange |
| Little Temecula | 1845 | Pio Pico | Pablo Apis | 2,233 acres (904 ha) | 55 SD | Temecula | Riverside |
| Potreros de San Juan Capistrano | 1845 | Pio Pico | John (Don Juan) Forster | 1,168 acres (473 ha) | 337 SD | Cleveland National Forest | Riverside |
| Buena Vista | 1845 | Pio Pico | Felipe | 2,288 acres (926 ha) | 166 SD | Vista | San Diego |
| El Cajon | 1845 | Pio Pico | Maria Estudillo | 48,800 acres (19,749 ha) | 114 SD | El Cajon | San Diego |
| Cuca | 1845 | Pio Pico | Maria Juana de Los Angeles | 2,174 acres (880 ha) | 251 SD | | San Diego |
| Cuyamaca | 1845 | Pio Pico | Agustin Olvera | 35,501 acres (14,367 ha) | 124 SD | | San Diego |
| Guajome | 1845 | Pío Pico | Andres and Jose Manuel | 2,219 acres (898 ha) | 145 SD | Vista | San Diego |
| Guejito y Cañada de Paloma | 1845 | Pio Pico | Jose Maria Orozco | 13,299 acres (5,382 ha) | 84 SD | Escondido | San Diego |
| de la Nación | 1845 | Pío Pico | John (Don Juan) Forster | 26,632 acres (10,778 ha) | 246 SD | National City | San Diego |
| San Dieguito | 1845 | Pío Pico | Juan María Osuna | 8,824 acres (3,571 ha) | 92 SD | Rancho Santa Fe | San Diego |
| San Miguel | 1845 | Pio Pico | José de Jesús Noé | 4,443 acres (1,798 ha) | 6 ND | San Francisco | San Francisco |
| El Chorro | 1845 | Pio Pico | John Wilson and James Scott | 3,167 acres (1,282 ha) | 25 SD | San Luis Obispo | San Luis Obispo |
| Asuncion | 1845 | Pio Pico | Pedro Estrada and Francisco Urbano Estrada | 39,225 acres (15,874 ha) | 76 SD | Atascadero | San Luis Obispo |
| Cañada de los Osos y Pecho y Islay | 1845 | Pio Pico | James Scott and John Wilson | 32,431 acres (13,124 ha) | 28 SD, 218 SD | Irish Hills, Los Osos Valley, Montaña de Oro State Park, Diablo Canyon Power Plant | San Luis Obispo |
| Corral de Cuati | 1845 | Pio Pico | Agustin Davila | 13,322 acres (5,391 ha) | 49 SD | Los Olivos | Santa Barbara |
| Ex-Mission la Purisima | 1845 | Pio Pico | Jonathan Temple | 14,750 acres (5,969 ha) | 389 SD | Los Berros | Santa Barbara |
| La Laguna | 1845 | Pio Pico | Octaviano Gutierrez | 48,704 acres (19,710 ha) | 21 SD | Santa Ynez | Santa Barbara |
| Mission Vieja de la Purisma | 1845 | Pio Pico | Joaquín Carrillo and José Antonio Carrillo | 4,414 acres (1,786 ha) | 61 SD | Lompoc | Santa Barbara |
| San Carlos de Jonata | 1845 | Pio Pico | Joaquín Carrillo and Jose Maria Covarrubias | 26,634 acres (10,778 ha) | 156 SD | | Santa Barbara |
| Santa Rita | 1845 | Pio Pico | José Ramón Malo | 13,316 acres (5,389 ha) | 219 SD | | Santa Barbara |
| Sisquoc | 1845 | Pio Pico | María Dominguez de Caballero | 35,486 acres (14,361 ha) | 310 SD | | Santa Barbara |
| Tequepis | 1845 | Pio Pico | Joaquin Villa | 8,919 acres (3,609 ha) | 64 SD | | Santa Barbara |
| Ulistac | 1845 | Pio Pico | Marcelo, Pio and Cristoval | 2,217 acres (897 ha) | 323 ND | Santa Clara | Santa Clara |
| Cañada de Jonive | 1845 | Pio Pico | James Black | 10,786 acres (4,365 ha) | 48 ND | Freestone | Sonoma |
| Muniz | 1845 | Pio Pico | Manuel Torres | 17,761 acres (7,188 ha) | 95 ND | Fort Ross | Sonoma |
| Roblar de la Miseria | 1845 | Pio Pico | Juan Nepomuceno Padilla | 16,887 acres (6,834 ha) | 30 ND | Roblar, Two Rock | Sonoma |
| Fernandez | 1846 | Pio Pico | Dionisio Fernandez | 17,806 acres (7,206 ha) | 377 ND | | Butte |
| Laguna de Tache | 1846 | Pio Pico | Manuel Castro | 48,801 acres (19,749 ha) | 255 SD, 267 SD | Laton | Fresno |
| Los Alamos y Agua Caliente | 1846 | Pio Pico | Lopez, Jordan, Botiller | 26,626 acres (10,775 ha) | 183 SD | | Kern |
| La Liebre | 1846 | Pio Pico | Jose Maria Flores | 48,800 acres (19,749 ha) | 170 SD | | Kern |
| Ex-Mission San Fernando | 1846 | Pio Pico | Eulogio de Celis | 116,858 acres (47,291 ha) | 343 SD | San Fernando Valley | Los Angeles |
| Santa Catalina Island | 1846 | Pío Pico | Thomas M. Robbins | 45,820 acres (18,543 ha) | 368 SD | Santa Catalina Island | Los Angeles |
| Las Baulines | 1846 | Pio Pico | Gregorio Briones | 8,911 acres (3,606 ha) | 189 ND, 174 SD | Bolinas | Marin |
| Bolsa de Tomales | 1846 | Pio Pico | Juan Nepomuceno Padilla | | 121 ND | | Marin |
| Boca de la Playa | 1846 | Pio Pico | Emigdio Vejar | 6,607 acres (2,674 ha) | 146 SD | San Clemente, Dana Point | Orange |
| Lomas de Santiago | 1846 | Pio Pico | Teodosio Yorba | 47,226 acres (19,112 ha) | 186 SD | Irvine | Orange |
| Trabuco | 1846 | Pio Pico | John (Don Juan) Forster | 22,184 acres (8,978 ha) | 216 SD | Trabuco Canyon, Coto de Caza | Orange |
| Chimiles | 1846 | Pio Pico | Jose Ygnacio Berreyesa | 17,762 acres (7,188 ha) | 43 ND | Napa | Napa |
| San Jacinto Sobrante | 1846 | Pio Pico | Maria Rosario Estudillo | 48,847 acres (19,768 ha) | 80 SD | Lake Mathews | Riverside |
| La Sierra | 1846 | Pio Pico | Vincenta Sepulveda | 17,774 acres (7,193 ha) | 362 SD | Norco, Riverside | Riverside |
| La Sierra | 1846 | Pio Pico | Bernardo Yorba | 17,769 acres (7,191 ha) | 126 SD | Corona | Riverside |
| Santa Rosa | 1846 | Pio Pico | Juan Moreno | 47,815 acres (19,350 ha) | 148 SD | Temecula, Murrieta | Riverside |
| San Jacinto Nuevo y Potrero | 1846 | Pio Pico | Miguel Pedrorena | 48,861 acres (19,773 ha) | 82 SD | Moreno Valley | Riverside |
| San Lorenzo | 1846 | Pio Pico | Rafael Sanchez | 48,286 acres (19,541 ha) | 277 SD | | San Benito |
| Cañada de San Vicente y Mesa del Padre Barona | 1846 | Pio Pico | Juan Bautisa Lopez | 13,316 acres (5,389 ha) | 162 SD | Ramona | San Diego |
| Valle de San Felipe | 1846 | Pio Pico | Felipe Castillo | 9,972 acres (4,036 ha) | 329 SD | | San Diego |
| Monserate | 1846 | Pio Pico | Ysidro Alvarado | 13,322 acres (5,391 ha) | 224 SD | Fallbrook | San Diego |
| Ex-Mission San Diego | 1846 | Pio Pico | Santiago Argüello | 58,875 acres (23,826 ha) | 347 SD | San Diego | San Diego |
| San Diego Island | 1846 | Pío Pico | Pedro C. Carrillo | 4,185 acres (1,694 ha) | 257 SD | Coronado | San Diego |
| San Mateo | 1846 | Pio Pico | Cayetano Arenas | 6,439 acres (2,606 ha) | 178 ND, 409 ND | Hillsborough | San Mateo |
| Cuyama | 1846 | Pio Pico | Cesario Lataillade | 48,827 acres (19,760 ha) | 104 SD | Cuyama | Santa Barbara |
| La Goleta | 1846 | Pio Pico | Daniel A. Hill | 4,426 acres (1,791 ha) | 252 SD | Goleta | Santa Barbara |
| San Marcos | 1846 | Pio Pico | Nicolas A. Den and Richard S. Den | 35,573 acres (14,396 ha) | 364 SD | | Santa Barbara |
| Los Huecos | 1846 | Pio Pico | Luis Arenas and John A. Rowland | 39,951 acres (16,168 ha) | 221 ND | | Santa Clara |
| Cañada del Rincon en el Rio San Lorenzo | 1846 | Pío Pico | Pedro Sainsevain | 5,827 acres (2,358 ha) | 90 ND, 391 SD | Henry Cowell Redwoods State Park | Santa Cruz |
| San Vicente | 1846 | Pío Pico | Blas A. Escamilla | 10,803 acres (4,372 ha) | 280 SD, 332 ND | Davenport | Santa Cruz |
| Rincon de Musalacon | 1846 | Pio Pico | Francisco Berryessa | 8,867 acres (3,588 ha) | 222 ND | Cloverdale | Sonoma |
| German | 1846 | Pio Pico | Ernest Rufus | 17,580 acres (7,114 ha) | 15 ND | Gualala | Sonoma |
| Thompson | 1846 | Pio Pico | Alpheus Basil Thompson | 35,533 acres (14,380 ha) | 351 ND | Oakdale | Stanislaus |
| Ex-Mission San Buenaventura | 1846 | Pio Pico | José de Arnaz | 48,823 acres (19,758 ha) | 318 SD | Ventura | Ventura |
| Cañada de San Miguelito | 1846 | Pio Pico | Ramon Rodriguez | 8,877 acres (3,592 ha) | 57 SD | Ventura | Ventura |
| Cañada de Capay | 1846 | Pio Pico | Francisco Berryessa | 40,079 acres (16,219 ha) | 382 ND | Madison, Capay | Yolo |
| Ex-Mission San José | 1846 | Pio Pico | Andrés Pico and Juan B. Alvarado | 30,000 acres (12,141 ha) | 407 ND | Fremont | Alameda |
| San Juan Capistrano del Camote | 1846 | Pio Pico | Tomás Herrera, Geronimo Quintana | 44,280 acres (17,919 ha) | 577 SD | San Juan Ranch | San Luis Obispo |

== See also ==
- Ranchos of California
  - Ranchos of Los Angeles County
  - Ranchos of Orange County
- Mexican land grants in Texas
- List of California Rancherias
- Las Californias topics – Spanish + Mexican California.
- 18th century in The Californias
- 19th century in California
