= Rancho Soulajule =

Mexican land grant in California

Coordinates: 38.160°N 122.780°W

Rancho Soulajule was a 10,898-acre (44.10 km^{2}) Mexican land grant in present day Marin County, California given in 1844 by Governor Manuel Micheltorena to José Ramón Mesa. The grant extended along Walker Creek. The southern boundary was defined as Rancho Corte Madera de Novato.

== History ==
From 1834 to 1842, Ramón Mesa (1816 - 1885) was soldier at the San Francisco Presidio, and was granted three square league Rancho Soulajulle in 1844.

In 1849, Mesa sold 2,366 acres (9.6 km^{2})of the rancho to Lewis D. Watkins and George N. Cornwell. In 1850, Mesa sold the rest of the rancho: 2,266 acres (9.2 km^{2}) to Martin F. Gomley, and 6,266 acres (25.4 km^{2}) to William M. Fuller. Fuller sold his land to Joshua J. Brackett and Pedro J. Vasquez. Pedro José Vasquez was a brother of José Tiburcio Vasquez, grantee of Rancho Corral de Tierra.

With the cession of California to the United States following the Mexican-American War, the 1848 Treaty of Guadalupe Hidalgo provided that the land grants would be honored. As required by the Land Act of 1851, five claims for Rancho Soulajule were filed with the Public Land Commission in 1852 and the grant was patented in 1879.

| Land Case No. | Claimant | Patented area | Note |
|---|---|---|---|
| 328 ND | George N. Cornwell | 919 acres (3.7 km^{2}) | |
| 329 ND | Joshua S.Brackett | 2,492 acres (10.1 km^{2}) | |
| 331 ND | Pedro J.Vasquez | 3,774 acres (15.3 km^{2}) | |
| 334 ND | Martin F.Gormley | 2,266 acres (9.2 km^{2}) | |
| 352 ND | Louisa D. Watkins | 1,447 acres (5.9 km^{2}) | |
| 336 ND | William M. Fuller | | rejected |

Although Mesa had sold all of the rancho, in 1855 he sold to Walter Skidmore, an area of land that Mesa considered to be a part of the grant, but which was not confirmed by the Land Commission. The US Supreme Court ruled he did not own this land.

== See also ==
- Ranchos of California
- List of Ranchos of California
