= Rancho San Lorenzo =

Rancho San Lorenzo may refer to these Mexican land grants in California:

- Rancho San Lorenzo (Castro), 1841, in Hayward, San Lorenzo, and Castro Valley
- Rancho San Lorenzo (Randall), 1842, in Monterey County
- Rancho San Lorenzo (Sanchez), 1846, in San Benito and Monterey Counties
- Rancho San Lorenzo (Soberanes), 1841, in Salinas Valley, Monterey County
