= Rancho Ciénega de los Paicines =

Mexican land grant in California

Coordinates: 36.720°N 121.300°W

Rancho Ciénega de los Paicines (Spanish pronunciation: [/ˈranʧo θjeneɣa ðe los pajˈθines/] RAN-cho SYEH-neh-gah deh lohs py-SEE-nehs) was a 8,918-acre (36.09 km^{2}) Mexican land grant and present-day ranch in present day San Benito County, California given in 1842 by Governor Juan B. Alvarado to Ángel María Castro and José Antonio Rodríguez. The Spanish name means "marsh lands of the Paicines.". The grant extended along the San Benito River with Tres Pinos Creek on the east and the Cienega Valley on the west, and encompassed present day Paicines.

== History ==
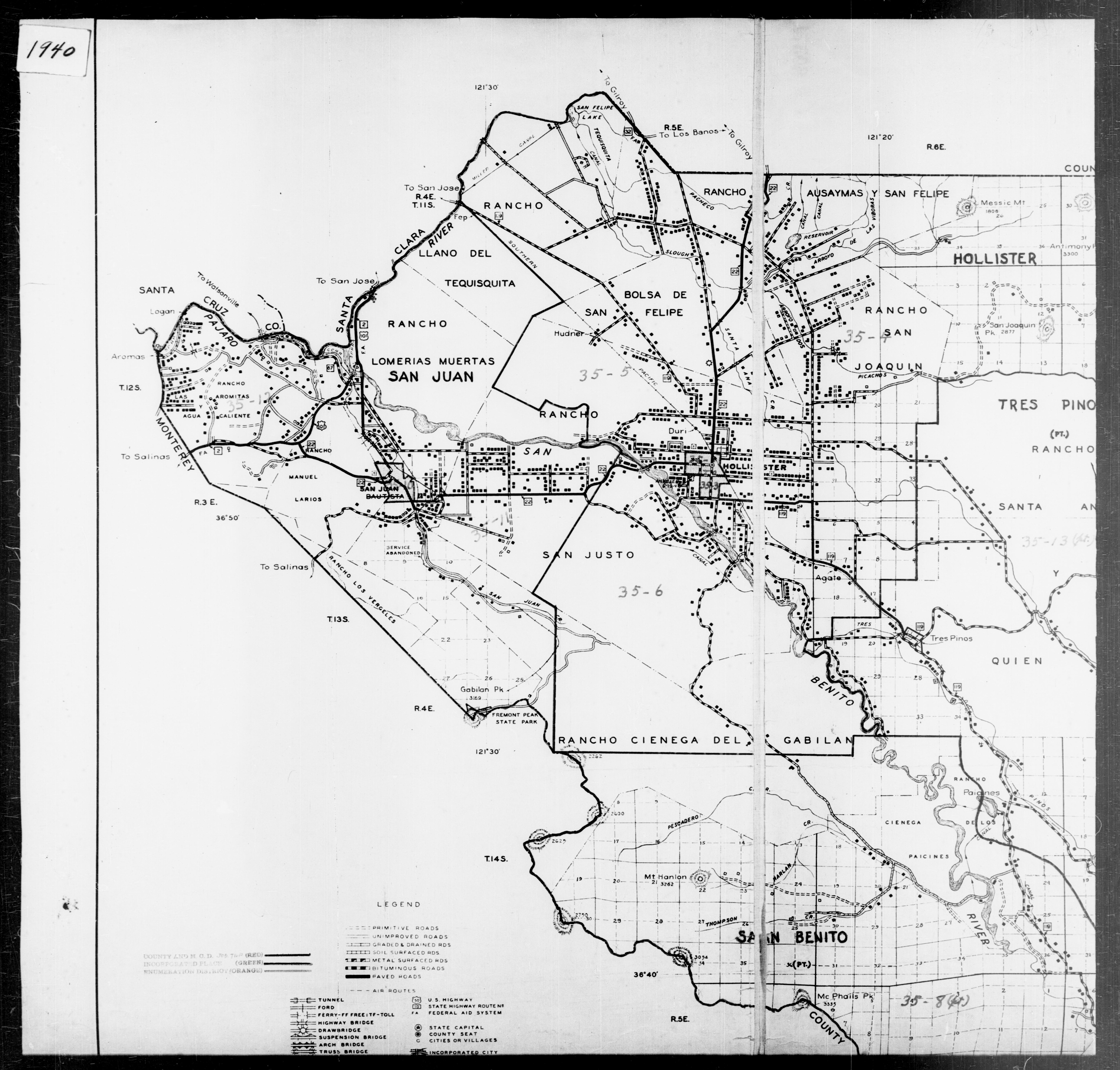
Rancho is visitble in this 1940's map

The two square league Rancho Ciénega de los Paicines grant was given to Angel María Castro and his son-in-law José Antonio Rodriguez. Angel María Dolores Castro (1794–??), son of Josef Macario Castro, was a soldier at San Jose and Branciforte and married María Ysabel Butron (daughter of Manuel Josef Butron and Maria Ygnacia Emigdia Higuera)(1796–1848) in 1812. José Antonio Rodriguez (–1853), son of Sebastian Rodriguez (grantee of Rancho Bolsa del Pajaro) and Maria Pacheco, was a guard at Mission San Miguel and married Hilaria (Elisaria) Castro (1817–), the daughter of Angel Delores Castro and Maria Ysabel Butron 1835.

With the cession of California to the United States following the Mexican-American War, the 1848 Treaty of Guadalupe Hidalgo provided that the land grants would be honored. As required by the Land Act of 1851, a claim for Rancho Ciénega de los Paicines was filed with the Public Land Commission in 1853, and the grant was patented to Ángel María Castro and José Antonio Rodríguez in 1869.

In 1867 Francisco Villegas sold the rancho to Alexander B. Grogan (-1886), a San Francisco land speculator and financier. Grogan had been Faxon Atherton's California business agent and later the executor of Atherton's estate. At one time nearby Paicines was named Groganville. In 1906, the ranch was purchased by A. Kingsley Macomber. Walter Murphy, a Chicago businessman owned the ranch from 1927 to his death in 1943. Bob and Katherine Law owned the ranch from 1943 to 1989. The Ridgemark Corporation bought the ranch in 1989 and attempted to develop it. Sallie Calhoun and Matt Christiano, formerly of Globetrotter Software, acquired the ranch in 2001. It remains a working ranch.

== See also ==
- Ranchos of California
- List of Ranchos of California
