= Rancho San Bernardo (Canet) =

Land grant in California

Coordinates: 35.390°N 120.820°W

Rancho San Bernardo was a 4,379-acre (17.72 km^{2}) Mexican land grant, in present-day San Luis Obispo County, California, given in 1840 by Governor Juan B. Alvarado to Vicente Canet.

The grant extended along Little Morro Creek and San Bernardo Creek east of Morro Bay.

== History ==
Vicente (Cane) Canet (1790–1858) came to Monterey in 1825. In 1828 he married Rosa Maria Josefa Butrón (1812–1890), daughter of Manuel José Butrón and María Ignacia Rita Higuera of Rancho La Natividad. Canet was at the Presidio of Monterey for twelve years, and in 1840 was administrator of Mission San Luis Obispo. In 1840 he was granted the one square league Rancho San Bernardo.

With the cession of California to the United States following the Mexican-American War, the 1848 Treaty of Guadalupe Hidalgo provided that the land grants would be honored. As required by the Land Act of 1851, a claim for Rancho San Bernardo was filed with the Public Land Commission in 1852, and the grant was patented to Vicente Canet in 1865.

After the death of Vicente Canet in 1858, Rosa Maria Josefa Butrón married John Simmler in 1859. John Jacob Simmler, who came to California in 1853, opened the first hotel at San Luis Obispo. In 1874, the Canet family sold Rancho San Bernardo to Francisco Estevan Quintana (1809–1880). After visiting Alta California in 1839 and 1841, Quintana bought a ranch near in the vicinity of Paso Robles. In 1843 he left with a party from New Mexico with his family and livestock, traveling over the Old Spanish Trail to the San Bernardino Valley, then on to San Luis Obispo in 1844. There he served as alcalde of San Luis Obispo in 1845 and 1849. He had purchased Rancho Potrero de San Luis Obispo from Maria Concepcion "Chona" Boronda in 1854.

In 1880, Estevan's second eldest son, Pedro de Jesus Quintana, inherited two thirds of the Rancho San Bernardo, provided he pay Jose Maria Quintana, Estevan's eldest son, $50 per month during his lifetime. The remaining one third was to support his sister, Maria, a Sister of Charity, with the provision she was to give her brother Pedro preference if she wished to sell it.

== Local sites ==
- Millingstone Horizon

== See also ==
- Morro Creek
- Ranchos of San Luis Obispo County, California
- List of Ranchos of California
- Ranchos of California
