= Rancho Corral de Piedra =

Land grant in California

- U.S. National Register of Historic Places
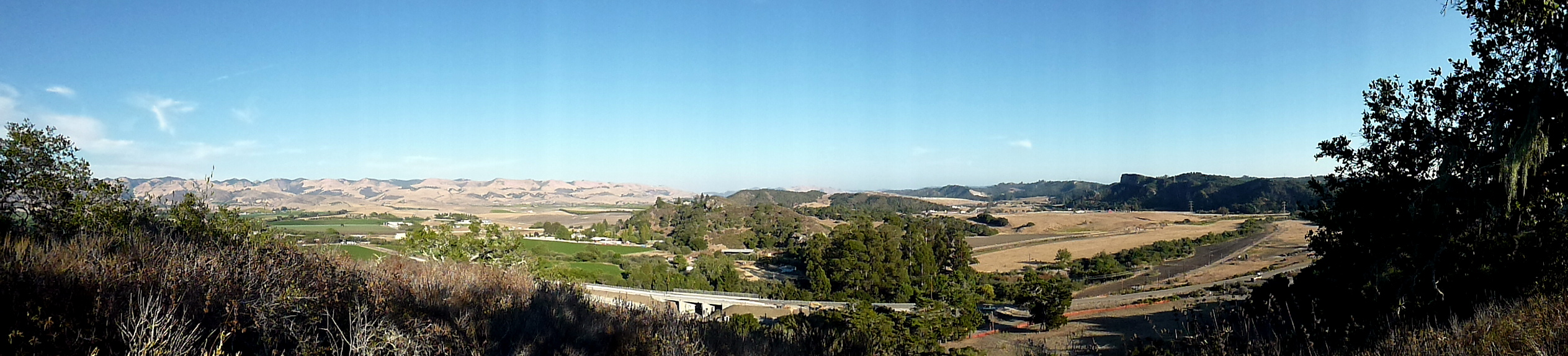
- Corral de Piedra panorama facing southeast

- Location within California
- Nearest city: San Luis Obispo
- Coordinates: 35.200°N 120.570°W
- Area: 30,911-acre (125.09 km^{2})
- Built: 1941–1846
- NRHP reference No.: 78000766
- Added to NRHP: May 22, 1978

Rancho Corral de Piedra was a 30,911-acre (125.09 km^{2}) Mexican land grant in present day San Luis Obispo County, California consisting of two square leagues given in 1841 by Governor Juan B. Alvarado to José María Villavicencio, with an extension of five square leagues given in 1846, by Governor Pio Pico. The grant was located between present day San Luis Obispo and Arroyo Grande, and bounded on the south by Arroyo Grande Creek.

== History ==
José María Teodoro Villavicencio (1800–1853), called for brevity Villa, was the grandson of Rafael de Jesus Villavicencio (a soldier and member of the Portola expedition) and Maria Ildefonsa Berges. José María Villavicencio retired as captain of the militia at Monterey, and was administrator at Mission San Antonio and Mission San Fernando. Villavicencio first married Maria Gertrudis Briones (1802 to 1832) the daughter of Jose Manuel Briones (1774 to 1849) and Maria Raymunda Buelna (1780 to 1808). After Maria Gertrudis death he remarried to Maria Francisca Rafaela Elisabet o Ysabel Rodriguez (1814 to aft.1880?) the daughter of Sebastian Rodríguez grantee of Rancho Bolsa del Pajaro and Maria Perfecta Pacheco. His brother, Rafael Jose Serapio Villavicencio was the grantee of Rancho San Geronimo.

With the cession of California to the United States following the Mexican-American War, the 1848 Treaty of Guadalupe Hidalgo provided that the land grants would be honored. As required by the Land Act of 1851, a claim for Rancho Corral de Piedra was filed with the Public Land Commission in 1852, and the grant was patented to José María Villavicencio in 1867.

When José María Villavicencio died in 1853, he left the rancho to his seven children. In 1860, his widow Rafaela borrowed money from her brother Jacinto Rodriguez. In 1866, Rodríguez convinced the heirs to sell him the entire rancho, which he sold to dairymen George Steele and his brothers Edgar W., Isaac C., and Rensselaer E. Steele. In 1867, the heirs decided that the sale to Rodríguez was not legal, and sold six-sevenths of the rancho to George Alexander.

== See also ==
- Ranchos of California
- List of Ranchos of California
