= Rancho Saucito =

Mexican land grant in California

Coordinates: 36.590°N 121.830°W

Rancho Saucito was a 2,212-acre (8.95 km^{2}) Mexican land grant in present day Monterey County, California given in 1833 by Governor José Figueroa to Graciano Manjares. The grant was located east of Monterey and the present day Monterey Regional Airport, and is bordered on the east by Rancho Laguna Seca.

== History ==
Graciano Manjares (1801-) married Maximiana Gongora and they had five children: Domingo (1829-), Jose (1830-), Ponciano (1831-), Estanislao (1832-), and Juana (1835-). Manjares was granted the one league by half league Rancho Saucito in 1833.

With the cession of California to the United States following the Mexican-American War, the 1848 Treaty of Guadalupe Hidalgo provided that the land grants would be honored. As required by the Land Act of 1851, a claim for Rancho Saucito was filed with the Public Land Commission in 1852, and the grant was patented to John Wilson, Josiah H. Swain, and George C. Harris in 1862.

== See also ==
- Ranchos of California
- List of Ranchos of California
