= Rancho Santa Rosa (Cota) =

Ranch in California, United States

Coordinates: 34.610°N 120.280°W

Rancho Santa Rosa was a 15,526-acre (62.83 km^{2}) Mexican land grant in present day Santa Barbara County, California one and half square leagues given in 1839 by Governor Pro-tem Manuel Jimeno, and two additional square leagues given in 1845 by Governor Pío Pico to Francisco Cota. The grant in the Santa Ynez Valley extended along both banks of the Santa Ynez River at Santa Rosa Creek, west of present day Buellton.

== History ==
Francisco Atanasio Cota (1787–1851) was a soldier at the Presidio of Santa Barbara. In 1811, he married María de Jesus Olivera (1791–1877). He was administrator at Mission Santa Inés 1837-1841.

With the cession of California to the United States following the Mexican-American War, the 1848 Treaty of Guadalupe Hidalgo provided that the land grants would be honored. As required by the Land Act of 1851, a claim for Rancho Santa Rosa was filed with the Public Land Commission in 1852, and the grant was patented to María Jesús Olivera de Cota in 1872.

Joseph W. Cooper bought Rancho Santa Rosa in 1868.

== See also ==
- Ranchos of California
- List of Ranchos of California
