= Rancho Aguajito (Villagrana) =

Mexican land grant in California

Coordinates: 36.984675°N 121.780°W

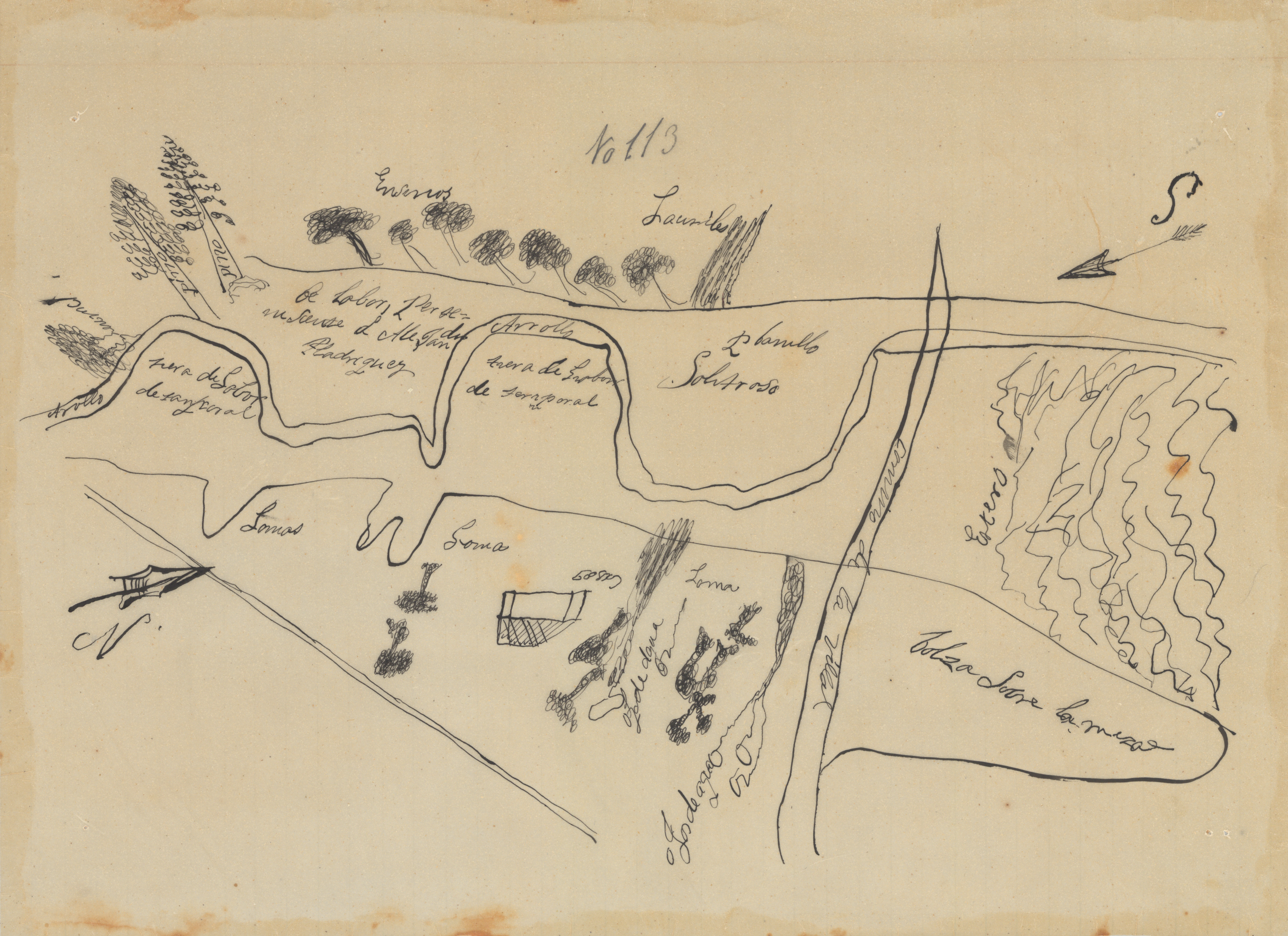
Diseño map submitted for U.S. government patent of Aguajito grant

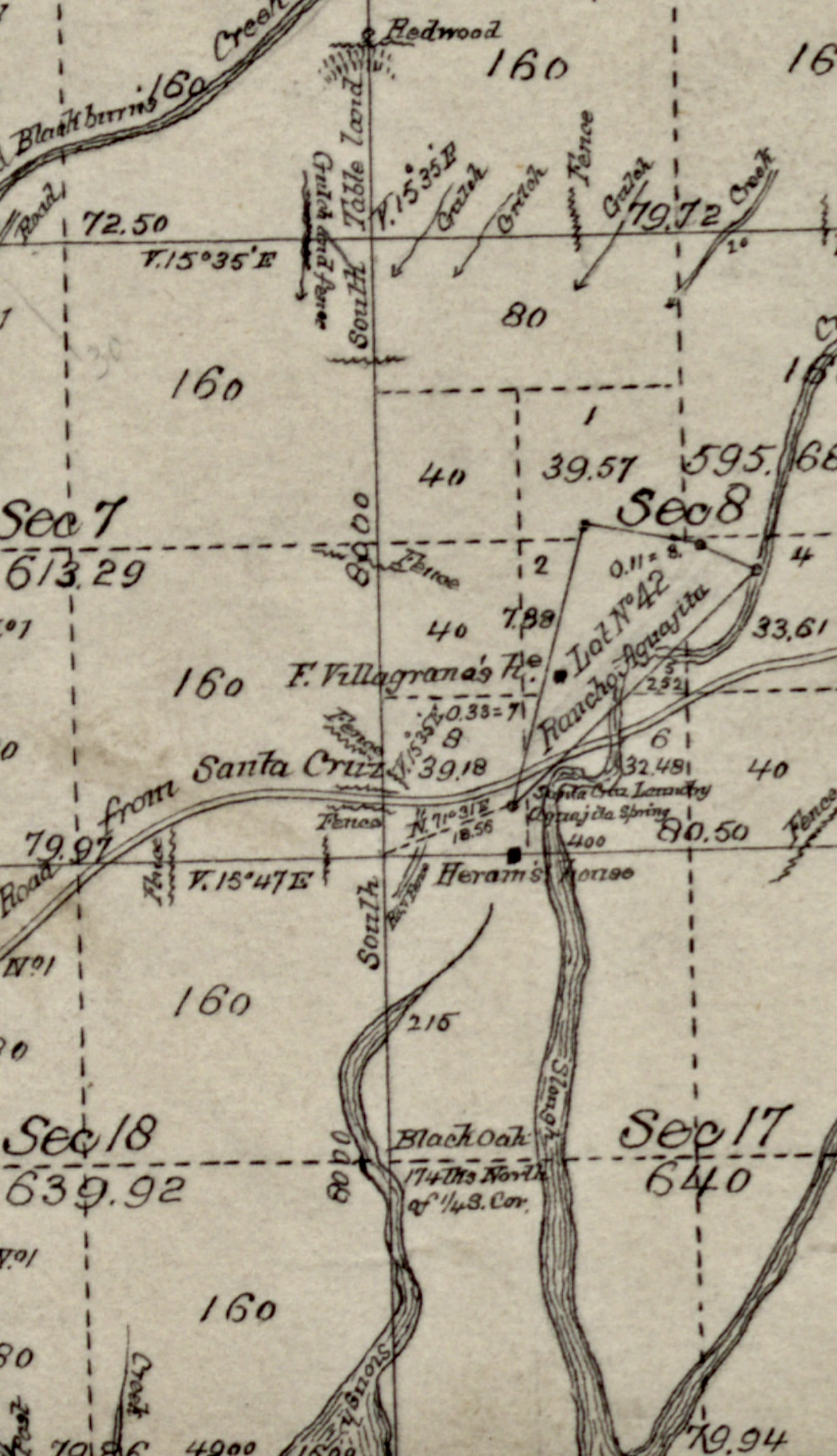
General Land Office survey from 1891, showing wedge shape of grant, nearby houses, Santa Cruz Laundry adjacent to the Aguajito Spring, and extent of the slough

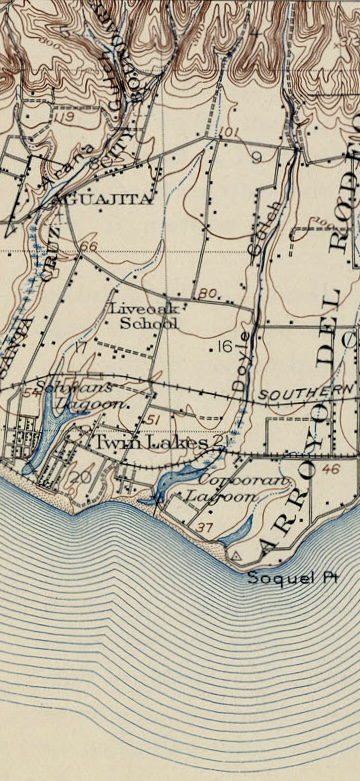
Arana Gulch and Rancho Aguajito on the 1912 USGS map of Capitola quadrangle

Rancho Aguajito (Villagrana) was one of the smallest Mexican land grants, a triangular parcel bordering a creek known as Arana Gulch, measuring 44.32-acre (0.1794 km^{2}) in area. The eastern boundary of the parcel is the creek, which is part of the eastern border of present-day Santa Cruz, California. The grant was given in 1837 by Governor Juan B. Alvarado to Miguel Villagrana.

== History ==
The Rancho Aguajito land may have been first granted to Gregorio Tapia in 1835. Tapia was living on Rancho Pilarcitos in 1836.

Miguel Villagrana came to Alta California in 1828. He was elected to the ayuntamiento (town council), named alcalde (Spanish municipal administrator) and regidor, and appointed juez de campo, "an important office in those days of vast roving herds of cattle and horses." He and his wife Francisca Juarez had 11 children baptized at the Santa Cruz mission church between 1824 and 1848. Villagrana was a resident of the Villa de Branciforte pueblo in 1837, and presumably was already occupying Rancho Aguajito when Governor Alvarado approved the land grant. The grant proper was notably a "small one, only 500 varas, en la arroyito de la villa. It was a bit of fertile land with a spring at the upper end of what is now known as Arana gulch, at the east city limits."

After California became a U.S. state in 1850, a claim for Rancho Aguajito was filed with the Public Land Commission in 1852, and the grant was sent for a patent in 1882. Because there was another land grant with the same name (in Monterey County), the two cases were at first mistakenly lumped together under number 282. To distinguish between the two, "(Villagrana)" is added to this article title.

A Californio named Gregorio Tapia, later known to locals as "Uncle Greg," may have settled on reacquired the tract around 1860, as he lived there from that time until 1886, when he moved to Jolon.

The borders of the Aguajito (Villagrana) grant can still be seen in the Santa Cruz County GIS system mapping. Most of the former land grant is part of the campus of Harbor High School (California).

== See also ==
- List of ranchos of California
