= Rancho San Joaquin (Cervantes) =

Mexican land grant in California

Coordinates: 36.900°N 121.350°W

Rancho San Joaquin (also called "Rosa Morada") was a 7,425-acre (30.05 km^{2}) Mexican land grant in present day San Benito County, California given in 1836 by Governor Nicolás Gutiérrez to Cruz Cervantes. The grant was located north east of present day Hollister and was bounded on the north by Rancho Ausaymas y San Felipe, on the south by Rancho Santa Ana y Quien Sabe, on the west by Santa Ana Creek, and on the east by the hills.

== History ==
Cruz Cervantes (1796–1875) received the two square league Rancho San Joaquin or Rancho Rosa Morada in 1836.

With the cession of California to the United States following the Mexican-American War, the 1848 Treaty of Guadalupe Hidalgo provided that the land grants would be honored. As required by the Land Act of 1851, a claim for Rancho San Joaquin was filed with the Public Land Commission in 1852, and the grant was confirmed by the Commission. It was subsequently rejected by the Northern District Oct. 31, 1853. The United States unsuccessfully appealed to the US Supreme Court. The Supreme Court reversed the decision of the Northern District and remanded the case to the Southern District where it was ultimately confirmed by the Supreme Court May 12, 1856, and the grant was patented to Cruz Cervantes in 1874.

Cruz Cervantes gave a one tenth interest in the Rancho to William Carey Jones (1814–1867) who represented him before the Land Commission. Jones had been appointed by the United States Secretary of the Interior in 1849, to investigate the validity of California's land grants. Cervantes sold to Rancho to Flint, Bixby & Co in 1863.

== See also ==
- Ranchos of California
- List of ranchos of California
