= Rancho Nacional =

Mexican land grant in California

Coordinates: 36.650°N 121.670°W

Rancho Nacional was a 6,633-acre (26.84 km^{2}) Mexican land grant in the Salinas Valley, in present day Monterey County, California given in 1839 by Governor Juan B. Alvarado to Vicente Cantua. The grant was between the Salinas River and present day Salinas.

== History ==
Vicente Cantua (April 5, 1793 in Fresno, California - 1871 in Monterey, Ca) married Juana Soto (Dec 26, 1802 in Carmel, Monterrey, CA - 1841) in Monterey in 1827. He was mayordomo of Rancho El Alisal (Hartnell) in 1836, and administrator of Mission Soledad in 1839. He was granted the two square league Rancho Nacional in 1839. During Spanish rule, the land had been designated as Rancho del Rey San Pedro. The "del Rey" in the name indicated that the land was set aside specifically to provide food for the king's soldiers garrisoned at the nearby Presidio of Monterey. Independent Mexico, having no king, changed the name to Rancho Nacional.

With the cession of California to the United States following the Mexican-American War, the 1848 Treaty of Guadalupe Hidalgo provided that the land grants would be honored. As required by the Land Act of 1851, a claim for Rancho Nacional was filed with the Public Land Commission in 1852, and the grant was patented to Vincente Cantua in 1866.

In 1851, James Bryant Hill came from Boston and leased part of Rancho Salsipuedes. Hill purchased Rancho Nacional, started a settlement known as Hill Town on the Salinas River, and began growing grain. Up until this time, the land had mostly been used to raise cattle. Although he produced record amounts of wheat and barley, Hill ended up losing his holdings.

== See also ==
- Ranchos of California
- List of Ranchos of California
