= Rancho Noche Buena =

Mexican land grant in California

Coordinates: 36.630°N 121.830°W

Rancho Noche Buena was a 4,412-acre (17.85 km^{2}) Mexican land grant in present day Monterey County, California given in 1835 by Governor José Castro to Juan Antonio Muñoz. The name means "Christmas Eve". The grant extended along Monterey Bay northeast of Monterey, and encompassed present day Seaside.

== History ==
The one square league Rancho Noche Buena was granted to Juan Antonio Munoz in 1835. Juan Antonio Munoz (1800-) married Manuela Cruz. Munoz was a Captain in the Mexican army at Monterey. He was exiled with Nicolás Gutiérrez in 1836.

With the cession of California to the United States following the Mexican-American War, the 1848 Treaty of Guadalupe Hidalgo provided that the land grants would be honored. As required by the Land Act of 1851, a claim for Rancho Noche Buena was filed with the Public Land Commission in 1853, and the grant was patented to José and Jaime de Puig Monmany in 1862.

José and Jaime de Puig Monmany received five sixths of the grant and José Munoz (an heir) one sixth.

== See also ==
- Ranchos of California
- List of Ranchos of California
