= Rancho Nueva Flandria =

Mexican land grant in California

Coordinates: 38.570°N 121.620°W

Rancho Nueva Flandria was a Mexican land grant in present-day Yolo County, California given in 1844 by Governor Manuel Micheltorena to Jan Lows de Swart (John Schwartz). The name means "New Flanders" in honor of Swart's native country. The grant extended along the west bank of the Sacramento River, from present-day Bryte south to Merritt Island, and encompassed present-day West Sacramento. The land claim was rejected as fraudulent in 1857.

== History ==
Jan Lows de Swart (1849), born in Flanders, arrived at Sutter's Fort with the Bartleson-Bidwell Party in 1841. Swart, who came to be known as John Schwartz, was granted three square leagues - an area of land one mile wide and twenty miles long. Shortly after settling there, Jan, with the help of his brother George Swart, established a salmon fishery along the Sacramento River. They also engaged in raising livestock and cultivating vegetables.

In 1846, James McDowell bought 600 acres (2.4 km^{2}) of Rancho Nueva Flandria from Jan Swart. In May 1849, James McDowell was shot and killed in a barroom brawl. William W. Warner bought 4,333 acres (17.5 km^{2}). Jan Swart died in 1849 and his brother George Swart eventually lost title to Rancho Nueva Flandria.

With the cession of California to the United States following the Mexican-American War, the 1848 Treaty of Guadalupe Hidalgo provided that the land grants would be honored. As required by the Land Act of 1851, a claim for three square leagues was filed by George Swat, brother and heir, with the Public Land Commission in 1853 and was rejected. A claim for part of Rancho Nueva Flandria filed by W. W. Warner with the Land Commission in 1853 and was rejected.
