= Rancho Tres Ojos de Agua =

19th-Century Mexican land grant

Coordinates: 36.980°N 122.040°W

Rancho Tres Ojos de Agua was a 176-acre (0.71 km^{2}) Mexican land grant in present day Santa Cruz County, California given in 1844 by Governor Manuel Micheltorena to Nicolás Dodero. The name translates literally as "three eyes of water" (springs). The grant was located on both sides of present-day High Street around its intersection with Spring Street, in Santa Cruz.

== History ==
Nicolas Dodero (1804-1866) was an Italian sailor who left the Maria Ester at San Francisco in 1827. He was living in the Pueblo of San José in 1829, and married Josefa Patricia Higuera (1810-1883) at Mission Santa Clara in 1832. Naturalized at the Villa de Branciforte in 1840, Dodero was granted the 1,300 varas square Rancho Tres Ojos de Agua in 1844. There he built a Grist mill on the creek formed by three springs from limestone formations on the hill above. Below the mill, the perennial creeks from these springs were the original water supply for Mission Santa Cruz, via a mile-long zanja (in-ground aqueduct). In the 1850s, after the aqueduct passed the mission plaza, it was captured by a reservoir that fed the first Santa Cruz city water supply system. Dodero died in 1866; he and his wife are buried at Holy Cross cemetery in Santa Cruz.

With the cession of California to the United States following the Mexican-American War, the 1848 Treaty of Guadalupe Hidalgo provided that the land grants would be honored. As required by the Land Act of 1851, a claim for Rancho Santa Cruz was filed with the Public Land Commission in 1853, and the grant was patented to Nicolas Dodero in 1866.

The land passed into the hands to Nelson Alvin Bixby (1829–1904) who came overland and arrived in the Santa Cruz area in 1859. Bixby sold it to Henry Meyrick in 1877. Henry Meyrick built the Hotel Del Monte in Monterey. In 1906, Charles C. Moore bought the property. Charles Caldwell Moore (1868–1932) was a prominent San Franciscan businessman who was the president of the Panama–Pacific International Exposition in San Francisco in 1915.

The springs remain today; the most visible one feeds Westlake, where there's a city park.
