= Rancho Guejito =

Mexican land grant in California

Coordinates: 33.160°N 116.900°W

Rancho Guejito (Spanish pronunciation: [/ˈranʧo ɣeˈxito/] RAN-cho gue-JI-to) is a 13,299-acre (21 sq mi) Mexican land grant in Southern California, approximately seven miles east of Escondido. Established in 1845, it remains one of the few intact Mexican land grants in California and has been the subject of conservation and development debates. The ranch has expanded to a total of 22,359 acres (35 sq mi) through the acquisition of adjacent land.

== History ==
In 1845, the 13,299-acre (21 sq mi) Rancho Guejito y Cañada de Palomia was granted by Mexican Governor Manuel Micheltorena to customs inspector and Justice of the Peace José María Orozco.

With the cession of California to the United States following the Mexican–American War, the 1848 Treaty of Guadalupe Hidalgo provided that the land grants would be honored. As required by the Land Act of 1851, a claim for Guejito y Cañada de Palomea was filed with the Public Land Commission in 1852, and the grant was patented to George W. Hamley on May 24, 1866, affirming his legal ownership.

Following Hamley's ownership, the land changed hands multiple times, with subsequent owners expanding its boundaries through the purchase of adjacent properties. By the late 20th century, the total acreage had grown to approximately 22,000 acres (34 sq mi).

Subsequent owners purchased adjacent properties, expanding the total acreage to about 22,000 acres (34 sq mi).

In 1974, the state parks division recommended acquiring Rancho Guejito as a park and nature reserve, but the purchase was vetoed by incoming Gov. Jerry Brown due to the cost. In 1974, industrialist Benjamin Coates purchased the land for $10 million. Since then, the land has remained mostly undeveloped and used as a cattle ranch.

Coates died in 2004. The land is owned by The Rancho Guejito Corporation, headed by Coates's daughter Theodate Coates.

Between 2003 and 2007, approximately 93 percent of the area was burned in several wildfires. An October 22, 2007 fire that began in the San Pasqual Valley near Guejito Creek, which is across the highway from Rancho Guejito, was dubbed the "Guejito Fire." The Guejito Fire merged into the Witch Fire early on October 22, which went on to burn homes in Rancho Bernardo and resulted in two deaths. The fires later resulted in settlements from utilities related to power lines that ignited the fire.

== Modern development ==
The ranch taps a water supply deep below the surface of the ground, which has facilitated its investment in agriculture and the expansion of its historic cattle ranching business. Starting in 2007, the ranch has planted approximately 500 acres of organic avocado groves, citrus trees and wine grapes. The ranch has pioneered local adoption of water-efficient technology including moisture sensors and a high-density planting method, allowing it to grow crops with one-fourth of the water used by other growers.

In 2009, representatives from The Rodney Co. contacted the county to discuss plans for developing the tract. Representatives proposed building approximately 10,000 homes and preserving about 16,000 of the 22,000 acres (89 km^{2}) in its natural state. Conservationists and residents of nearby communities have opposed development of the land.

In 2022, after 177 years of selling ranch-raised beef at auction, Rancho Guejito launched a direct-to-consumer beef program.
