= Rancho Solis =

Mexican land grant in California

Coordinates: 37.030°N 121.650°W

Rancho Solis was a 8,875-acre (35.92 km^{2}) Mexican land grant in present day Santa Clara County, California given in 1834 by Governor José Figueroa to Mariano Castro. The grant extended along Uvas Creek between present day Gilroy and Mount Madonna.

== History ==
The two square league Rancho Solis was granted to Mariano Castro.

With the cession of California to the United States following the Mexican-American War, the 1848 Treaty of Guadalupe Hidalgo provided that the land grants would be honored. As required by the Land Act of 1851, a claim for Rancho Solis was filed with the Public Land Commission in 1853, and the grant was patented to Rufina Castro in 1859.

John Hicks Adams purchased Rancho Solis in 1853. Adams was elected Sheriff of Santa Clara County in 1863 and moved to San Jose. He held this position for three successive terms until 1876.
