= Manuel Jimeno Casarín =

American politician

Manuel Jimeno Casarin (1815-1853) served as secretary of state under Governor Juan Bautista Alvarado and Governor Micheltorena, was a senior adviser to the government, and occasionally acting governor. He was married to María de las Angustias, the daughter of José de la Guerra y Noriega. Jimeno, who lived in Monterey, also was given land grants Rancho Salsipuedes (1840) in Santa Cruz County and Rancho Santa Paula y Saticoy (1843) in Ventura County and Rancho Jimeno (1844) in what is now Colusa County and Yolo County, California. Unlike many land grants holders, Jimeno was not required to show any use or development of the land and apparently he did not use the land, either for agriculture or ranching. He died in 1853 during a visit to Mexico.
