= Rancho Caslamayomi =

Historic Mexican land grant in California

Coordinates: 38.77°N 122.90°W

Rancho Caslamayomi was a 26,788-acre (108.41 km^{2}) Mexican land grant in present_day Sonoma County, California given in 1844 by Governor Manuel Micheltorena to Eugenio Montenegro. The grant cut across Little Sulphur Creek in the Mayacamas Mountains north of Healdsburg.

== History ==
Eugenio Montenegro (1815–) was a Mexican soldier, who came to California with José Figueroa. The Washington Hotel, Monterey, erected in 1832, was for a few years the private residence of Eugenio Montenegro. In 1840, Montenegro married Juana Maria Gertrudis Soberanes (1824–). Eugenio Montenegro, who had been promoted from customs guard to senior captain of his division, was granted the eight square league Rancho Caslamayomi in 1844. In 1848 Montenegro, who had returned to Mexico, sold the rancho to British merchant, William Forbes of Forbes & Barron of Tepic, Mexico. Forbes tried to extend the surveys to include the geysers and quicksilver mines in the mountains.

With the cession of California to the United States(US) following the Mexican-American War, the 1848 Treaty of Guadalupe Hidalgo provided that the land grants would be honored. As required by the Land Act of 1851, a claim for Rancho Caslamayomi was filed with the Public Land Commission in 1852, and the grant was patented to William Forbes in 1874.

In 1853, Montenegro called the deal off and sold the rancho to Jacob A. Morenhout. However, Forbes considered that he owned it (he was the patentee), and in 1857, Forbes sold the rancho to his business partner, William E. Barron. The property became involved in conflicting claims. Barron's heirs ultimately sold the rancho in 1883 to a group of over thirty settlers.
