= Rancho Potrero de San Luis Obispo =

Land grant in California

- Mexican land grant
- Location in California Rancho Potrero de San Luis Obispo (the United States)
- Coordinates: 35°20′24″N 120°40′12″W
- Country: United States
- State: California
- County: San Luis Obispo County, California, USA
- Established: 1842

Rancho Potrero de San Luis Obispo was a 3,506-acre (14.19 km^{2}) Mexican land grant in present day San Luis Obispo County, California given in 1842 by Governor Juan Alvarado to María Concepción Boronda. Potrero means "pasture" in Spanish. The grant was north of present day San Luis Obispo, and encompassed Cal Poly San Luis Obispo.

== History ==
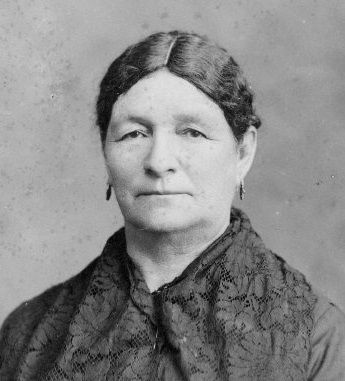
Maria Concepcion Boronda (1820-1906)

The Boronda family patriarch, Manuel Boronda (1750-1826) accompanied Junípero Serra’s second expedition to Alta California. By 1790, Boronda was stationed at the Presidio of San Francisco and married Maria Gertrudis Higuera (1776-1851). The three sons of Manuel and Gertrudis Boronda were: José Canuto Boronda (1792-1882); José Eusebio Boronda (1808-1880) grantee of Rancho Rincon de Sanjon; and José Manuel Boronda (1803-1878), grantee of Rancho Los Laureles.

José Canuto Boronda was a soldier at Monterey and Missions San Antonio, San Miguel and San Juan Bautista. He married Francisca Castro (1799-1830) and they had nine children. He received the one square league Rancho Potrero de San Luis Obispo land grant in about 1842. His daughter Maria Concepcion Boronda (1820-1906) received the patent in 1870. She married Oliver Deleissegues, a French sea captain, and after his death she married Jose Maria Munoz, an attorney in 1851.

With the cession of California to the United States following the Mexican-American War, the 1848 Treaty of Guadalupe Hidalgo provided that the land grants would be honored. As required by the Land Act of 1851, a claim for Rancho Potrero de San Luis Obispo was filed with the Public Land Commission in 1853, and the grant was patented to María Concepción Boronda in 1870.

In 1854, Francisco Estevan Quintana (1809–1880) purchased Rancho Potrero de San Luis Obispo from Maria Concepcion "Chona" Boronda Munoz. After visiting Alta California in 1839 and 1841, Quintana bought a ranch near in the vicinity of Paso Robles. In 1843 he left with a party from New Mexico with his family and livestock, traveling over the Old Spanish Trail to the San Bernardino Valley, then on to San Luis Obispo in 1844. There he served as alcalde of San Luis Obispo in 1845 and 1849.

In 1880, Estevan's wife, Maria de Guadalupe Lujan Quintana inherited the ranch house and surrounding farm lands on the Rancho Potrero. Half of the rancho went to the heirs of his deceased daughter Manuela, minor children of her husband Dolores Herrera: sons Francisco, Estevan and Benito Herrera and daughters Dolores and Hellena Herrera.

== See also ==
- Ranchos of California
- List of Ranchos of California
