= Rancho Sanjon de los Moquelumnes =

Mexican land grant in California

Coordinates: 38.320°N 121.340°W

Rancho Sanjon de los Moquelumnes was a 35,508-acre (143.70 km^{2}) Mexican land grant in present-day Sacramento County and San Joaquin County, California given in 1844 by Governor Manuel Micheltorena to Anastasio Chaboya. Sanjon is Spanish for ditch or deep slough. The grant stretched from the Cosumnes River on the north to the Mokelumne River on the south, and encompassed present-day Galt.

== History ==
Anastasio de Jesus Chaboya (1805–1852), son of De Anza Expedition soldier Marcos Chaboya, and brother of Antonio Chaboya grantee of Rancho Yerba Buena. Anastasio was a soldier of the San Francisco Company, and married Maria Josefa Higuera in 1829. He was granted the eight square league Rancho San Juan de los Moquelumnes in 1844.

With the cession of California to the United States following the Mexican-American War, the 1848 Treaty of Guadalupe Hidalgo provided that the land grants would be honored. As required by the Land Act of 1851, a claim for Rancho Sanjon de los Moquelumnes was filed with the Public Land Commission in 1852, and the grant was patented to Anastasio Chaboya in 1865.

Anastasio Chaboya was present at the murder of Edward Pyle, and a warrant was issued for Chaboya's arrest, but he was at the mines at the time. In 1852, Anastacio Chaboya was found hanging from a tree. No one ever confessed to the lynching of Chaboya. Chaboya died leaving 7 children - Angel Maria, Jose Antonio, Jose Fernando, Jose Fecundo, Maria Ygnacia, Maria Juana and Maria Micaela Policarpia. Eventually all the children sold their interests in the grant except for Policarpia.

William Hicks (1817–1884), was a native of Tennessee who came to California with the Chiles-Walker party in 1843. Known by most as "Uncle Billy", Hicks became friends with John Sutter. Hicks married Susannah Patterson at Sutter's Fort in 1848. He later married Sarah Davis Wilson, widow of sheriff Wilson. Hicks amassed a land empire, in Sacramento, San Joaquin, Stanislaus and Sonoma Counties, plus Marin County, where in 1855 he bought 4,000 acres (16.2 km^{2}) plus of Rancho Corte Madera de Novato. "Uncle Billy" Hicks died in 1884 at his home in Hicksville, Sacramento County, a town no longer in existence. There was a post office named Hicksville, 1860–1889. Hicksville dissolved in 1889 when the Central Pacific Railroad made Galt its headquarters between Lodi and Sacramento.

Hicks acquired Rancho Sanjon de los Moquelumnes in 1861, but lost in mortgage foreclosure to John F. McCauley in 1867. John F. McCauley married Caroline Wilson, William Hicks step daughter. John F. McCauley later acquired a great deal of the Hick's estate.

== See also ==
- Zanja
