= Rancho San Lorenzo (Sanchez) =

Mexican land grant in California

Coordinates: 36.370°N 121.070°W

Rancho San Lorenzo was a 48,286-acre (195.41 km^{2}) Mexican land grant in present-day San Benito and Monterey County, California given in 1846 by Governor Pío Pico to Rafael Sanchez. The grant was east of Soberanes Rancho San Lorenzo, and bounded on the north by Topo Creek.

== History ==
Rafael Sanchez came from Mexico to California in 1842 as secretary to Governor Manuel Micheltorena. He married Maria Antonia Castro (1826-), daughter of Jose Simeon Castro, grantee of Rancho Punta del Año Nuevo and Maria Antonia Pico grantee of Rancho Bolsa Nueva y Moro Cojo. Sanchez was granted the eleven square league Rancho San Lorenzo by Governor Pío Pico.

With the cession of California to the United States following the Mexican-American War, the 1848 Treaty of Guadalupe Hidalgo provided that the land grants would be honored. As required by the Land Act of 1851, a claim was filed with the Public Land Commission in 1853, and the grant was patented to Rafael Sanchez in 1870.

== See also ==
- Ranchos of California
- List of Ranchos of California
