= Rancho San Ysidro =

Spanish land grant in present-day Santa Clara County, California

Coordinates: 37.000°N 121.530°W

Rancho San Ysidro was a 13,066-acre (52.88 km^{2}) Spanish land grant in present-day Santa Clara County, California, given in 1809 by Governor José Joaquín de Arrillaga to Ygnacio Ortega. Today's city of Gilroy is on former Rancho Ysidro lands, as is nearby Old Gilroy.

== History ==
Ygnacio Ortega (1764–1829) was the son of José Francisco Ortega. Ygnacio became a soldier and married Gertrudis Arce (born 1772). In the 1790 California census, he is listed as mayordomo (foreman) at the Mission San Gabriel. After Ygnacio's death in 1833, with Alta California under Mexican rule, Governor José Figueroa divided Rancho Ysidro among his three children (and their spouses).

Rancho	Grantee	Spouse	Area	Patentee	Patented	Land Case No
Rancho La Polka	Maria Ysabel Ortega (1797 - )	Julian Cantua	4,167 acres (17 km^{2})	Martin Murphy	1860	159 ND
Rancho San Ysidro (Ortega)	Jose Quintin Ortega (1792 - )	Vicenta Butron	4,439 acres (18 km^{2})	Quintin Ortega	1868	163 ND
Rancho San Ysidro (Gilroy)	Maria Clara Ortega (1807 - )	John Gilroy	4,461 acres (18 km^{2})	John Gilroy	1867	216 ND

John Gilroy (1794–1869), born in Scotland as John Cameron, was one of the first English-speaking residents of Alta California, having arrived in Monterey, California in 1814. He took his mother's maiden name, and was later baptized as "Juan Bautista Gilroy". In 1821 he married Clara Ortega. With brothers-in-law Quintin Ortega and Julian Cantua, Gilroy made soap near San Felipe Lake (also called Upper Soap Lake), which he traded along with onions and flour from his gristmill to Thomas O Larkin of Monterey.

Captain John C. Frémont and his troops passed through Rancho San Ysidro on their way south in November 1846 during the Mexican American War and appropriated most of Gilroy's horses. John Gilroy served as an auxiliary alcalde and later as justice of the peace. When the town was incorporated in 1868, citizens honored Gilroy by naming their town after him. His adobe house, said to have been built in 1825, was located in what is now called "Old Gilroy" or "San Ysidro", two and a half miles (4 km) east of Gilroy. In later years, Gilroy lost his property, and he died almost penniless in 1869.

The railroad arrived in 1869, making the community the hub of South Santa Clara County. With the completion of the railroad and the demise of John Gilroy, the growth of the community of San Ysidro shifted two miles (3 km) west. The new Town of Gilroy was officially incorporated in 1870, becoming the largest community in Santa Clara County with a brewery, flouring mill and a distillery.

== Historic sites of the Rancho ==
- Christian Church of Gilroy was built in 1857, and is the oldest wood-framed church in Santa Clara County in continuous use.
- Gilroy Free Library
- Live Oak Creamery
- Old City Hall was completed in 1906
