= Rancho Corte Madera de Novato =

Mexican land grant in California

Coordinates: 38.130°N 122.680°W

Rancho Corte Madera de Novato was a 8,879-acre (35.93 km^{2}) Mexican land grant in present day Marin County, California given in 1839 by Governor Juan Alvarado to John Martin. The name means the "lumber mill of Novato". The grant extended along Hicks Valley north west of present day Novato.

== History ==
Englishman John (Juan) Martin (1787–1860) came to Yerba Buena in 1822, on the "Orion" (which also brought William A. Richardson). In 1826, Martin married Maria Tomasa Antonia Dominga Cantua, and settled at the Presidio of San Francisco. By 1832, he was farming near Sonoma. In 1837 he moved to Corte Madera de Novato where he was granted two square leagues in 1840. He lived there with his wife and the families of his children.

With the cession of California to the United States following the Mexican-American War, the 1848 Treaty of Guadalupe Hidalgo provided that the land grants would be honored. As required by the Land Act of 1851, a claim for Rancho Corte Madera de Novato was filed with the Public Land Commission in 1852, and the grant was patented to John Martin in 1863.

In 1852, Martin sold one square mile of the rancho to their daughter, Loretta and her husband, George Brewer. At the same time they granted another square mile to Loretta alone. In 1853, George Brewer, tried to have John Martin declared mentally incompetent, but lost the court case, and Martin began to divest himself of his land holdings. Brewer died in 1853, and Martin and Tomasa lived with Loretta. John Martin was dead by 1860, and Tomasa married Manuel Barra.

In 1855, William ("Uncle Billy") Hicks (1817–1884), who came to California with the Chiles-Walker party in 1843, bought 4,000 acres (16.2 km^{2}) of Rancho Corte Madera de Novato. He was an absentee landlord, living on Rancho Sanjon de los Moquelumnes, but Hicks Valley, and Hicks Mountain are named for him.

== See also ==
- Ranchos of California
- List of Ranchos of California
