= Rancho Salsipuedes =

Land grant in California

Coordinates: 36.970°N 121.700°W

Rancho Salsipuedes was a 31,201-acre (126.27 km^{2}) Mexican land grant in present day Santa Cruz County, California. Two leagues (8,856 acres or 3,584 ha) were granted in 1834 by Governor José Figueroa to Francisco de Haro. Eight leagues were granted in 1840 by Governor Juan Alvarado to Manuel Jimeno Casarín. The name means "go out if you can" in Spanish. Salsipuedes encompasses the mountainous area west of Gilroy, straddling the Santa Clara County - Santa Cruz County line (only about 5,400 acres or 21.9 km^{2} are in Santa Clara County).

== History ==
Two leagues were granted to Francisco de Haro (1792–1849) the first Alcalde (Mayor) of Yerba Buena in 1834. The rancho was regranted in 1840 to Manual Jimeno Casarin who served as secretary of state under Governor Alvarado and Governor Micheltorena, was a senior member of the Assembly, and occasionally acting governor. Casarin was married to María de las Angustias, the daughter of José de la Guerra y Noriega. Casarin, who lived in Monterey, also owned Rancho Santa Paula y Saticoy in Ventura County and Rancho Jimeno in Yolo County. Casarin died in 1853 during a visit to Mexico.

James Bryant Hill leased 1,000 acres (4.0 km^{2}) from Jimeno in 1851. In 1852 William Francis White, with E. Kelley, E. Casserly, J. R. McGlynn, W. W. Stowe, William Davidson and James Blair purchased the rancho, subject to the lease of Hill. James Bryant Hill later bought Rancho Nacional.

With the cession of California to the United States following the Mexican-American War, the 1848 Treaty of Guadalupe Hidalgo provided that the land grants would be honored. As required by the Land Act of 1851, a claim for Rancho Salsipuedes was filed with the Public Land Commission in 1853, and the grant was patented to John P. Davison, Stephen W. Tibbets, Joseph B. Crockett, Edward D. Baker, and heirs of James Blair (Mary J. Blair, widow, and Violet Blair, Jessup Blair and Lucy Blair, children) in 1861.

Subsequently the land was divided and W. F. White became owner of 3,000 acres (12.1 km^{2}). W. F. White was the only resident land owner on the Salsipuedes, but was not successful in his farming operations, and retired to San Francisco.
