= Rancho Bolsa del Pajaro =

Mexican land grant in California

Coordinates: 36.900°N 121.780°W

Rancho Bolsa del Pajaro was a 5,496-acre (22.24 km^{2}) Mexican land grant in present-day Santa Cruz County, California given in 1837 by Governor Juan B. Alvarado to Sebastian Rodríguez. The name means "pocket of the Pajaro". Pocket usually refers to land surrounded by slough—in this case the Watsonville Slough. The grant extended from Monterey Bay to present-day Watsonville with the Pajaro River as its southern boundary.

== History ==
The two square league grant was made to Sebastian Rodriguez, a soldier at the Presidio of Monterey. Sebastian Rodriguez was commissioner for the Mission Santa Cruz.

With the cession of California to the United States following the Mexican-American War, the 1848 Treaty of Guadalupe Hidalgo provided that the land grants would be honored. As required by the Land Act of 1851, a claim for Rancho Bolsa del Pajaro was filed with the Public Land Commission in 1852, and the grant was patented to Sebastian Rodríguez in 1860.

In 1852, Judge John H. Watson (–1882) and D.S. Gregory, an attorney, claimed Rancho Bolsa del Pajaro through a sale by the brother of Sebastian Rodríguez, Alejandro Rodríguez (1791–1848). Watson came from San Francisco as a district judge, but after a year resigned from the bench of the third district court but remained in the area as a lawyer. Watson and Gregory had secured interests from Alejandro Rodriguez and claimed the original grant was made to Alejandro Rodríguez and Sebastian Rodríguez. A claim for a half interest in Rancho Bolsa del Pajaro filed by John H. Watson and D. S. Gregory with the Land Commission in 1853 was rejected. Watson was elected to the California State Senate in 1859, and died in Elko, Nevada in 1882.

Considerable litigation ensued between the heirs of Sebastian Rodriguez and heirs of Alejandro Rodriguez, claimants to Rancho Bolsa del Pajaro. It was finally settled in favor of Sebastian Rodriguez.

When Sebastian Rodriguez died his children Jacinto Rodriguez, Jose Rodriguez, Maria Antonia Rodriguez, Rafaela Rodriguez, Pedro Rodriguez, Desiderio Rodriguez and Francisco Solano Rodriguez) inherited the rancho.

== See also ==
- Ranchos of Santa Cruz County, California
