= Rancho Las Camaritas =

California land grant

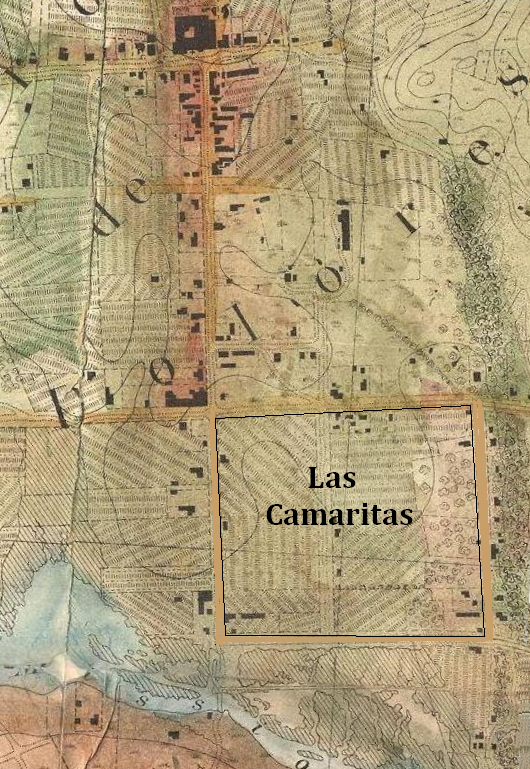
1858 Map: San Francisco Mission District – Las Camaritas Land Grant

Rancho Las Camaritas was an Alta California land grant, a square of 300 Mexican varas on each side; varas being one pace, in this case 2.75 feet (16.625 acres or 6.73 hectares) to José de Jesús Noé on January 21, 1840, by Governor Juan Bautista Alvarado. Millions of acres of California land was given at no charge to men between 1784 and 1846 by the Spanish (1784–1810) or Mexican governments (1819–1846) mostly for military service to raise cattle on. About 300 of the 800 Land grants were sizable varying from a few thousand to 1.5 million acres – see List of ranchos of California for the larger grants. Following the Mexican–American War, the land grants were challenged with most of them falling into American hands. Only one land grant has remained undeveloped (see Rancho Legacy). The ownership of Las Camaritas was disputed in court by the U.S. government from 1856 until 1882 due to conflicting documentation presented by its American owner Ferdinand Vassault after a string of sales initiated by Jose Noe sometime between 1842 and 1846.

== History ==
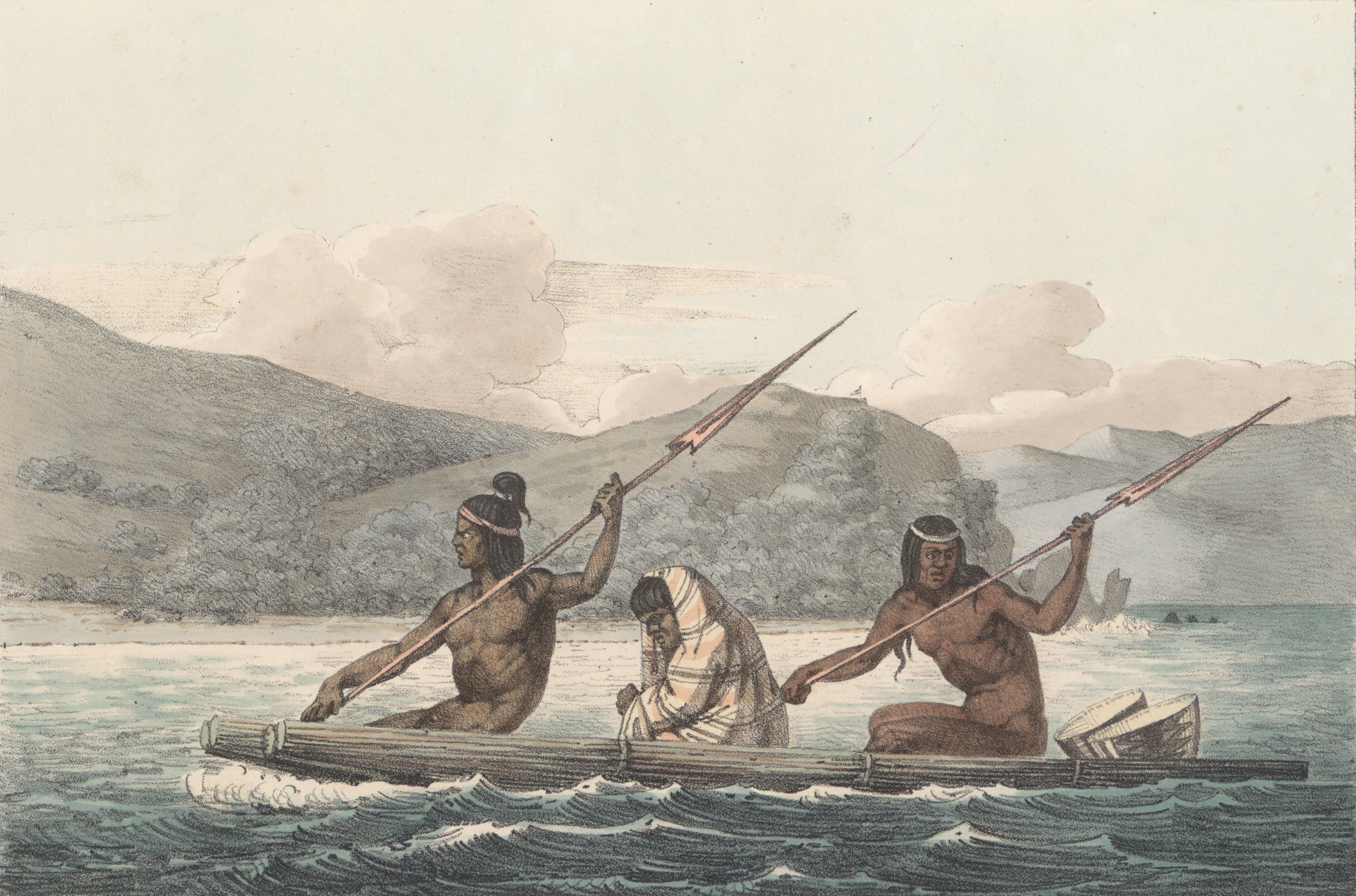
Ohlone Indians in a Tule Boat: San Francisco Bay, by Louis Choris, 1816

Las Camaritas was part of the Yelamu Ohlone territory going back 5,000 years. It is located near the Yelamu's migratory summer village of Chutchui. The village is a short distance from the original location for Mission San Francisco de Asís that was first identified by the Spanish Juan Bautista de Anza expedition on March 29, 1776.

A number of Papal Bulls including the 1455 Romanus Pontifex and the 1493 Inter caetera as amended by the Treaty of Tordesillas allowed Christians to take the lands of non-Christians anywhere in the world and reduce its people to perpetual slavery. These Bulls were part of the justification used by Spain in 1769 to establish Missions from San Diego to San Francisco. However, the Spanish crown promised the Ohlone people and all other coastal tribes that they would retain control over their lands if they became Christians and followed the laws of Spain.

From June 29, 1776, until the passage of the Mexican secularization act of 1833 all the land within present-day San Francisco was under the control of Mission San Francisco de Asís. The Secularization Act shut down all of Alta California's Missions and sold them off. The Act was primarily a deal with California's Dons to retain their allegiance to Mexico, giving them control over millions of acres of lands promised to tribal people the church held prior to 1833. Governor Figueroa issued a regulation (Reglamento Provisional para la secularizacion de las Misiones) on August 9, 1834, outlining the requirements for the distribution of property (land, cattle and equipment) to each mission's neophytes. However, most of the neophytes were driven away from the Mission and never knew of the Reglamento offering them land.

Jose Noe was part of the Híjar-Padrés colony of 1834 that attempted to consolidate Mexican control over Alta California but failed. Noe was the only Híjar colony member that was able to settle in Northern California.

Noe was the last Mexican alcalde of Yerba Buena, which was renamed San Francisco after the conclusion of the Mexican–American War in 1846. Jose Noe was elected as the village's Alcalde twice: first as the 7th Alcalde (1842–1843) and again as the 12th Alcalde in 1846. Prior to Mexico becoming independent of Spain, Alcaldes were to have been elected from the indigenous tribal communities surrounding the local Catholic mission – in this case Mission San Francisco de Asís.

Noe applied to the governor on October 3, 1839, for Rancho Las Camaritas and was given the land grant on January 21, 1840. According to the state of California's summary of the Spanish and Mexican land grant era, the government required the following four steps to obtain land:

- The first step was the submitting of a petition by an applicant, containing the name, religion, residence occupation, and the size of the family. Along with a land description and, at times, a map of the tract (diseno). The diseno (map) and land description were usually very vague, calling to sloughs, trees, hills, and other features which were not very permanent.
- The second step was the inquiries by officials into the availability of the land, the character of the applicant, and the posting of the petition in case another party had objections to the approval of the application.
- The third step was the Informe which was usually a separate document or a note appended to the original application, stating the findings of the officials in Step Number 2. This third step usually entailed the actual grant of land or refusal of the grant of land
- The fourth and final step was the confirmation of the grant by the Viceroy. This final step made the title to the land perfect. The applicant or grantee was given possession by the Alcalde (local judge) who caused the grantee to pull up grass, throw stones, break twigs, and exclaim, "Viva el Presidente y la Nación Mexicana" (long live the President and the Mexican Nation). During the Mexican era, these four steps were also used with minor alterations.

In Noe's original petition to governor Alvarado, he proposed to construct a house and grow vegetables on Las Camaritas for his family. The property was known during the American era as Noah's garden. Las Camaritas means little cabins, possibly referring to Noe's small cabins he had on the property. Maps identify his adobe home and a number of other structures were located on the northwest corner of 15th and Mission Street.

The land is located in San Francisco's Mission District within the area bounded by 14th Street, Mission Street, 16th Street, and Shotwell Street, with its southern border parallel to and about 300 feet north of 16th Street (the property extending 825 feet south from 14th Street and the same distance east from Mission Street).

== Geography ==
Rancho Las Camaritas is located in California on the San Francisco peninsula that lies between the San Francisco Bay to the east and the Pacific Ocean to the west. Its location between the Pacific and North American tectonic plates makes it one of the most seismically active regions in the world. The San Francisco Bay is part of the Sacramento–San Joaquin River Delta(the largest estuary on the Pacific Coast) that was shaped by the last ice age. Due to the coastal updwelling of minerals and cold water from the California Current, it is also one of the world's most biologically active regions. It was once home to one of the largest populations of birds in the world and is along the Pacific Flyway. The peninsula's Mediterranean climate is tempered with mild winters followed by cool, dry, but foggy summers. Due to its seismic activity the peninsula has many hills, with Twin Peaks to the west, forming a fog break for Las Camaritas and the Mission District, giving it a warm sunny Microclimate that is protected from foggier areas of the city that make its temperature warmer than the rest of San Francisco. This climate played a prominent role in its selection as Spain's Mission in 1776.

Las Camaritas was originally bordered by a sausal (Spanish for willow wetland) along 14th Street, and the salt marsh of the tidal estuary called Mission Creek on the east side. A tiny lake was indicated, by at least one map, partially on the property at its southwestern corner, north of the corner of Sixteenth and Mission Streets today, but probably not as close to 16th as the rough sketch map implies. Early maps identify Harrison Street as the Mission Creek's stream bed crossing 16th, then called Center Street. Mission Creek was navigable by boat up to the 16th Street wharf (or the Mission Embarcadero) for the Mission San Francisco de Asís. Las Camaritas has alluvial soil making it a good candidate for agricultural use which was how the land was used during its early years after America took control of California. During the early American era, the Mission Woolen Goods factory was located along its east border, reflecting the period's ranching background.

The lagoon located along its west side known as Lake Dolores was very likely the same body of water that the original Mission was founded next to back in 1776. In this case, much reduced in size due to the large cattle operations that the church operated combined with many years of droughts. The evidence of the lagoon's existence can be seen with its very high-water table and the problems BART had constructing its underground line back in the 1960s.

The Mission Creek was filled in by an order of the San Francisco Board of Supervisors on August 24, 1876, after a number of prominent San Franciscans(Claus Spreckels and John Center) failed to convince the supervisors to turn the creek into a canal all the way to 18th and Harrison Street.

== Annexation ==
Following the Bear Flag Rebellion and Mexican–American War the United States signed the Treaty of Guadalupe Hidalgo with the Republic of Mexico that included the promise to respect the title of lands (Ranchos) held by the citizens of Alta California made prior to 1846. The Public Land Commission was formed in 1851 to settle control of nearly 800 land claims that led to nearly 40 years of legal challenges covering over 8 million acres of prime real estate with most Ranchos taken over by Americans.

"Afore I came away from hum, I hed a strong persuasion thet Mexicans worn't human beans, - An ourang-outang nation, A sort o' folks a chap could kill An' never dream on't arter, No more'n a feller'd dream of pigs That he hed hed to slarter; I'd an idee that they were built arter the darde fashion all, An' kickin' colored folk about, you know, 's a kind o' national." -James Russell Lowell, The Biglow Papers, First Series, No. II (1848)

After 1846, Jose Noe retreated from his homes he had at Yerba Buena and Las Camaritasto to live at his Rancho San Miguel in present-day Noe Valley. He supposedly turned control of Las Camaritas over to former Alcalde Francisco Guerrero who was killed in 1851 while coming back to the Mission from a Public Land Commission hearing.

Between 1850 and 1854, the state of California passed a series of legislative actions proposed by San Francisco that progressively annexed the original Pueblo – Mission San Francisco de Asis, which had been the district capital for the area between Santa Clara to Sonoma county, including the East Bay during the Mexican era. Known today as the Mission District, its citizen's sent repeated petitions to the state legislature opposing the city's annexation proposals.

On April 2, 1855, the San Francisco Board of Aldermen (predecessors of the San Francisco Board of Supervisors) adopted Alderman Van Ness's "scheme for the settlement of City Titles... The city relinquishes all her right and claims to lands in favor of present possessors... situated within the corporate limits of the city... as passed April 15th, 1851..."

The primary goal of the ordinance was to allow squatters to take control of land within the city limits annexed by the city in 1851 that was contrary to the federal Land Commission's certification on February 3, 1853, of the four square league land claim of Joseph Yves Limantour for most of San Francisco. This included the squatters that took possession illegally across the Mission. One of the earliest squatters who took extensive lands in the Mission was John Center, who according to future Mayor Sunny James Rolph donated the property to construct the Marshall School, that had previously been the state's first insane asylum.

Following the state legislature's approval of the "Van Ness Ordinance", on March 11, 1858, California Governor Weller signed it into law. The Limantour and Santilan land claims for most of San Francisco that took until 1879 to resolve were thus ignored by the city and state.

The original Land Claim in 1835 for San Francisco (Yerba Buena) by William A. Richardson before the Public Land Commission failed. However, a claim by the city of San Francisco was accepted in 1853 that was later expanded to 4 square leagues of the San Francisco Peninsula based on Spanish and Mexican law that allowed Pueblos to claim said lands. However, neither the Presideo or Mission San Francisco de Asis ever formally made the request. The city's claim was challenged by the United States before the U.S. Supreme Court. The city eventually won its claim on June 20, 1884.

== Yelamu Ohlone Tribe's Sovereign Status ==
According to the 2009 study "Ohlone/Costanoan Indians of the San Francisco Peninsula and their Neighbors, Yesterday and Today" by Randall Milliken, Laurence H. Shoup, and Beverly R. Ortiz, the Yelamu people inhabited the land area currently known as the City of San Francisco prior to the arrival of Europeans. The Yelamu, Aramai and Lamchin groups that inhabited the peninsula were the first to be forcefully rounded up with the opening of Mission San Francisco de Asís in 1776.

According to researchers, this Ramaytush speaking tribal group of approximately 200 individuals was broken down into four migratory village clusters. The Yelamu village known as Chutchui and its shellmound was located partially within Rancho Las Camaritas according to former San Francisco Mayor Sunny James Rolph. Contrary to previous beliefs that all ancestors from the Peninsula had gone extinct, the Milliken, Shoup and Ortiz study turned up a single surviving family line from the Aramai/Yelamu tribal group in Pacifica, which could suggest that more research could turn up Yelamu ancestors as the tribe interacted with others as far away as the East Bay prior to and during the Mission era.

Between 1769 and 1821, the Yelamu and other coastal tribes across the state were rounded up and forced into Spain's Catholic Missions. After gaining independence, Mexico legislated the closure of the missions in 1833, giving away tribal lands without consulting with them. At its closing, there were just 204 Neophytes (or new converts to the Catholic religion) at Mission San Francisco de Asís. All of the above Neophytes would have been candidates to receive land owned by the Mission as ordered by Governor Figueroa's 1834 Reglamento but were driven out of the mission or never told. An 1842 census at the Mission identified 37 neophytes left in the district. The Mission took in Ohlone people from the East and South Bay as well as Miwok and other tribes to the north that should have been able to make claims on their ancestral lands rather than in San Francisco or San Mateo.

With California becoming a possession of the United States following the Treaty of Guadalupe Hidalgo on February 2, 1848, all of Alta California's land grants fell under the U.S. Supreme Court's 1823 legal decision known as the Discovery Doctrine that barred any tribe's sovereign rights based upon a decree made by the Catholic Church in 1493 at the start of colonial Europe's "Age of Discovery". The treaty with Mexico did require that the United States respect the property (land grants) of Alta Californian's as of 1846. As mentioned in the Annexation section, the U.S. government set up the Public Land Commission to adjudicate the validity of each Spanish or Mexican land claim, failing to consult with its rightful tribal owners. The extent on how far newly arrived Americans were willing to go was first demonstrated in 1849 at California's Constitutional convention where the majority of representatives blocked the right to vote of the state's First People.

Even with its own version of the Discovery Doctrine in place, the U.S. government tried to reinforce its legal authority by force as the flood of gold miners into the Sierra foothills from 1849 led to increasing tensions. This included Senator John C. Frémont's newly acquired Rancho Las Mariposas Land grant of 44,387-acre that was heavily populated with many of the state's tribal people who had fled their coastal lands during the Spanish-Mexican era.

On April 14, 1851, the Mariposa Battalion was bivouacked at Camp Barbour located along the San Joaquin River in the foothills of the Sierra Nevadas in Fresno County some 150 miles above Stockton. The U.S. government assigned Redick McKee, George W. Barbour and O. M. Wozencraft as commissioners with the assistance of the US Army and Jim Savage's state sanctioned militia – Mariposa Battalion to round up and force California tribes to sign treaties that contained 7 main articles that gave away their ancestral lands and rights in exchange for their resettlement on 18 different reservations located across the state. Article 3 of each treaty had the following wording:

"The said tribes or bands hereby jointly and severally relinquish, and forever quit claim to the United States all the right, title, claim or interest of any kind they or either of them have or ever had to lands or soil in California."

As detailed in the Department of the Interior's May 22, 1852 report listing the tribes that were hunted down by the Mariposa Battalion and forced to sign the treaties between May 13, 1851, and January 1852, no tribal representative from any of the Yelamu Ohlone people ever signed away their ancestral lands. California representatives were successful in blocking the ratification of the treaties and censoring any knowledge of them for over fifty years.

On April 22, 1850, the California legislature passed the Act for the Government and Protection of Indians that removed the civil rights of the state's tribal people. Yet the United States ignored this legislation with the Compromise of 1850 that admitted California as an undivided free state on September 9, 1850. The Indian Protection Act which set off the murder and sale of tribal people as slaves was not repealed until 1937. Over $1.5 million was spent during the 1850s to eradicate the state's tribal people – see History of California § California Genocide.

On January 7, 1851, the Governor of California, Peter H. Burnett, signed an Executive Order to Exterminate all Indians. The state's action set off the second round of genocide that dramatically reduced the state's tribal populations.

The Indian Appropriations Act § 1871 stated that “no Indian nation or tribe” would be recognized “as an independent nation, tribe, or power with whom the United States may contract by treaty.”

University of California anthropologist Alfred L. Kroeber claimed that the Ohlone people had gone extinct. However, Ohlone tribal members either hid their true identity or fled the bay area to Southern California, the Sierra's or further north to escape from being killed or enslaved.

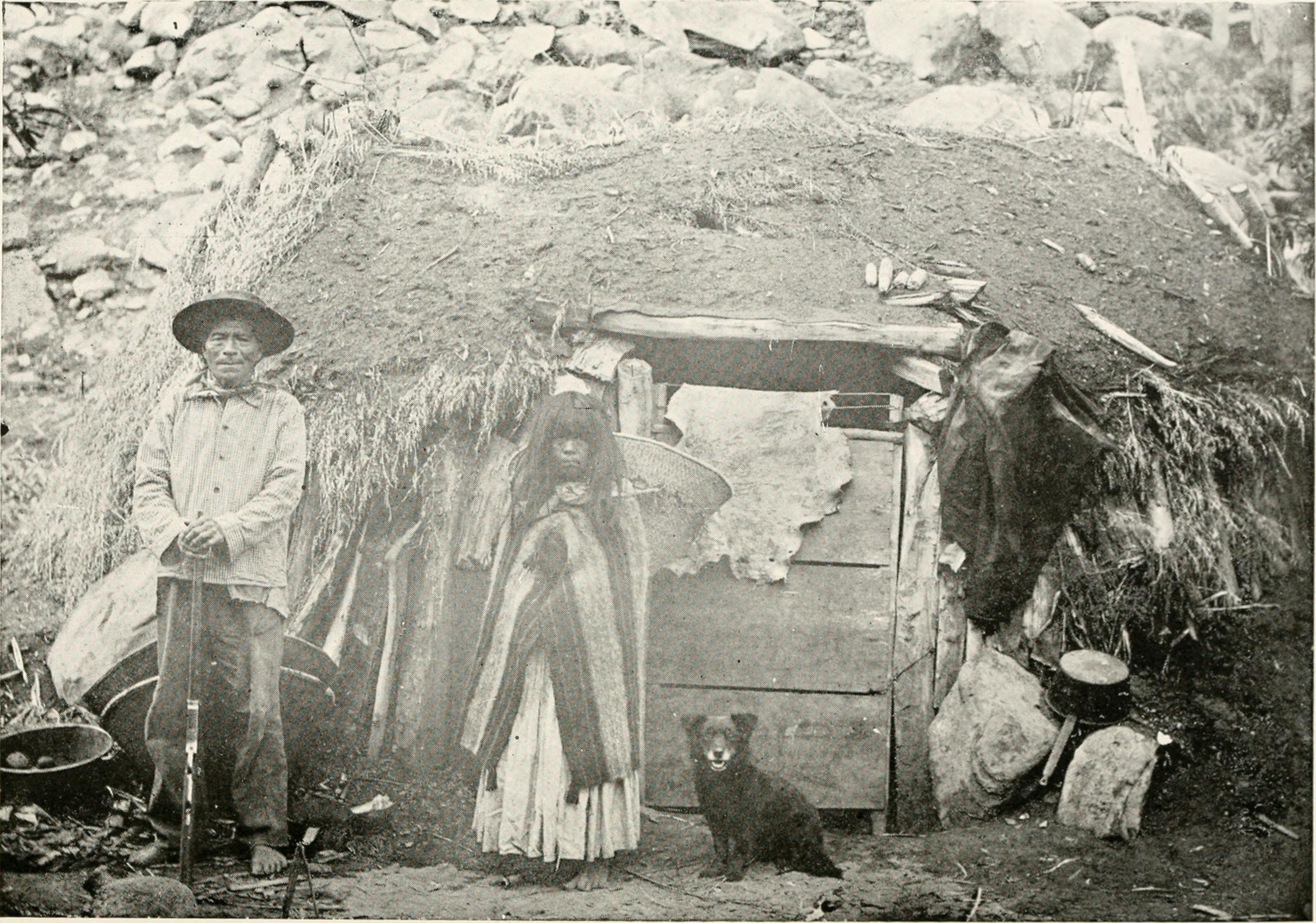
circa 1917 – Example of a homeless California Tribal family

Following passage of the Dawes Act that gave small amounts of land to tribes in Southern California a small group of white reformers created the Northern California Indian Association (NCIA), and organized a campaign that led to the exposure of the secret 1851 treaties and federal legislation on June 21, 1906, that gave $100,000 to purchase land for some homeless tribal communities. No Ohlone tribal group was included.

The May 18, 1928 California Claims Act authorized the attorney general of California to bring an action in the United States Claims Court on behalf of the “Indians of California” for compensation for the approximately 8.5 million acres of lands which tribes in California reserved in the eighteen unratified treaties negotiated in 1851 and 1852.

In 1958 Congress enacted the California Rancheria Act, which authorized the termination of federal supervision and services to forty-one named tribes in California. The Ohlone were not included as the tribe had been delisted as did many other California tribes in 1927 by the Bureau of Indian Affairs.

In 1978 the U.S. upgraded its process for tribes to gain federal recognition.

On October 9, 2002, after nearly 20 years of work, the Muwekma Ohlone Tribe was refused federal recognition by the Bureau of Indian Affairs Ohlone attempts to gain federal recognition over the last 35 years has been blocked partially due to the strict rules that include a catch-22 scenario. One of the regulations for obtaining status is that the tribe be in possession of traditional lands.

Even though the Ohlone people have been unjustly been denied any compensation for their lands rightfully theirs over the last 180 years they are still striving to obtain federal recognition and the return of lands like Las Camaritas that was once near their Chutchui village.

== U.S. Land Commission claim ==
The Public Land Commission was created by congress on March 3, 1851, that established a three-member Commission in San Francisco from January 2, 1852, to March 3, 1856, with the purpose of reviewing the land claims in California of Mexicans as promised in Articles VII and IX of the Treaty of Guadalupe Hidalgo. Of the 803 land claims filed, 604 were confirmed, however nearly all were appealed by various parties in the United States District Court for the Northern District of California. In most of these appeals led to its original owners losing control of their lands due to legal costs, language barriers and sheer hostility against them that held up title in many cases into the 1880s. The Las Camaritas case was no different.

In summary, with its high quality and location sitting along water and next to the former Ohlone village of Chutchui, it would have been one of the first pieces of property chosen by Ohlone tribal members as theirs to live on, but were denied due to the lawless Californio legal system from 1834 to 1846 after the secularization of the Missions. In an attempt to rectify these wrongs, the Catholic Church's representative Joseph Sadoc Alemany applied to the commission to obtain land for First Nation Natives around each mission statewide, but was turned down. In the case of the Ohlone surviving members resulting in destroying their chances in the future of becoming a sovereign nation. Instead, Jose Noe, who had only been in San Francisco for five years was granted the 18 acre Las Camaritas at no cost by Alta California's governor in 1840. The following timeline lists the record of how Las Camaritas was sold:

- May 6, 1845 Noe to Andres Hoeppner – (Hoeppner paid $400 pg 29)
- April 12, 1847 Hoeppner to Joel Dedmand (Dedmand paid $1,800 pg 43)
- December 19, 1848 Dedmand to WJ Reynolds – (Reynolds paid $1,800 pg 43)
- December 19, 1848 Reynolds to WDM Howard – (Howard paid $2,000 pg 44)
- January 23, 1850 Howard to Quartus Sparks – (Sparks paid $2,000 pg 45)
- November 21, 1851 Partial sale Sparks to John Center – (Center paid $4,500 pg 75)
- December 31, 1851 Partial Trust Mary Hamilton for Mary Hamilton Sparks pg 71-76
- February 11, 1852 Hamilton and Sparks to John Center for rest of property – (Center paid $2,800 pg 71)

On February 22, 1853, Ferdinand Vassault purchased what he thought was the title of Las Camaritas from Jose Noe for $5.00. (pg 36) Vassault filed his claim of ownership for Las Camaritas two days later with the Public Land Commission. What Vassault didn't know was that the property had already changed hands at least five times and was now in the hands of John Center. Noe, who spoke no English probably had no idea what Vassault got him to sign away for five dollars.

Vassault was a prominent San Franciscan and 49'er. He was an active member of the Vigilance Committees of 1851 and 1856, as well as the secretary for the Society of California Pioneers. He also organized and built the 1851 Plank Road from Yerba Buena (San Francisco) to the Mission that ended right at the doorstep of Las Camaritas. His claim was accepted by the Commission on September 4, 1855 but then appealed by the U.S. Attorney General on February 11, 1856(pg 85). The government's appeal was upheld on July 6, 1858 (pg 102). On December 4, 1866, Northern California US District Judge Hoffman upheld Vassault's title, denying the U.S. appeal (pg 104). In 1890, the California Surveyor General issued its final report of all Land Grants that obtained final patents – the final legal step in certifying ownership. The final report acknowledged that Las Camaritas received its final patent on December 18, 1882, or 29 years after its original application.

Various witnesses presented conflicting information during the hearings about the property's exact size as well as when it was sold, and to whom. Former Mission San Francisco Alcalde Francisco Sanchez said that Jose Noe sold the property for $400 some time between 1842–43 to Don Andres (Hoeppner). Francisco also testified that "Don Andres" transferred the property to Quarturs Sparks.(page 15) Jean Jacques Vioget (who made the first known 1839 map of Yerba Buena) and Robert Ridley testified that Noe sold the property to Hoeppner on July 6, 1846(pg 33) Ridley, Yerba Buena's Port Captain were drinking buddies with Hoeppner and Vioget.

Quarturs and Mary Sparks were Mormons who arrived from Massachusetts on July 31, 1846, on the trading ship Brooklyn that was captained by Samuel Brannan. They broke from the Mormon group and settled in the Mission, buying Las Camaritas on January 23, 1850, for $2,000 from the prominent alderman and landowner William Davis Merry Howard. In the 1879 congressional report (see link), they were listed as having the first deed for the Las Camaritas property as part of Vasault's claim before the Public Land Commission, which is incorrect.

The above 1879 congressional report for the chain of ownership does not match the actual District court transcripts on page 80 that details the exact dates of who the title was sold to, that witnesses claimed to start with Andress Hoeppner. The commission looked the other way while Vassault made Joshua Childs and John Center joint partners(pg 30 and 35) for the claim after filing for it. Any wonder why the U.S. Attorney appealed the original decision? But then, as shown above in the court testimony, the stories during the appeal only got worse.

Witnesses at least confirmed that Noe had built a cabin, a mill and several other buildings located on the Northwest corner of the Rancho, and had fenced it in, using the western half to grow grain on. Both Robert Ridley and Alcalde Francisco Sanchez said that Noe left the property in 1842 when he became Alcalde for Yerba Buena.(page 34) Whether Ridely's original testimony is correct that Hoeppner took over the land then or whether the Indian servants he mentioned that built the fence, a house, grain mill and huts for the workers stayed on to run the site for him is unclear.

It would be John Center whose name would show up owning most of Las Camaritas land, as well as much more in the vicinity as documented in his 1908 biography and his controversial actions. Center showed up in numerous news stories during the squatter riots, including one event where an individual was killed. And as mentioned, he and Claus Spreckels attempted to get the city to turn Mission Creek into a canal but failed as the two of them held much of the property around the Creek.

During the years following America's conquest of California, the rancho was known as "Noah's Garden", or a slang reference to Noe's name.

== Streets ==
The following streets are located in or border the Las Camaritas land grant:

- Mission Street – Originally known as the Plank road was a toll road built by Ferdinand Vassault and Charles Wilson between downtown San Francisco and the Mission in 1850.
- South Van Ness Avenue – Was originally known as Howard Street, was named after William Davis Merry Howard – member of San Francisco's council or Ayuntamiento between 1849 and 1850 – was changed to South Van Ness following the 1906 earthquake. Van Ness was named for Mayor James Van Ness.
- Capp Street – Was named after C.S. Capp, the real estate agent, one time Deputy County Clerk
- Shotwell Street – no current naming history
- Folsom Street – Was named after Joseph L. Folsom, a member of the quartermaster's department of the United States army in 1848–49.
- Harrison Street – Was named after Henry A. Harrison a member of the city's pre-American town council or Ayuntamiento between 1849 and 1850.
- Minna Street – no current naming history
- Natoma Street – Was originally named for WMD Howard's partner Henry Mellus but, due to a breakup, renamed Natoma, a tribe located near the American river.
- Sixteenth Street – Originally Central, or Center Street, that ran from Mission Dolores church to Mission Creek
- Adair Street – No current naming history – first appeared on December 6, 1877, Daily Alta California Real Estate advertisement and listed as a street in SF Langley Directory in 1879.
- Fifteenth Street – Originally Sparks Street, named after Mormon couple that held first American title to Las Camaritas.
- Fourteenth Street – Originally named Tracy Street as identified in 1852 Eddy Map of SF.

== Prominent properties ==
- Bay Area Rapid Transit – Sixteenth Street Station
- Redstone Building – Sixteenth & Capp – Formerly the San Francisco Labor Temple – San Francisco Historic Landmark #238
- Camaritas Springs – Later known as Center Water Works – Sixteenth and Shotwell Street – Private water company owned by John Center that played an important role in keeping the 1906 Earthquake fire from spreading east along Howard Street (Present-day South Van Ness).
- Asylum for the Deaf, Dumb and Blind – Located at the corner of 15th and Mission, the Institution was funded by the state of California in 1860 and opened in 1861(see linked image). It operated at this location until 1867 when it was moved to Berkeley Ca. The Merchant's Seamen hospital moved into the facility for several years but was replaced by the Mission Grammar School in 1876, which lasted until the 1906 Earthquake.
- Center Woolen Mills - was built by John Center and sold to Lazard Frere family and renamed Mission Woolen Mills. It was built along Mission Creek at 16th Street and Folsom. - see images below
- Marshall Elementary School

== Gallery ==
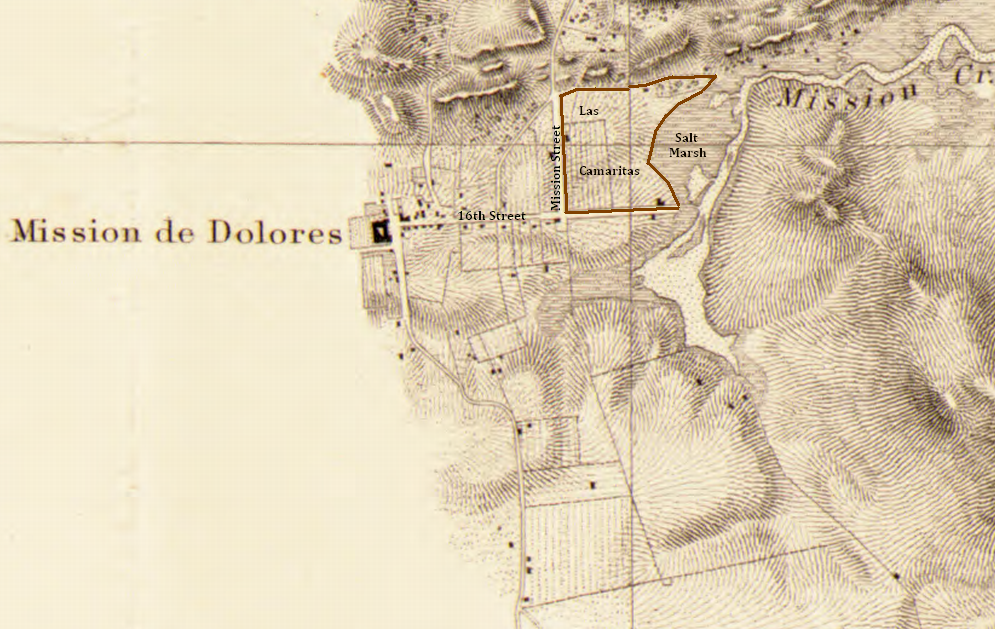
1859 US Survey Map showing Las Camaritas

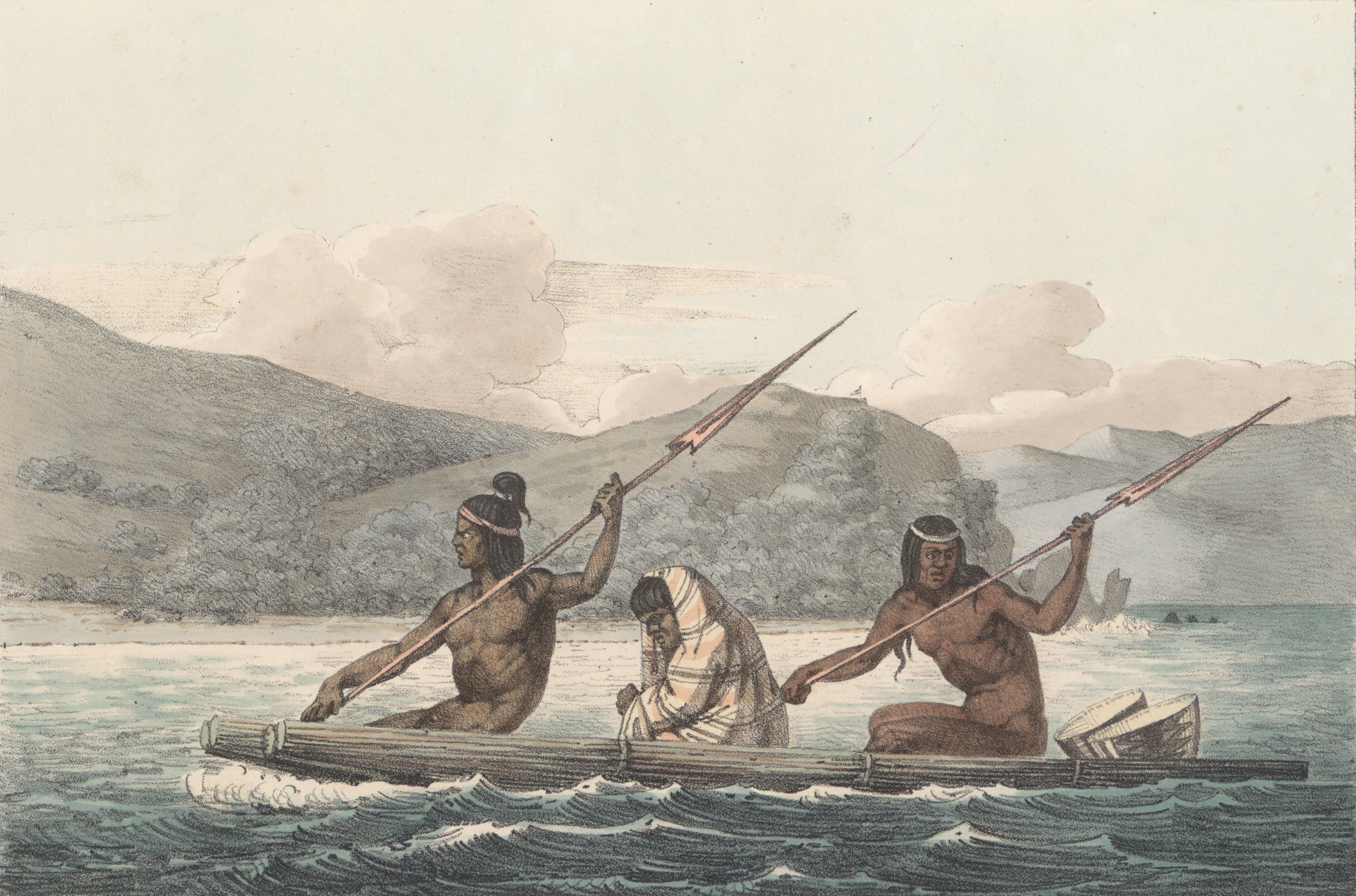
Ohlone Indians in a Tule Boat in the San Francisco Bay, by Louis Choris, 1816

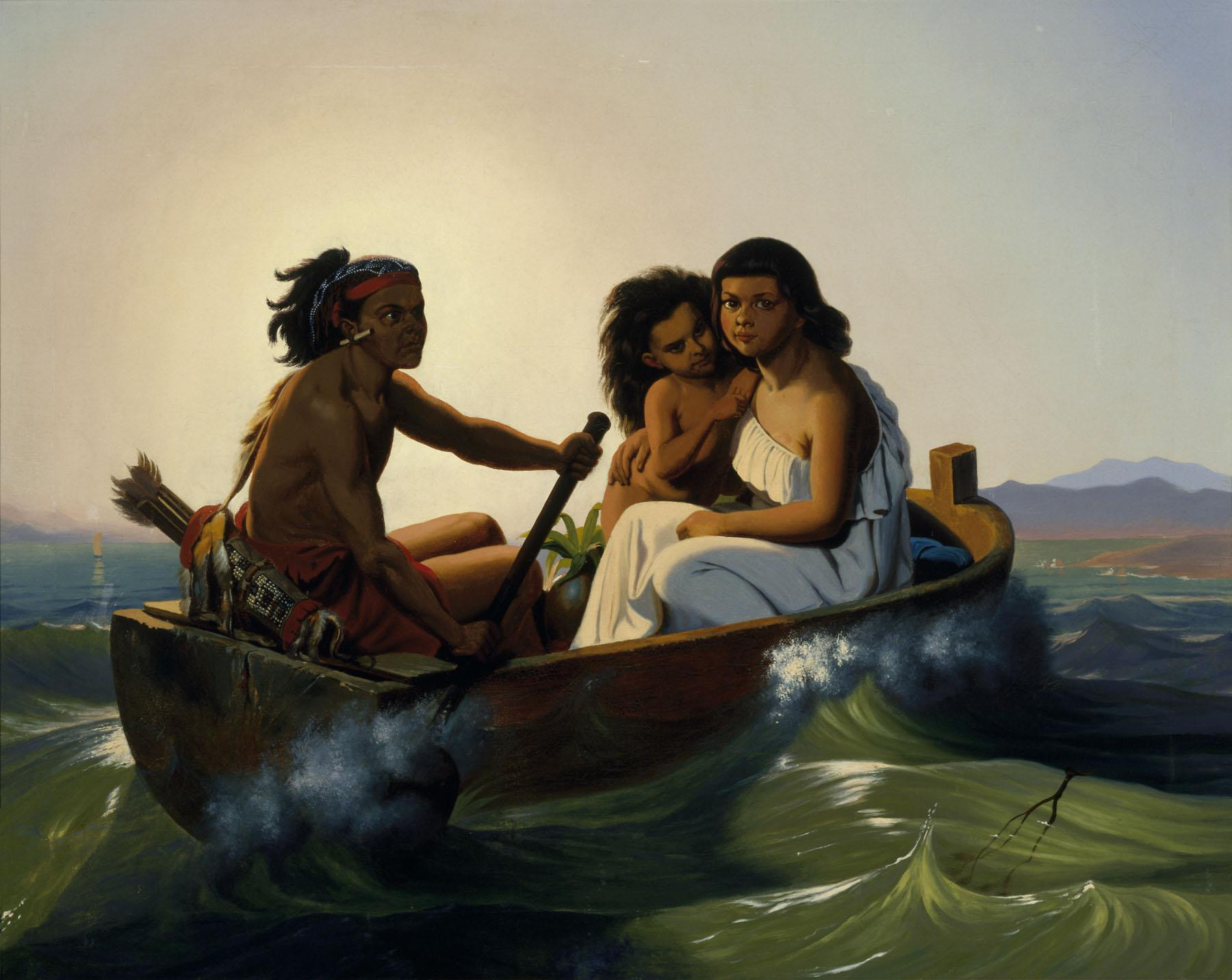
Indian Family on San Francisco Bay 1878 by Charles Nahl

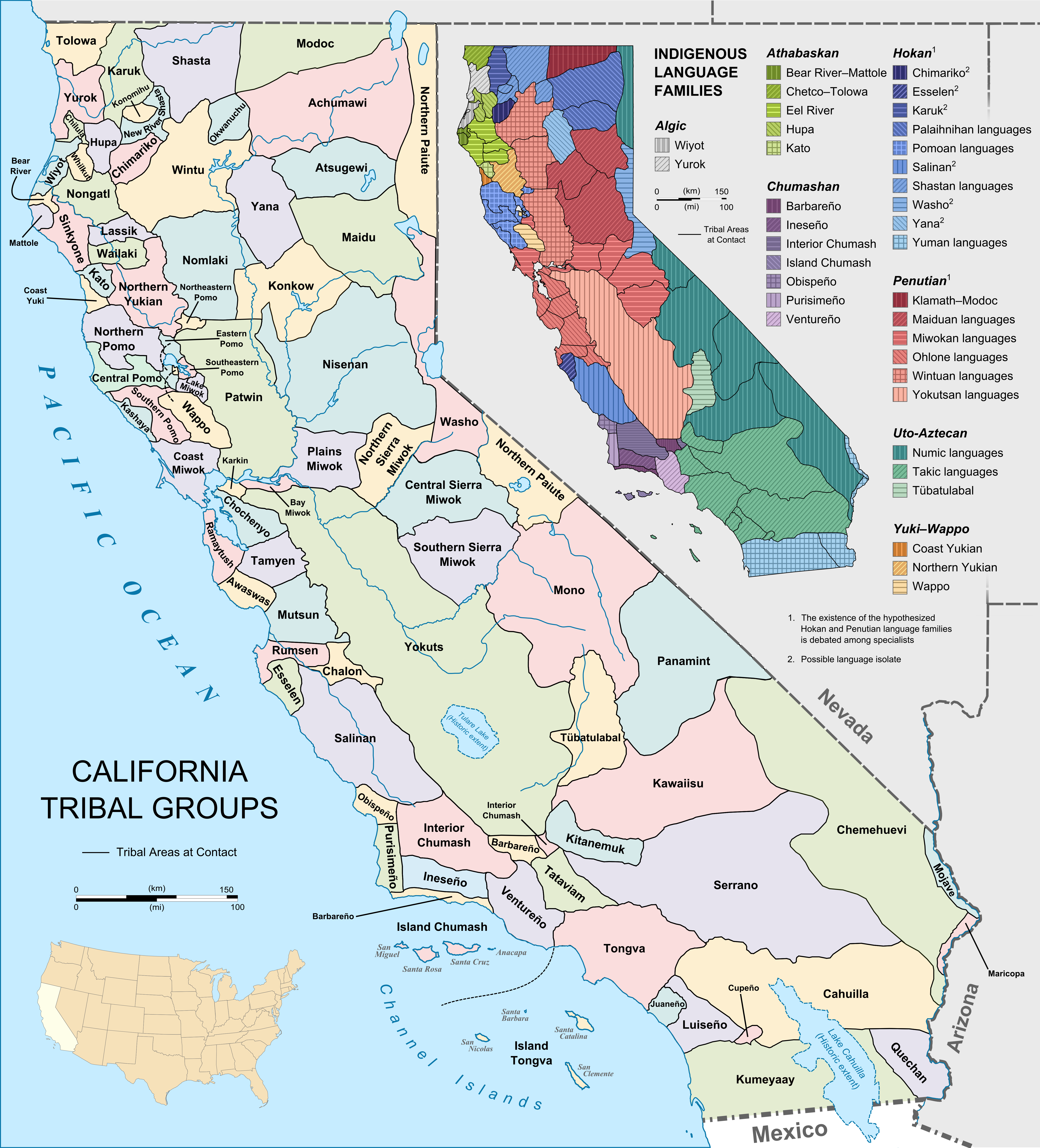
2013 UC Berkeley – Tribes and Languages at contact

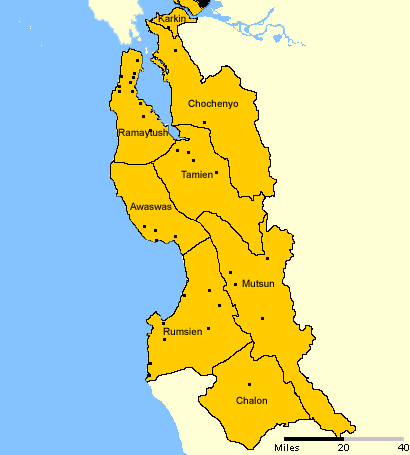
Map of the Costanoan languages and major villages.

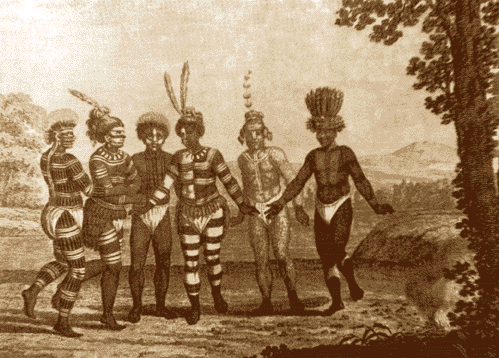
Ohlone People by Louis Choris, 1816

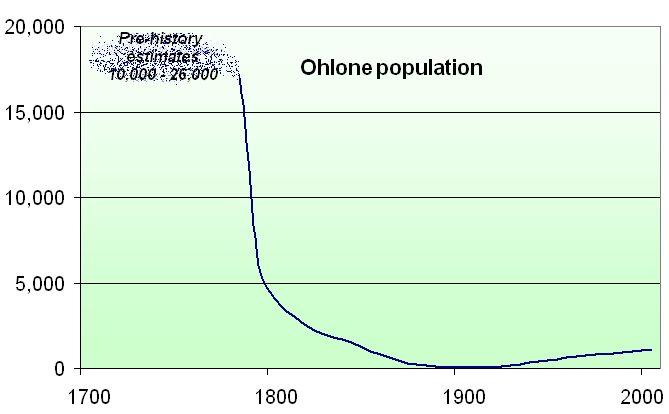
Ohlone People – Historic Population

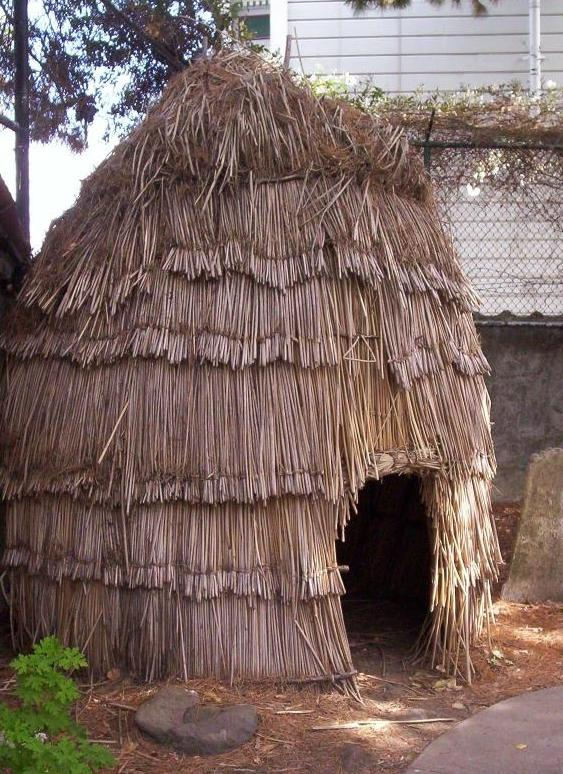
Ohlone Hut – Mission Dolores San Francisco

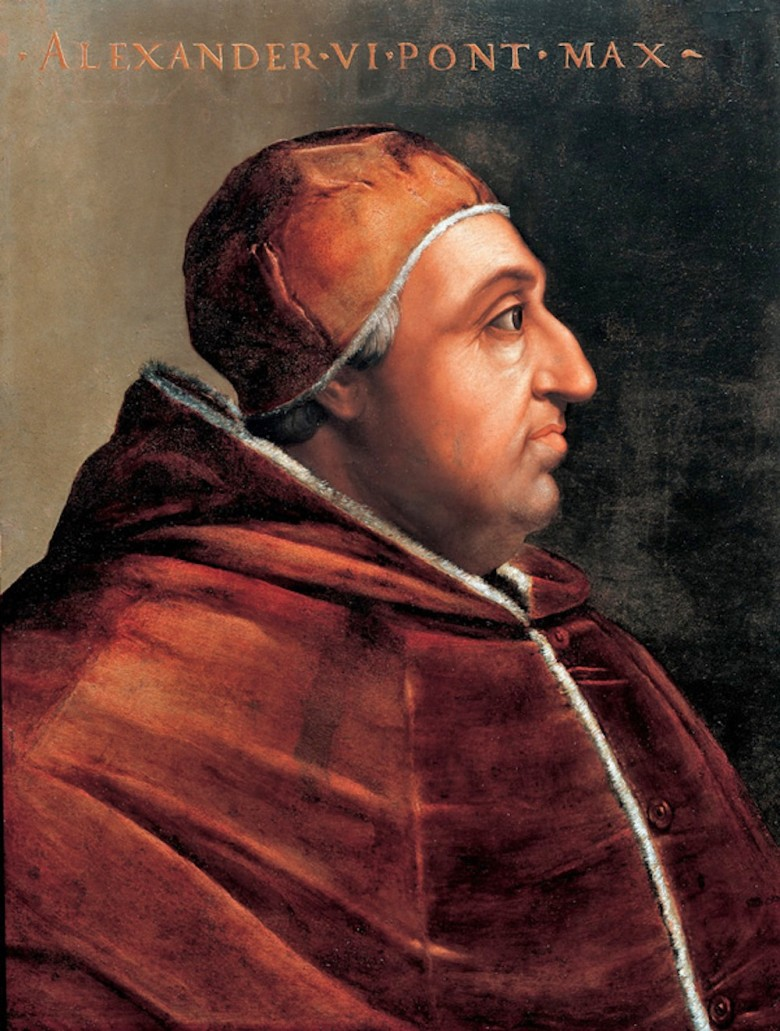
Pope Alexander VI's Inter caetera Papal Bull established the rationale for the Discovery Doctrine.

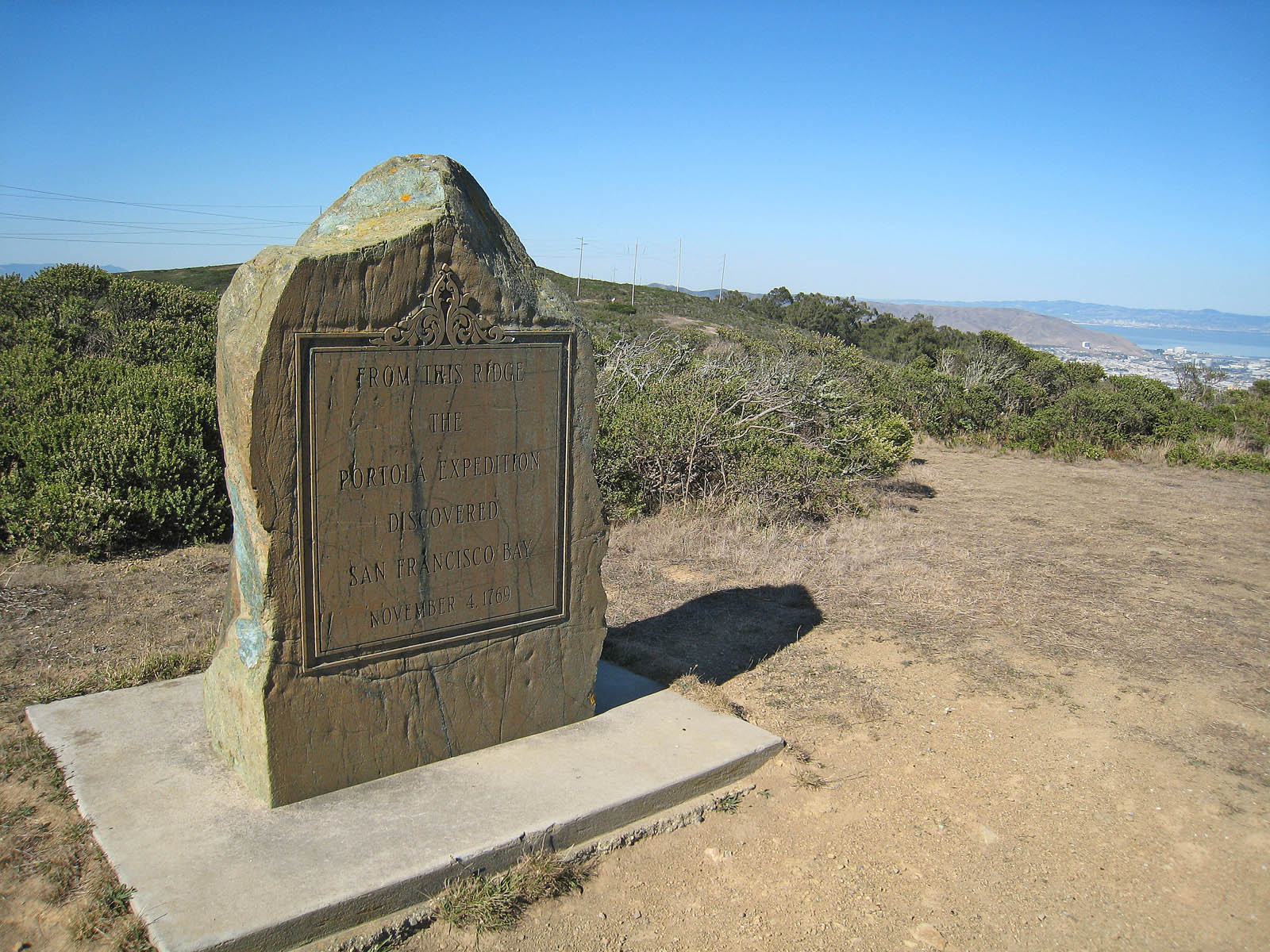
1769:Sweeney Ridge – First view of San Francisco Bay by Portolá expedition

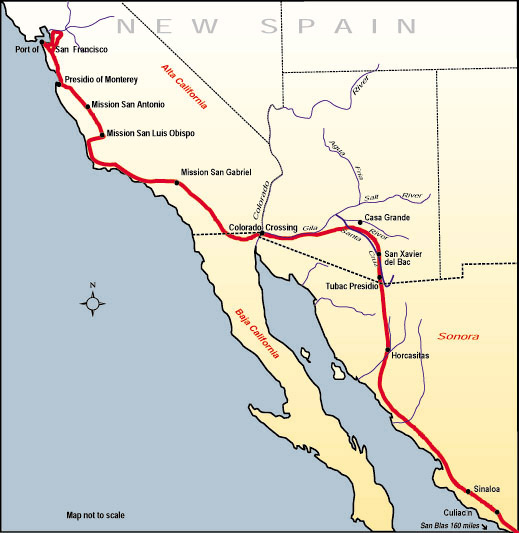
Juan Bautista de Anza's 1776 Expedition Route to found Presideo and Mission San Francisco de Asis.

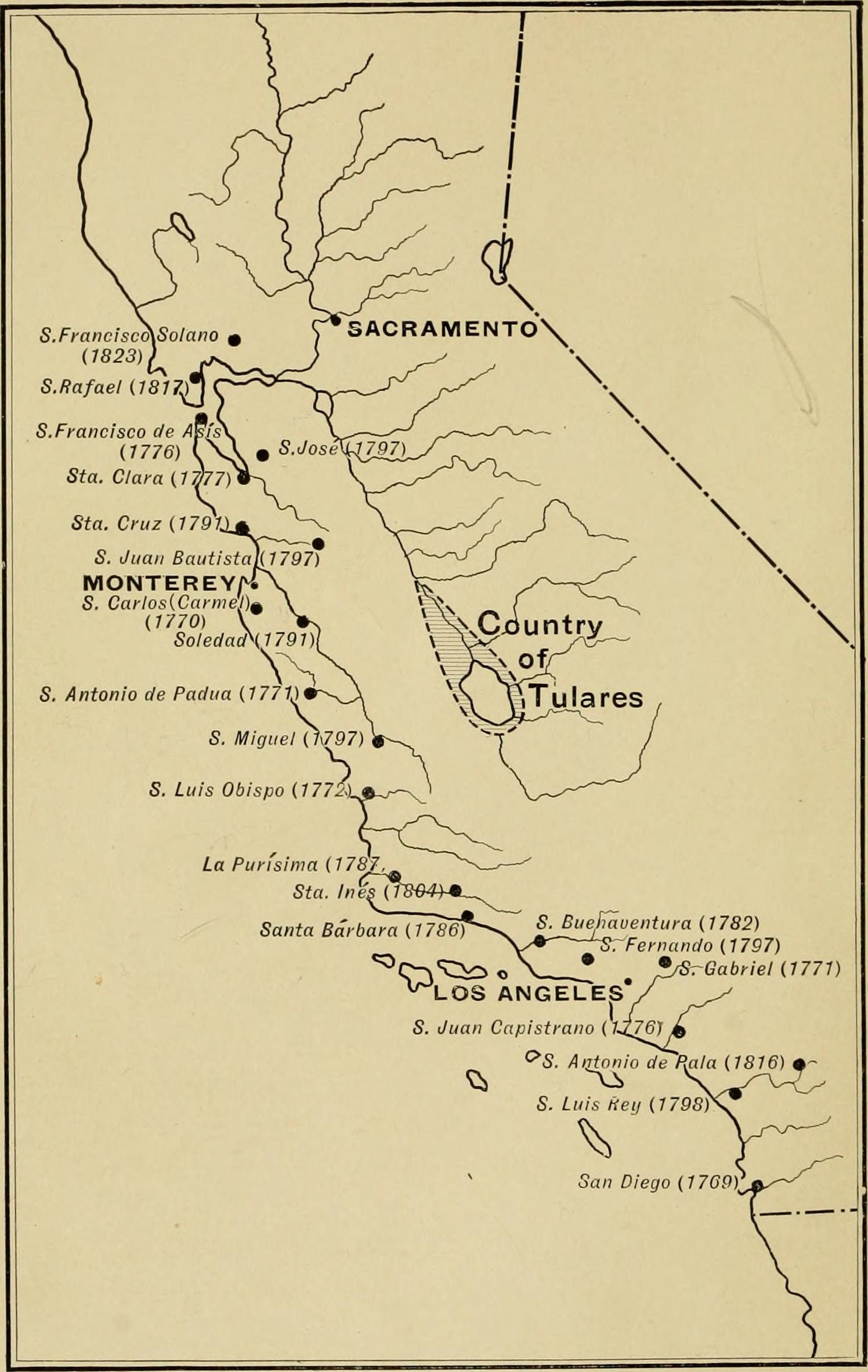
California Missions

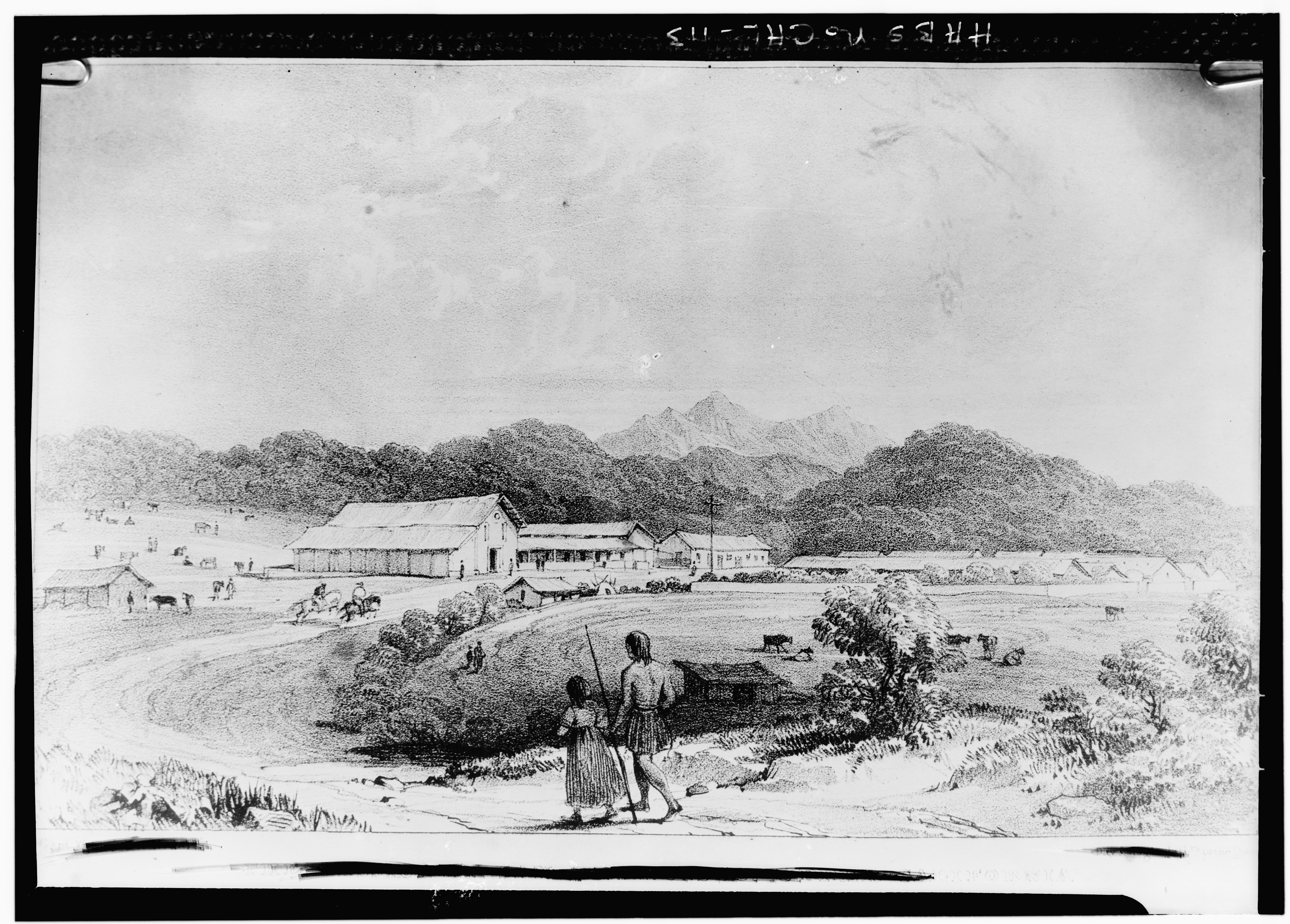
Mission San Francisco de Asis about 1816 Louis By CHORIS -

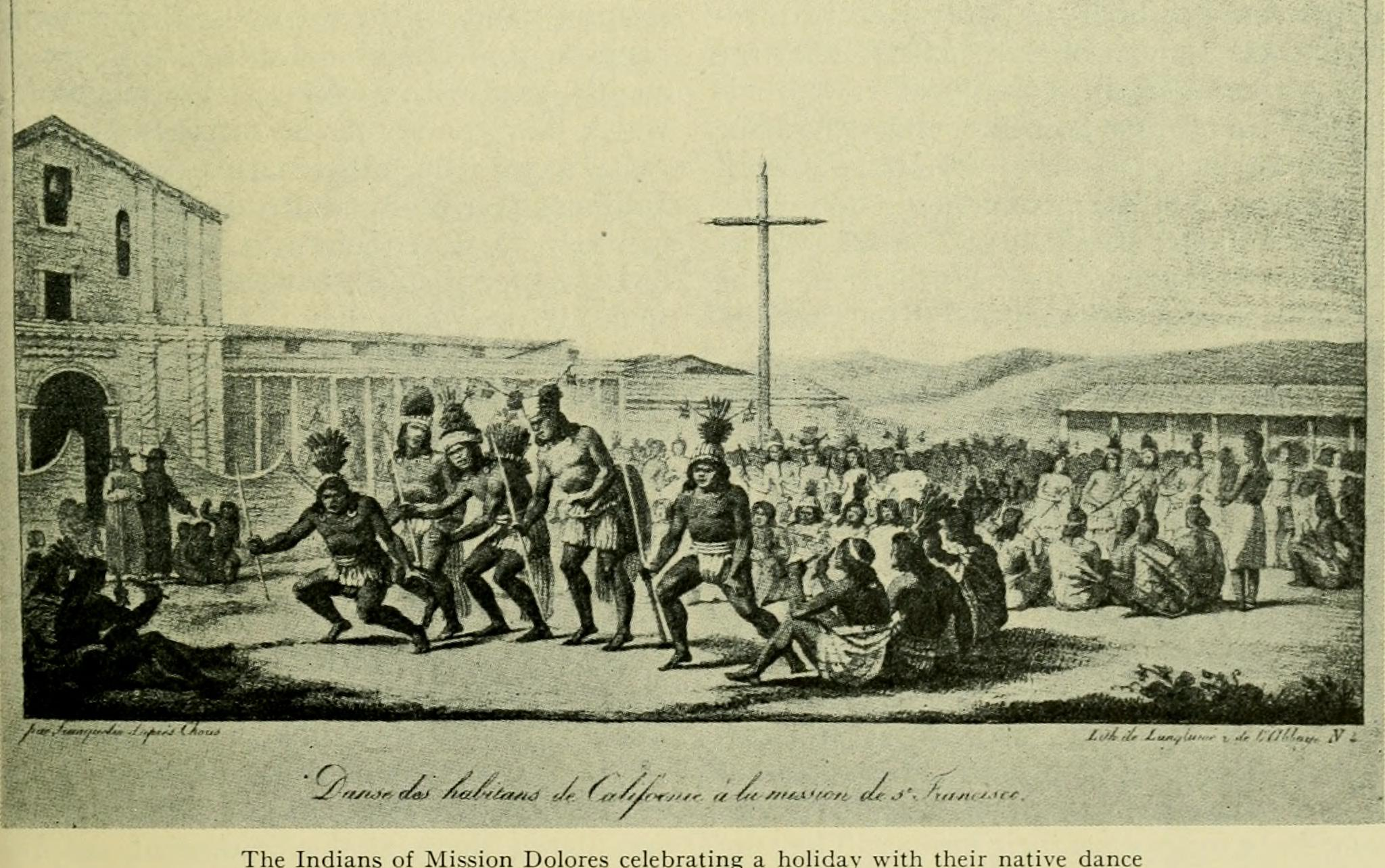
print of Louis Choris' 1816 original color painting – Ohlone ceremony at Mission San Francisco de Asis

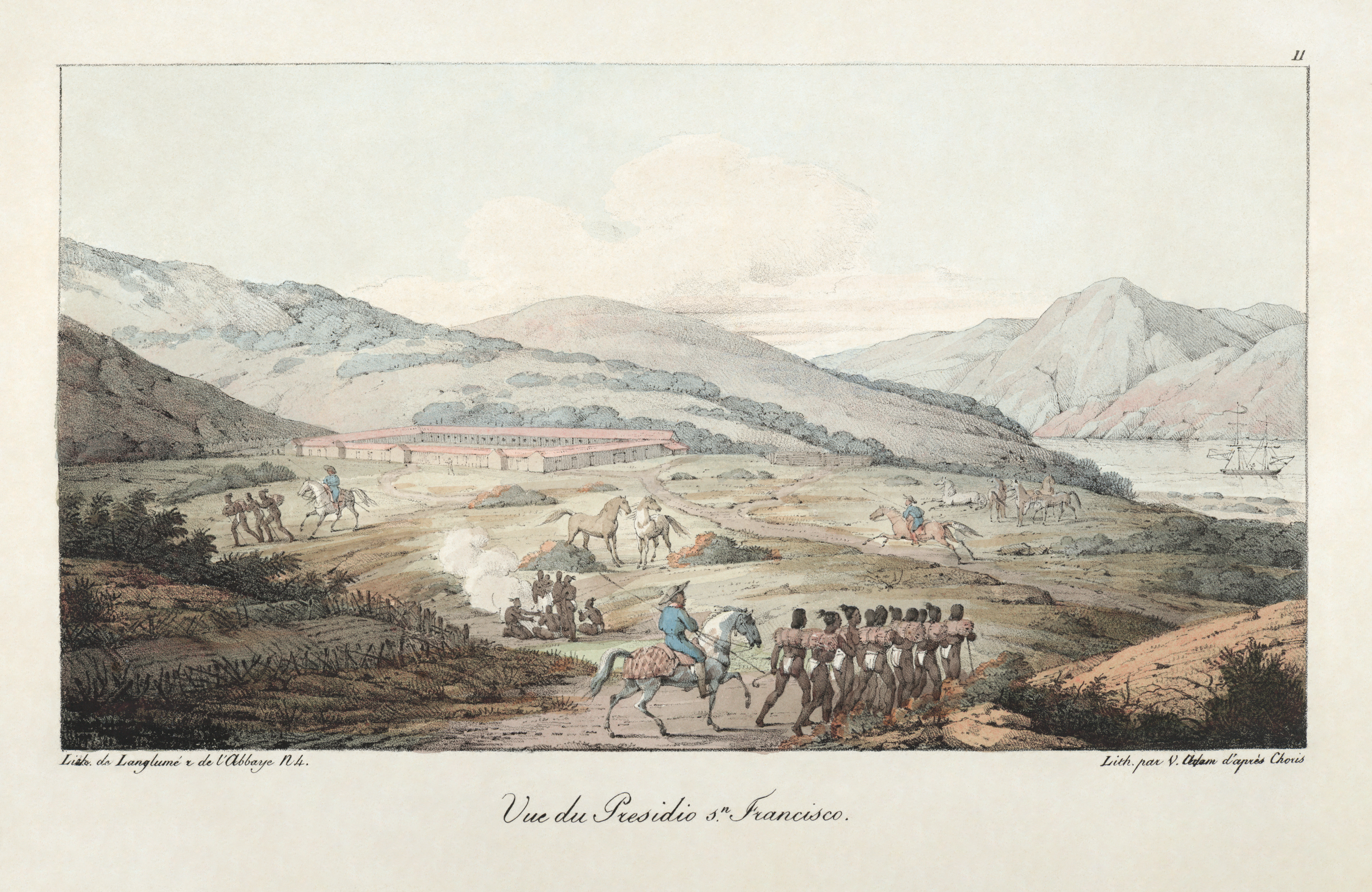
Presideo painting by Louis Choris 1817

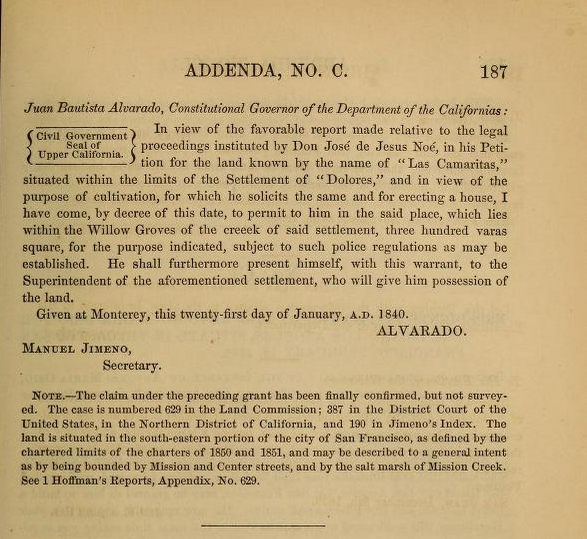
January 21, 1840: Governor Alvarado confirmation of Las Camaritas

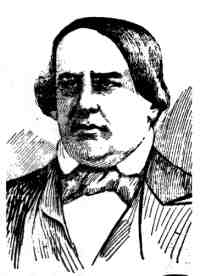
Jose de Jesus Noe – former two time Alcalde of Mission San Francisco de Asis and owner of Las Camaritas

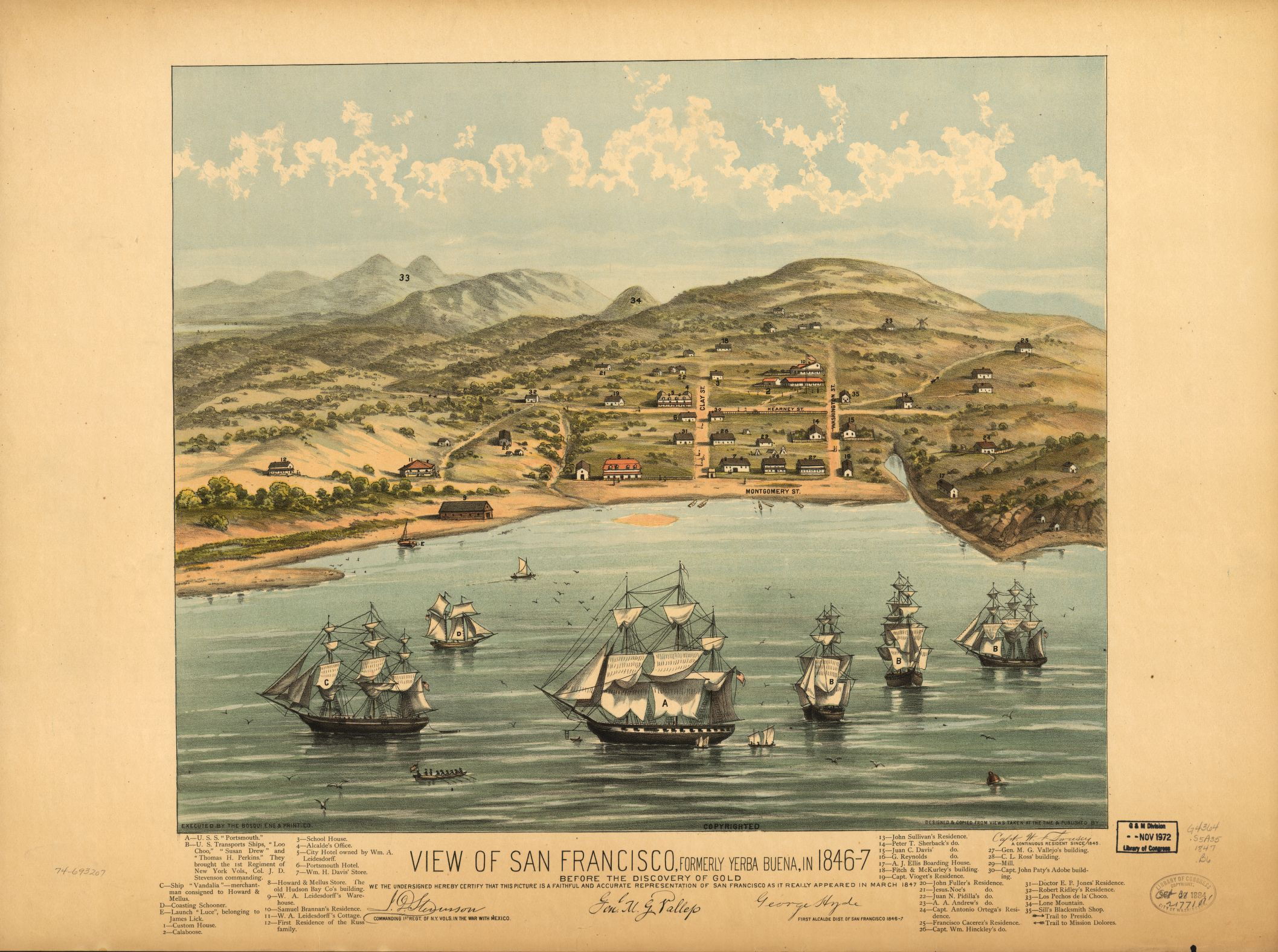
1846: Yerba Buena – Includes location of Jose Noe's house

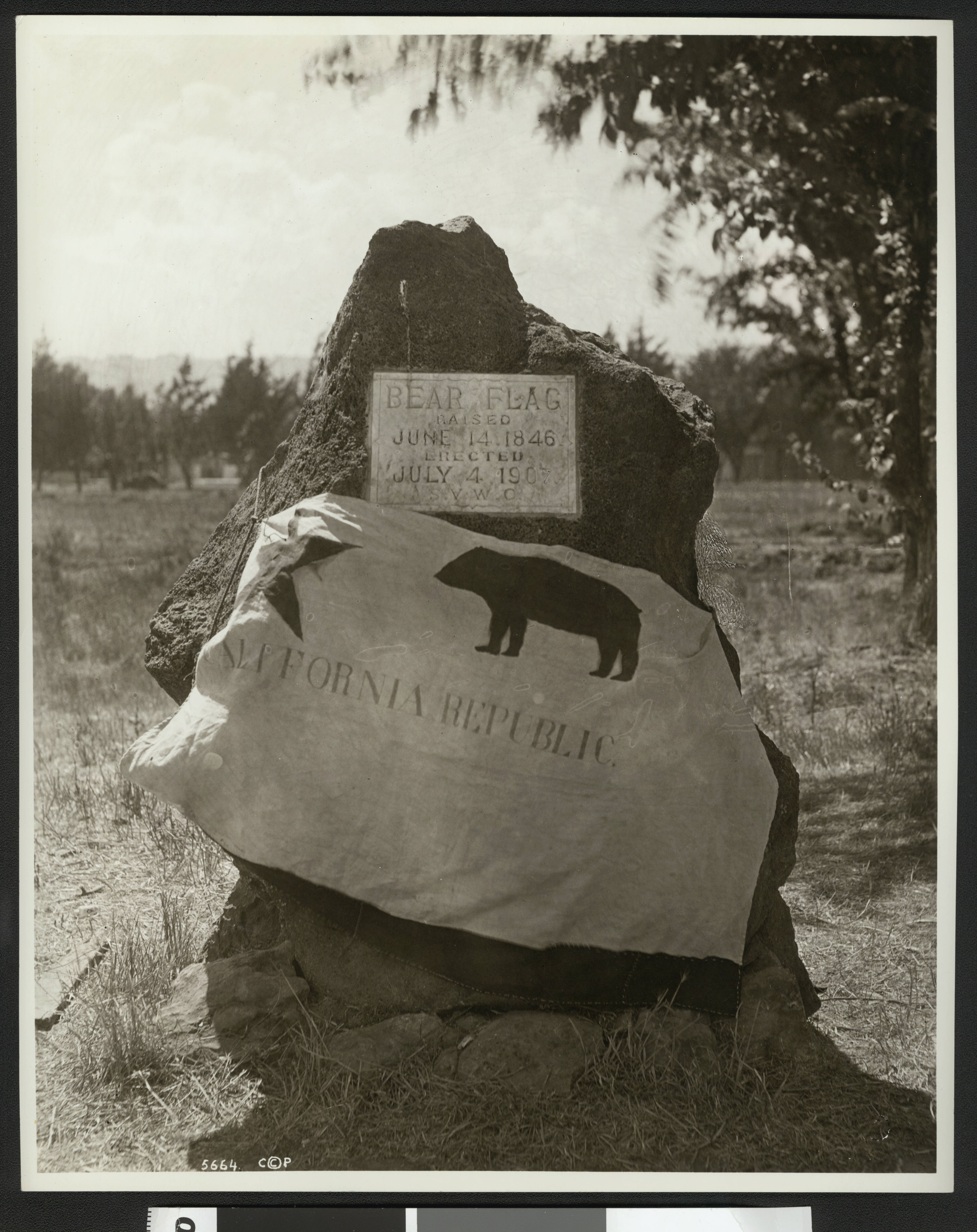
ca.1915: Bear Flag and Monument Sonoma county

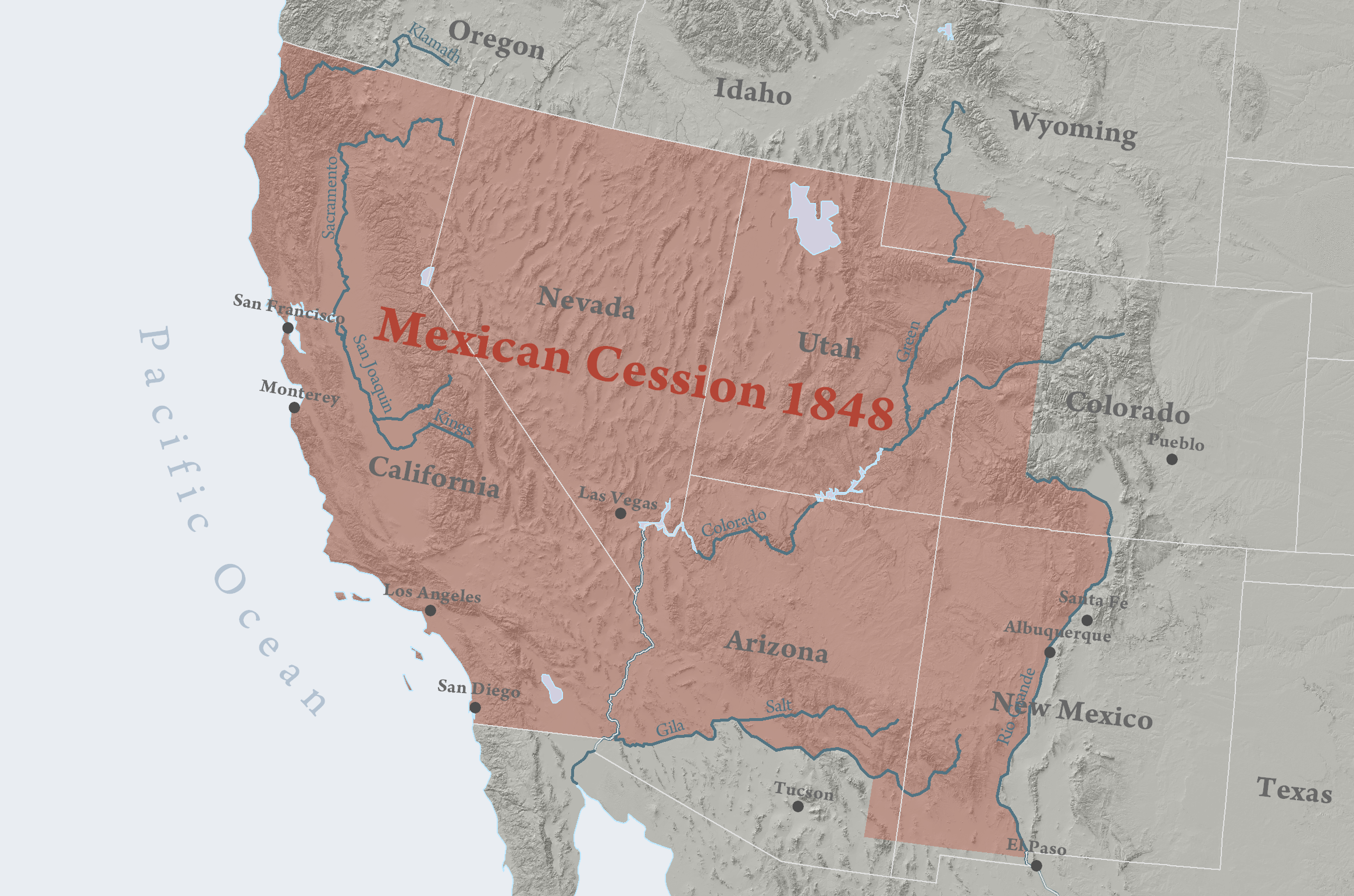
1846 Mexican cession of Southwest

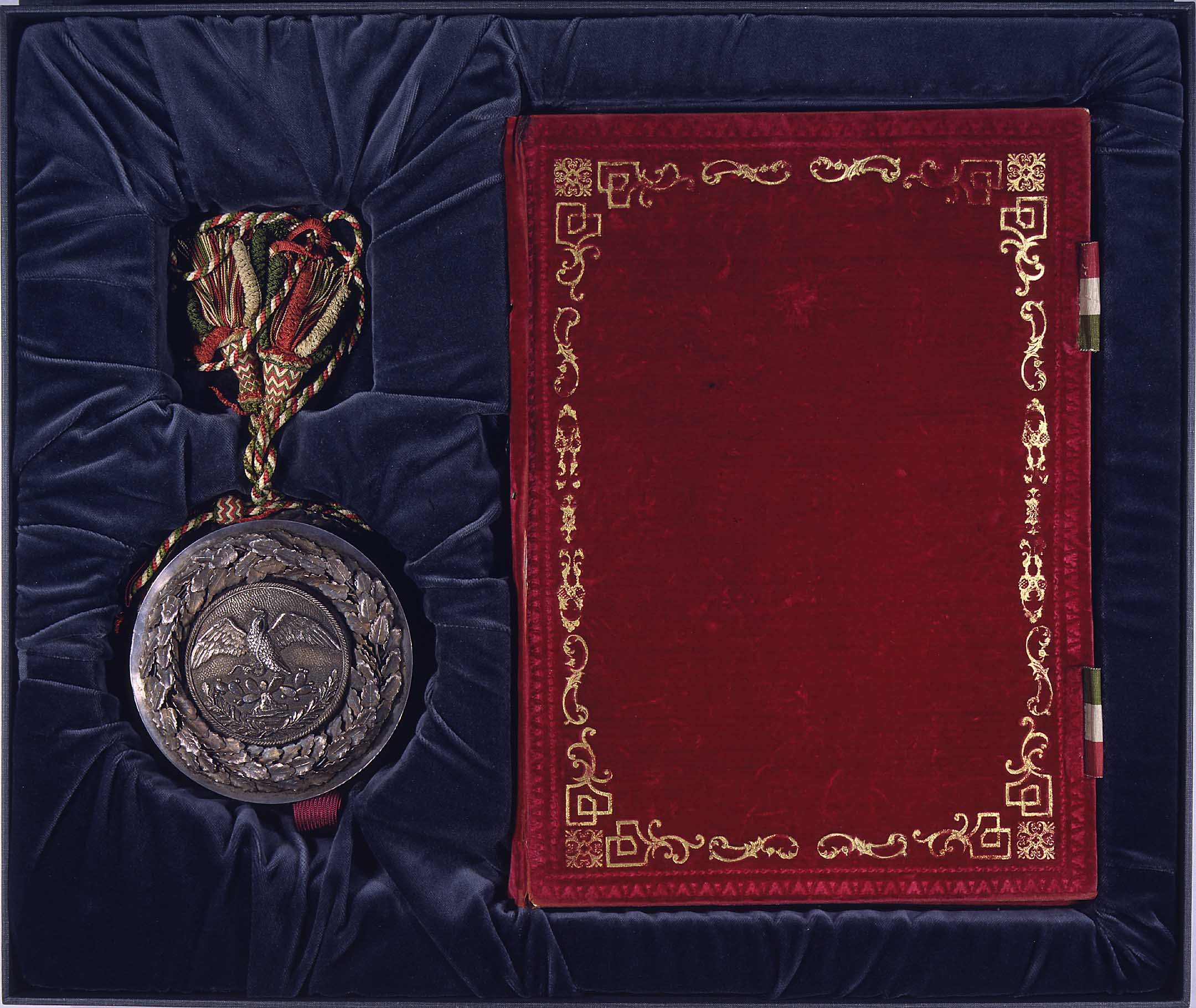
1848 Guadalupe Hidalgo Treaty Cover

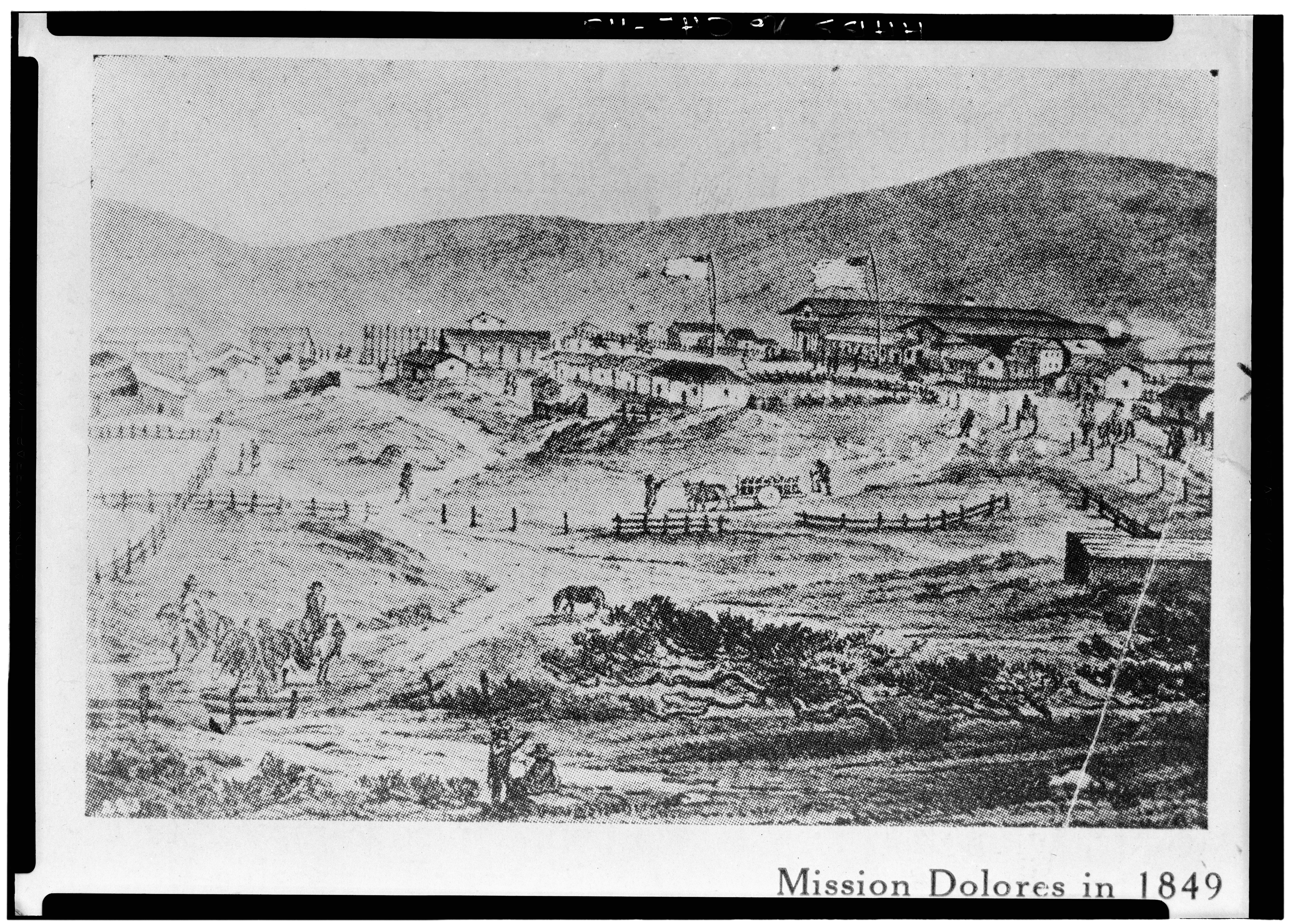
1849: Mission San Francisco de Asis

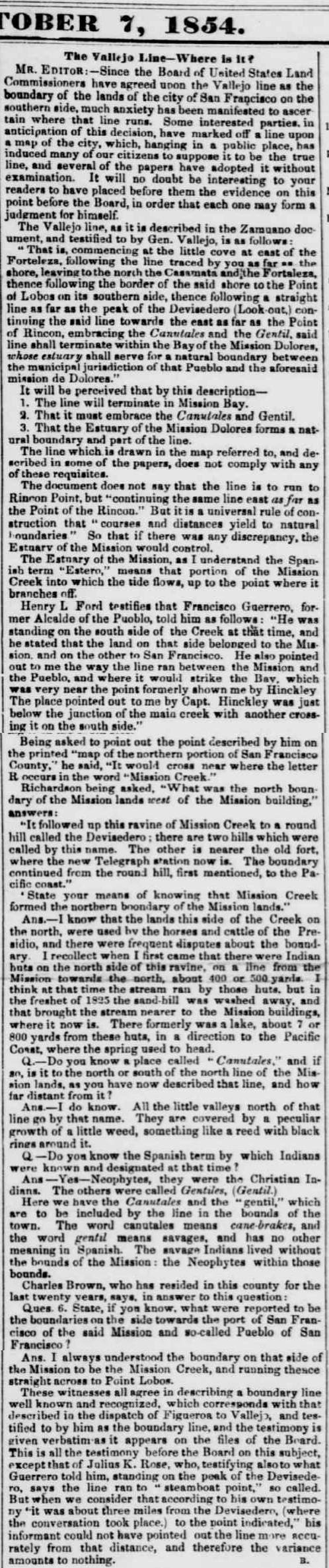
1854 Newspaper describing the border between SF and Mission

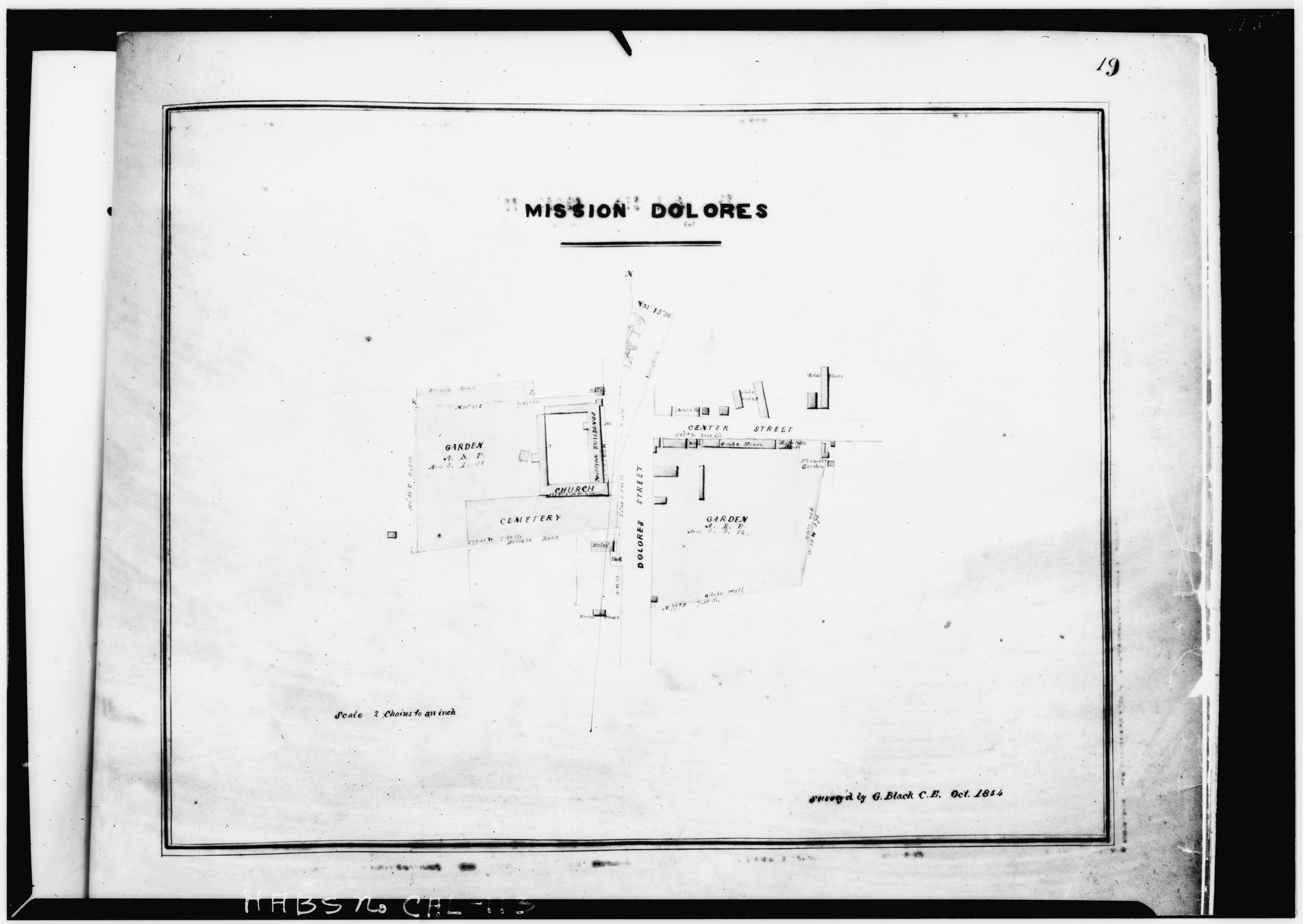
1854 U.S. Land Commission Mission: Dolores Land Grant

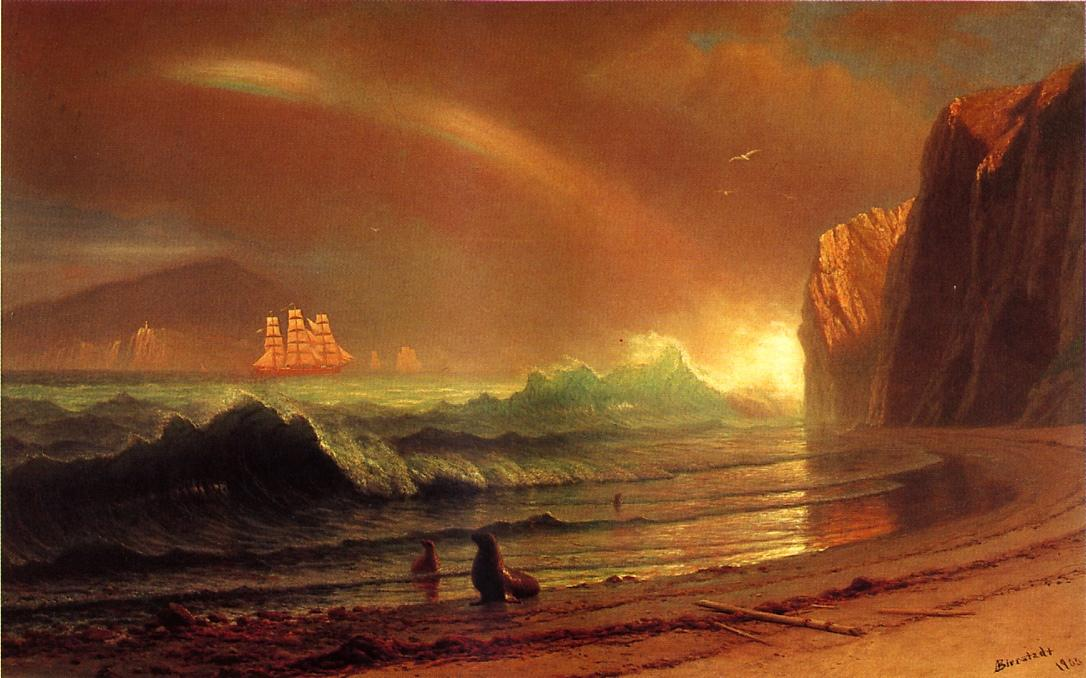
The Golden Gate by Albert Bierstadt

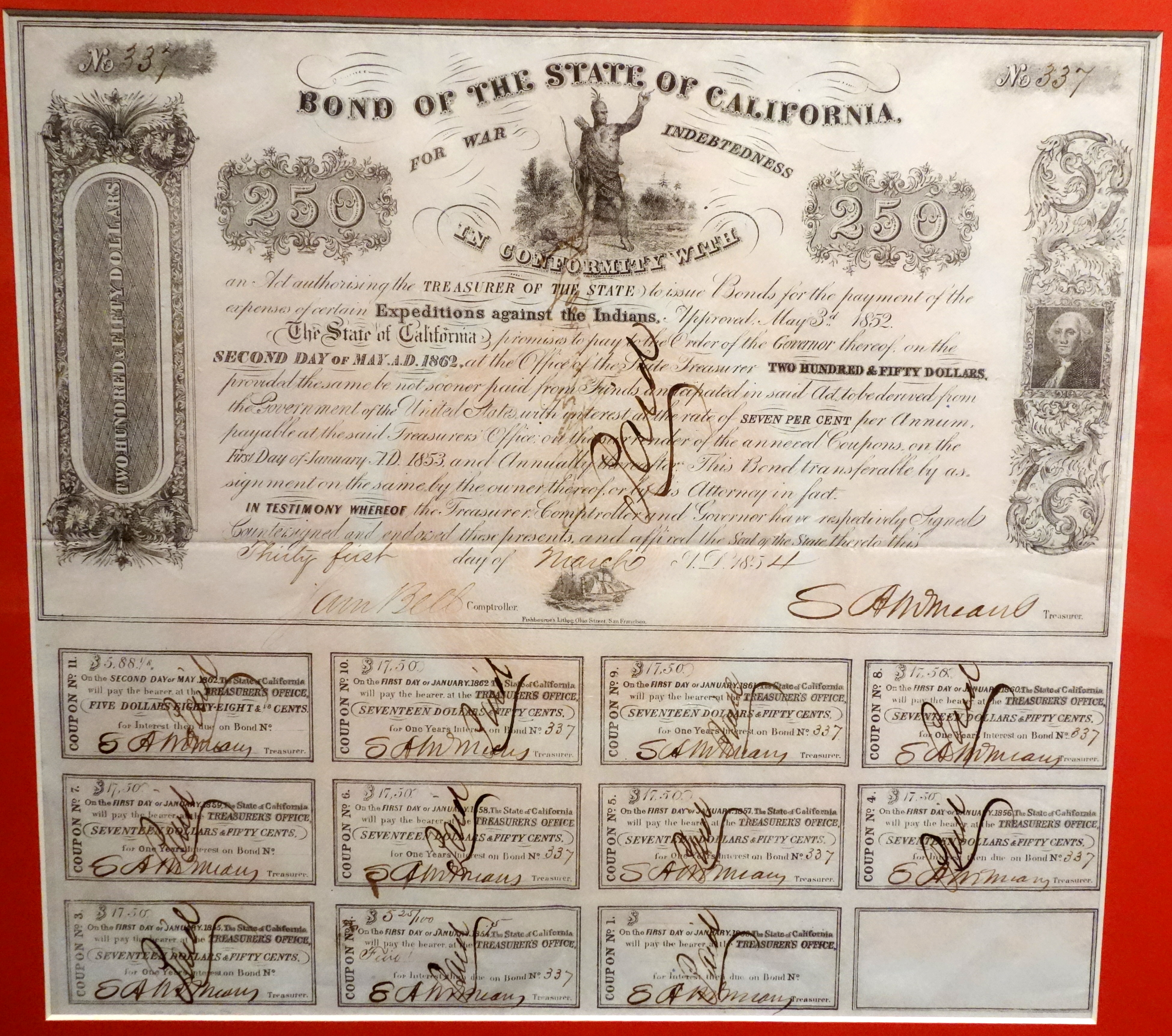
1854 California Militia bond to hunt & Kill Indians – Oakland Museum

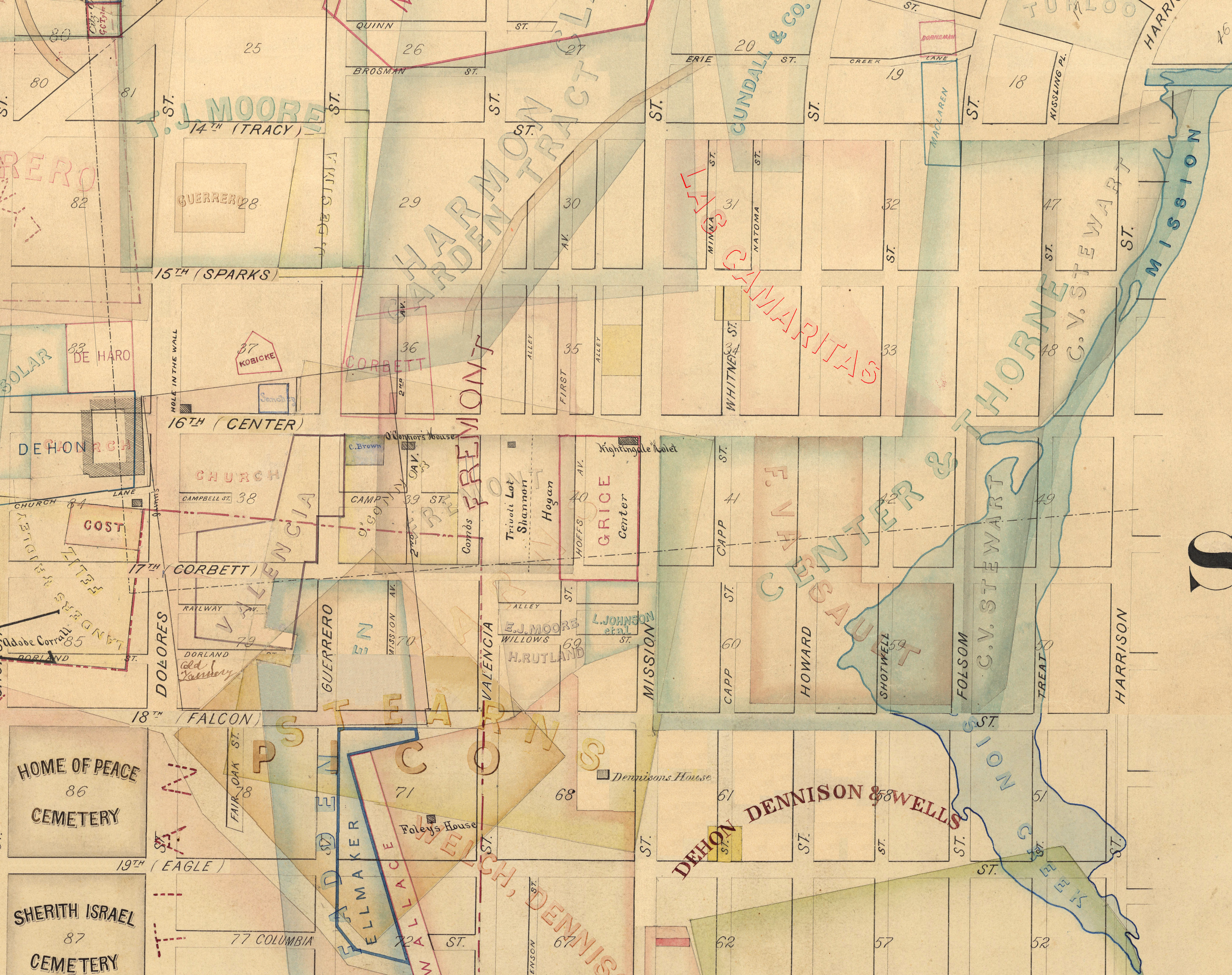
1858 Map – San Francisco Mission District – Las Camaritas

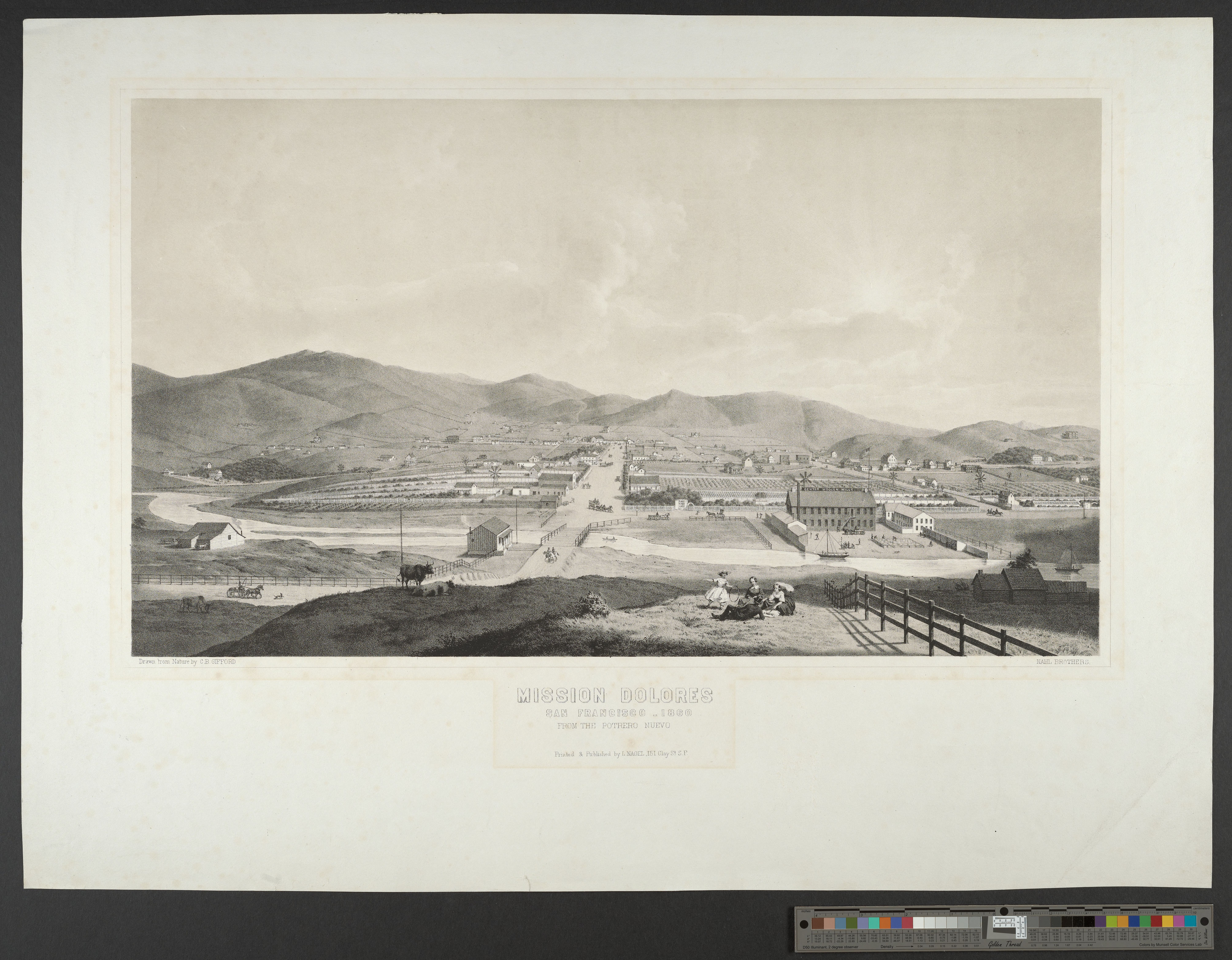
1860 Mission District by Charles Gifford – shows Noah's Garden just above Center Woolen Mill

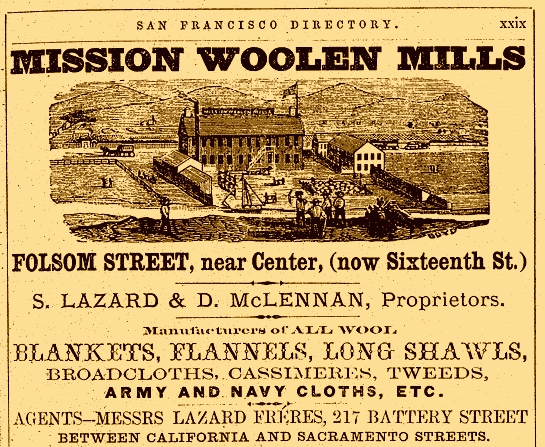
Advertisement showing Mission Woolen Mills located in the city of San Francisco in the year 1863.

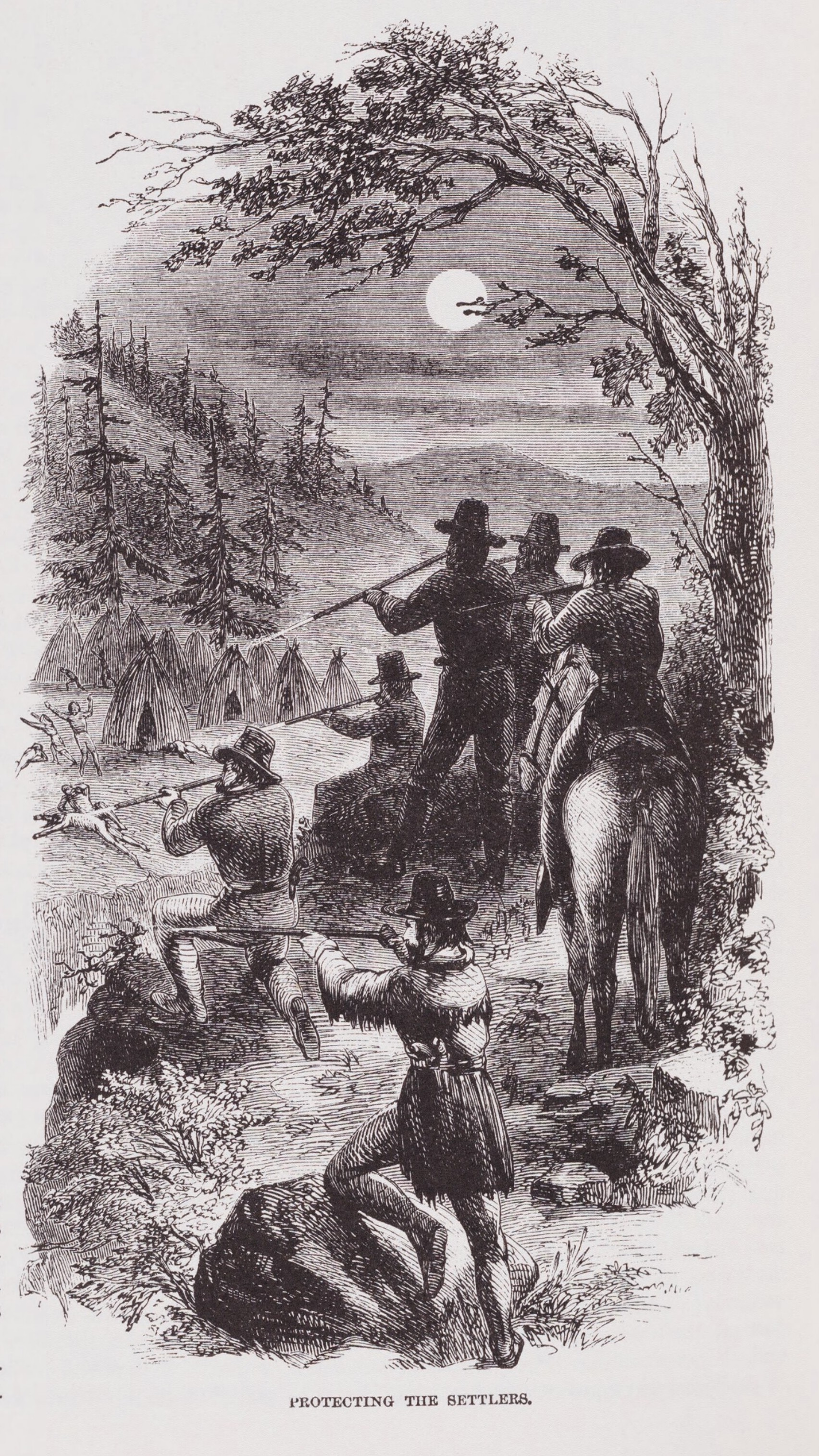
1864 – Protecting the Settlers

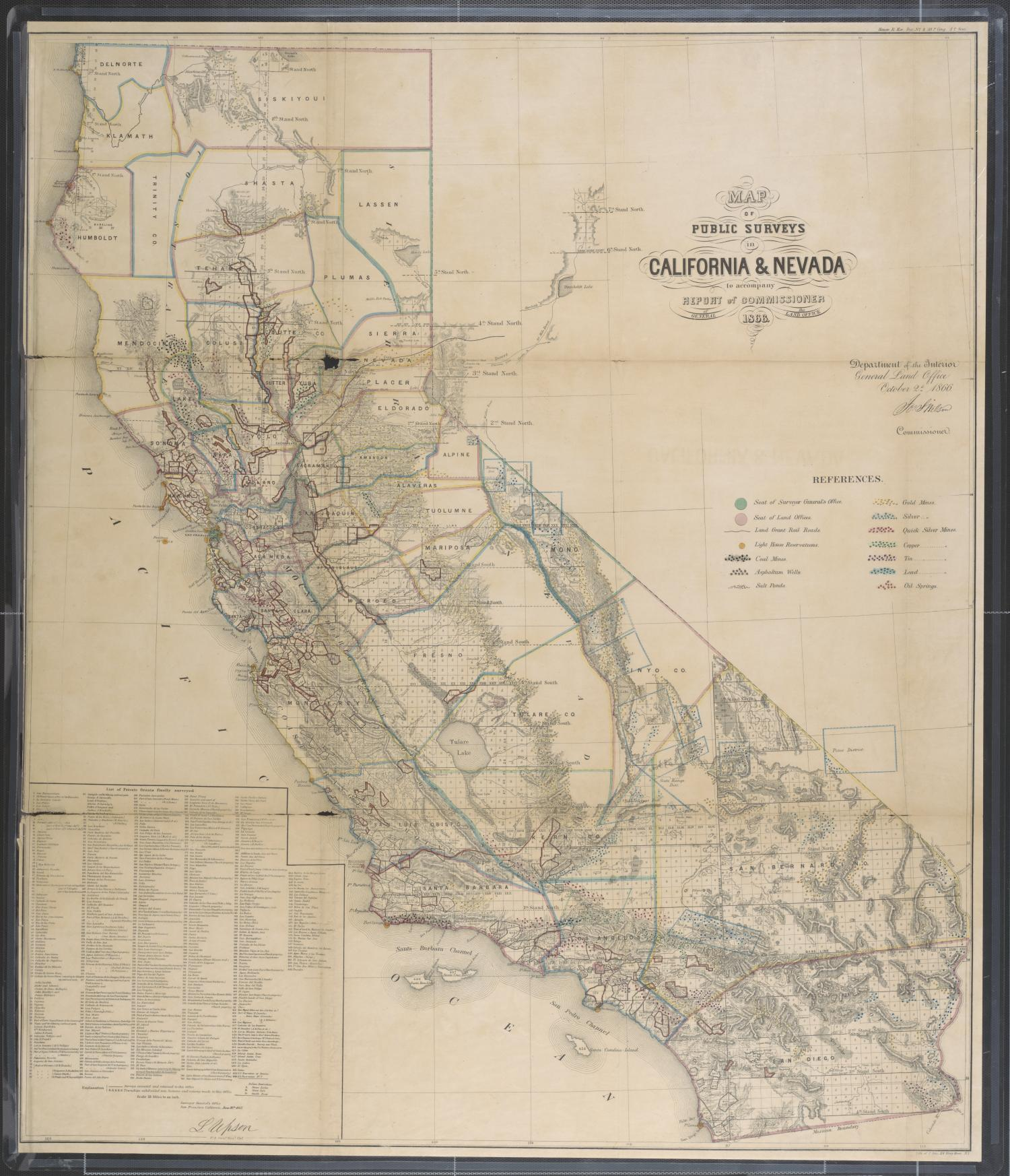
1866 Map of California Land Grants

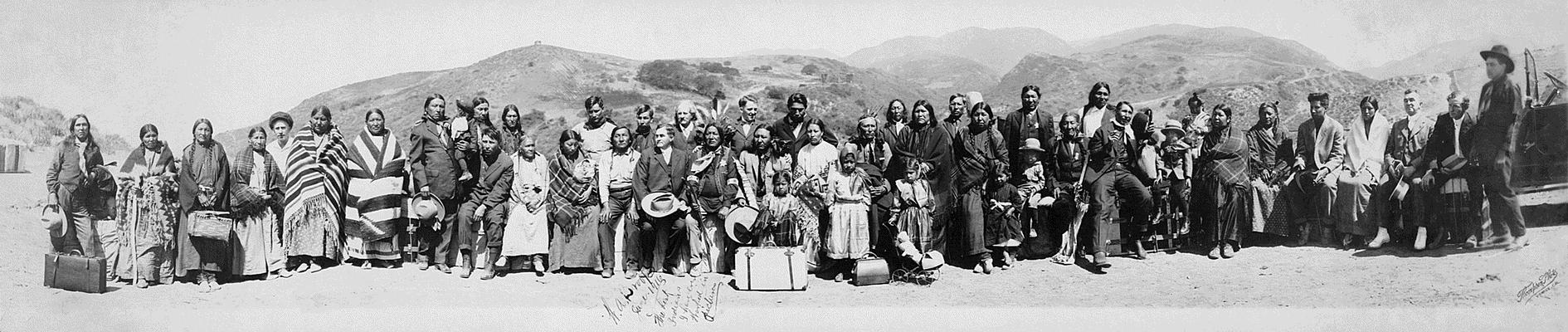
Bureau of Indian Affairs Library – California Tribal People by H. A. Brooks. June 1916

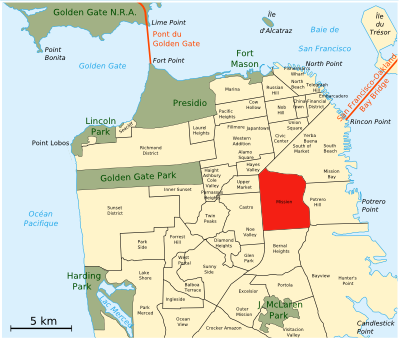
San Francisco with Mission District in red

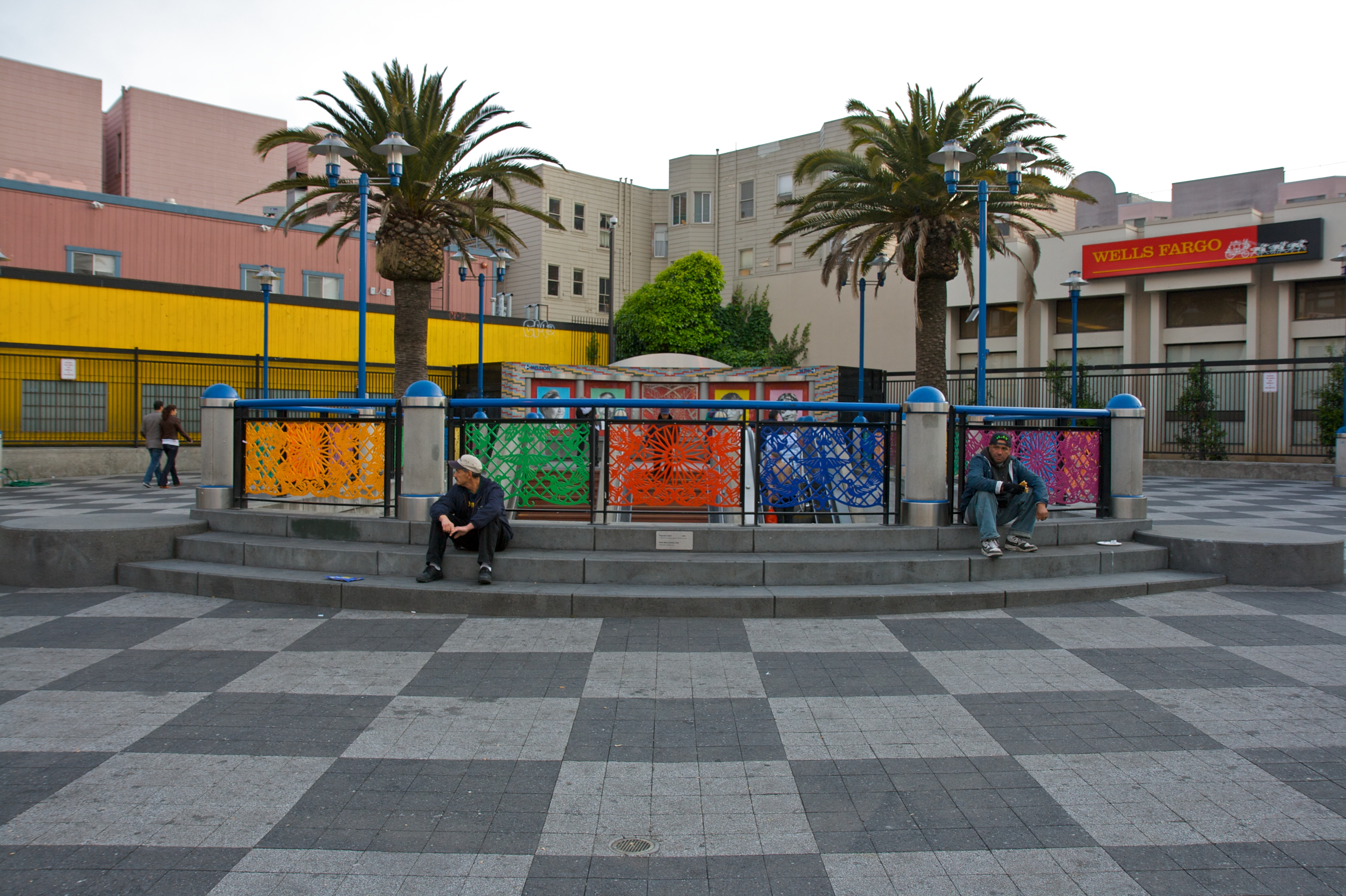
BART Plaza – 16th Street

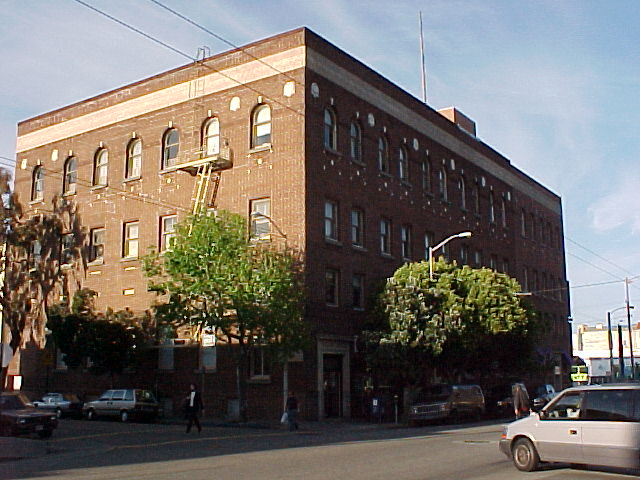
The San Francisco Labor Temple known today as the Redstone Building

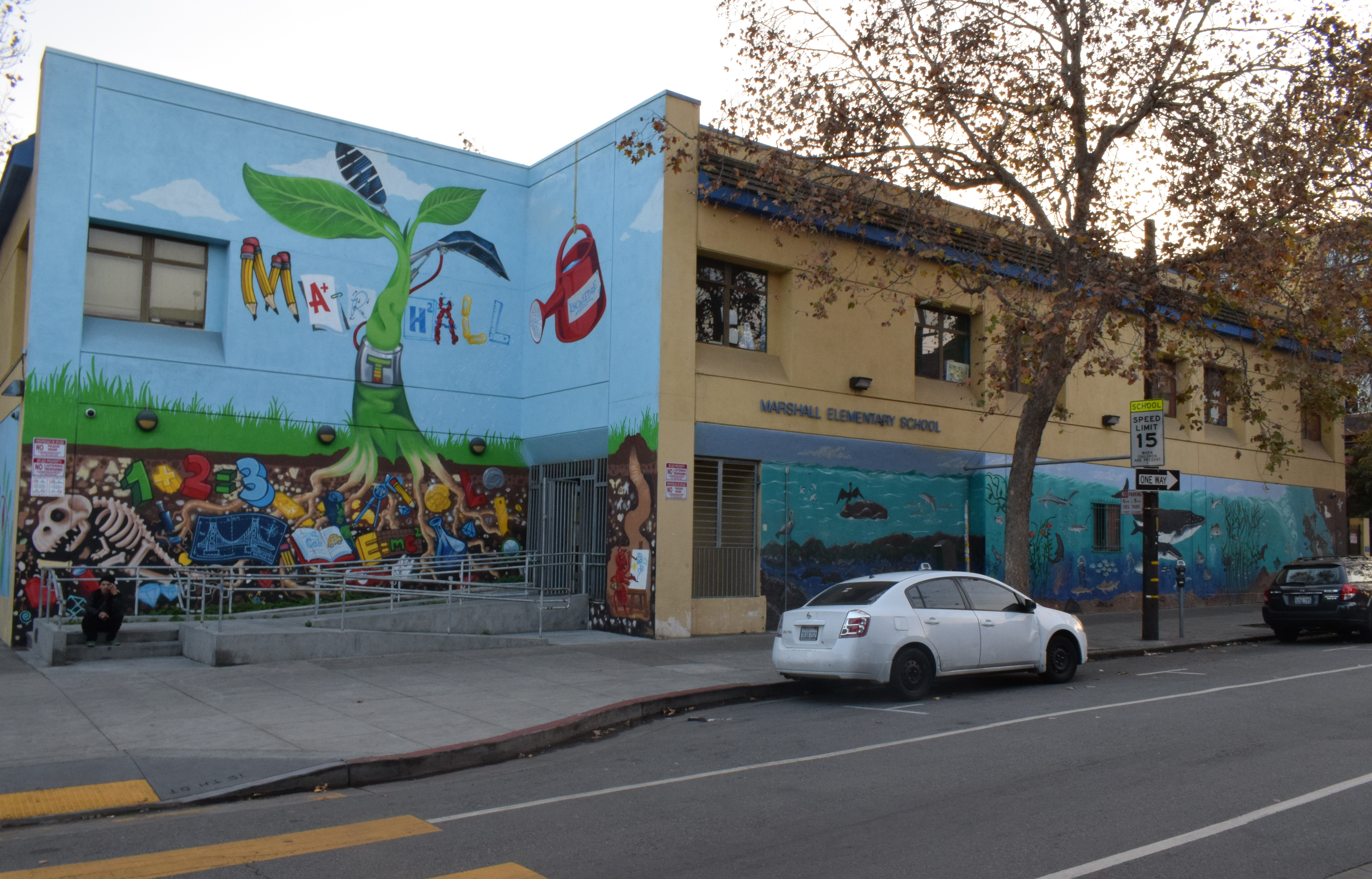
Marshall Elementary School – Capp and 15th Street San Francisco Mission District

== See also ==
- Indigenous peoples of California
- Ranchos of California
- Spanish missions in California
- Californio
- Greaser Act
- California Indian Wars
- California Genocide
- History of enslavement of indigenous peoples in California
- History of California before 1900
- United States Court of Private Land Claims
- Tribal sovereignty in the United States
- History of San Francisco
- Conquest of California
- Aboriginal title in California
- Tribal sovereignty in the United States
- U.S. recognition process
- List of federally recognized tribes by state § California
