= Rancho Muniz =

Mexican land grant in present-day California

Coordinates: 38.48°N 123.15°W

Rancho Muniz (also called "Maniz") was a 17,761-acre (71.88 km^{2}) Mexican land grant in present-day Sonoma County, California given in 1845 by Governor Pío Pico to Manuel Torres. The grant extended along the Pacific coast from Salt Point State Park on the north to the Russian River on the south. The grant included Fort Ross.

== History ==
The Mexican government, which had been concerned about the Russian presence at Fort Ross, was happy to see them leave in 1841, but less pleased when the Russian-American Company sold it to John Sutter. The position of the Mexican government had been that neither land nor improvements had ever belonged to the Russians and hence they could not legally be transferred to anyone else. Within two years after the purchase of Fort Ross, everything Sutter considered salvageable had been removed to his Rancho New Helvetia. In 1843, William (Wilhelm) Benitz, from Baden, Germany, became manager of Sutter's Fort Ross holdings. In 1844 Sutter leased the land to Benitz and a partner, Ernest Rufus, from Württemberg. Both Benitz and Rufus had been in Sutter's militia. That transaction again brought into question the validity of Sutter's title to the property, and Governor Manuel Micheltorena granted Rancho Bodega in part of the southern half of the former Russian claim to Captain Stephen Smith in 1844, and Governor Pio Pico granted the coastal four square league Rancho Muniz in the northern half of the former Russian claim to Manuel Torres in 1845.

Manuel Torres (1826–1910) was born in Lima, Peru, and came to California in 1843 on a merchant ship with his brother-in-law, Captain Stephen Smith who was married to his sister, Manuela Garcia Torres. Torres married Mariana (Maryanna) Richardson the daughter of William A. Richardson. Manuel Torres leased Rancho Muniz to Benitz and Rufus, who also owned Rancho German on the Muniz’ northern border, and in 1849, he sold the entire rancho to them. Manuel Torres later operated the Estudillo House in San Leandro, and also the Marin Hotel in San Rafael. Torres was elected to the California State Assembly in 1858-9.

With the cession of California to the United States following the Mexican-American War, the 1848 Treaty of Guadalupe Hidalgo provided that the land grants would be honored. As required by the Land Act of 1851, a claim for Rancho Muniz was filed with the Public Land Commission in 1852, and the grant was patented to Manuel Torres in 1860.

Benitz and Rufus now owned approximately two thirds of the Sonoma County coastline, from the Gualala River in the north to the Russian River in the south. Rufus left the partnership in June, 1849. William Benitz took another partner, German immigrant, Charles Theodore Meyer. In 1867, John Rule bought 4,000 acres (16.2 km^{2}) in the southern half of the rancho. In 1874, Benitz sold all of his property and emigrated to Argentina.
