= Rancho Blucher =

Mexican land grant in California

Coordinates: 38.310°N 122.920°W

Rancho Blucher was a 26,759-acre (108.29 km^{2}) Mexican land grant in present day Marin and Sonoma County, California given in 1844 by Governor Manuel Micheltorena to Jean Jacques Vioget. The rancho is named for the Prussian field marshal Gebhard Leberecht von Blücher. The grant extended along the coast from Estero Americano on the north and to Estero de San Antonio on the south.

== History ==
Jean Jacques Vioget was a Swiss sailor and surveyor, who came to California in 1837. He made the first survey and map of Yerba Buena (which later was named San Francisco) in 1839. He worked for John Sutter. After applying to Governor Juan B. Alvarado for a tract of land in northern Marin, Vioget received a provisional grant in 1842. Governor Micheltorena awarded Vioget full rights to Rancho Blucher in 1844. After his marriage to Maria Benarides de Vasques in 1847, Vioget sold Rancho Blucher to Captain Stephen Smith, grantee of Rancho Bodega directly to the north.

With the cession of California to the United States following the Mexican-American War, the 1848 Treaty of Guadalupe Hidalgo provided that the land grants would be honored. As required by the Land Act of 1851, a claim for Rancho Blucher was filed with the Public Land Commission in 1852, and the grant was patented to Stephen Smith in 1858.

When Captain Smith died in San Francisco in 1855, he owned the six-square league Rancho Blucher and, with his wife, Manuela Torres, the eight-square league Rancho Bodega. Smith had three children (Stephen Manual Smith, Manuelita Garcia Smith, and James B. Smith) by Manuela Torres. During this time, Smith had two children by Tsupu, one named William Smith. Stephan Smith had four children (Stephen Henry Smith, Giles Smith, Ellen Morrisson and Elvira Pond) by a former marriage.
