= Rancho German =

Coordinates: 38.68°N 123.40°W

Rancho German (also called "Rancho de Hermann" or "Rancho de Ross") was a 17,580-acre (71.1 km^{2}) Mexican land grant in present day Sonoma County, California given in 1846 by Governor Pío Pico to Ernest Rufus. Rufus named the ranch after Hermann, the German hero who defeated the Roman legions in the Battle of the Teutoburg Forest at the time of the Emperor Augustus. Herman, in Spanish, would be written "German". The name "Rancho de Hermann" appears on the diseno, but the expediente has "German". The grant extended along the Pacific coast from the Gualala River on the north to Salt Point State Park on the south, and included present day Gualala, Sea Ranch and Stewart's Point.

== History ==
The Mexican government, which had been concerned about the Russian presence at Fort Ross, was happy to see them leave in 1841, but less pleased when the Russian-American Company sold it to John Sutter. The position of the Mexican government had been that neither land nor improvements had ever belonged to the Russians and hence they could not legally be transferred to anyone else. Within two years after the purchase of Fort Ross, everything Sutter considered salvageable had been removed to his Rancho New Helvetia. In 1843, William Benitz, from Baden, Germany, became manager of Sutter's Fort Ross holdings. In 1844 Sutter leased the land to Benitz and a partner, Ernest Rufus, from Württemberg. Both Benitz and Rufus had been officers in Sutter's militia. That transaction again brought into question the validity of Sutter's title to the property.

In 1845 Wilhelm Benitz and Ernest Rufus petitioned the Mexican governor Pío Pico for a grant of five square leagues. Before the award of the land grant, Rufus invited German immigrants Frederick Hügal and Henry Haeger to assist him in developing the grant. Rufus, a naturalized Mexican citizen, went to Los Angeles to petition for the land, which in 1846 was granted to Rufus in his name alone. At that time, the Mexican authorities did not like making grants to multiple owners. Rufus gave one and a quarter square leagues each to Hügal and Haeger, leaving one and a quarter square leagues each to Benitz and Rufus.

In 1849, Manuel Torres, grantee of Rancho Muniz on Rancho German's southern border, sold Rancho Muniz to Benitz and Rufus. Benitz and Rufus now owned approximately two thirds of the Sonoma county coastline, from the Walhalla (Gualala) river in the north to the Russian River in the south. Rufus left the partnership in June, 1849. William Benitz took another partner, Charles Theodore Meyer, also a German immigrant. In July, 1849, Benitz and Meyer bought out Hügal.

With the cession of California to the United States following the Mexican-American War, the 1848 Treaty of Guadalupe Hidalgo provided that the land grants would be honored. As required by the Land Act of 1851, a claim for Rancho German was filed with the Public Land Commission in 1852, and the grant was patented to William Benitz, Charles Meyer, Carlos F. Glein, Joshua Hendy, and Samuel M. Duncan in 1872.

Samuel Duncan and Joshua Hendy established a sawmill on the ridge behind Salt Point, in 1853. In 1855 Joshua Hendy sold his share to Alexander Duncan, brother of Samuel. Before the official survey was made, Glein, Hendy, and Duncan sold their shares of the rancho to Henry B. Platt. However the official survey area of the rancho was about four square leagues - less than the five square leagues of the original grant. This led to several lawsuits adjusting boundaries.

By 1855, German immigrants William Bihler and Charles Wagner acquired title to the northern 2 1/2 square leagues of Rancho German. Bihler bought out Wagner's interest in 1857. William Bihler (1828 -) was born in Eppingen, Baden, Germany, and emigrated, with parents, to America, settling in Baltimore. Bihler arrived in San Francisco in 1849, where he apprenticed as a butcher for a couple of years before becoming a partner in a cattle ranch operation on Rancho Huichica in western Napa County in 1852. Bihler remained at Rancho Huichica until 1859, when he purchased a ranch Lakeville.

When Bihler acquired his Rancho German property in 1855, he sent back to Baltimore for his two young nephews to join him and manage his two cattle ranches. The younger, Christian Stengel, along with Adam Knipp, would operate the Rancho German property. Beginning in the 1860s, Knipp and Stengel gradually bought 3,220-acre (13.0 km^{2}) from Bihler. Between 1872 and 1882, Robert Rutherford bought 985-acre (3.99 km^{2}) from Bihler, but lost it 13 years later to foreclosure. In 1903, Knipp and Stengel began selling off their land to Bender Brothers Mill and Lumber Co., which also acquired the Rutherford ranch. Starting in 1910, Walter P. Frick bought up parcels of the ranch and unified them as the Del Mar Ranch.

== Historic sites of the Rancho ==
- Knipp and Stengel Ranch Barn. Knipp and Stengel built the Sea Ranch barn that is now in the National Register of Historical Buildings and the California Register of Historical Resources.
