= Rancho Bodega =

Historic rancho in Sonoma County, California

Coordinates: 38.400°N 123.030°W

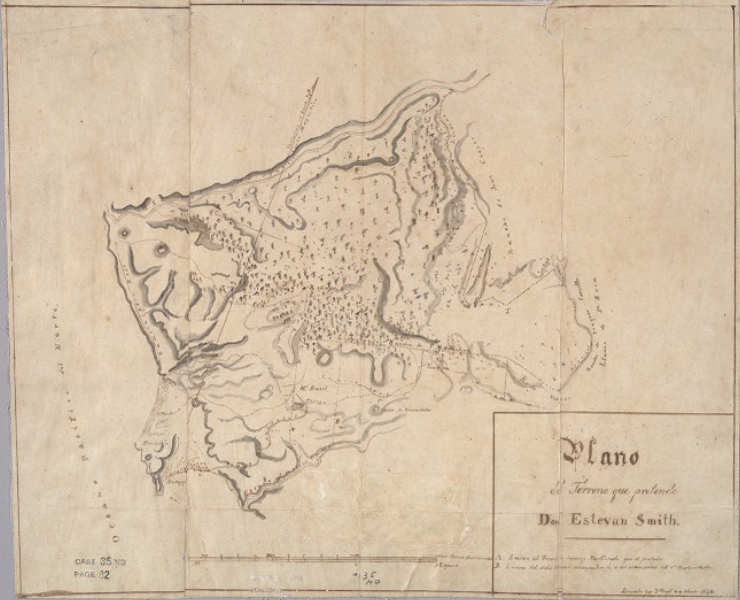
A map of Rancho Bodega by Jean Jacques Vioget, 1843

Rancho Bodega was a 35,487-acre (143.61 km^{2}) Mexican land grant in present-day Sonoma County, California, given in 1844 by Governor Manuel Micheltorena to Stephen Smith. Bodega takes its name from the Peruvian explorer Juan Francisco de la Bodega y Quadra who discovered Bodega Bay in 1775. The grant extended along the Pacific coast from the Russian River on the north to Estero Americano on the south, and included the present-day town of Bodega Bay. Only a small part of Bodega is within the grant (most of Bodega in on Rancho Estero Americano).

== History ==
The Mexican government, which had been concerned about the Russian presence at Fort Ross, was happy to see them leave in 1841, but less pleased when the Russian-American Company sold it to John Sutter. The position of the Mexican government had been that neither land nor improvements had ever belonged to the Russians and hence they could not legally be transferred to anyone else. Within two years after the purchase of Fort Ross, everything Sutter considered salvageable had been removed to his Rancho New Helvetia. In 1844 Sutter leased the land to William (Wilhelm) Benitz, from Baden, Germany, manager of Sutter's Fort Ross holdings and a partner, Ernest Rufus, from Württemberg. That transaction again brought into question the validity of Sutter's title to the property, and Governor Manuel Micheltorena granted Rancho Bodega in part of the southern half of the former Russian claim to Captain Stephen Smith in 1844. Governor Pío Pico granted Rancho Muniz in the northern half of the former Russian claim to Manuel Torres in 1845.

Captain Stephen Smith (1782–1855), a sea captain from Massachusetts, sailed along the Pacific Coast, north of San Francisco in 1841. Local settlers had been shipping their lumber for houses from Hawaii, and Smith saw the timber growing along the shoreline as a business opportunity – particularly with the Russians leaving Fort Ross. Captain Smith returned to California in 1843, with sawmill machinery from Baltimore and built the first steam-powered saw mill in California in the redwoods north of the town of Bodega, on Salmon Creek. On the voyage to California in 1843, Smith married Manuela Torres (1828–1871), a Peruvian. It was her brother Manuel Torres, who joined them, who was granted Rancho Muniz, directly north of Rancho Bodega in 1845. Bodega Bay was Smith's shipping port, and he helped develop the area into a commercial port. Captain Smith owned a small vessel called the Fayaway, which he sailed between the Port of Bodega and San Francisco. In 1844 Smith successfully petitioned the Mexican Governor of California, Manuel Micheltorena, to grant him 8 square leagues. Smith purchased the buildings on the land from John Sutter, who had claimed them under his purchase of Fort Ross from the Russians. Stephen Smith bought Rancho Blucher directly to the south from Jean Jacques Vioget in 1847.

With the cession of California to the United States following the Mexican-American War, the 1848 Treaty of Guadalupe Hidalgo provided that the land grants would be honored. As required by the Land Act of 1851, a claim for Rancho Bodega was filed with the Public Land Commission in 1853 by Victor Prudon (died 1868), who claimed that he was granted the property by Mariano Guadalupe Vallejo in 1841. Lieutenant Colonel Victor Prudon, a Frenchman, was secretary to General Vallejo. The claim was rejected by the Land Commission in 1854.

When Captain Smith died in San Francisco in 1855, he owned the 8-square-league Rancho Bodega with his wife, Manuela Torres and the 6-league Rancho Blucher. Smith left a life interest in one third of Rancho Bodega to his wife and two thirds to his three children – Stephen Manuel Smith (1843–1924), Manuelita Garcia Smith (1846–1942) and James B. Smith (1852 – ?) by Manuela Torres. Smith's widow, Manuela Torres, married Tyler Curtis on December 18, 1856, at Old Saint Mary's Cathedral in San Francisco. A claim was filed with the Public Land Commission in 1852, and the grant was patented to Manuela Torres Curtis in 1859.

When Tyler Curtis received the patent for Rancho Bodega in 1859, he tried to oust settlers who were farming parcels of the rancho. Many of these settlers had rented their land from Captain Smith, and had continued to pay rent. Others were squatters who were holding on to their claims until the property would be put upon the market. Failing to get the settlers to leave by peaceful means, Curtis went to San Francisco and hired militia of about forty men. However, in an event known as the "Bodega War" or the "Tyler Curtis War", two hundred settlers with farm tools and shotguns, confronted Curtis and the hired militia, and he was defeated in his effort to evict them.

Tyler Curtis succeeded in getting the California State Legislature to passed an act in 1861, giving him the right as guardian to sell the three children's interest in the rancho. Curtis sold the grant in parcels of mostly 150 to 500 acres (2.0 km^{2}) each on through the early 1860s. Curtis did not manage to keep his fortune and the rancho passed into other hands. In 1877 James B. Smith, the youngest son, sued to recover the rancho, but the California Supreme Court ruled the sales by Curtis to be legal.
