= Jean Jacques Vioget =

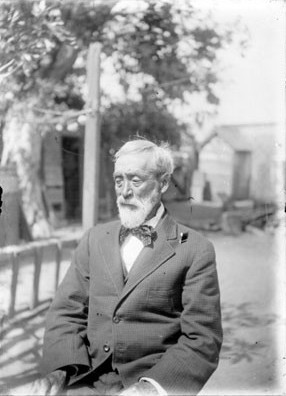
Image of Jean Jacques Vioget

Jean Jacques Vioget (1794–1855), known in Spanish as Don Juan Vioget, originally from Switzerland, was a surveyor and sea captain, who came to California in 1837. He made the first survey and map of Yerba Buena (which later was re-named San Francisco) in 1839. He worked for John Sutter and later moved to San Jose. He was also an artist, violinist, and spoke multiple languages.

== Life ==
Born in Combremont-le-Petit, Switzerland on April 22, 1794, the son of Jean Pierre Vioget and Jeanne Suzanne Meister (or Meystre). He was baptized on 4 May 1794 in the church of Combremont-le -Petit. His baptism record reveals the name of "Jean Jacob Vioget". He joined Napoleon's army in the fourth Swiss Regiment at the age of 19 in November 1813. He enlisted in the "Battalion of Stoffel" in April 1815, and was wounded at the Battle of Wavre. He was later apprenticed to a French naval engineer. In the 1820s he served in the Brazilian navy, rising to the rank of captain, and engaging in the maritime trade in South America. During the early 1830s he was captain of a bark, Delmire, trading along the coast of Peru and Ecuador.

Vioget first arrived in San Francisco, then known as Yerba Buena, in 1837, when only two homes stood in the village - those of Jacob P. Leese and William A. Richardson. It was at this time that Vioget made a watercolor of the San Francisco Bay, which hung in the cabin of his ship for the next two years. He returned to Yerba Buena in 1839.

In 1839 Governor Juan B. Alvarado ordered a survey of Yerba Buena, and the alcalde, Francisco de Haro, employed Vioget to do the work. Vioget's survey covered the area that is now San Francisco's Financial District and featured a grid made of trapezoidal blocks. In 1840, on a third of a block on Clay Street that Vioget received as payment for his work, he built Vioget House, which also had a saloon and billiard parlor. After the Mexican–American War, the house was renamed Portsmouth House in honor of the USS Portsmouth. Vioget became a leading saloon-keeper and merchant in the city, and also continued to offer his services as a surveyor.

Vioget first went to work for fellow countryman John Sutter, surveying Sutter's Sacramento-area land grants in 1841 and 1843. Vioget also served as a witness to Sutter's purchase of Fort Ross from the Russians in December 1841. Vioget was also Sutter's agent in San Francisco.

In 1844, Governor Manuel Micheltorena granted Vioget Rancho Blucher. After his marriage to Maria Montero Benarides de Vasques in 1847, Vioget sold Rancho Blucher to Captain Stephen Smith, grantee of Rancho Bodega directly to the north. Vioget spent his last years in San Jose, where he died in 1855 and is buried.
