= Rancho Laguna de Tache =

Rancho Laguna de Tache may refer to these Mexican land grants in California:

- Rancho Laguna de Tache (Castro), 1846, in Fresno and Kings County
- Rancho Laguna de Tache (Limantour), 1843, in Tulare, Fresno, and Kings County
