= José Abrego =

Californian merchant (1813–1878)

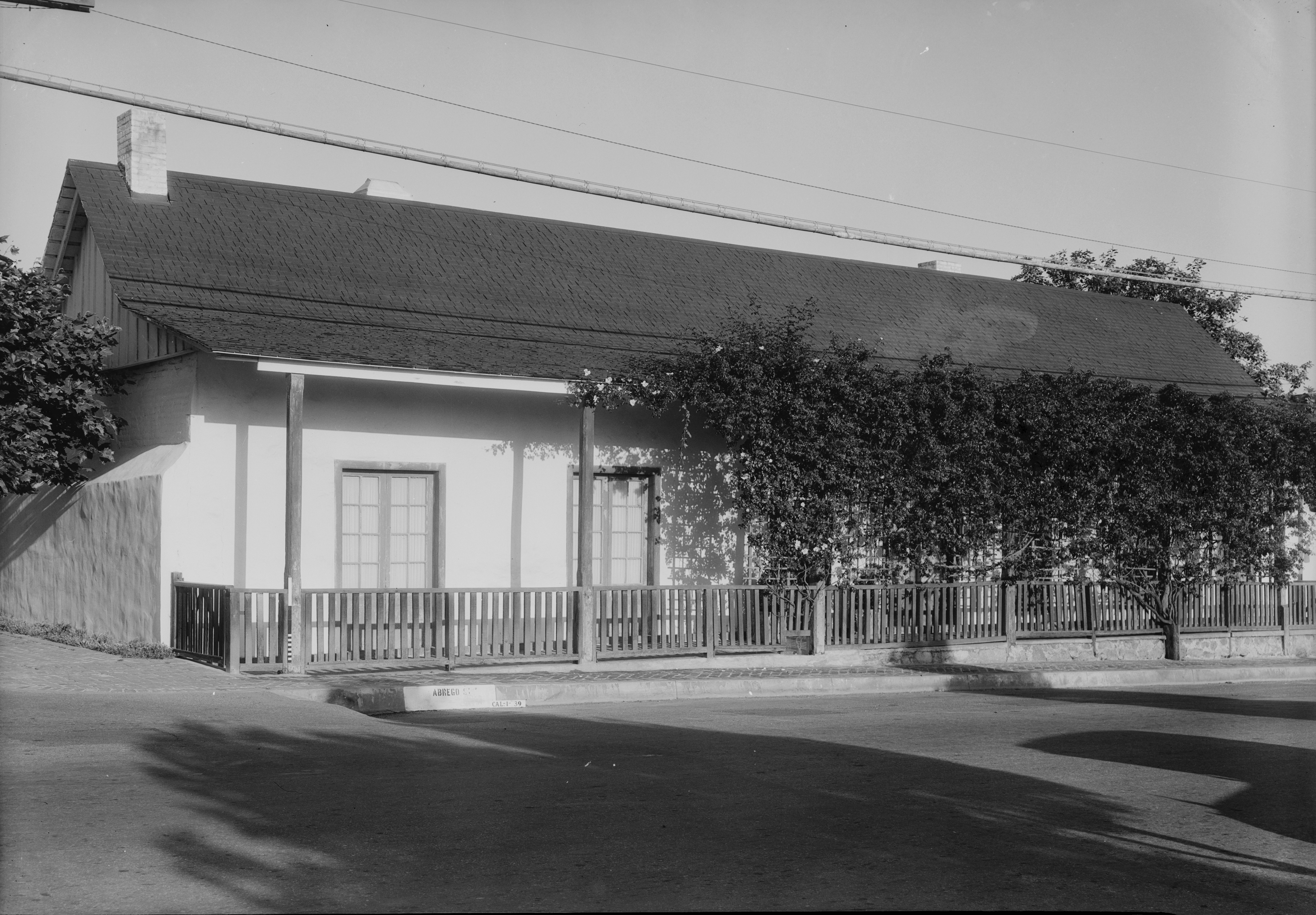
- Home of José Abrego in 1933
- Born: March 3, 1813; Mexico City, viceroyalty of New Spain
- Died: April 3, 1878 (aged 65); Monterey, California, US
- Occupations: Hatter; Trader; Treasurer; Customs Officer; Land owner; Deputy Superintendent of Police; Assembly Member
- Years active: 1934–1878
- Spouse: Maria Josefa Casilda Aniceta Estrada (m. 1836–1878)

José Abrego (3 Mar 1813 – 3 April 1878) was a 19th-century Californian merchant. He arrived in Alta California in 1834 as a member of Compania Cosmopolitan A, part of the Hijar-Padrés colony. It was led by José Maria Hijar and Don José Maria Padrés. Abrego became a merchant in Monterey, California, and held a variety of political offices. He served as treasurer of the territory from 1839 to 1846. After the Mexican–American War, he continued to operate as a merchant. He became very wealthy and built a home that is still preserved in Monterey.

Abrego was born in Mexico City, Mexico. He married Maria Josefa Casilda Aniceta Estrada, a native Californio born in Monterey, in about 1836. She was half-sister of California Governor Juan Bautista Alvarado. He died in 1878. One of his sons, Abimael, married Adelaida Leese, daughter of Rosalia Vallejo.

== Arrival in Alta California ==
On August 17, 1833, and on April 16, 1834, the Diputación de Alta California (legislature) passed legislation to secularize the California missions. In Mexico, acting Mexican president Valentín Gómez Farías, a liberal reformer, appointed José María de Híjar and D. José María Padrés to lead a group of 239 colonists to establish secular control of Alta California. Híjar, a wealthy landowner, was appointed governor to replace Figueroa, and Padrés, an army officer, was appointed military commander. The colonists were farmers and artisans, and were volunteers carefully selected by Farías. His objective was to modernize and strengthen Mexican rule over California, as a bulwark against the growing influence of Russia and the United States.

José Figueroa, governor of Alta California, was charged with secularizing the Francisco mission lands. He was determined that one-half of the mission lands should be held in trust for the indigenous people. Rumors circulated from Mexico that the Hijar was intent on taking the mission estates, and that Padrés had selected administrators from among his companions to oversee the remaining mission lands. They believed the arriving settlers were planning to take possession of the mission lands. Figueroa decided not to wait, and on August 9, 1834, approved a secularization program written by José Antonio Carrillo.

The Morelos arrived in San Diego on September 1, 1833, and La Natalie in Monterey on September 25. Híjar, who was in Los Angeles, believed he was to be the military governor. Padrés thought he would become the civilian governor. A horseback courier from Mexico arrived in Monterey before the colonists. All soon learned from the courier that Antonio López de Santa Anna had become President of Mexico and that José Figueroa was still governor of Alta California. Some members of the Híjar-Padrés colony launched a brief rebellion against Figueroa in Los Angeles, which failed. Figueroa had Híjar and Padrés arrested, and Híjar and his most loyal associates were sent back to Mexico. Abrego, Ignacio Coronel, José Noé, and Agustín Olvera, among others, stayed and contributed to California's success and growth.

== Life in Monterey ==
Abrego had been a hatter in Mexico, and continued that trade in Monterey. He built a one-story Monterey-style adobe home in 1834 that is still in use today. In December 1834, Abrego opened a shop in what is now called the Pacheco House, across the street from his home. He married Maria Josefa Casilda Aniceta Estrada, a native Californio born in Monterey, in about 1836. She was half-sister of California Governor Juan Bautista Alvarado. They moved into a portion of the house that was completed while additions were completed afterward. Testifying of his wealth, Abrego bought the first full-length mirror in Alta California. His daughter reportedly asked her husband, upon seeing herself for the first time in the mirror, "Who is that very lovely girl?" Poet, author, and historian Bayard Taylor wrote about a party he attended at Abrego's home in 1849 in his book El Dorado.

I attended an evening party at the house of Señor Abrego, which was as lively and agreeable as any occasion of the kind well could be. There was a piano in the parlor on which a lady from Sydney, Australia, played with a god deal of taste. Two American gentlemen gave us a few choice flute duets and the entertainment closed by a Spanish quadrille in which a little son of Senior Abrego figure to the general admiration.

José and Josefa Abrego has 18 children. They lived their entire marriage in the home José had constructed, and all of their children were born in the home. In 1841, Jose purchased the first pianofortes brought to California in 1843 for $600 [about $20,732 today]. José wrote a note that he left inside it, on which he wrote:

In 1841, Captain Stephen Smith [sailing out of Baltimore, Maryland, aboard the brigantine George Henry] arrived with his vessel in Monterey, and I engaged him to bring me a piano on his next trip to this country. In March, 1843, he returned to this city in a brigantine; he had three pianos on board. I bought this one of him for $600. He then sailed to San Francisco, where General Vallejo purchased another of the pianos. The third one was afterward sold by Captain Smith to E. de Celis at Los Angeles.

The piano was a six-octave instrument made by Beitkopt & Harrtel in Leipzig. It was imported by Brauns & Focke of Baltimore, who specialized in importing fine German goods. It was still in the home in 1892. The piano was in 1934 owned by Julia "Dulce" Bolado Davis, a granddaughter of José Abrego, located in her home in Tres Pinos near Hollister. She presented the piano to the California Historical Society where it was kept at their offices on McAllister Street in San Francisco. Abrego eventually owned nine lots on Abrego Street. He was among other comfortable, middle-class families whose assessed property was valued between $20,000 and $30,000 (about $895,833 today).

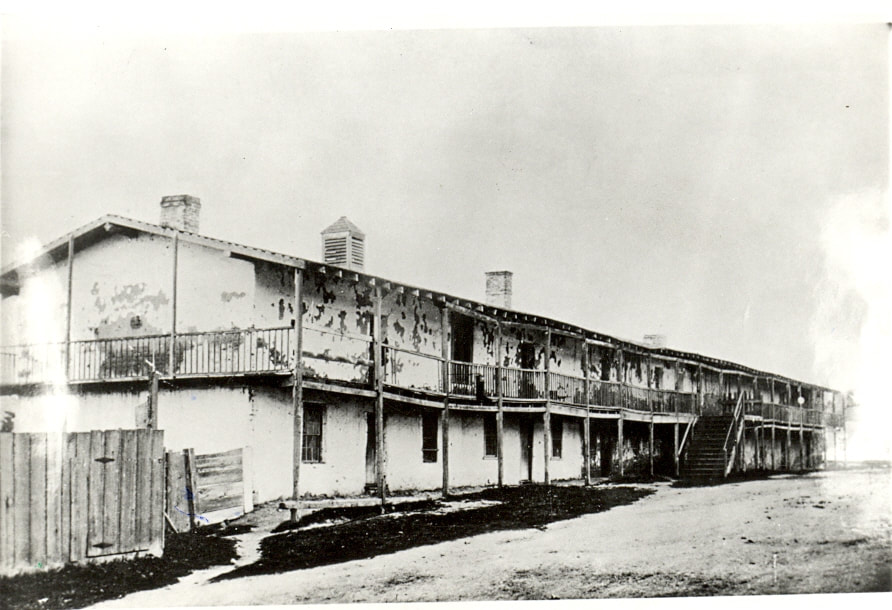
El Cuartel in Monterey, California circa 1860

Abrego built El Cuartel on California Street (now Munras Avenue) in Monterey in the early 1840s. It was an elongated two‐story adobe used by the Mexican government as soldiers' barracks. After the United States claimed California in 1946, they used it as their headquarters. The first issues of the first newspaper in California were printed here. The building was demolished in 1910 and its adobe bricks were used to fill in portions of Hartnell Gulch in the late 1880s.

Abrego was named administrator of Mission San Antonio in 1833 and 1834. He served as treasurer of the territory from 1839 to 1846. As the officer in charge of territorial finances, he was noted for his integrity and ability. He was later the customs officer and was elected to the assembly on October 6, 1845.

When California became a state, he relinquished his title and resumed his business as a merchant. He began making and selling soap which he continued until the California Gold Rush brought regular visits from merchant ships to the coast.

== Land grants ==
=== Rancho San Jose y Sur Chiquito ===
Governor Juan Alvarado granted two square leagues of land in 1839 to Marcelino Escobar, Alcalde of Monterey. Rancho San Jose y Sur Chiquito was named for two bodies of water: San José Creek near Point Lobos and El Río Chiquito del Sur. Two of Escobar's sons, Juan and Agustin, obtained possession of the rancho shortly afterward, and sold it on August 26, 1841, to Doňa Maria Josefa de Abrego for about three cents an acre. She held power of attorney for her husband to buy and sell land. She paid $250, one-half in silver, and one-half in gold.

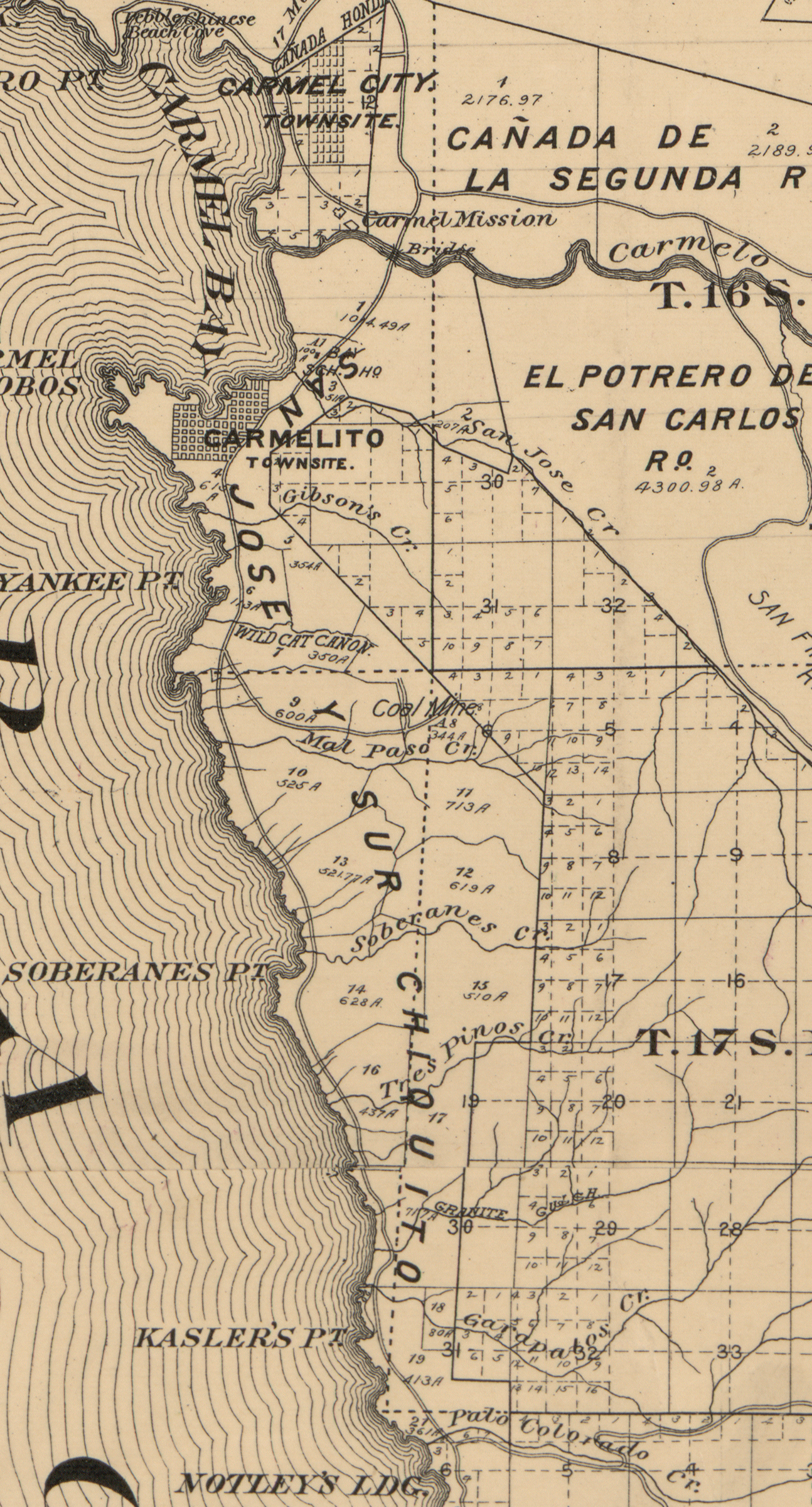
1898 map showing legal boundaries of Rancho San Jose Sur Chiquito following court approval of Castro's claim.

Later on, ownership was complicated by the fact that when Juan and Augustin Escobar sold the rancho to Josefa de Abrego in 1841, they didn't obtain permission from their other brothers and sisters. Under somewhat mysterious circumstances, on January 16, 1843, Maria Abrego deeded the land to a group of about 10 soldiers from the Monterey Presidio. It appears that the soldiers paid nothing, and a legend attached to the transfer says a gambler lost a rancho in a card game. On June 7, 1844, the soldiers turned the Rancho over to their superior officer, Colonel José Castro, former Governor Alvarado's brother-in-law.

When Mexico ceded California to the United States following the Mexican-American War, the 1848 Treaty of Guadalupe Hidalgo provided that the land grants would be honored. But the Land Act of 1851 required owners to prove their ownership, and Castro filed a claim for Rancho San Jose y Sur Chiquito with the Public Land Commission in on February 2, 1853. While waiting for his case to be decided, Castro sold his 8,876 acres of land in 1854 to Joseph S. Emery and Abner Bassett for $700, leaving to them the legal fight for ownership. The commission denied Castro's claim on August 28, 1855, apparently invalidating Escobar's grant in 1839 and all transactions since then. Castro died in 1860. Emery and Bassett appealed Castro's claim to the United States District Court. Bassett died in 1874, leaving his undivided one-half interest to his wife and eight children. Their half of the rancho was appraised at $15,000.

The remaining Escobar siblings contested the sale, and to finance the legal battle, they agreed on March 25, 1859, to give their attorney Delos R. Ashley one-half of the rancho if he obtained title to it. On March 12, 1859, the Abrego heirs gave a quitclaim deed for land north of San Jose Creek to Mathew G. Ireland, who bought 1,000 acres (400 ha) from them in 1860 and 1861. Joseph W. Gregg later bought Ireland's claim. On December 1, 1877, they sold one-ninth of the rancho to Adam Joseph Kopsch. Further complicating ownership, a Sidney S. Johnson said the Emery and Bassett had given him one-third of the rancho.

In 1880, a lawsuit was filed in United States District Court to resolve all of the conflicting claims. Subject to the confirmation of the original claim by Castro, they awarded the Ashley heirs one-ninth; W. T. Baggett, who had bought one-half of the Ashley interest, one-ninth; J. S. Emery, two-ninths; Bassett estate, two-ninths; Sidney S. Johnson, two-ninths; and W. Van Dyke, successor to Kopsch, one-ninth. Joseph W. Gregg's claim to the 1,000 acres (400 ha) north of San Jose Creek was also later validated, as were 27 other minor claims, mostly from squatters. The decision divided Escobar's land grant into 34 parcels.

After long, complex litigation, on June 5, 1882, the court validated Castro's original claim, resolving the conflicting ownership claims. The title was confirmed on December 24, 1885, and President Grover Cleveland signed the land patent on May 4, 1888, 35 years after Castro's initial filing. All of the 32 claims from the 1880 lawsuit were invalidated as a result.

=== Rancho Punta de los Piños ===
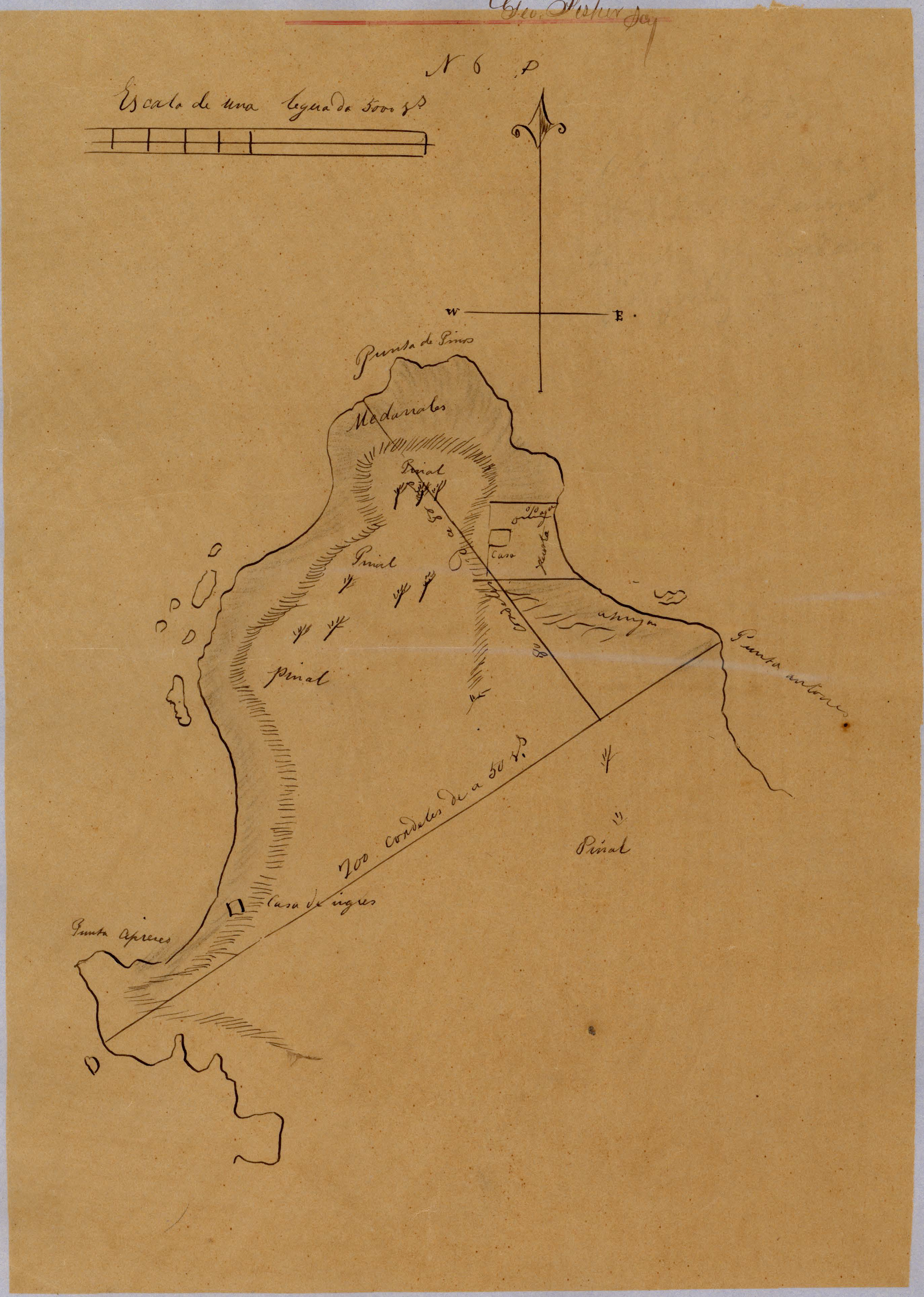
Hand-drawn diseño (map) of Punta de Pinos rancho on December 31, 1852

Rancho Punta de Pinos covered a large portion of the Monterey Peninsula. Its borders extended from Point Cabrillo (the current location of the Hopkins Marine Station), followed the shore of Pacific Ocean west and south to Point Cypress, and then back to Point Cabrillo in a straight line. Governor Figueroa originally granted the rancho to José María Armenta on May 24, 1833. He died in 1838, and his widow sold it six years later on October 4, 1844, to Abrego for $160. Abrego received an affirming grant from Acting governor Manuel Micheltorena on October 4, 1844. By the time Abrego received his patent, county sheriff Henry DeGraw had acquired Leese's share, and Charles Brown had acquired Gleeson's share.

José Abrego sold Rancho Punta de Pinos to Thomas O Larkin and three other associates (Jacob P. Leese, Milton Little, and James H. Gleason) on January 15, 1850, for $30,000. On October 20, 1851, a judge ruled that the original grant was to Armenta and his heirs. Their mother did not have any legal interest in the property. The judge ruled that the eldest son, who was of legal age, had sold his rights to Abrego, but could not sell the rights of his three siblings. Each of the three minor children received a quarter interest in the land, and they in turn gave half to their attorney Pacificus Ord in lieu of fees. On September 2, 1852, Jacob P. Leese, Milton Little, and Santiago Gleeson petitioned the United States land commission for a patent on the land, based on the grant given by Governor Figueroa to Armenta. When the Armenta heirs filed their claim, Little and Gleeson sued Abrego in turn, which was settled out of court. The rancho was divided between the three Armenta heirs and the other claimants. Larkin sold his rights to Leese in 1852. Andrew Randall afterward bought Leese and Abrego's interest, but defaulted, and both successfully sued to recover their ownership. Abrego sold his interest in 1857 to Durrell S. Gregory. David Jacks later acquired the entire rancho.

=== Rancho San Francisquito ===
José Abrego bought Rancho San Francisquito at the probate sale of the estate of William Robert Garner on November 9, 1853. With the cession of California to the United States following the Mexican-American War, the 1848 Treaty of Guadalupe Hidalgo provided that the land grants would be honored. As required by the Land Act of 1851, Abrego filed a claim for Rancho San Francisquito was filed with the Public Land Commission in 1853, and the grant was patented to José Abrego on June 8, 1862. On July 18, 1853, Abrego sold the land to Lewis F. Belcher, known as the "Big Eagle of Monterey", an American from New York who has first arrived in Monterey in 1842.

== Limantour land claims ==
In 1853, Joseph Yves Limantour filed claims with the United States Public Land Commission, claiming that acting Mexican governor Manuel Micheltorena had granted him 47 square leagues (200,000 acres) of Mexican land grants. A week later he added claims to additional lands in Northern and Southern California totaling 924.34 square miles, or 594,783 acres (240,700 ha). The claims included eighty square leagues of Cape Mendocino; Tiburon peninsula, the Farallones, Alcatraz; four square leagues of San Francisco (all the land south of California Street); Rancho Ojo de Agua; the eleven square league Rancho Laguna de Tache; the eleven square league Rancho Cienega del Gabilan; the eleven square league Rancho Lupyomi; and the six square leagues Rancho Cahuenga.

Limantour was a ship captain and trader who had supplied the government of Manuel Micheltorena with goods and loans, Limantour said often in exchange for land grants. Mexican government records were often incomplete and not well documented. Limantour offered as proof a grant signed by Micheltorena in Los Angeles on February 27, 1843. A clerk named Vicente P. Gomez said he went to the Recorder's office in the former state capital of Monterey at the request of José Castro to find papers relevant to a property owned by Castro. There he accidentally found the original Mexican expediente, or packet of documents with official seals and signatures, in the Recorder of Monterey's office in 1853. He said Abrego advised him to take a copy, which he did. Vicente Gomez had previously claimed during 1953 four leagues of land in his name through his attorney, Pacificus Ord. When the board of land commissioners denied his claim, he appealed to the United States District Court in San Francisco. The US District Attorney, who happened to be Pacificus Ord, represented to the Appeals Court that Gomez claim was valid, and they sustained his appeal. The case made its way to the US Supreme Court in 1859, where evidence was introduced that Gomez had conveyed half of the land to Ord. The Supreme Court voided the claim.

=== Abrego's testimony ===
Abrego, the former treasurer of Alta California, was among the witnesses who verified the truth of Limantour's claims. He testified to the land commission that all accounts between Limantour and Micheltorena passed through his hands as the Commissary of the department. He said he knew in 1843 of the financial transactions between Limantour and the Governor and was aware of the land grant. He told the court that he recalled that General Micheltorena was loaned $80,000 by Limantour. The Mexican government paid "some sixty or sixty-six thousands dollars" of that amount, and Micheltorena granted Limantour "certain lands"in lieu of the remaining debt. He recalled charges in the books against Micheltorena in the amount of $70,000 to $80,000. Abrego described the records kept as one column in which was entered all the money received by Micheltorena to be used as public funds, and in the opposite column all disbursements made by him. He told the court he had signed the certificate by the governor's order, and had given it to Limantour the year before Micheltorena returned to Mexico. In January, 1856, the three members of the United States Land Commission agreed with Limantour's claims to about three-quarters of San Francisco, and the next week, granted him the claims north of San Francisco and the islands in the bay. Unsurprisingly, everyone who believed they owned land on which he now held legal title to were extremely upset.

Suspicions were soon aroused about the truthfulness of the claims. Two studies completed soon after California became a state, the first by Captain Henry W. Hallecka, and the second by William Carey Jones, a lawyer and linguist, had not found Limantour's grants. Limantour had never occupied the land, and never before presented a claim. A former business associate of Limantour's named Auguste Jouan publicly claimed Limantour was a fraud. Jouan wrote that François Jacomet told him Emile Letanneur had forged the papers. Jacomet corroborated the falsehood at first, but was later found to have gone into a court in Mexico where he swore he knew nothing about any fraud. Letanneur was summoned to appear, and initially confirmed the story of fraud, but then he too recanted. A grand jury indicted Limantour for criminal fraud and perjury. The U.S. government secured $70,000 (about $2,604,808 today) in funding to secure Letanneur's conviction. Edwin M. Stanton was hired as special counsel for a $25,000 fee. The Recorder and Deputy Clerk in the Recorders Office in Monterey during the period Gomez said he found the espediente testified he had never seen any such document. He said that Gomez was the first person to tell him of Limantour's claims, and that Gomez told him Abrego was involved, but that Gomez thought the claim was fraudulent. A box of Mexican financial records were coincidentally located at the United States Armory in Benicia, California. Among the papers were Treasurer José Abrego's account books.

=== Abrego contradicted ===
Archivist R. C. Hopkins testified that all of the items and entries by Abrego in the records were witnessed with his signature, and sometimes the signature of the recipient. Monthly and yearly balance sheets were examined and audited by the Governor or another officer. He testified that all of the disbursements were numbered as were the accompanying receipts. There were no entries of credits and charges in opposite columns as Abrego had testified, no charge in the books against Micheltorena in the amount of $70,000 or $80,000, or of any other amount. Hopkins told the court that there was no charge to Limantour and credit to Micheltorena for a certificate for lands in Upper and Lower California for more than $6,000 nor any reference to any such item. He told the court that he found no transactions between Limantour and Micheltorena.

United States Attorney Delia Torre presented additional evidence that the Limantour documents were fraudulent. He introduced a series of photographic enlargements that compared the Limantour documents side by side with land-grant documents of known authenticity. It was obvious that the lettering and the official seals on the Limantour papers were significantly different from the others. On November 19, 1858, Limantour's claims were judged fraudulent in Federal court. Abrego's testimony along with that of other witnesses was described in court as perjury.

== José Abrego adobe ==
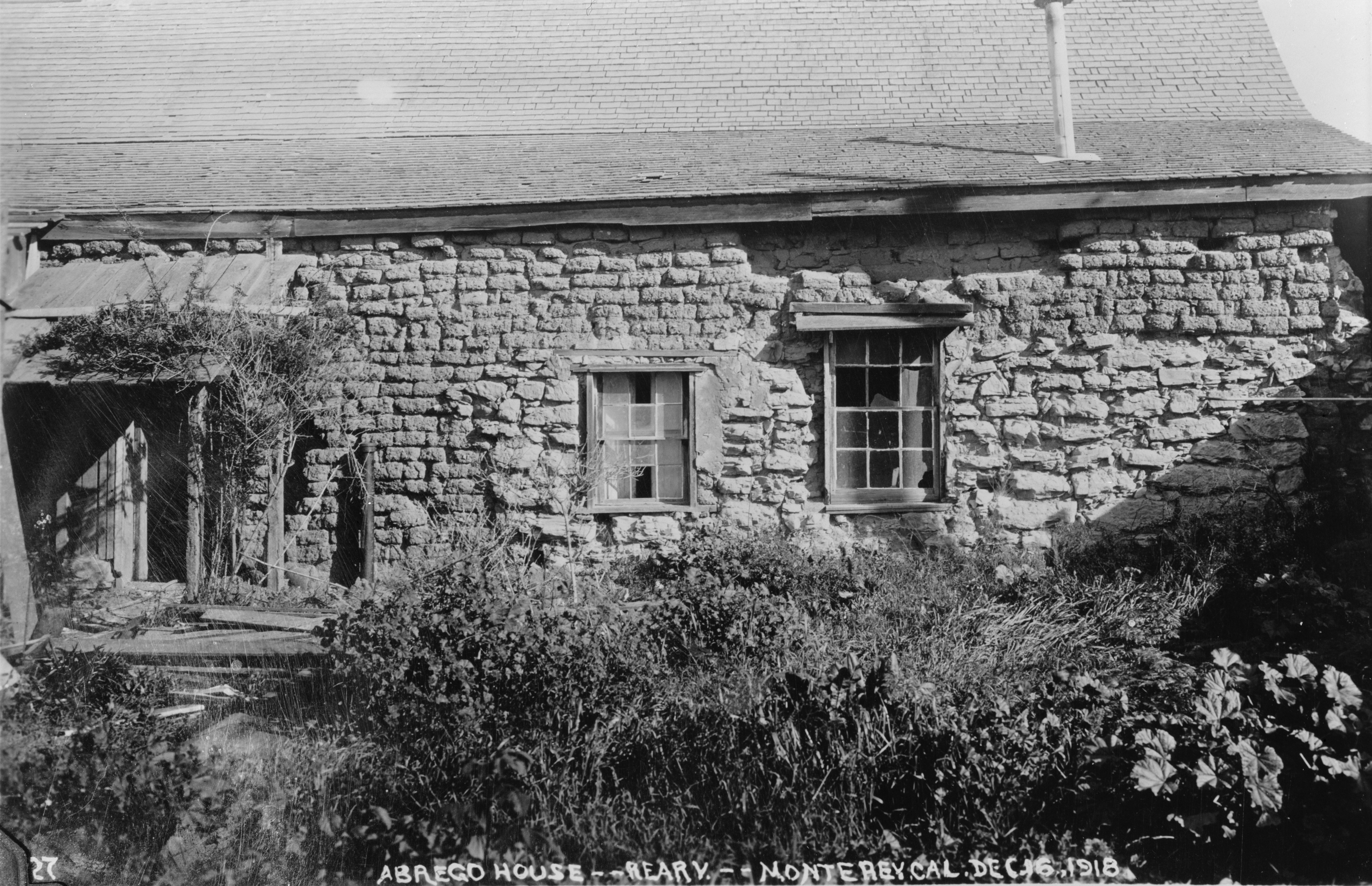
Historic Abrego adobe before restoration

The Abrego home built in 1834 is privately owned today. It was designed by Don Estevan de la Torre, brother of Joaquin de la Torre, formerly alcalde of Monterey and secretary to Governor Pablo Vicente de Solá. Native Americans were hired to build the adobe. It is a single-story adobe and wood structure. The upper gables are wood. It has French doors, six-over-six windows, and a full-length, narrow porch with a balustrade on the front of the building. Portions of the home were used as a store during its early years. It was assessed in 1851 for a value of $200, and in 1855 for $400.

Some of the timbers used to construct the building were salvaged from the Natalia, the vessel on which Abrego arrived in Monterey. Earlier in its existence, the same vessel under the name Inconstant was reportedly used by Napoleon Bonaparte to leave his exile on Elba. Bought by smugglers, the anchor chain parted during a gale and the ship wrecked on the shore. The interior ceilings are 12 feet (3.7 m) high. The three interior French doors are made of teak salvaged from the deck of the wrecked Natalia.

The home was originally part of a complex of buildings owned by Abrego on the site, and he owned other buildings in Monterey, including a building across the street from the building now known as Casa de Oro, a general merchandise store operated by Joseph Boston & Co. In early 1920, Jose's son Abdel sold the home in August 1920 to Esther Stevens Barney, an artist. She added modern plumbing and a new fireplace. She used the building as a studio until she sold it in 1924 to artist Mary Black. Black eventually purchased almost the entire city block on either side of Abrego Street. Landscape architect and movie set designer Florence Yoch designed the Casa Abrego gardens in 1955. It is one of the oldest landmarks in Monterey.

The building was set to be razed in 1955 to make way for a parking lot. Local women including prominent preservationist Mayo Hayes 0'Donnel formed a committee and organized the Casa Abrego Club. The Monterey Foundation bought the building in 1956 to prevent its immediate destruction. The club leased the building and opened the building for luncheons in 1957. The Casa Abrego Club bought the adobe at 592 Abrego Street in 1959 from the Foundation. The Casa Abrego Club is a private ladies social club. The home is one of 55 historic sites along Monterey's 2 miles (3.2 km) Path of History. The club opens the building to the public during Christmas each year.

== Later life ==
Jose Abrego died on April 4, 1878, of complications relating to asthma. At age 78 in 1892, Josefa Abrego had outlived all but five of her children. She continued to live in their home until she died on December 27, 1897. According to her obituary, "Her husband held successively the Office of Commissary of Police, Administrator of San Antonio Mission, Customs Officer, member of the Department Assembly and substitute member of the Superior Tribunal. From 1839 to 1846 be had charge of Territorial finances. In 1844 the deceased and her husband were made grantees of the Point Pinos Rancho, where Monterey. Pacific Grove, and Del Monte now are. He died in 1868 after having been declared by Judge Hoffman a perjurer in the celebrated Limantour land case."
