= Rhoades Ranch =

Historic ranch in California, United States

- U.S. National Register of Historic Places
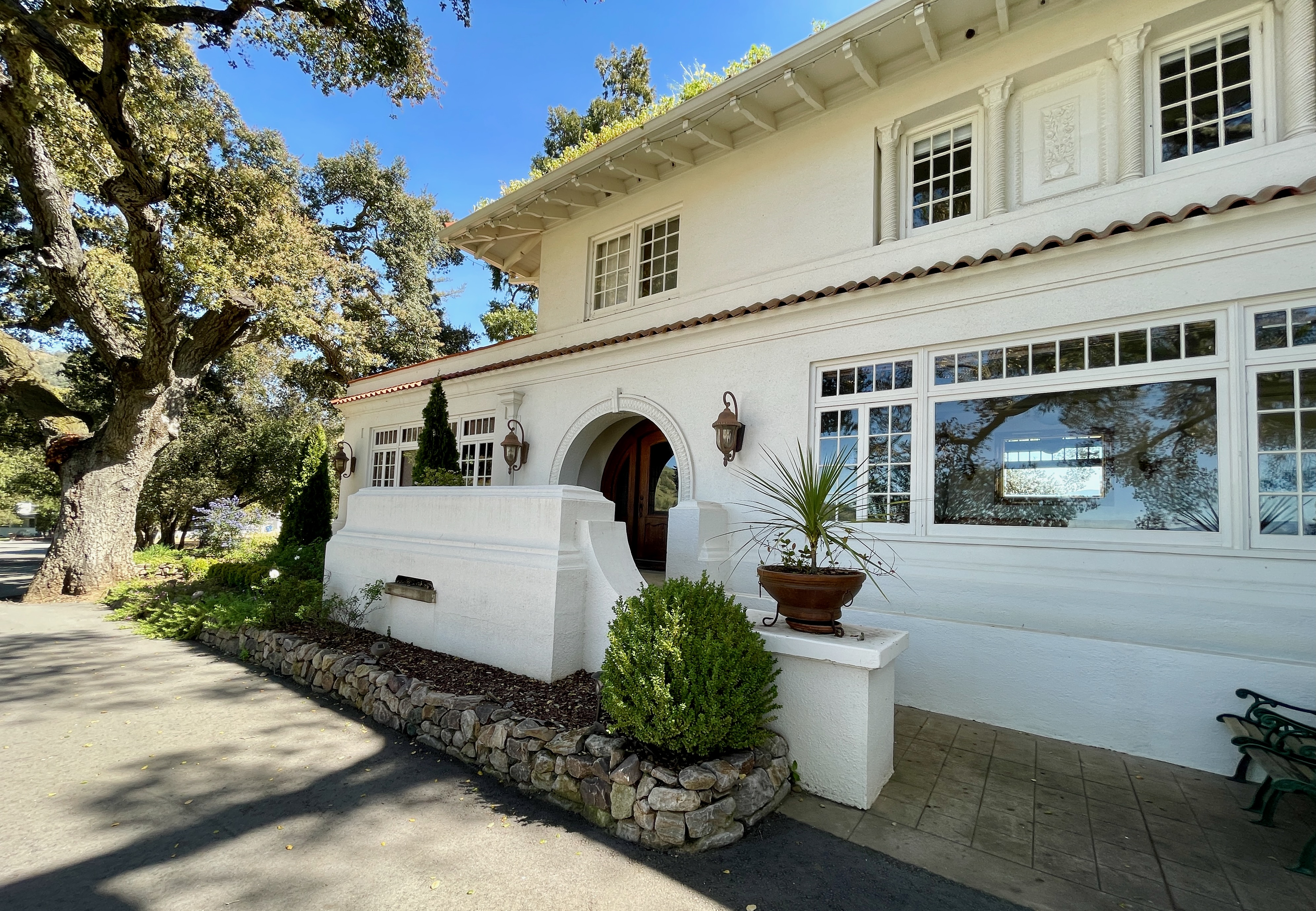
- Rhoades House on the ranch property

- Location within California
- Location: 2290-A Cochrane Road, Morgan Hill, California, US
- Coordinates: 37°09′51″N 121°37′54″W
- Built: 1920; 106 years ago
- Architect: Howard W. Higbie and Andrew P. Hill Jr.
- Architectural style: Spanish Colonial Revival architecture
- NRHP reference No.: 13000158
- Added to NRHP: April 17, 2013

The Rhoades Ranch is a historic ranch, located near Morgan Hill, California. The 12 acres (4.9 ha) ranch is linked to Harold E. Thomas, an important figure in California's strawberry industry, and encompasses the Rhoades House, a Spanish Colonial Revival architecture residence built in 1917-1920, for William G. Rhoades and designed by architects Howard W. Higbie and Andrew P. Hill Jr. The Rhoades Ranch was officially recognized and listed on the National Register of Historic Places on April 17, 2013.

== History ==
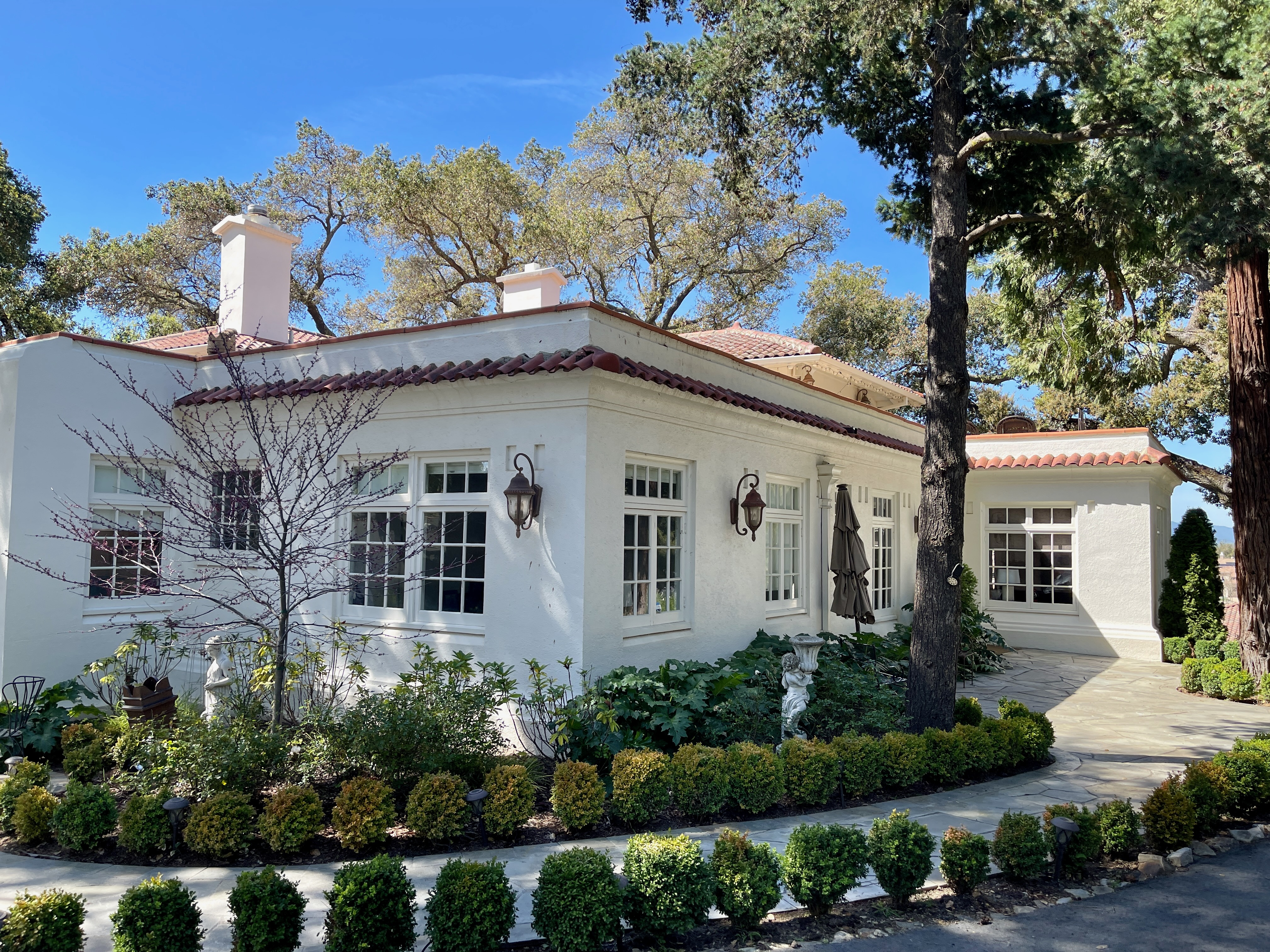
Rhoades House with Spanish roof tiles (1920)

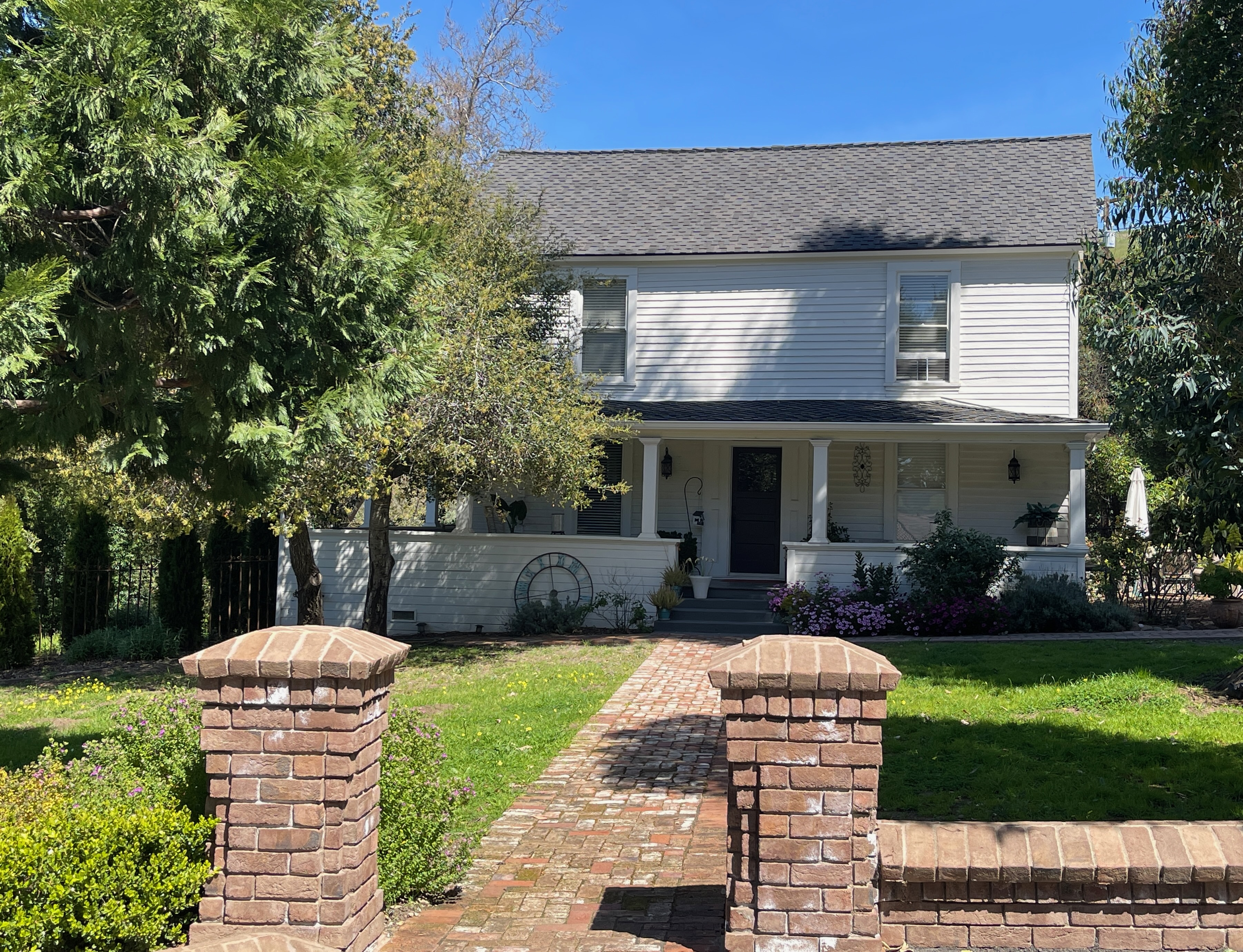
Phegley House (1863)

The Rhoades Ranch is close to the Anderson Reservoir formed by damming of Coyote Creek in southern Santa Clara County, California. The 12 acres (4.9 ha) parcel occupies the northeast corner of what was formerly a 160 acres (65 ha) ranch, established in the 1860s during the subdivision of the Mexican era Rancho Laguna Seca. Today, much of the original ranchland is recognized as Borello Farms, a 123 acres (50 ha) operational ranch located to the south and west. Perched atop a rise adjacent to Coyote Creek, the site has views of the orchards belonging to Borello Farms.

William G. Rhoades purchased the Rhoades Ranch with his father, Ira Rhoades, in 1911, that was part of the old Laguna Seca grant. In 1917, Ira Rhoades started the construction of the residence on a knoll with a view of the orchards. By 1920, Rhoades completed the house and had bought out his father's share in the property. He then implemented a pumping system to draw water from Coyote Creek to supply water for his orchards. Rhoades Married Katherine Garnett and together had two boys, William G. Jr., and David Garnett Rhoades.

In 1924, the Rhoades Ranch had 55 acres (22 ha) of nine and ten-year old prune trees, which produced only 26 tonnes (26,000 kg) of fruit, but the production increased to over 220 tonnes (220,000 kg) after spraying.

In 1945, the widow of Rhoades sold approximately 14.31 acres (5.79 ha) to Dr. Harold E. Thomas of the Strawberry Institute of Santa Clara Valley. The larger 145 acres (59 ha) was sold to Sebastian and Luigia Borello, now recognized as Borello Farms.

The Ranch shares the site with several other structures that include the Phegley House and garage, a horse barn, an agricultural equipment building, office/board-and-batten house and garage, and remnants of a water tank. The Phegley house, a two-story National Folk house, stands as the earliest known structure on the site. Built in the early 1860s during the initial American settlement phase of Santa Clara County, it is a two-story single-wall house. Single-wall houses were among the earliest building types in California during the American era, utilizing large redwood lumber planks for rapid construction. This construction method was prevalent from the mid-1850s to the late 1860s, predating the railroad era in California.

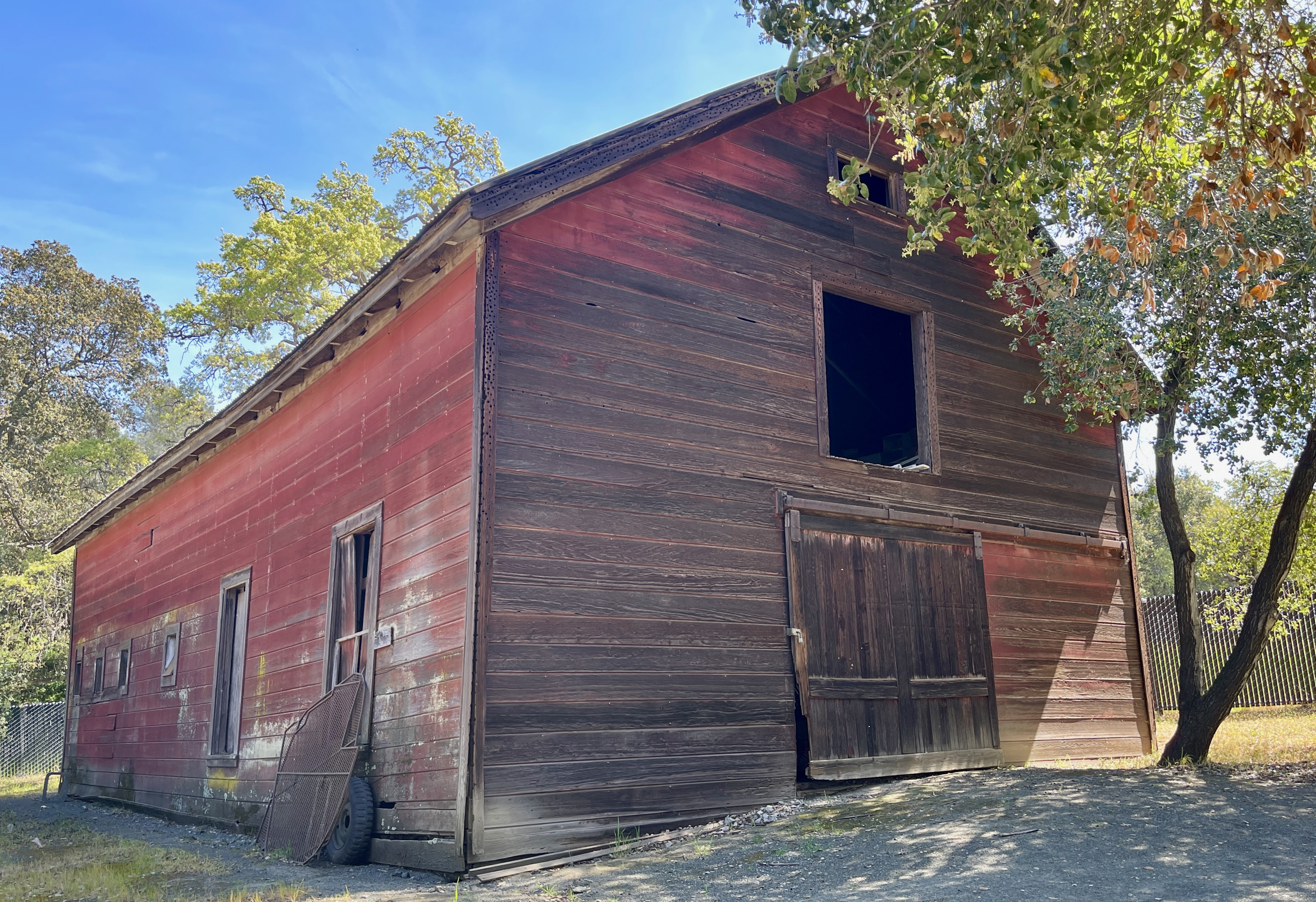
Horse Barn (1860s)

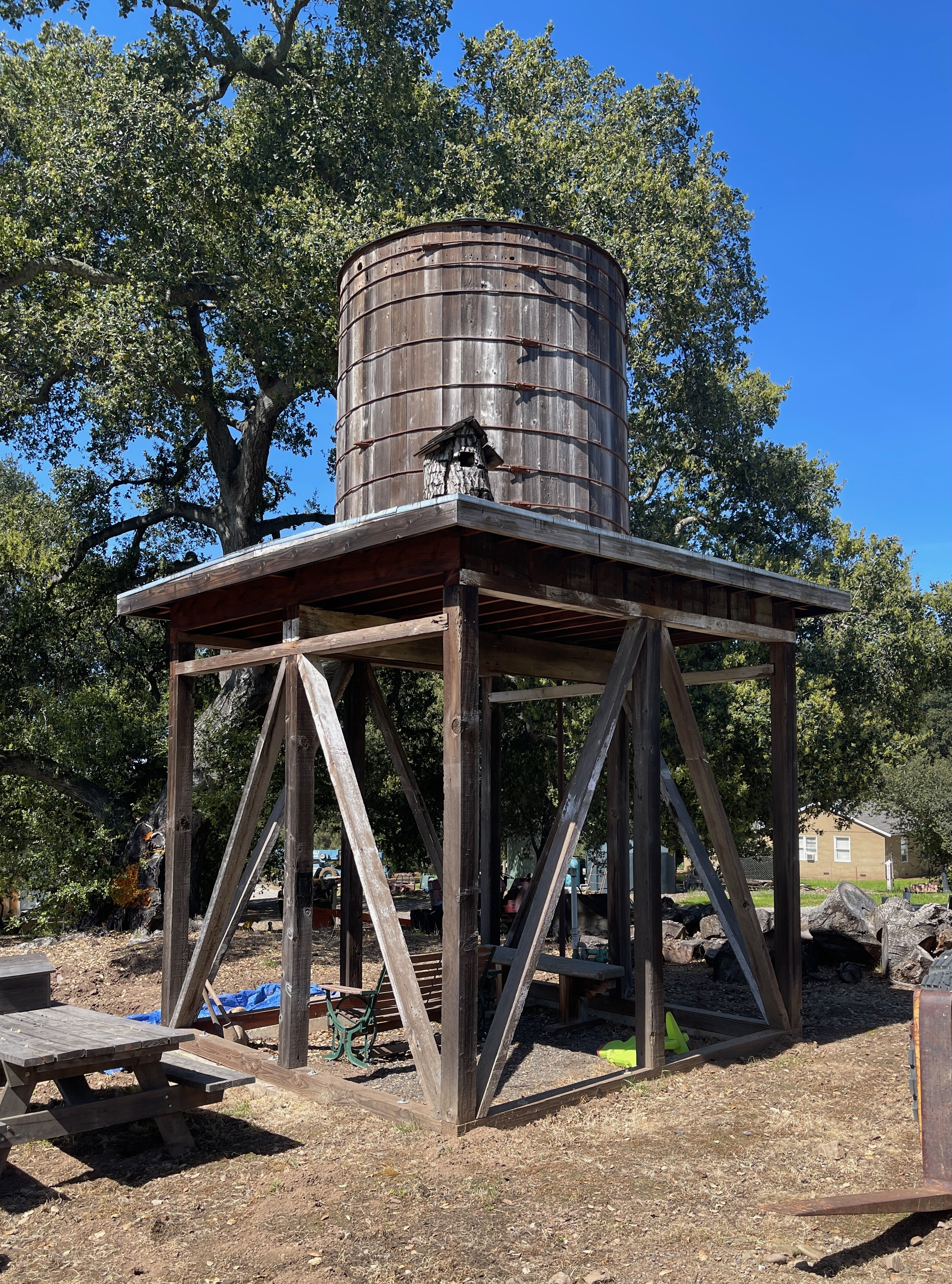
Water tower remnant structure (pre-1920)

This horse barn, situated uphill from the residences near Coyote Road, is of moderate size and likely built during the same decade as the Phegley House. It has a rectangular shape and stands at one-and-one-half stories tall, featuring front and rear gables. The upper level houses a hay storage area accessible from both front and rear hay-doors located above sliding doors at both ends. To the southwest of the barn stands the remnants of a former large water tower. This structure likely took place during the nineteenth century. The original siding and tank have since been removed.

== Design ==
The Rhoades House was designed by architects Howard W. Higbie and Andrew P. Hill Jr. Howard Wetmore Higbie moved from New York to San Jose in 1912. Andrew P. Hill, Jr., was the son of Andrew P. Hill, the photographer and California landscape artist. After World War I, Hill collaborated on several projects with Higbie.

Construction of the Rhoades House started in 1917, and the project reached completion in 1920. The house is an example of Spanish Colonial Revival architecture with a detached garage. The house has a square footprint, with one narrow wing extending northward from the front of the house. While primarily one-story, there's a two-story L-shaped section rising from the southwest corner, extending across the front of the square footprint. The second floor is sheltered beneath a gently sloped roof, with Spanish roof tiles and extending over large, sweeping eaves. The detached garage shares the same architectural style as the house. It features a Spanish tile mansard and includes matching multi-light windows.

== Historical status ==
The Rhoades Ranch was nominated to the National Register of Historic Places on February 8, 2013, and registered on April 17, 2013.

The Rhoades Ranch is historically significant under Criterion A, in the area of agriculture due to its association with Harold E. Thomas and Earl Goldsmith of the Strawberry Institute of Santa Clara Valley. In 1944, Earl Goldsmith and Harold Thomas quit their University of California, Berkeley jobs and went to work for the newly formed Strawberry Institute on the Rhoades property from 1945 to 1966. The company purchased seedlings and germplasm from the university that represented the life work of Goldsmith and Thomas. In 1966, the Strawberry Institute of California would later merge with Driscoll's Strawberry Associates.

Additionally, Rhoades Ranch holds significance under Criterion C, in architecture as an early example of Spanish Colonial Revival architecture for the period, and with the local architects Howard W. Higbie and Andrew P. Hill Jr. The period of significance is from 1863 to 1966.

== See also ==
- National Register of Historic Places listings in Santa Clara County, California
