= Rancho Punta de Pinos =

1833 Mexican land grant in California

Coordinates: 36.610°N 121.940°W

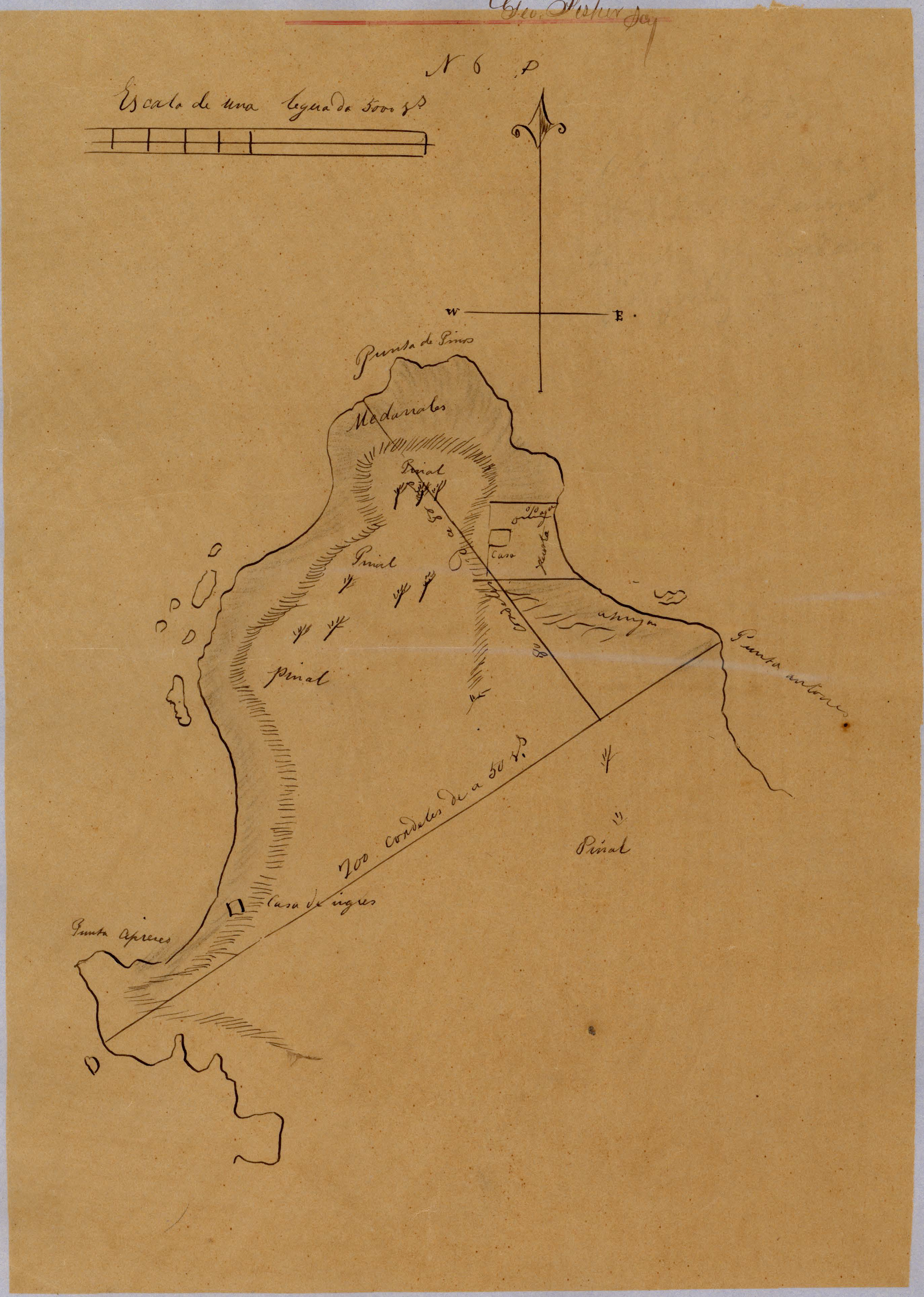
Hand-drawn diseño (map) of Punta de Pinos rancho on December 31, 1852

Rancho Punta de Pinos was a 2,667-acre (10.79 km^{2}) Mexican land grant in present-day Monterey County, California given in 1833 by Governor José Figueroa to José María Armenta, and regranted to José Abrego in 1844 by Governor Manuel Micheltorena. The name means "Point of the Pines". The grant extended along the Pacific coast from Point Pinos near Pacific Grove south to Rancho Pescadero.

== History ==
José María Armenta, was born in Mexico in 1761 and was granted the half square league Rancho Punta de Pinos in 1833. In 1844 the land was regranted to José Abrego by Governor Manuel Micheltorena. José Abrego (1803–1878) came to California in 1834 with the Hijar-Padres Colony. In 1836, Abrego married Maria Josefa Estrada (1814–1897), daughter of José Raimundo Estrada (1784–) and half sister of Juan B. Alvarado. José Abrego was administrator of Mission San Antonio in 1833 and 1834, customs officer, member of the Assembly. In 1841 under somewhat mysterious circumstances his wife Maria Josefa Abrego bought Rancho San Jose y Sur Chiquito. José Abrego bought Rancho San Francisquito in 1853.

José Abrego sold Rancho Punta de Pinos to Thomas O Larkin and three other associates (Jacob P. Leese, Milton Little, and James H. Gleason) in 1850. By the time of the patent, county sheriff Henry DeGraw had acquired the share of Leese; and Charles Brown had acquired the share of Gleason.

With the cession of California to the United States following the Mexican-American War, the 1848 Treaty of Guadalupe Hidalgo provided that the land grants would be honored. As required by the Land Act of 1851, a claim for Rancho Punta de Pinos was filed by Leese, Little, and Gleason with the Public Land Commission in 1852, and the grant was patented to Henry DeGraw and Charles Brown in 1880. A claim filed by L. E. Pogue and Pacificus Ord with the Land Commission in 1853 was rejected.

The rancho was later acquired by David Jacks. He sold part of the rancho to the Pacific Grove Retreat Association in 1878 and later sold it to the Pacific Improvement Company in 1880.

In 1850, the United States Congress appropriated money to build lighthouses on the west coast. One of these was to be constructed at Point Pinos, because of the danger to mariners attempting to enter Monterey Bay from the south. The government bought 25 acres (10 ha) of the Rancho Punta de Pinos. They later purchased another 67 acres (27 ha). Construction began in 1853, but difficulties with the delivery of the Fresnel lens from France delayed the opening of the lighthouse until 1855.

== Historic sites of the Rancho ==
- Point Pinos Light. Point Pinos Light was built in 1855 to guide ships on the Pacific coast.

== See also ==
- Ranchos of California
- List of Ranchos of California
