= Rancho San Francisquito (Munrás) =

Mexican land grant in California

Coordinates: 36.480°N 121.800°W

Rancho San Francisquito was a 8,813-acre (35.66 km^{2}) Mexican land grant in present-day Monterey County, California given in 1835 by Governor José Castro to Catalina Manzanelli de Munrás. The grant was located in the upper Carmel Valley. As of current day, it is part of The Santa Lucia Preserve, a gated community and nature preserve.

== History ==
The two square league grant was made to Catalina Manzanelli de Munrás who was the wife of Esteban Munrás (1798–1850), a Monterey trader, amateur painter, and grantee of Rancho San Vicente. Catalina Manzanelli, the daughter of Maria Casilda Ponce de León and Nicolas Manzanelli, a silk merchant from Genoa, Italy, was also grantee of Rancho Laguna Seca.

William Robert Garner(1803–1849), an English ex-whalerman, arrived in Santa Barbara in 1824, and in Monterey in 1828. In 1831, he married Antonia Francisca Butrón (1814–1883), one of the heirs to Rancho La Natividad. Garner began cutting lumber from the redwoods in the upper Carmel Valley. William Garner bought Rancho San Francisquito. He was killed by Indians in 1849.

José Abrego was the administrator of Mission San Antonio in 1833 and 1834. In 1836, Abrego married Josefa Estrada (1814–), and in 1841 she bought Rancho San Jose y Sur Chiquito. José Abrego was the grantee of Rancho Punta de Pinos in 1844 and in 1853 he bought Rancho San Francisquito at the probate sale of William Robert Garner estate.

With the cession of California to the United States following the Mexican-American War, the 1848 Treaty of Guadalupe Hidalgo provided that the land grants would be honored. As required by the Land Act of 1851, José Abrego filed a claim for Rancho San Francisquito with the Public Land Commission in 1853 and the grant was patented to him in 1862. On July 18, 1853, Abrego sold the land to Lewis F. Belcher, known as the "Big Eagle of Monterey", an American from New York who has first arrived in Monterey in 1842.

In 1858 Bradley Varnum Sargent, who already owned Rancho Potrero de San Carlos bordering Rancho San Francisquito, bought this land as well. Sargent (1828–1893), born in New Hampshire, came to California with his three brothers, Jacob L. Sargent (1818–1890), Roswell C. Sargent (1821–1903), and James P. Sargent (1823-1890) in 1849. In 1856 the Sargent brothers bought Rancho Juristac. Rancho San Francisquito was later combined into Rancho Potrero de San Carlos.

== See also ==
- Ranchos of Monterey County, California
