= Rancho Laguna de Tache (Castro) =

Mexican land grant in California

Coordinates: 36.460°N 119.670°W

Rancho Laguna de Tache was a 48,801-acre (197.49 km^{2}) Mexican land grant in present-day Fresno County and Kings County, California given in 1846 by Governor Pío Pico to Manuel Castro. The grant is named for the lake of the Tachi band of the Yokuts people. The grant extended along the north bank of the Kings River from Kingsburg down river for twenty six miles, and included the present-day Laton, Riverdale and Lanare. This grant is not to be confused with the grant of the same name on the South side of Kings River later claimed by Joseph Yves Limantour.

== History ==
The eleven square league grant was made to Manuel de Jesus Castro (1821-1885) in 1843, although a deed to secure the ownership was not issued until 1846. Castro's father, Simeon Castro, owned Rancho Bolsa Nueva y Moro Cojo. Manuel Castro had been an Army captain under Governor Manuel Micheltorena. Castro had also served as prefect of the Northern District of California. Castro remained in Monterey and sent Ysidor Villa to Rancho Laguna de Tache as foreman.

With the cession of California to the United States following the Mexican-American War, the 1848 Treaty of Guadalupe Hidalgo provided that the land grants would be honored. As required by the Land Act of 1851, a claim was filed with the Public Land Commission in 1853, and the grant was patented to Manuel Castro in 1866. A claim for two square leagues by Jeremiah Clark was rejected by the Public Land Commission. A claim for 11 leagues was filed by Joseph Yves Limantour in 1853, but was rejected by the Commission.

Jeremiah Clark acquired the entire Rancho Laguna de Tache from Manuel Castro in 1866. Clark built "Grant House" about three miles west of Laton in 1879. In 1880 Clark leased Rancho Laguna de Tache to the Polley Heilbron & Company for a term of 10 years, with an option of purchasing this lands. Clarke's wife, Charlotte, had Clark declared mentally incompetent and, after numerous court cases, prevented Polley Heilbron & Company from purchasing the Rancho. Charlotte F. Clark sold the Rancho to Charles A. Laton, a San Francisco capitalist and Llewellyn A. Nares, an Englishman (for whom the towns Laton and Lanare are named) in 1896. In 1892, the Fresno Canal and Irrigation Company secured and gained control of the Rancho's riparian water claims.
