= Esteban Munrás =

Spanish-American painter

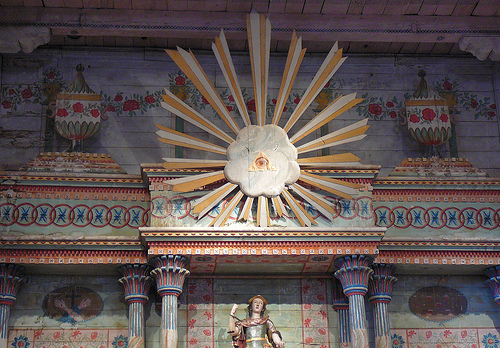
The Ojo de Dios on the altar at Mission San Miguel Arcángel, painted by Munrás in the 1820s

Esteban Carlos Munràs (1798–1850) was a Spanish-born Californio artist, best known for his vibrantly colored frescoes that adorn the church at Mission San Miguel Arcángel in San Miguel, California.

== Early life ==
Esteban Carlos Munràs was born in Barcelona in 1798, to Salvador Munràs and Engràcia Estany. Having studied art in his native Spain, Munràs immigrated to the Alta California as a young man, ultimately making his home in its capital, Monterey.

Munrás was a dealer in cattle hides and tallow, the products of his Rancho San Vicente. He built Casa Munrás, the first home to be constructed outside the walls of the El Presidio Reál de San Carlos de Monterey, where he established a thriving trading house attached to the family home. Munrás imported fine household furnishings and necessities to the earliest settlers in Monterey, California's first capital.

His wife, Catalina Manzanelli de Munrás, was grantee of Rancho Laguna Seca and Rancho San Francisquito.

== Career ==
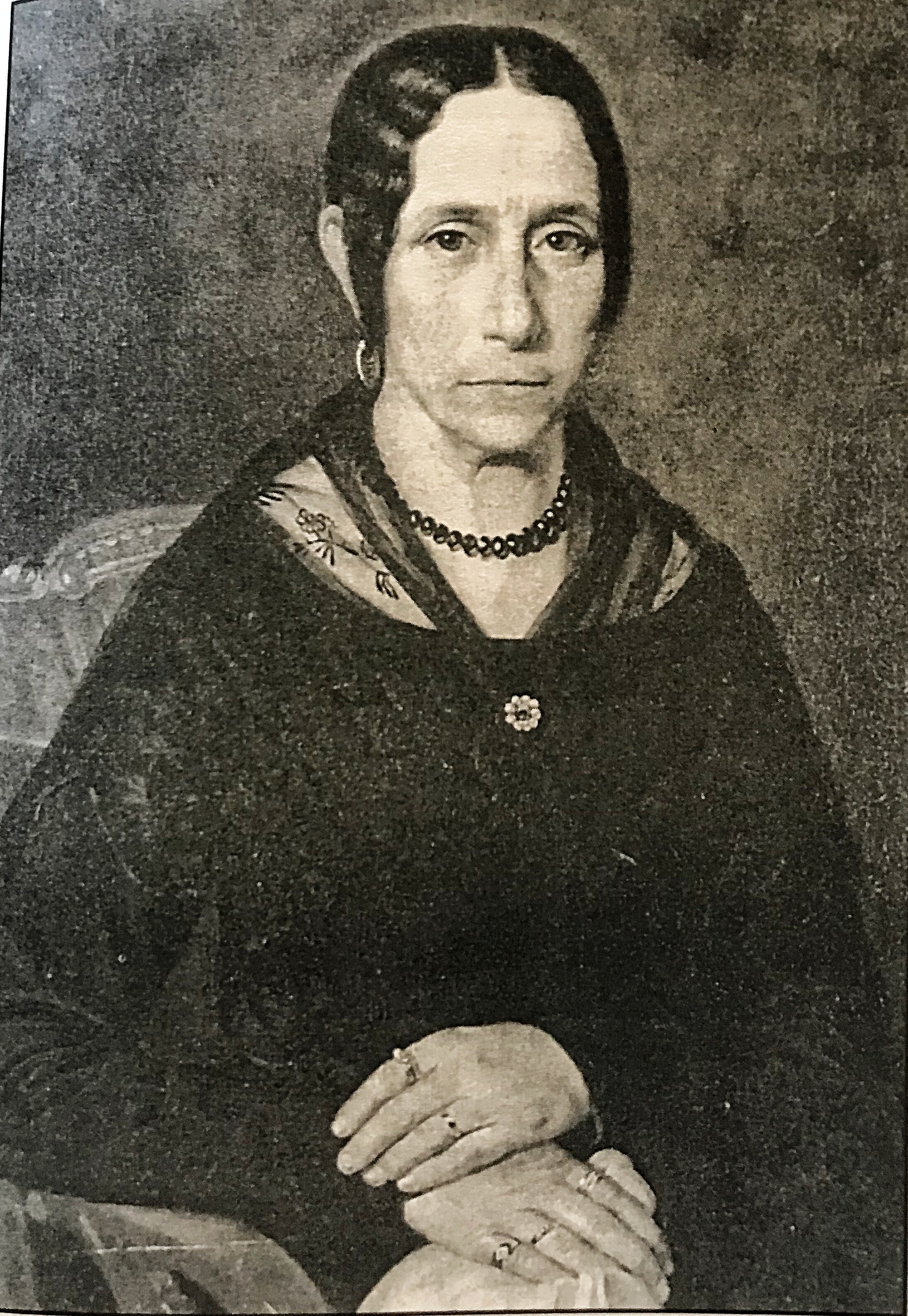
Esteban's wife, Catalina Manzanelli y Ponce de León

At the request of mission priest Father Juan Cabot, also a native of Barcelona, Munrás traveled to Mission San Miguel Arcángel, north of Paso Robles, in the early 1820s. Various religious-themed scenes (known as the "Munrás murals") were painted by the local Salinan Indians under Munrás' direction.

His designs reflected the Neo-Classical tastes of the period, and the reredos (main altarpiece) reflects knowledge of an artist who had seen the fashionably decorated churches in Mexico of that era. The interior has remained untouched and has been preserved in its original state.

Munrás died in 1850 in Monterey. His dying wish was for his wife Catalina Munrás to subdivide their Rancho San Vicente into a town. She went on to found Soledad, California.

== Personal life ==
Esteban Munrás was married to Catalina Manzanelli y Ponce de León. They had children including Concepción Munrás McKee.
