= Rancho San Vicente (Munrás) =

Pre-statehood California land grant

Coordinates: 36.480°N 121.350°W

Rancho San Vicente was a 19,979-acre (80.85 km^{2}) Mexican land grant in the Salinas Valley, in present-day Monterey County, California.

The four square league grant consisted of two square leagues in 1835 by Governor José Castro to Esteban Munrás, and two square leagues granted in 1842 by Governor Juan Alvarado. The grant extended along the east bank of the Salinas River and encompassed present day Soledad.

== History ==
Esteban Munrás (1798–1850) a Spaniard from Barcelona, was a Monterey trader and amateur painter. His wife Catalina Manzanelli de Munrás, the daughter of Maria Casilda Ponce De Leon and Nicolas Manzanelli, a silk merchant from Genoa, Italy, was grantee of Rancho Laguna Seca and Rancho San Francisquito.

With the cession of California to the United States following the Mexican-American War, the 1848 Treaty of Guadalupe Hidalgo provided that the land grants would be honored. As required by the Land Act of 1851, a claim for Rancho San Vicente was filed with the Public Land Commission in 1852, and the grant was patented to the heirs of Esteban Munrás in 1865.

== See also ==
- Mission Nuestra Señora de la Soledad
- Ranchos of California
- List of Ranchos of California
