= Laton, California =

Laton
- census-designated place
- Location in Fresno County and the state of California

- Location in the United States
- Coordinates: 36°26′00″N 119°41′12″W
- Country: United States
- State: California
- County: Fresno

Government
  - State Senator: Anna Caballero (D)
  - State Assembly: Joaquin Arambula (D)
  - U. S. Congress: Adam Gray (D)

Area
  - Total: 2.527 sq mi (6.546 km^{2})
  - Land: 2.527 sq mi (6.546 km^{2})
  - Water: 0 sq mi (0 km^{2}) 0%
- Elevation: 259 ft (79 m)

Population (2020)
  - Total: 1,967
  - Density: 640/sq mi (247/km^{2})
- Time zone: UTC-8 (PST)
  - Summer (DST): UTC-7 (PDT)
- ZIP code: 93242
- Area code: 559
- FIPS code: 06-40746
- GNIS feature IDs: 1660899, 2408585

Laton (/ˈleɪtən/ LAY-tən) is a census-designated place (CDP) in Fresno County, California, United States. The population was 1,967 at the 2020 census, up from 1,824 at the 2010 census. Laton is located 23 miles (37 km) south-southeast of Fresno, at an elevation of 259 feet (79 m).

== Geography ==
According to the United States Census Bureau, the CDP has a total area of 2.5 square miles (6.5 km^{2}), all land.

== History ==
Laton's first post office opened in 1900, having been transferred from Lillis. The name honors Charles A. Laton, who owned the Rancho Laguna de Tache Mexican land grant.

== Demographics ==
Historical population
Census	Pop.	Note	%±
1960	1,052		—
1970	1,071		1.8%
1980	1,100		2.7%
1990	1,415		28.6%
2000	1,236		−12.7%
2010	1,824		47.6%
2020	1,622		−11.1%
U.S. Decennial Census; 1860–1870 1880-1890; 1900 1910 1920; 1930 1940 1950; 1960 1970 1980; 1990 2000 2010; 2020

Laton first appeared as an unincorporated place in the 1960 U.S. census; and as a census designated place in the 1980 United States census.

=== Racial and ethnic composition ===
Laton CDP, California – Racial and ethnic composition Note: the US Census treats Hispanic/Latino as an ethnic category. This table excludes Latinos from the racial categories and assigns them to a separate category. Hispanics/Latinos may be of any race.
Race / Ethnicity (NH = Non-Hispanic)	Pop 2000	Pop 2010	Pop 2020	% 2000	% 2010	% 2020
White alone (NH)	347	409	377	28.07%	22.42%	23.24%
Black or African American alone (NH)	5	3	19	0.40%	0.16%	1.17%
Native American or Alaska Native alone (NH)	7	5	5	0.57%	0.27%	0.31%
Asian alone (NH)	8	4	7	0.65%	0.22%	0.43%
Native Hawaiian or Pacific Islander alone (NH)	0	0	0	0.00%	0.00%	0.00%
Other race alone (NH)	0	1	5	0.00%	0.05%	0.31%
Mixed race or Multiracial (NH)	18	9	15	1.46%	0.49%	0.92%
Hispanic or Latino (any race)	851	1,393	1,194	68.85%	76.37%	73.61%
Total	1,236	1,824	1,622	100.00%	100.00%	100.00%

=== 2020 census ===
As of the 2020 census, Laton had a population of 1,622. The median age was 32.9 years. About 26.3% of residents were under the age of 18 and 12.6% were 65 years of age or older. For every 100 females, there were 110.4 males, and for every 100 females age 18 and over, there were 111.5 males age 18 and over.

As of the 2020 census, 0.0% of residents lived in urban areas and 100.0% lived in rural areas.

There were 489 households, of which 41.9% had children under the age of 18 living in them. Of all households, 54.2% were married-couple households, 17.4% were households with a male householder and no spouse or partner present, and 22.1% were households with a female householder and no spouse or partner present. About 18.2% of all households were made up of individuals and 9.4% had someone living alone who was 65 years of age or older.

There were 506 housing units, of which 3.4% were vacant. The homeowner vacancy rate was 0.0% and the rental vacancy rate was 0.5%.

=== 2010 census ===
The 2010 United States census reported that Laton had a population of 1,967. The population density was 941.5 inhabitants per square mile (363.5/km^{2}). The racial makeup of Laton was 1,001 (54.9%) White, 4 (0.2%) African American, 13 (0.7%) Native American, 10 (0.5%) Asian, 0 (0.0%) Pacific Islander, 744 (40.8%) from other races, and 52 (2.9%) from two or more races. Hispanic or Latino of any race were 1,393 persons (76.4%).

The Census reported that 1,824 people (100% of the population) lived in households, 0 (0%) lived in non-institutionalized group quarters, and 0 (0%) were institutionalized.

Population in 2010: 1,824. Population change since 2000: +47.6% Males: 950 (52.1%) Females: 874 (47.9%)

Median resident age: 29.4 years California median age: 45.6 years

There were 474 households, out of which 254 (53.6%) had children under the age of 18 living in them, 284 (59.9%) were opposite-sex married couples living together, 86 (18.1%) had a female householder with no husband present, 33 (7.0%) had a male householder with no wife present. There were 20 (4.2%) unmarried opposite-sex partnerships, and 9 (1.9%) same-sex married couples or partnerships. 59 households (12.4%) were made up of individuals, and 34 (7.2%) had someone living alone who was 65 years of age or older. The average household size was 3.85. There were 403 families (85.0% of all households); the average family size was 4.12.

The age distribution was 584 people (32.0%) under the age of 18, 211 people (11.6%) aged 18 to 24, 488 people (26.8%) aged 25 to 44, 380 people (20.8%) aged 45 to 64, and 161 people (8.8%) who were 65 years of age or older. The median age was 29.4 years. For every 100 females, there were 108.7 males. For every 100 females age 18 and over, there were 107.7 males.

Estimated median household income in 2021: $28,000 (it was $35,408 in 2000) Laton: $54,118 California: $58,931 Estimated per capita income in 2009: $16,759

Hispanic - 1,393 (76.4%) White alone - 409 (22.4%) Two or more races - 9 (0.5%) American Indian alone - 5 (0.3%) Black alone - 3 (0.2%) Asian alone - 4 (0.2%) Other race alone - 1 (0.05%)

Number of households with income < $10k: Laton: 4.1% (12) State: 5.7% (695,403) Number of households with income $10–20k: Laton: 0.0% (0) State: 10.1% (1,232,937) Number of households with income $20–30k: Laton: 19.4% (56) State: 9.7% (1,186,065) Number of households with income $30–40k: Laton: 4.9% (14) State: 9.1% (1,108,669) Number of households with income $40–50k: Laton: 20.9% (60) State: 8.5% (1,039,666) Number of households with income $50–60k: Laton: 6.9% (20) State: 7.8% (948,345) Number of households with income $60–75k: Laton: 18.1% (52) California: 9.9% (1,206,377) Number of households with income $75–100k: Laton: 10.9% (31) California: 12.7% (1,547,756) Number of households with income $100–125k: Laton: 5.3% (15) State: 8.9% (1,085,712) Number of households with income $125–150k: Laton: 7.5% (22) State: 5.7% (693,943) Number of households with income $150–200k: Laton: 2.1% (6) State: 6.1% (748,264) Number of households with income > $200k: Laton: 0.0% (0) State: 5.9% (721,754)

Estimated median house or condo value in 2009: $153,079 (it was $78,600 in 2000) Laton: $153,079 California: $384,200 Mean prices in 2009: All housing units: $212,839; Detached houses: $213,299; Mobile homes: $195,202

There were 493 housing units at an average density of 254.5 per square mile (98.3/km^{2}), of which 474 were occupied, of which 290 (61.2%) were owner-occupied, and 184 (38.8%) were occupied by renters. The homeowner vacancy rate was 1.4%; the rental vacancy rate was 2.6%. 1,017 people (55.8% of the population) lived in owner-occupied housing units and 807 people (44.2%) lived in rental housing units.

=== 2000 census ===
As of the census of 2000, there were 1,236 people, 331 households, and 285 families residing in the CDP. The population density was 641.4 inhabitants per square mile (247.6/km^{2}). There were 340 housing units at an average density of 176.4 per square mile (68.1/km^{2}). The racial makeup of the CDP was 45.15% White, 0.40% Black or African American, 1.13% Native American, 0.65% Asian, 0.08% Pacific Islander, 49.03% from other races, and 3.56% from two or more races. 68.85% of the population were Hispanic or Latino of any race.

There were 331 households, out of which 49.8% had children under the age of 18 living with them, 64.7% were married couples living together, 15.1% had a female householder with no husband present, and 13.6% were non-families. 10.0% of all households were made up of individuals, and 4.8% had someone living alone who was 65 years of age or older. The average household size was 3.72 and the average family size was 3.96.

The age distribution was 35.9% under the age of 18, 11.7% from 18 to 24, 27.3% from 25 to 44, 18.1% from 45 to 64, and 7.0% who were 65 years of age or older. The median age was 27 years. For every 100 females, there were 100.0 males. For every 100 females age 18 and over, there were 98.5 males.

The median income for a household in the CDP was $35,408, and the median income for a family was $34,688. Males had a median income of $25,125 versus $25,417 for females. The per capita income for the CDP was $9,702. About 14.4% of families and 17.4% of the population were below the poverty line, including 19.7% of those under age 18 and 19.7% of those age 65 or over.

== Education ==
Laton is served by the Laton Joint Unified School District.
