= Rancho San José y Sur Chiquito =

Mexican land grant in California

Coordinates: 36.470°N 121.910°W

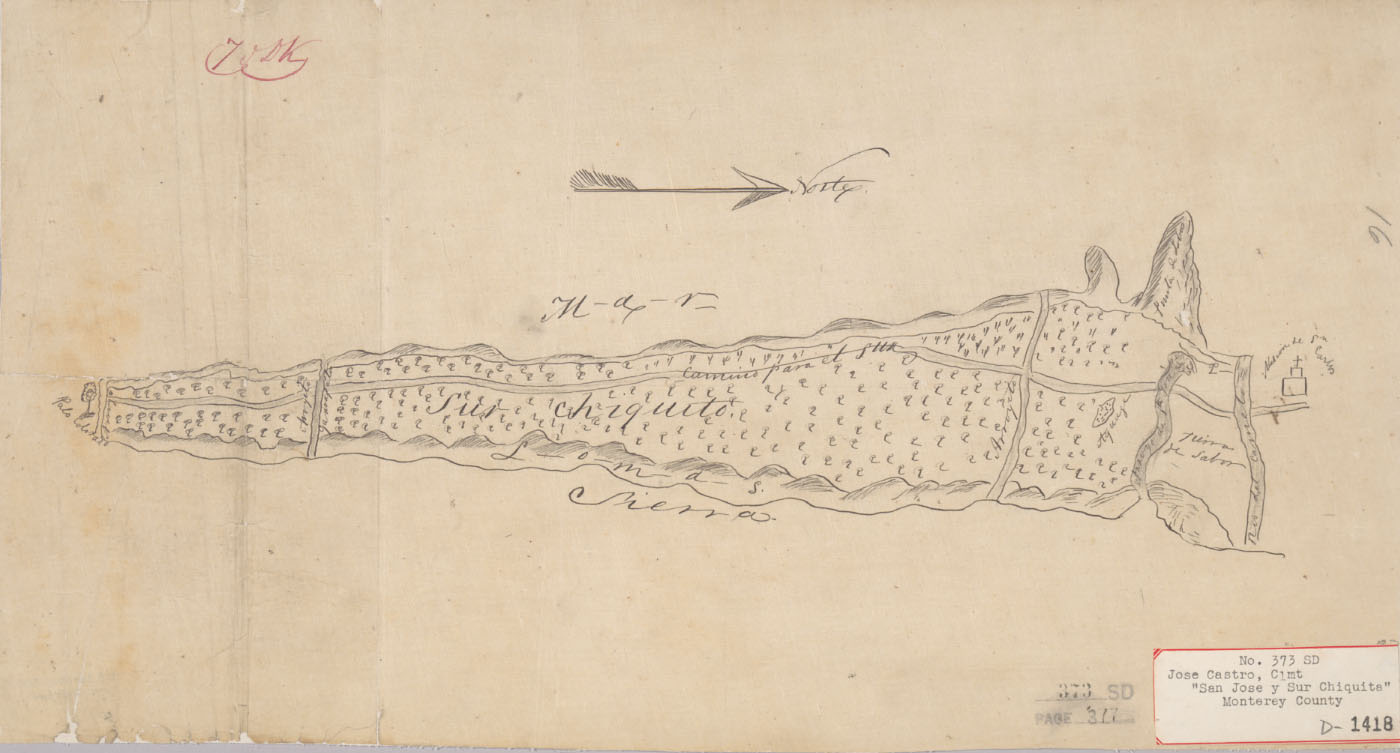
Original hand-drawn diseño (map) of Rancho San José y Sur Chiquito in present-day Big Sur, California.

Rancho San José y Sur Chiquito was a 8,876-acre (35.92 km^{2}) Mexican land grant in present-day Big Sur, in Monterey County, California, given in 1835 to Teodoro Gonzalez and re-granted by Governor Juan Alvarado the same year to Marcelino Escobar. The grant, including Point Lobos, was located south of the Carmel River, extending inland along the coastal mountains, and south along the Pacific coast. It included San Jose Creek, Malpaso Creek, Soberanes Creek, Tres Pinos Creek, Garrapata Creek, and ended on the north side of Palo Colorado Canyon. A hand-drawn map created c. 1853 accompanying the grant indicated a road or trail was already present along the coast.

Two of Escobar's ten children sold the land to Josefa Abrego, who may have been acting for her husband, José Abrego. She later transferred the title to a group of about 10 Mexican soldiers at no cost, who according to legend might have received it in payment of a gambling debt incurred by José Abrego. They gave it to José Castro, their superior officer. When Alta California was ceded to the United States government, Castro was required to prove his title. He submitted a claim in 1853, but he died before it was resolved. His successors were denied the patent claim and appealed the court decision. The other Escobar children attempted to claim their portion of the land, and do did many others. Thirty-two claimants eventually asserted that they owned a portion of the land. Thirty-five years later, in 1886, Castro's successors finally obtained clear title, forcing all other claimants out.

The land was by then used by Chinese, Japanese, Azores, and Anglos for a variety of purposes, including ranching, dairy, farming, mining, whaling, a granite quarry, and an abalone cannery. In 1890, the owners converted their title into stock of the Carmelo Land and Coal Company. When the coal mine failed, the owners submitted a plan for a 1,000 lot subdivision. Alexander Allan bought Point Lobos in 1898 and began efforts to preserve the land against development. One portion was sold by successors to form the existing Carmel Meadows subdivision. In 1933, the State of California bought Point Lobos and formed a state park. Portions of the inland portion of the grant became Garrapata State Park. The A.M. Allan ranch across from Point Lobos was sold to the State of California and has been set aside as a possible future state park.

== History ==
The Ohlone people harvested shellfish including abalone from the waters around Point Lobos. Evidence has been found of seasonal camp sites on the San Jose Creek that indicate the natives inhabited the area for about 2,500 years. The village, named Ichxenta, was occupied until the end of the Carmel Mission era, when the native population was decimated by disease and forced assimilation. There are 19 midden sites within Point Lobos and five sites containing mortar holes used by the natives for grinding acorns and seeds. It's likely that Sebastian Viscaino or some of his soldiers, who camped near the mouth of the Carmel River in 1602–03, may have visited the area to the south. Gaspar de Portolà and his exploring party camped at San Jose Creek in October 1769. Sergeant Jose Francisco Ortega conducted a study of the coast south of the Carmel River. In about 1770, Spanish Vaqueros from the nearby Carmel Mission ran large herds of cattle in the area near Point Lobos.

=== Spanish and Mexican era ===
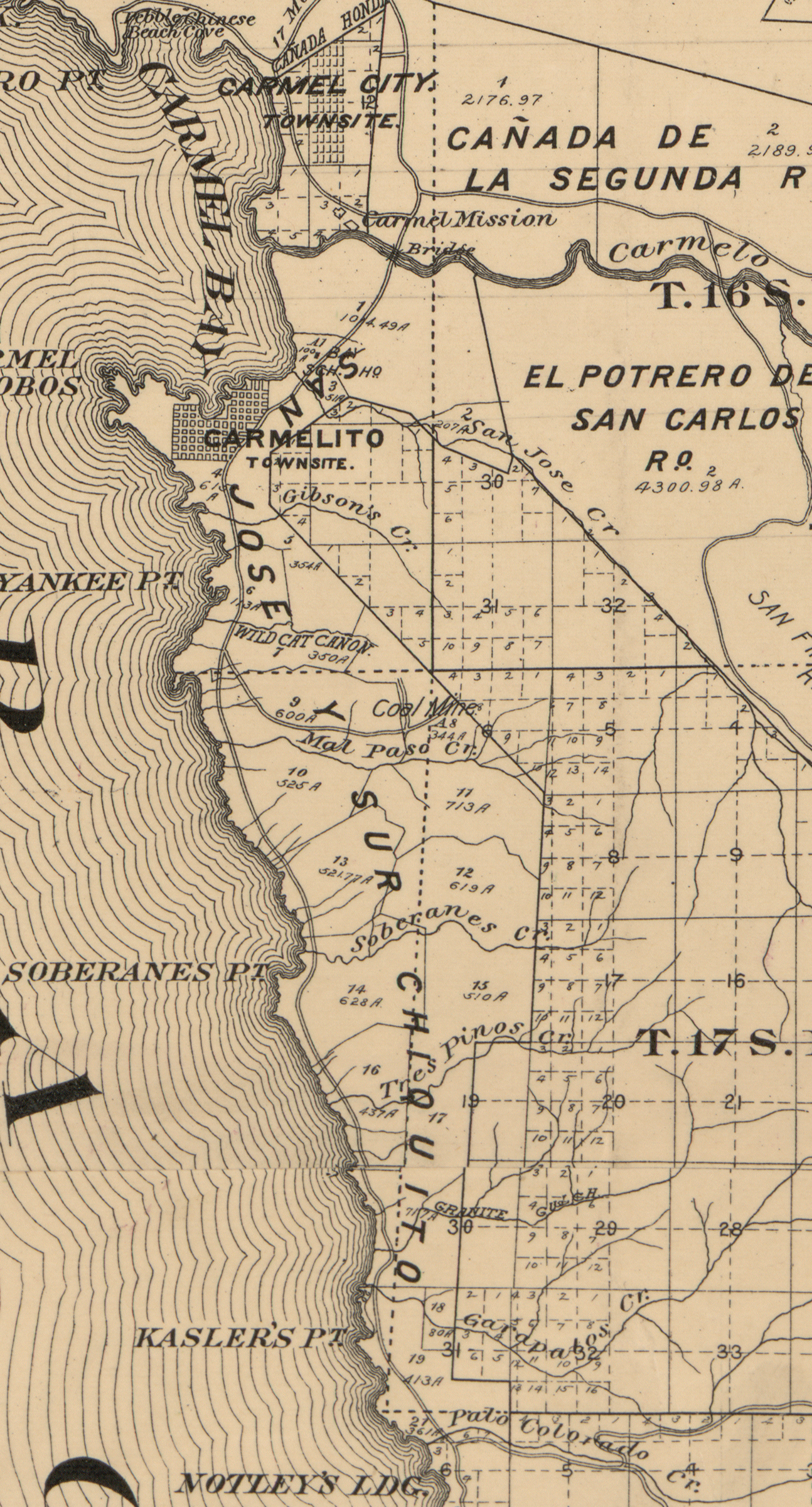
1898 map showing legal boundaries of Rancho San Jose Sur Chiquito following court approval of Castro's claim.

Governor Juan Alvarado granted two square leagues of land in 1839 to Marcelino Escobar, Alcalde (or mayor) of Monterey. It was named for two bodies of water: San José Creek near Point Lobos and El Río Chiquito del Sur.

Two of Escobar's ten children, Juan and Agustin, obtained possession of the rancho shortly afterward, and sold it on August 26, 1841, to Doňa Maria Josefa de Abrego for about three cents an acre. She was the daughter of José Raimundo Estrada (1784–unknown), half-sister of Governor Alvarado, and wife of José Abrego. Abrego had arrived in California in 1834 with the Hijar-Padres Colony. Abrego was granted Rancho Punta de Pinos. She held power of attorney for her husband, José Abrego, to buy and sell land. She paid $250, one-half in silver, and one-half in gold.

She later transferred the title to a group of about 10 Mexican soldiers at no cost, who according to legend might have received it in payment of a gambling debt incurred by José Abrego. They gave it to José Castro, their superior officer. The land changed hands several times under sometimes mysterious circumstances. Under the 1848 Treaty of Guadalupe Hidalgo, the land grants were to be honored. But the Land Act of 1851 established a Public Land Commission that required owners to provide proof of their ownership. The other eight children of the Escobar family sued to gain possession, as did several subsequent buyers.

The settlement of land titles was frequently complicated and lengthy. Mexican officials often did not keep adequate records and sometimes did not provide grantees with any documentation of the grant. Many grants required additional approvals before they were legal. Conditions of the grant required the grantee to live on the land. All of these requirements were rarely fulfilled.

While waiting for his case to be decided, Castro sold his 8,876 acres of land in 1854 to Joseph S. Emery and Abner Bassett for $700, leaving to them the legal fight for ownership. The Public Land Commission denied Castro's claim on August 28, 1855, apparently invalidating Escobar's grant in 1839 and all transactions since then. Castro died in 1860. Emery and Bassett appealed Castro's claim to the United States District Court. Bassett died in 1874, leaving his undivided one-half interest to his wife and eight children. Their half of the rancho was appraised at $15,000.

In 1880, a lawsuit was filed in United States District Court to resolve all of the conflicting claims. After long, complex litigation, the court settled the conflicting ownership claims on June 5, 1882. Subject to the confirmation of the original claim by Castro, they awarded the Ashley heirs one-ninth; W. T. Baggett, who had bought one-half of the Ashley interest, one-ninth; J. S. Emery, two-ninths; Bassett estate, two-ninths; Sidney S. Johnson, two-ninths; and W. Van Dyke, successor to Kopsch, one-ninth. Joseph W. Gregg's claim to the 1,000 acres (400 ha) north of San Jose Creek was also later validated, as were 27 other minor claims, mostly from squatters. The decision divided Escobar's land grant into 34 parcels.

Castro's heirs and successors finally gained clear title to the land on December 24, 1885. President Grover Cleveland signed the land patent on May 4, 1888, 35 years after Castro filed his original claim with the court. All of the 32 claims from the 1880 lawsuit were invalidated as a result.

=== Industrial period ===
In 1851 a Chinese sailor, Quock Junk, ran aground at Point Lobos. He was rescued by members of the Ohlone tribe. He was joined by four or five other families who built cottages at Whaler's Cove. They became the first commercial fishermen at the point. From 1854 to 1858, a granite quarry was operated at what was later named Whaler's Cove. The granite was used to build the Old Monterey Jail, San Francisco Mint, portions of Fort Point, and buildings on the Navy's installation at Mare Island Naval Shipyard.

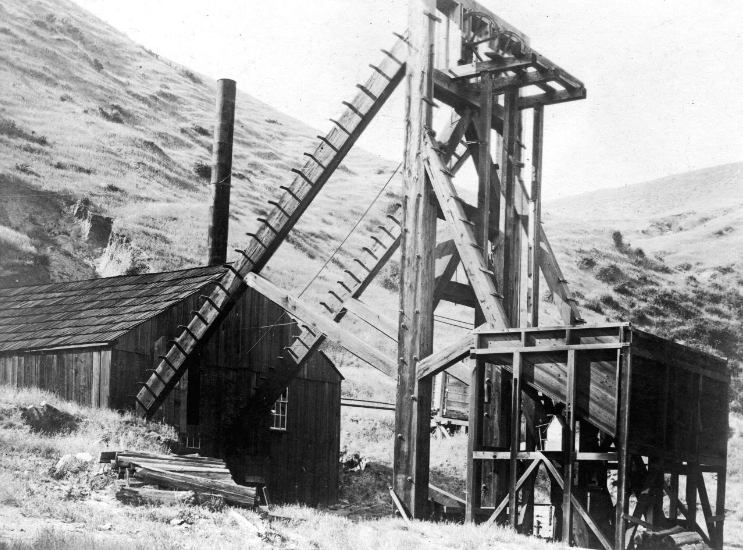
Headstock of the Carmelo Land and Coal Company mine in upper Malpaso Canyon, south of Carmel, California, in 1895.

In 1874, a seam of low grade bituminous coal was found in upper Malpaso Canyon, southeast of Pt Lobos. On September 6, 1888, shortly after the patent for Rancho San Jose y Sur Chiquito was approved, all those excepting Gregg and the squatters banded together to form the Carmelo Land and Coal Company. In exchange for shares in the company, they sold their interest in the land for $1. For the first time in almost half a century, most of Rancho San Jose y Sur Chiquito was reunited under one owner. The company dug an almost 1,000 feet (300 m) long tunnel into the mountain. The coal was found in three veins from 2 to 9 feet (0.61 to 2.74 m) in thickness. The coal was transported on a tramway using ore carts to Coal Chute Point, opposite the Chinese settlement at Whaler's Cove. The deep water allowed the workers to use the chute to deliver the coal directly to coastal steamers.

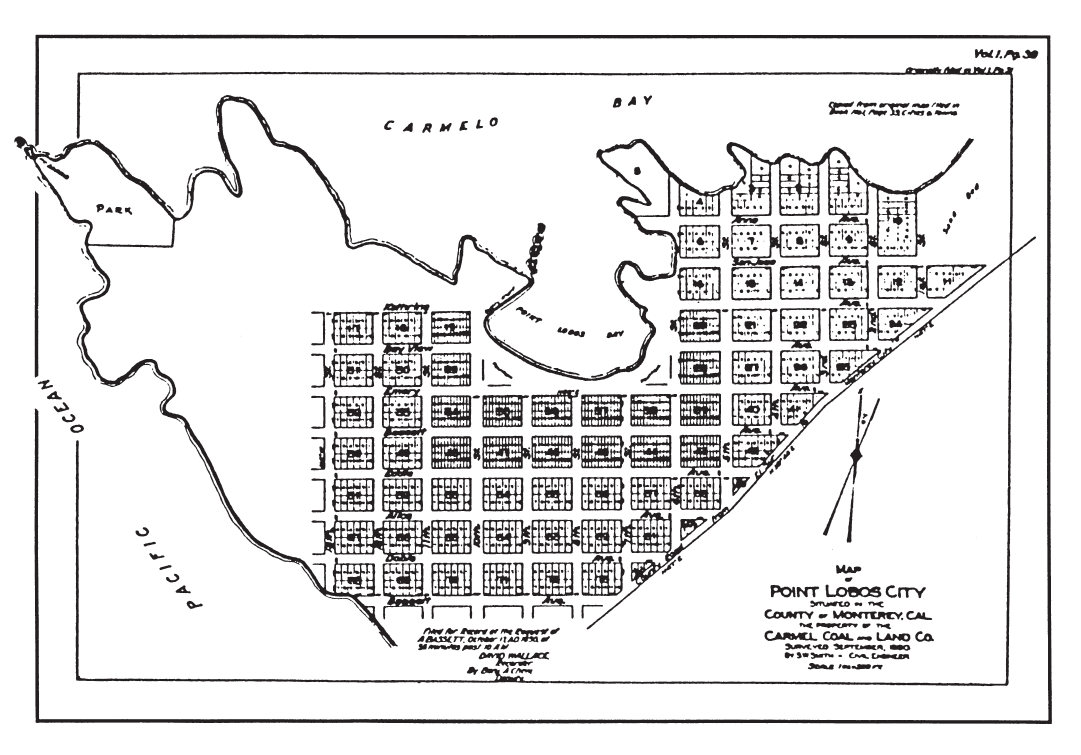
Plot map of planned Point Lobos City, September 1890

By 1890, Joseph Emory and Abner Bassett subdivided the land into 1,000 parcels. They begin selling lots for $25 to $50 to a new town they initially called Point Lobos City, but later renamed Carmelito. The lack of a bridge across the Carmel River and two national economic recessions during the 1890s combined to severely restrict sales. The outer portion of the point was reserved as the Point Lobos Park.

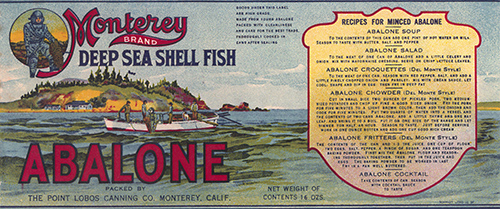
Label from a can of abalone produced by the Point Lobos Canning Company in 1905.

Alexander MacMillan Allan, a successful engineer from Illinois, was hired in 1897 to improve the coal mine operation. When the coal mine proved unprofitable, he purchased 640 acres (260 ha) of Point Lobos from the Carmelo Land and Coal Company in 1898. Marine biologist Gennosuke Kodani was already harvesting abalone from the area, a valuable delicacy in Japan. Allan partnered with him to build the Point Lobos Canning Company, which they operated until 1928. Allan decided to move the remainder of his family from Oakland to Point Lobos.

Allan added a sand and gravel mining operation to the Abalone cannery. In 1899 he had a narrow gauge railroad built from nearby San Jose Beach to Coal Chute Point to transport sand for shipment by sea to glass manufacturers in Alameda. Sand mining continued through 1954. Allan established the Point Lobos Dairy at the mouth of San Jose Creek which was operated from 1903 until 1954. He also became a successful race track architect and built the Santa Anita, Tanforan and Bay Meadows race tracks. One member of the family sold a portion of the land they inherited that became the Carmel Meadows subdivision.

At the beginning of World War II, a U.S. Army Coastal Defense Squad used the whaler's cabin at Whaler's Cove for its headquarters. From 1942 to 1944, the cove was the site of a 4th Air Force Long-Range Radar site. Tents were set up to accommodate 90 men below Rat Hill. In July and August 1943, the U.S. Army established a training school for the 543rd Engineer Boat and Shore Regiment, 3rd Engineer Special Brigade, at Whaler's Cove at Point Lobos. The unit found that the cove was an ideal harbor for anchoring and maintaining their boats. The unit was later involved in 62 landings in the southwest Pacific.

=== Victorine Ranch ===
In 1862, Antonio Victorine, a Portuguese whaler from the Azore islands, arrived at Point Lobos, following the whale population. About fifty to seventy additional people from the Azores settled at Whaler's Cove. The men spotted whales from Whaler's Knoll and then rowed off shore about 1 mile (1.6 km) in 24-foot boats to harpoon the whales. They towed the whales back to Pt. Lobos to fleece and harvest the blubber.

Joseph Emory divided the rancho with the Basset estate. He obtained "two leagues" totaling about 4,400 acres (1,800 ha) on March 7, 1889, including the land from the Carmel River to Sobranes Creek on the south, and from the Pacific Ocean to the coastal mountains on the east. On December 17, 1895, he sold a portion of the land to Joe Victorine, descendant of Antonio Victorine who had founded the whaling community on Point Lobos.

Joe's son Avelino Andrew Victorine and his grandson Walter Bradley Victorine were born on the ranch. Over time the ranch grew to 1,800 acres (730 ha), from south of the Carmel River past San Jose Creek and included all of the Yankee Point area. The ranch extended from the coast along the east side of Highway 1 and over the 1,300 foot (400 m) coastal ridge into Malpaso Creek Canyon.

The family ran cattle on the property. On September 18, 1928, Joe sold 1,146 acres (464 ha) to San Remo Development Company, but they re-conveyed it back to him on May 29, 1935. On July 19, 1948, trustees of the estate sold the same parcel to Charles Sawyer. Sawyer successfully subdivided portions of one parcel on the northwest portion of the ranch and five homes have been built there. He subsequently transferred portions of the land to others, who in a complex series of real estate transactions granted them back to him. The resulting subdivisions created 18 residential lots. On December 24, 1967, actor Clint Eastwood bought five parcels totaling 283 acres (115 ha) of land from Sawyer. In 1967, Eastwood named his production company Malpaso Productions. He later bought more land until he owned 650 acres (260 ha). In 1995, Monterey County bought the land from him for $3.08 million, despite the fact that in July 1994 the county assessor showed the land's assessed value as only $308,682. The county put a permanent conservation easement on the Malpaso property.

The California State Coastal Conservancy bought two parcels of the ranch totaling 100 acres (40 ha) in the 1980s along with land at Kasler Point west of Highway 1. Their goal was to demonstrate the effectiveness of Monterey County's transfer of development credit (TDC) program, which was implemented as part of the 1986 Big Sur Coast Land Use Plan. But after giving up the right to build a home on Kasler Point, the Conservancy was unable to convert the resulting two development credits on Victorine Ranch. The property has three buildable lots. The Conservancy had the land appraised at $6 million. They attempted to auction the development credits and the land in 2013. They sold the two TDC for $50,000 and $75,000, but failed to receive bids meeting the minimum asking price for the land.

== Conservation uses ==
Allan and his wife Satie appreciated the natural beauty of the point and were concerned about the growing number of visitors who wanted to see the rare Monterey Cypress trees and scenic coastline. In 1899, they put up toll gates, prohibited camping, and charged visitors 50 cents a vehicle (about $10 today) to enter the point. Allan bought some of the lots that had been subdivided and later got the subdivisions removed from the county record.

=== Garrapata State Park ===
William B. Post acquired two 160 acres (65 ha) parcels and lived on the land between 1858 and 1866. In 1867 he sold his land to David Castro, who sold it the following year to Ezequiel Soberanes. Soberanes operated a prosperous cattle and sheep ranch for 24 years. The Soberanes family, locally famed for their musical talents, also offered their hospitality to others traveling along the coast, as was the custom. Francis Doud, an early Monterey resident, purchased the Soberanes land and other parcels in 1891 to create the Doud Ranch, which ran cattle until the early 1950s. The family's wood-frame ranch house burned to the ground in the 1960s. The State acquired its first parcel of the property in 1980; Garrapata (Spanish for tick) was classified a state park in 1985.

=== Point Lobos ===
Scientists reported to the government that the Carmel area including Point Lobos was the "most picturesque spot on the Pacific Coast." In 1925, Point Lobos figured prominently in discussions for inclusion in the new state park system. Members of the Sierra Club and the Save the Redwoods League discussed preserving Point Lobos and Cypress Point as national parks or reserves. Duncan McDuffie of the Save-the-Redwoods League hired the internationally known landscape architect Frederick Law Olmsted to research Point Lobos and report on the areas most noteworthy of preservation. Olmsted's report described Point Lobos as "the most outstanding example on the coast of California of picturesque rock and surf scenery in combination with unique vegetation, including typical Monterey cypress." Point Lobos gained the attention of the newly established California State Park system, who considered taking the land using eminent domain. The family persuaded the state to wait until Allan died.

Allan initially resisted the idea of making the land a public park. But on February 8, 1933, three years after Allan's death, the Allan family sold 348 acres (141 ha) to the State of California for $631,000. The state promptly set about erasing evidence of human intrusion on the land, removing man-made structures like the abalone cannery, the railroad used to haul sand, and a number of homes and shacks, excepting a single fisherman's cabin. The Allan family donated an additional 15 acres (6.1 ha) to the state of cypress-covered headlands at the western tip of the point as a memorial grove to Alexander and Satie Morgan Allan. The state added another 50 acres (20 ha) later on, expanding the reserve to almost 400 acres (160 ha). The Allan family retained the land to the east of Highway 1. Eunice Riley, one of Alexander's three daughters, repurchased the last subdivided lots in the 1950s. In 1960, 750 acres (300 ha) underwater acres were added as the first marine reserve in the United States. The marine reserve was designated an ecological reserve in 1973, and in 1992, was added to the Monterey Bay National Marine Sanctuary, the largest in the nation.

=== Lobos-Corona Parklands Project ===
In 2004, the Palo Corona Ranch, formerly known as the Fish Ranch, was put on the market for $55 million. The 9,898 acres (4,006 ha) property stretches southeast about 11 miles (18 km) from the Carmel River south to the Los Padres National Forest. Environmentalists were concerned that it would be converted to an estate-type development like that done for Rancho San Carlos (later named the Santa Lucia Preserve) next to the Palo Corona Ranch. In May 2002, the Big Sur Land trust and The Nature Conservancy joined to buy the Ranch.

The southern "Back Country" range of 5,500 acres (2,226 ha) was sold to the California Department of Fish and Game, which added it the existing 640 acres (260 ha) Joshua Creek Ecological Preserve. It is protected in perpetuity for public conservation and parkland. The Monterey Peninsula Regional Park District used the northern 4,350 acres (1,760 ha) to create the Palo Corona Regional Park. Due to budget constraints and right-of-way limitations, the district was only able to open the 681 acres (276 ha) front parcel to the public, and only on a limited basis. As of May 2018, access is restricted on a limited permit system. Due to a limited right-of-way and limitations imposed by the California Coastal Commission, only 21 access permits are available daily, 13 for the Highway 1 entrance, or eight permits for entrance from the South Bank Trail. Visitors must apply at least two weekdays in advance.

The Park district and the DPR have joined to purchase the remaining 2,088-acre middle portion of the ranch from The Nature Conservancy and the Big Sur Land Trust for its appraised value of $10.2 million.

The non-profits bought land from telecommunications millionaire Craig McCaw. They paid $32 million, $8 million less than the final asking price. The land consists of coastal grasslands and woodland, ponds, and perennial creeks. The "front range" portion of the ranch at the mouth of the Carmel River had been originally owned by Joseph W. Gregg when Castro's patent was approved. Craig McCaw bought it and seven other properties.

=== Allan Ranch ===
In 1993, the Big Sur Land Trust bought 1,315 acres (532 ha) of land southeast of Point Lobos from members of the Allen family, who had attempted to develop the land for a private condominium-and-hotel development. The trust paid $11.1 million for the land which was named the Point Lobos Ranch. The ranch, including 2.5 miles (4.0 km) of San Jose Creek (a steelhead stream habitat) and the first Coastal Redwood forest south of Carmel, occupied land from south of Carmel to south of Point Lobos. They continued to run a dairy and beef cattle operation on the land until 1954.

The family as the Whisler and Wilson Family Trusts retained ownership of 317 acres (128 ha) of land about 1.5 miles (2.4 km) east of Highway 1 where the historic family home was located. The Whisler-Wilson Ranch was the last piece of the ranch owned by descendants of Alexander Allen. In 2003, they sold the land to the Big Sur Land Trust for $4 million. The land contains one of the world's largest native Monterey pine forests, endangered Gowen cypress, and rare maritime chaparral plant community.

In 2013, the Big Sur Land Trust sold the land for $4 million to the Monterey Peninsula Regional Park District. The ranch has an easement over the Point Lobos Ranch and road to Highway 1. It connects Palo Corona Regional Park to Point Lobos Ranch. The park district reported that it is preparing to make the land accessible to the public. As of May 2018, access to the northern 600 acres (240 ha) is restricted, and there is no access to the remainder. Although owned by a public agency and purchased with public funds, the public is not yet allowed to access the property.

A consortium of local agencies and non-profits signed a memorandum of understanding in 2017 that they will work together to open up the connected properties to the public. The Allen Ranch is key to the plan, as it makes it possible to add parking that has otherwise been impossible to build. As of 2018, Point Lobos has only 150 on-site parking spaces. Visitors must often park on the shoulder of Highway 1 and sometimes cross it to enter Point Lobos.
