= Joseph Yves Limantour =

French merchant (1812–1885)

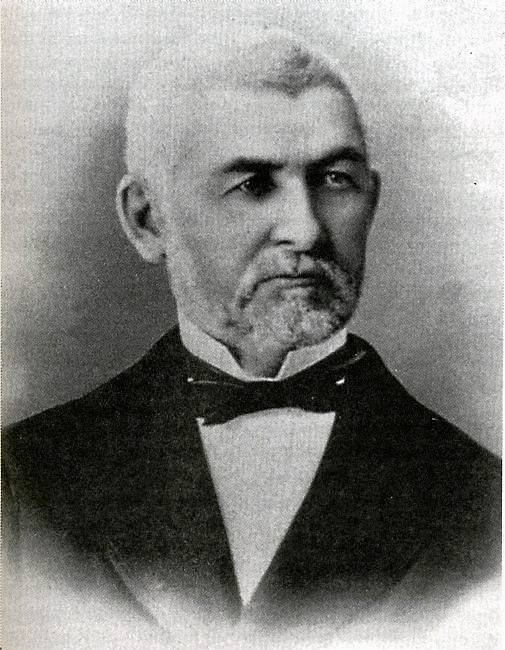
Joseph Yves Limantour

Joseph Yves Limantour (1812 – 1885) was a French-Mexican merchant who engaged in the California sea trade during the years preceding American occupation of that Mexican province in 1846. He was also known in California as José Limantour.

== Life ==
Limantour was born in 1812, in Ploemeur, France.

Limantour was a ship captain and Breton trader. He arrived in Veracruz in 1831, and was based after 1836 in Mexico City. He traded all along the Pacific coast from Valparaíso to California. Limantour Beach in Marin County, California bears his name because he wrecked his schooner, the Ayacucho, on Point Reyes in October 1841. Although much of the cargo was saved, Limantour was stranded in California with no means of transport. During his time in northern California, Limantour sold his cargo for cash and credit to the local elite, but the value of the Ayucucho’s cargo far exceeded the local capacity for purchase. General Mariano Guadalupe Vallejo, Commander General of California, was a major exception and he owned Rancho Suscol in Sonoma with plenty of cattle.

Joseph Gale and his company from the Oregon Country wanted cattle to drive back up north, and Limantour wanted a schooner. In a three-way deal, Vallejo purchased the Gale's schooner Star of Oregon for 350 cows, and then transferred ownership to Limantour.

== Limantour land claims ==
Limantour supplied the Mexican government of Governor Manuel Micheltorena with goods and loans, Limantour said often in exchange for land grants. Mexican government records were often incomplete and not well documented. Limantour offered as proof a grant signed by Micheltorena in Los Angeles on February 27, 1843. A clerk named Vicente P. Gomez said he went to the Recorder's office in the former state capital of Monterey at the request of José Castro to find papers relevant to a property owned by Castro. There he accidentally found the original Mexican espediente, or packet of documents with official seals and signatures, in the Recorder of Monterey's office in 1853. He said José Abrego advised him to take a copy, which he did.

Vicente Gomez had previously claimed during 1853 four leagues of land in his name through his attorney, Pacificus Ord. When the board of land commissioners denied his claim, he appealed to the United States District Court in San Francisco. The US District Attorney, who happened to be Pacificus Ord, represented to the Appeals Court that Gomez claim was valid, and they sustained his appeal. The case made its way to the US Supreme Court in 1859, where evidence was introduced that Gomez had conveyed half of the land to Ord. The Supreme Court voided the claim.

=== Claims approved ===
In 1853, Limantour filed claims at the Public Land Commission for 47 square leagues (200,000 acres) of Mexican land grants. The claims included eighty square leagues of Cape Mendocino; Tiburon peninsula, the Farallones, Alcatraz; four square leagues of San Francisco (all the land south of California Street); Rancho Ojo de Agua; the eleven square league Rancho Laguna de Tache; the eleven square league Rancho Cienega del Gabilan; the eleven square league Rancho Lupyomi; and the six square leagues Rancho Cahuenga. A week later he added claims to additional lands in Northern and Southern California, totaling 924.34 square miles, or 594,783 acres (240,700 ha). In January, 1856, the three members of the United States Land Commission agreed with Limantour's claims to San Francisco, and the next week, granted him the claims north of San Francisco as well. Unsurprisingly, everyone who believed they owned land on which he now held legal title to were extremely upset. Limantour began accepting quitclaim payments from land-owners in San Francisco, collecting according to his detractors between $200,000 and $250,000, assessed at 10 per cent of property value.

=== Documents proved fraudulent ===
Suspicions were soon aroused about the truthfulness of the claims. Two studies completed soon after California became a state, the first by Captain Henry W. Halleck, and the second by William Carey Jones, a lawyer and linguist, had not found Limantour's grants. Limantour had never occupied the land, and never before presented a claim. A former business associate of Limantour's named Auguste Jouan publicly claimed Limantour was a fraud. Jouan wrote that François Jacomet told him Emile Letanneur had forged the papers. Jacomet corroborated the falsehood at first, but was later found to have gone into a court in Mexico where he swore he knew nothing about any fraud. Letanneur was summoned to appear, and initially confirmed the story of fraud, but then he too recanted. A grand jury indicted Limantour for criminal fraud and perjury. The U.S. government secured $70,000 (about $2,604,808 today) in funding to secure Letanneur's conviction. Edwin M. Stanton was hired as special counsel for a $25,000 fee. The Recorder and Deputy Clerk in the Recorders Office in Monterey during the period Gomez said he found the espediente testified he had never seen any such document. He said that Gomez was the first person to tell him of Limantour's claims, and that Gomez told him Abrego was involved, but that Gomez thought the claim was fraudulent. A box of Mexican financial records were coincidentally located at the United States Armory in Benicia, California. Among the papers were Treasurer José Abrego's account books.

Archivist R. C. Hopkins testified that all of the items and entries by Abrego in the records were witnessed with his signature, and sometimes the signature of the recipient. Monthly and yearly balance sheets were examined and audited by the Governor or another officer. He testified that all of the disbursements were numbered as were the accompanying receipts. There were no entries of credits and charges in opposite columns as Abrego had testified, no charge in the books against Micheltorena in the amount of $70,000 or $80,000, or of any other amount. Hopkins told the court that there was no charge to Limantour and credit to Micheltorena for a certificate for lands in Upper and Lower California for more than $6,000 nor any reference to any such item. He told the court that he found no transactions between Limantour and Micheltorena.

=== Limantour arrested, flees to Mexico ===
United States Attorney Delia Torre presented additional evidence that the Limantour documents were fraudulent. He introduced a series of photographic enlargements that compared the Limantour documents side-by-side with land-grant documents of known authenticity. It was obvious that the lettering and the official seals on the Limantour papers were significantly different from the others. On November 19, 1858, Limantour's claims were determined in Federal court to be fraudulent. Limantour was arrested in December 1857, but posted bail and fled to Mexico.

== Later life ==
He was married to Adele Marquet, and their son, José Yves Limantour, was Secretary of Finance of Mexico from 1893-1911. Joseph Y. Limatour died in Mexico City in 1885.
