= Rancho Laguna Seca =

Mexican land grant in California

Coordinates: 36.580°N 121.780°W

Rancho Laguna Seca was a 2,179-acre (8.82 km^{2}) Mexican land grant in present-day Monterey County, California given in 1834 by Governor José Figueroa to Catalina M. Munrás. "Laguna Seca" means "Dry Lake" in Spanish, referring to the seasonal lake, Laguna Seca. The grant was east of present-day Monterey.

== History ==
The half square league grant was made to Catalina Manzanelli de Munrás who was the wife of Esteban Munrás (1798–1850) a Monterey trader, amateur painter, and a grantee of Rancho San Vicente. Catalina Manzanelli de Munras was also grantee of Rancho San Francisquito.

With the cession of California to the United States following the Mexican–American War, the 1848 Treaty of Guadalupe Hidalgo provided that the land grants would be honored. As required by the Land Act of 1851, a claim for Rancho Laguna Seca was filed with the Public Land Commission in 1852, and the grant was patented to Catalina Munrás in 1865.

Frank Bishop acquired the ranch from the Munras family in 1953; the Bishop family raised Thoroughbred horses and developed some of the land. They divested the last of their holdings in the 1990s.

== Geography and drainage ==
On the property a prominent ridge of terrain exists that extends in an east-northeasterly direction to eventually reach Fort Ord. On the south side of this ridge, drainage and groundwater flow is to the south. Surface water flows into the Carmel River, which parallels State Route 68. A series of surface drainage ditches and gullies run south from the higher terrain of Fort Ord to join this flow. Berwick and Canada de la Ordena Canyons also exist on the south and southeast portions of the Laguna Seca Ranch. Berwick Canyon almost borders the eastern side, one-quarter of a mile (400 m), while Buckeye Canyon parallels the eastern border less than one-tenth of a mile (160 m) off the ranch to the east.

== See also ==
- Laguna Seca Raceway
