= Rancho Laguna de Tache (Limantour) =

Purported Mexican land grant in 1843, now in California, USA

Coordinates: 36.370°N 119.630°W

Rancho Laguna de Tache was a Mexican land grant in present day Tulare County, Fresno County and Kings County, California claimed to have been given in 1843 by Governor Manuel Micheltorena to Joseph Yves Limantour. The grant extended along the (left) south bank of the Kings River and was bounded on the south Cross Creek, on the east by the Sierra Nevada, and on the west by Tulare Lake. The land claim was rejected. This grant is separate from the grant of the same name on the North side of Kings River later given to Manuel Castro.

== History ==
Limantour, a Frenchman by birth and a Mexican by choice, became notorious for his fraudulent claims of land grants in California from Governor Micheltorena. Limantour claimed to have been granted eleven square leagues.

With the cession of California to the United States following the Mexican-American War, the 1848 Treaty of Guadalupe Hidalgo provided that the land grants would be honored. As required by the Land Act of 1851, a claim for this Laguna de Tache was filed with the Land Commission, which rejected it.
