= Monterey County Sheriff's Office =

Law enforcement agency in California, US

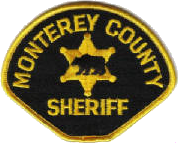
- Patch of the Monterey County Sheriff's Office

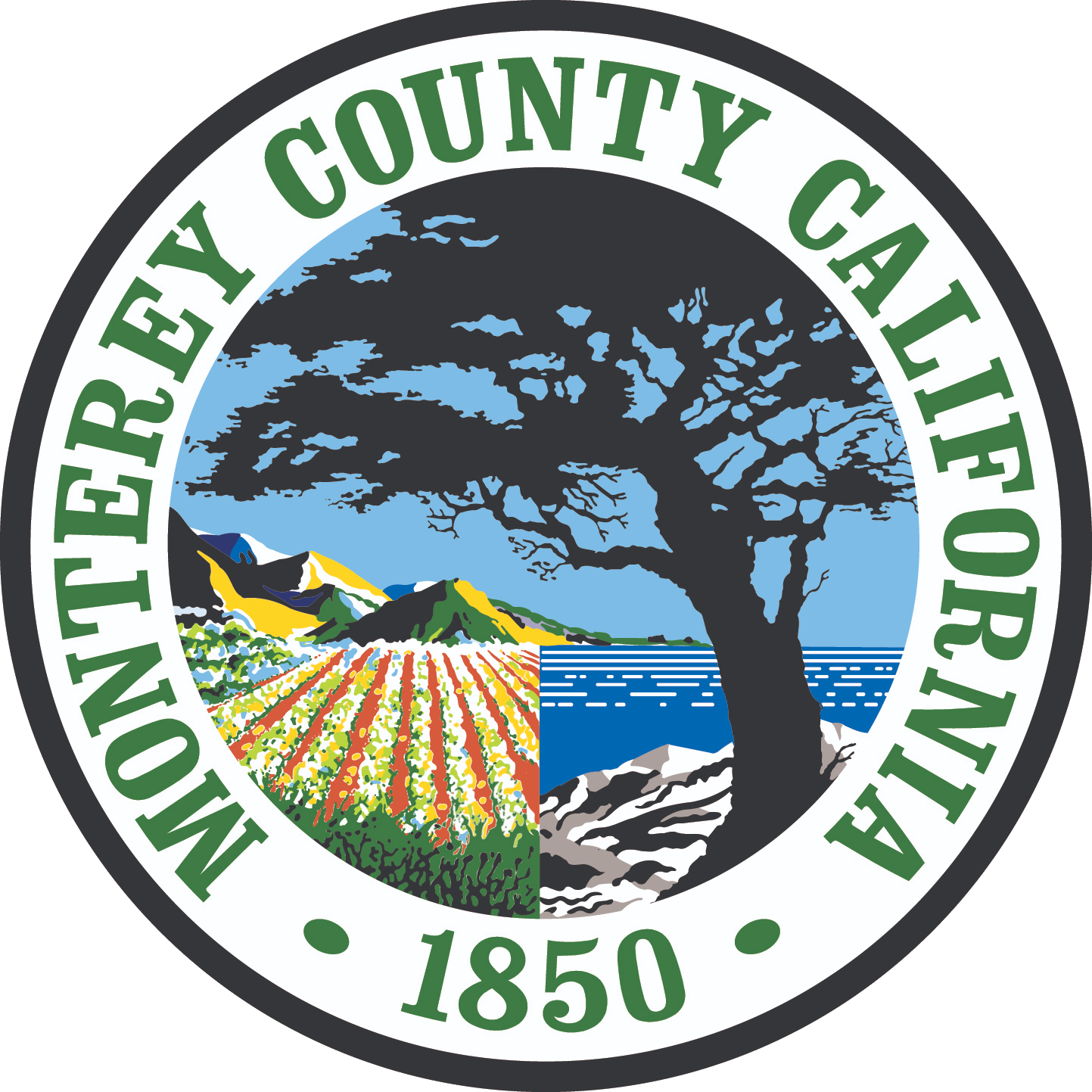
- Seal of Monterey County, California
- Abbreviation: MCSO

Agency overview
- Formed: 1850; 176 years ago
- Employees: 300
- Annual budget: 165 million

Jurisdictional structure
- Operations jurisdiction: Monterey, California, U.S.
- Legal jurisdiction: Monterey County, California

Operational structure
- Headquarters: 1414 Natividad Road Salinas, California 93906
- Deputies: 250
- Civilian employees: 50
- Sheriff responsible: Tina M. Nieto, Sheriff

Facilities
- Jails: 1

Website
- Official Site

The Monterey County Sheriff's Office is the county law enforcement agency for Monterey County, California. It provides protection and law enforcement to the non-municipal areas of Monterey County. The Sheriff's Office has about 300 employees and a budget of over 50 million dollars.

== History ==
The Sheriff's Office was founded in 1850; and as such the department is one hundred and seventy-three years old. The Sheriff's Office is one of the oldest law enforcement agencies in the state of California.

In 2014, a federal judge issued an injunction against Sheriff Scott Miller barring him from campaigning in uniform.

In October 2022, the League of United Latin American Citizens stated that four victims had asked for support with sexual harassment complains against the office, and called for an oversight board. Also in October, two senior officers were terminated, one for unearned overtime, and one for receiving stolen prescription drugs.

Tina Nieto was elected the county's first Latina sheriff in November 2022 and became the first Latina sheriff for the State of California in when she was sworn in December 2022 .

== List of Monterey County Sheriffs ==
- 1. William Roach 1850–1853
- 2. Aaron Lyons 1854–1855
- 3. John B. Keating 1856–1857
- 4. Henry DeGraw 1858–1859
- 5. Aaron E. Lyons 1860–1864 (Died in office)
- 6. James B. Smith 1864–1865
- 7. Thomas Watson 1866–1871
- 8. Andrew Wesson 1872–1873
- 9. James B. Smith 1874–1875
- 10. James E. Graves 1876–1877
- 11. John C. Franks 1878–1882
- 12. James E. Graves 1883–1888
- 13. James A. Horton 1889–1892
- 14. John L. Matthew 1893–1898
- 15. Henry R. Farley 1899–1899 (Killed in office)
- 16. Melvin R. Keef 1899–1902
- 17. William J. Nesbitt 1902–1923
- 18. William A. Oyer 1924–1927
- 19. Carl H. Abbott 1928–1940 (Died in office)
- 20. J. A. Cornett* 1940–1940
- 21. Alexander H. Bordges 1940–1946 (Died in office)
- 22. J. A. Cornett* 1946–1946
- 23. Jack L. McCoy 1946–1957
- 24. Victor V. Tibbs 1957–1963
- 25. William J. Davenport 1963–1979
- 26. David B. "Bud" Cook 1979–1991
- 27. Norman G. Hicks 1991–1999
- 28. Gordon Sonne 1999–2003
- 29. Mike Kanalakis 2003–2010
- 30. Scott Miller 2011–2014
- 31. Steve Bernal 2015–2022
- 32. Tina Nieto 2022–present*
- J. A. Cornett (coroner) served as interim Sheriff after deaths in office of Sheriff Abbott and Bordges until new elections could be held.

== List of fallen deputies ==
- 1. Monterey County Constable William Hardmont, September 2, 1854
- 2. Deputy Jose Joaquin Carmen Santiago de la Torre, November 10, 1855
- 3. Deputy Charles Layton, November 10, 1855
- 4. Sheriff Henry Reed Farley, September 18, 1899
- 5. Special Deputy Noah Horace Rader, July 6, 1925
- 6. Deputy Craig Lingley Knox, June 1, 1980
- 7. Deputy Jerralee Jane Jacobus, June 1, 1980
- 8. Deputy Robert "Bob" Jefferson Shaw IV, April 9, 1988
- 9. Deputy Anthony "Tony" James Olson, September 24, 1996
