= Rancho Johnson =

Mexican land grant in Yuba County, California

Coordinates: 39.040°N 121.410°W

Rancho Johnson (or Johnson's Ranch) was a 22,197-acre (89.83 km^{2}) Mexican land grant in present-day Yuba County, California, given in 1844 by Governor Manuel Micheltorena to Pablo Gutiérrez. The grant was located along the north side of Bear River, and encompassed present-day Wheatland.

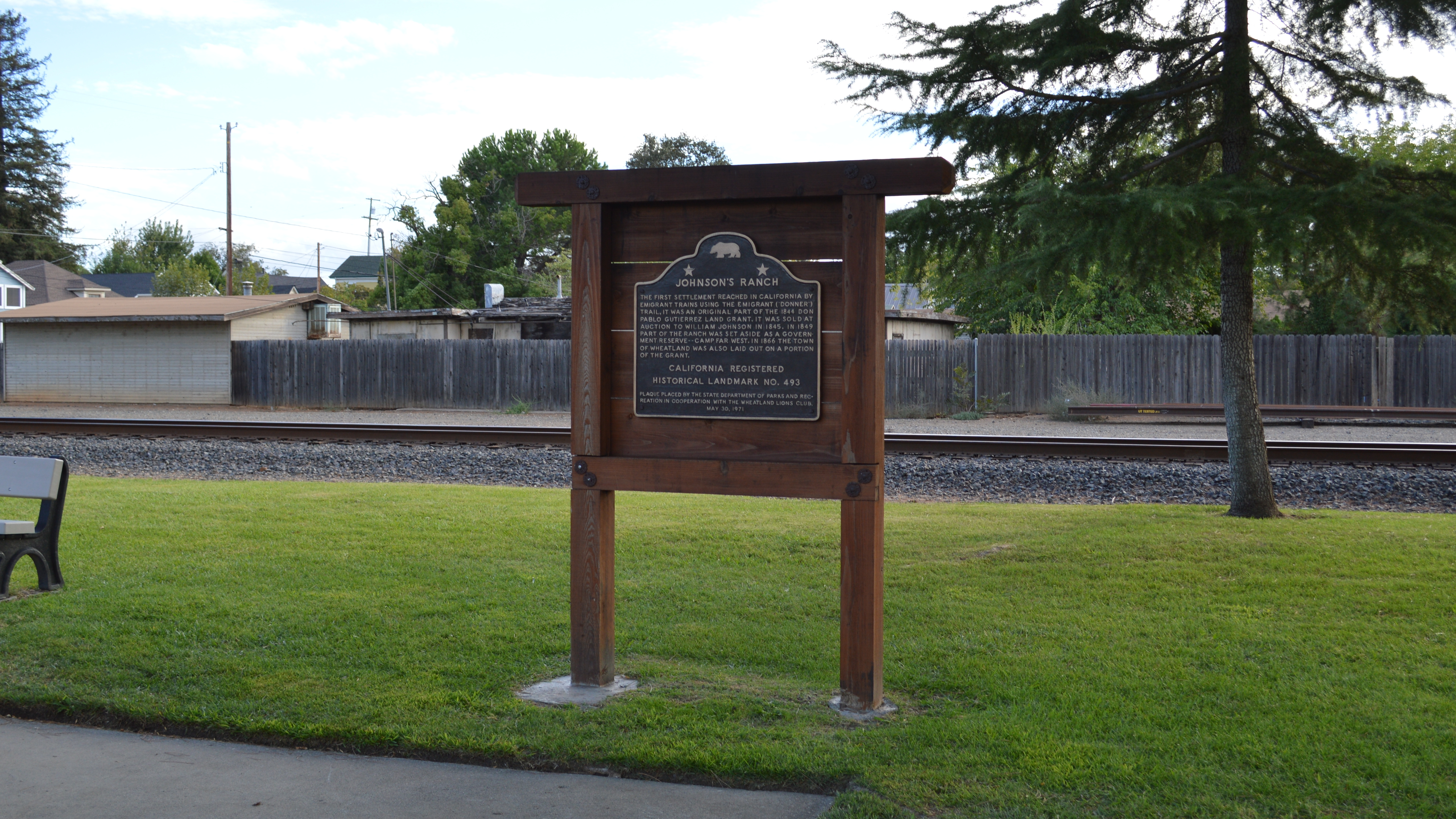
Johnson's Ranch Historical Plaque

== History ==
In 1844, Pablo Gutiérrez (died 1845), a Mexican who had worked for John Sutter since Santa Fe, was awarded the five-square-league land grant. As required, Gutiérrez built an adobe house (at the place afterwards called Johnson's Crossing). Gutiérrez was killed in 1845, and his property sold at auction by Sutter, as magistrate of the region, to William Johnson and his partner Sebastian Keyser (Kayser). Johnson took the east half of the grant, and Keyser the west. In 1846, they built an adobe house a short distance below Johnson's Crossing. Johnson's Rancho, as it came to be called, was the last stop on the California Trail to Sutter's Fort. Seven members of the ill-fated Donner Party staggered into this ranch in 1847, seeking help for those left in the snowbound Sierra Nevada Mountains. In 1846, Johnson's house was described by the emigrant party of Edwin Bryant as a small building of two rooms, one-half constructed of logs and the other of adobe, surrounded by several livestock pens made of poles and pickets.

William Johnson (d.1863) was an English sailor out of Boston who for several years previous to this purchase, had traded between Hawaii and San Francisco. In 1847, Johnson married Mary Murphy (1831–1867), a survivor of the Donner Party, but they were soon divorced. In 1848, Mary married Charles Covillaud, owner of nearby Rancho Honcut, who named Marysville for her. In 1849, Johnson sold his share in the ranch to James Kyle, Jonathan B. Truesdale, James Emory, and William Cleveland, and went to Hawaii. Truesdale sold his interest to Cleveland, Kyle, and James Imbrie, who then sold to Eugene Gillespie and Henry E. Robinson.

Sebastian Keyser (d.1850), born in Austria, was a trapper who had accompanied Sutter in 1838 from Missouri, through New Mexico to California. Keyser went to Oregon but returned in 1841 to work for Sutter at his Rancho New Helvetia. Keyser was also the grantee of Rancho Llano Seco. In 1845, he settled on the Bear River as a half-owner of Rancho Johnson, and married Elizabeth Rhoads. Keyser sold his interest in the rancho to Eugene Gillespie and Henry E. Robinson in 1849. Keyser then operated a ferry on the Cosumnes River, where he drowned in 1850.

In 1849, Henry Robinson and Eugene Gillespie, who had title to the whole Rancho Johnson grant, laid out a town called Kearny, in honor of General Kearny. However the venture failed, and the town was never settled.

With the cession of California to the United States following the Mexican-American War, the 1848 Treaty of Guadalupe Hidalgo provided that the land grants would be honored. As required by the Land Act of 1851, a claim for Rancho Johnson was filed with the Public Land Commission in 1852, and the grant was patented to William Johnson in 1857.

== California Historical Landmark ==
The Johnson's Ranch is a California Historical Landmark number 493 .

California Historical Landmark number 493 reads:

NO. 493 JOHNSON'S RANCH - The first settlement reached in California by emigrant trains using the Emigrant ('Donner') Trail, this was an original part of the 1844 Don Pablo Gutierrez land grant. It was sold at auction to William Johnson in 1845, and in 1849 part of the ranch was set aside as a government reserve-Camp Far West. In 1866, the town of Wheatland was laid out on a portion of the grant.

== See also ==
- California Historical Landmarks in Monterey County
- California Historical Landmarks in Yuba County, California
- History of California through 1899

== California Historical Landmark ==
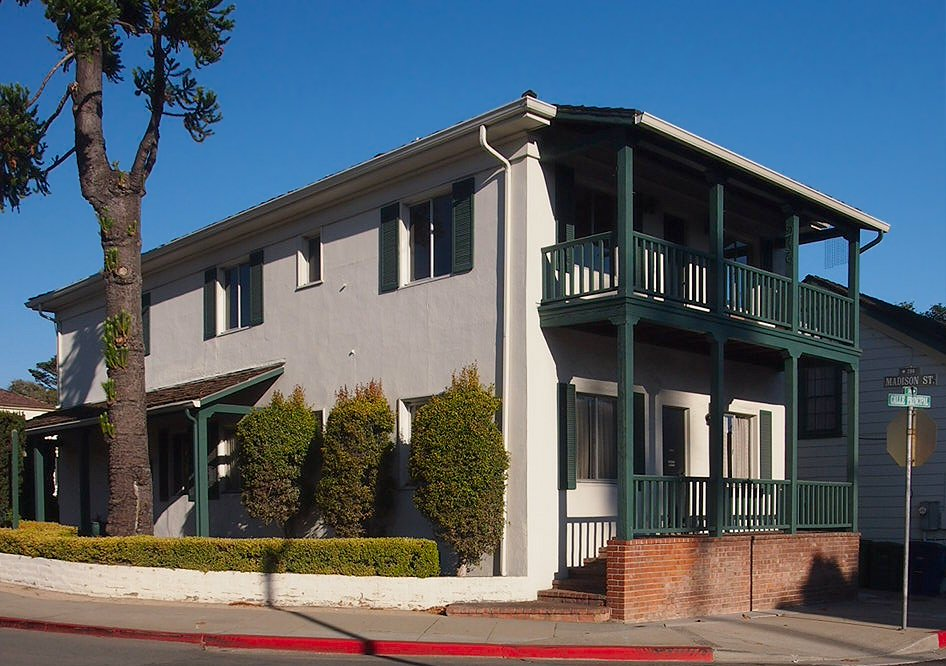
Casa Gutierrez

The place of Gutiérrez Adobe is California Historical Landmark number #713.

California Historical Landmark reads:

NO. 713 GUTIÉRREZ ADOBE - In 1841 the municipality of Monterey granted a lot to Joaquín Gutiérrez where he and his wife, Josefa, built an adobe home. The house has been donated to the State by the Monterey Foundation.
