= Rancho Llano Seco =

Coordinates: 39.630°N 121.940°W

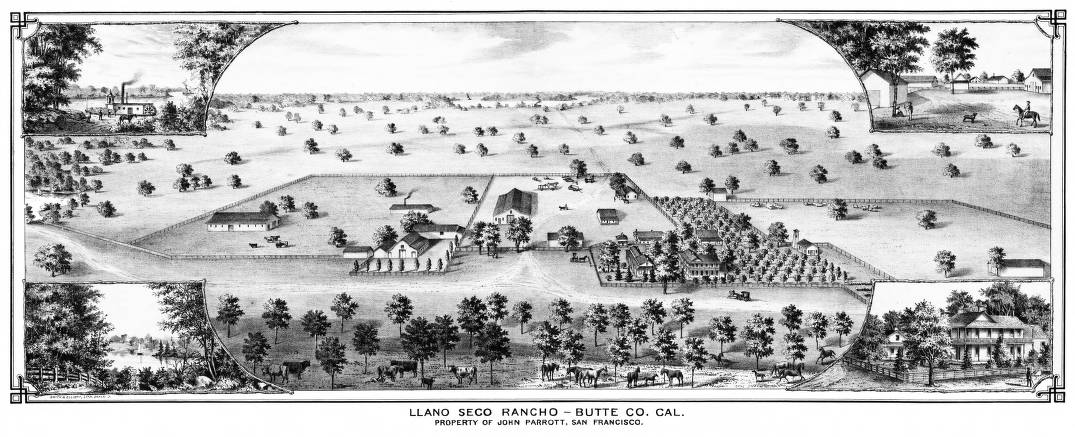
Drawing of John Parrott's ranch, Rancho Llano Seco

Rancho Llano Seco was a 17,767-acre (71.90 km^{2}) Mexican land grant in present-day Butte County, California, given in 1845 by Mexican Governor Pio Pico to Sebastian Keyser (Kayser). Llano seco means 'dry plains' in Spanish. The grant extended along the east bank of the Sacramento River south of present-day Chico. It remains an active ranch.

== History ==
The four–square league grant, provisionally made in 1844 by Governor Manuel Micheltorena, was confirmed in 1845 by Governor Pico. Keyser, born in Austria, was a trapper who had accompanied John Sutter in 1838 from Missouri, through New Mexico to California. Keyser went to Oregon but returned in 1841 to work for Sutter at his Rancho New Helvetia. In 1845, Keyser became owner of a half interest in Rancho Johnson. He settled on the Bear River and married Elizabeth Rhoads, later selling his interest in the ranch over to Charles James Brenham in 1849. Keyser then operated a ferry on the Cosumnes River, where he drowned in 1850.

With the cession of California to the United States following the Mexican-American War, the 1848 Treaty of Guadalupe Hidalgo provided that the land grants would be honored. As required by the Land Act of 1851, a claim for Rancho Llano Seco was filed with the Public Land Commission in 1852, and the grant was patented to Brenham in 1860.

Between 1860 and 1875, John Parrott acquired all of Rancho Llano Seco. John Parrott (-1884), a native of Tennessee, joined his brother's mercantile and importing business in Mexico. He was appointed United States Consul at Mazatlán from 1837 to 1846, getting reappointed to the position in 1848 following the Mexican–American War until his resignation and move to San Francisco in 1850. Parrot and Company, of San Francisco was a major landholder and banking firm. In 1852, he built one of San Francisco's first large buildings, the Parrott Block. In 1853, he married Abbie Eastman Meagher (1829–1917). In 1862, he bought part of Rancho de las Pulgas, and six years later he built his Baywood residence and estate. Rancho Llano Seco is still owned by the descendants of John and Abbie Parrott.
