= Rancho Honcut =

Land grant given to California by Mexico

Coordinates: 39.250°N 121.580°W

Rancho Honcut was a 31,080-acre (125.8 km^{2}) Mexican land grant in present-day Yuba County, California given in 1844 by Governor Manuel Micheltorena to Theodor Cordua. The rancho is named after Honcut Creek which bounded the grant on the north. The grant was bounded on the east by the Sierra Nevada Mountains, on the south by the Yuba River, on the west by the Feather River, and included present day Honcut and Ramirez.

== History ==
In 1842, John Sutter leased Rancho New Helvetia land to Theodor Cordua, a native of Mecklenburg, Germany, who raised livestock and, in 1843, built a home and trading post he called New Mecklenburg, the site of present-day Marysville. It soon became commonly known as Cordua's ranch. In 1844, Cordua obtained from the Mexican government, a seven square league land grant directly north of his leased land.

In 1848, Cordua decided he needed a partner to help him run the ranch. So he sold a half-interest in Rancho Honcut to a former employee, Charles Julian Covillaud (b. 21 Nov 1816 in Cognac, France; d. 05 Feb 1867 in Marysville). Covillaud had come overland from Missouri in 1846 and worked for Theodor Cordua. He was among the first to mine for gold on the Yuba River in 1848. In 1848 Charles Covillaud, married Mary Murphy (1831–1867), a survivor of the Donner Party. Mary had been briefly married to William Johnson (d.1863) owner of the nearby Rancho Johnson. In 1849, Cordua, sold his remaining half-interest in Rancho Honcut to Michael C. Nye and William M. Foster, brothers-in-law to Covillaud's wife, Mary Murphy. Cordua lost most of the money he made from the sale of the ranch on investments in Suttersville real estate and gold mines, and left California in 1852. Cordua Bar on the Yuba River is named for him.

Michael C. Nye (1821–1905), an American born of German parents, came overland to California with the Bartleson-Bidwell Party in 1841 and married Harriet Frances Murphy (1828 - 1870), a survivor of the Donner Party. William McFadden Foster (1815 - 1874), also a survivor of the Donner Party, married Sarah Ann Charlotte Murphy (1826 - 1906). Foster Bar on the Yuba River is named for him. In September, 1849, Nye and Foster sold their interest to Covillaud, who then had title to the whole grant. A few days later, Covillaud sold half of his property to José Manuel Ramirez and John Sampson. Ramirez came with Sampson from Chile in 1849, to mine for gold. The town of Ramirez is named for him. During the same month, Covillaud sold half the remaining half of his property to Theodore Sicard. Sicard was a French sailor, who from 1842 to 1843, worked for Sutter as the manager of Hock Farm. Sicard Flat on the Yuba River is named for him. In addition to Cordua's Rancho Honcut, the four partners Covillaud, Ramirez, Sampson, and Sicard, known as Covillaud & Co., also bought Cordua's leased land on Rancho New Helvetia from Sutter.

With the cession of California to the United States following the Mexican-American War, the 1848 Treaty of Guadalupe Hidalgo provided that the land grants would be honored. As required by the Land Act of 1851, a claim for Rancho Honcut was filed with the Public Land Commission in 1852, and the grant was patented to Covillaud & Co. in 1863. A claim by Henrique Huber for eight square leagues to E. Huber by Governor Micheltorena in 1845, was filed with the Commission in 1852, and rejected in 1853.
