= New Helvetia =

19th-century settlement centered in present-day Sacramento, California

Coordinates: 38.580°N 121.480°W

New Helvetia (Spanish: Nueva Helvetia), meaning "New Switzerland", was a 19th-century Alta California settlement and rancho, centered in present-day Sacramento, California.

== Colony of Nueva Helvetia ==
The Swiss pioneer John Sutter (1803–1880) arrived in Alta California with other Euro-American settlers in August 1839. He established an agricultural and trading colony, with the stockade Sutter's Fort, and named it "Nueva Helvetia". It was located near the confluence of the Sacramento River and American River. In English the name means "New Switzerland", after Sutter's home country. The design was influenced by Bents Fort operated by the William Bent, which Sutter visited before entering Alta California, Richard.

The site of "Nueva Helvetia" is just a few miles east of where his son, John Sutter, Jr., established Sacramento, and is on the eastern edge of present-day downtown Sacramento.

== Rancho New Helvetia ==
Rancho New Helvetia, in Spanish Rancho Nueva Helvetia, was a 48,839-acre (197.64 km^{2}) Mexican land grant issued in 1841 by Governor Juan Alvarado to John Sutter. It encompassed lands in present-day Sacramento County, Sutter County, and Yuba County, California.

The grant extended roughly from near present-day Marysville, southwards along the Feather River, to the confluence of the Sacramento River and American River near present-day Sacramento. It was significantly larger than Sutter's 1839 Nueva Helvetia colony.

By 1840, the pueblo (town) and rancho settlements in Mexican Alta California were primarily located on coastal plains and the inland valleys near them. The Californios were worried about encroachments by foreigners, especially by American immigrants. To serve as a buffer "against their invasion, and 'marauding' bands of Indians, hunters, and trappers", Governor Alvarado granted eleven square leagues of land, the maximum under Mexican law, in the lower Sacramento Valley, then in the interior of the territory. Part of Sutter's mandate with the grant was to encourage settlers, and he made numerous grants of parcels of land. However, these grants far exceeded the quantity of land ultimately awarded to him.

=== Operations ===
As many as six hundred Indians worked at New Helvetia during the wheat harvest. Other industries included "a distillery, hat factory, blanket works, and a tannery." These workers were recruited through local leaders such as Maximo, a Miwok who had sent many workers to Mission San José and Anashe. Housing and working conditions at the fort were very poor, with enslaved Indians who were uncooperative being "whipped, jailed, and executed." Housing for workers living in nearby villages and rancherías was described as somewhat better.

The settlement was defended by an army of Miwok, Nisenan, and Mission Indians, all consisting of 150 infantry, 50 cavalry, and German-speaking white officers. This group, wearing Russian uniforms purchased from Fort Ross, marched to the Pueblo of Los Angeles area and briefly defended Governor Manuel Micheltorena from the revolt of the Californios.

=== Gold Rush ===
In January 1848 James W. Marshall found gold at Sutter's Mill on the rancho, starting the California Gold Rush. Sutter was forced to abandon his business ventures at the settlement after that, when the area was overrun by large numbers of gold-seekers. Sutter's Fort is preserved as a California State Historic Park. With the gold rush, Sutter's workers abandoned him to seek their fortune in the gold fields. Later, squatters occupied his land. By 1852, Sutter was bankrupt.

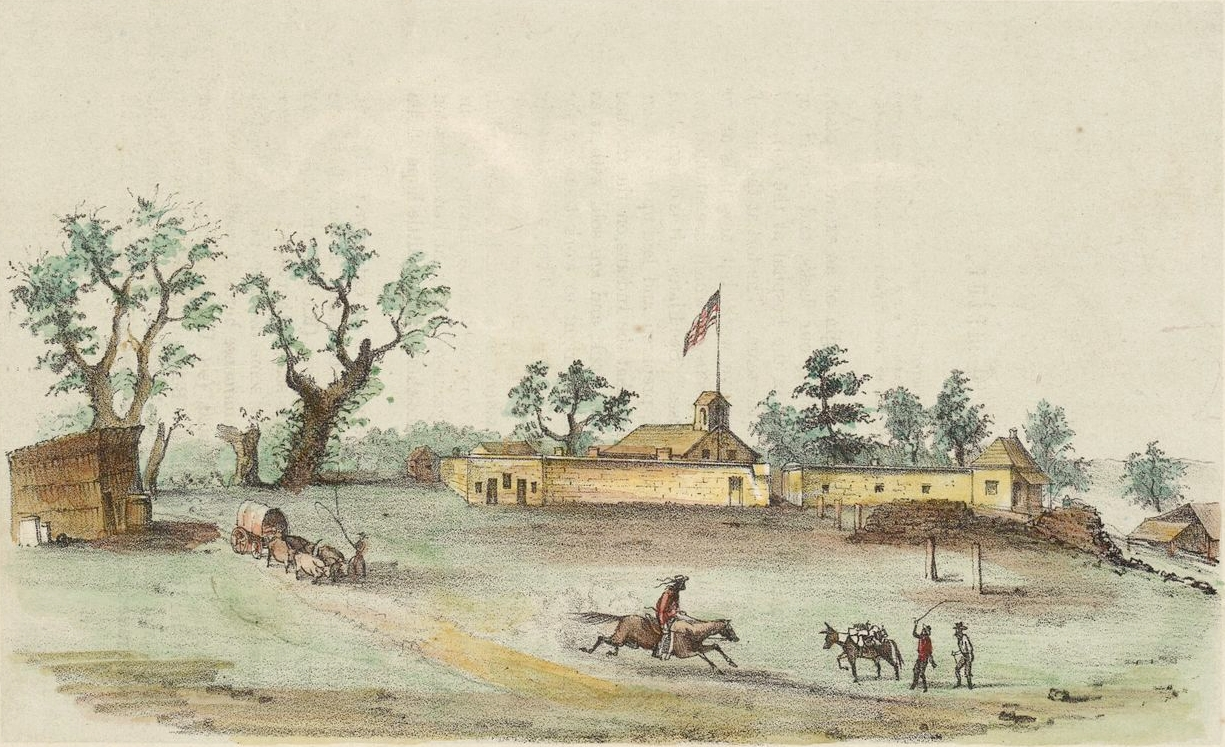
An engraving of New Helvetia made in 1849

=== Post-statehood ===
With the cession of California to the United States following the Mexican–American War, the 1848 Treaty of Guadalupe Hidalgo provided that the land grants would be honored. As required by the Land Act of 1851, in 1852 Sutter filed a claim with the Public Land Commission for the eleven square leagues granted by Alvarado in 1841. In 1853 Sutter amended his petition, and claimed an additional 22-square-league "Rancho New Helvetia Sobrante", granted to him and his son, John A. Sutter Jr., by Governor Manuel Micheltorena in 1845.

Both grants (New Helvetia and Sobrante) were confirmed by the US District Court in 1857, but the US Attorney General filed an appeal and took the case to the US Supreme Court. Although Sutter could not produce the original records of his grant, the Supreme Court accepted the 1841 Alvarado grant (Rancho New Helvetia) and sent the 1845 Micheltorena grant (Rancho New Helvetia Sobrante) back to the district court. In 1864, the US Supreme Court rejected the 1845 Micheltorena grant (Rancho New Helvetia Sobrante). The eleven square league Alvarado grant was patented to John A. Sutter in 1866.

A claim for part of Rancho New Helvetia was filed by Charles Covillaud, J. M. Ramírez, W. H. Sampson, R. B. Buchanan, and G. N. Sweazy with the Land Commission in 1852. Known as Covillaud & Co., the partners bought Cordua's Rancho Honcut, and also bought Cordua's leased land on Rancho New Helvetia from Sutter. A claim for Rancho New Helvetia was filed by Roland Gelston with the Land Commission in 1852. Roland Gelston, a San Francisco merchant owned considerable property there and in Sacramento. A claim for part of Rancho New Helvetia as filed by Hiram Grimes, who owned Rancho Del Paso, with the Land Commission in 1853.

For fifteen years following the 1864 US Supreme Court rejection of the Sobrante grant, Sutter tried to obtain reimbursement from Congress for his help in colonizing California. However, little was done.

John Sutter died in 1880, in a hotel in Washington, D.C.

== See also ==
- Sutter's Fort
- History of Sacramento, California
- List of Ranchos of California
- Ranchos of Sacramento County, California
- New Helvetia Cemetery
