= Leslie M. Palm =

United States Marine Corps general, CEO/Publisher Marine Corps Association

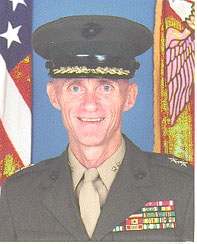
- Born: October 14, 1944; Marysville, California
- Died: January 12, 2025 (age 80); Charlotte, North Carolina
- Military career
- Allegiance: United States
- Branch: United States Marine Corps
- Service years: 1966-1998
- Rank: Major General
- Commands: 10th Marine Regiment; MCAGCC Twentynine Palms
- Conflicts: Vietnam War; Operations Desert Shield, Desert Storm
- Other work: Publisher/CEO, Marine Corps Association

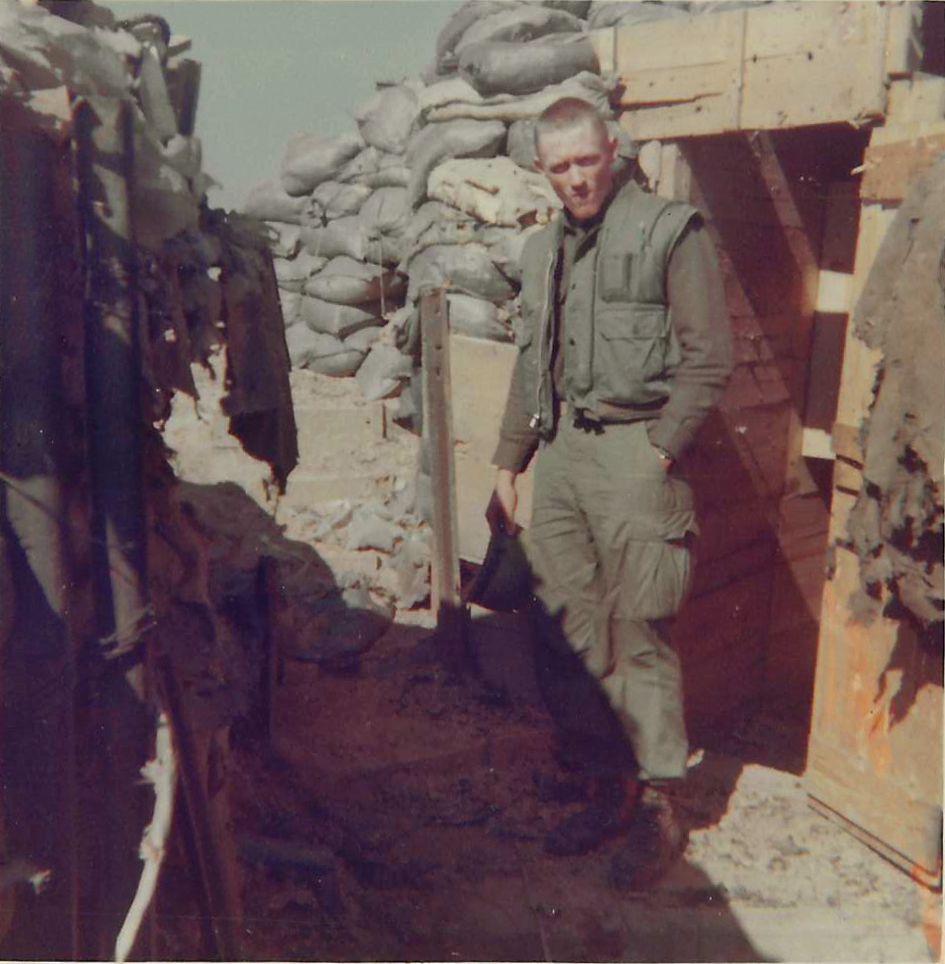
General Palm while on deployment in Vietnam.

Leslie Mather Palm (October 14, 1944 – January 12, 2025) was a retired United States Marine Corps major general and former publisher and CEO of the Marine Corps Association. His last active duty position was the Director, Marine Corps Staff, Headquarters Marine Corps, Washington, D.C. (1996–1998). Palm retired on September 1, 1998. On January 12, 2025, Palm died at age 80 from complications of Primary Sclerosing Cholangitis.

== Biography ==
Leslie Palm was born on October 14, 1944, in Marysville, California. He earned his Bachelor of Science degree in anthropology in 1966 from the University of Oregon, where he was a member of Sigma Chi. He later earned a master's degree in Military Arts and Sciences from the Army Command and General Staff College in 1980 and a Master of Arts in National Security and Strategic Studies from the Naval War College in 1986.

Palm entered the Marine Corps through the Platoon Leaders Course Program and was commissioned a second lieutenant on November 1, 1966. Upon completion of The Basic School at Marine Corps Base Quantico, Virginia, in August 1967, he attended Field Artillery Officers Basic Course at Fort Sill, Oklahoma, graduating in November 1967.

From December 1967 to December 1968, Palm served in Vietnam as a Forward Observer and Fire Direction Officer in the 1st Battalion, 13th Marines at Khe Sanh. He also commanded a 155 mm gun platoon and 8" platoon of the 5th 155 mm Gun Battery. Upon returning to the United States he was assigned to Fort Sill as a gunnery instructor in both the basic and career branches. While in this assignment, he was promoted to captain on December 1, 1970.

In January 1972, he was assigned to the 3rd Marine Division on Okinawa where he commanded D Battery, 2nd Battalion, 12th Marines and served as the Battalion S-3 Officer. Returning from overseas, he attended the Amphibious Warfare School, Quantico, then was reassigned to The Basic School, where he commanded the Artillery Demonstration Unit. During May 1974, he transferred to Headquarters Marine Corps, where he was assigned to the Officer Assignment Section until June 1976, when he was selected as the aide-de-camp to the Assistant Commandant of the Marine Corps. He was promoted to major on July 1, 1977.

From July 1977 to June 1979, he served in the 2nd Marine Division, Camp Lejeune, North Carolina, as the S-3 Officer for the 1st Battalion, 10th Marines. He then attended the Army Command & General Staff College, graduating in June 1980. General Palm was ordered to Amphibious Group Two in Little Creek, Virginia, where he served as Assistant Plans Officer and the Supporting Arms Coordinator. He was promoted to lieutenant colonel on July 1, 1982.

From July 1982 until October 1983, he served as the Director of Manpower for the Marine Corps Air Ground Combat Center Twentynine Palms, California, then was reassigned to the 7th Marine Amphibious Brigade to command the 4th Battalion (redesignation 5th Battalion), 11th Marines until July 1985. He graduated from the Naval War College, Newport, R.I., in June 1986.

He was again ordered to Headquarters Marine Corps and served as the Head of Manpower Planning and Programming and Budgeting Section. On July 1, 1988, he was assigned as the Military Assistant to the Assistant Commandant. he was promoted to colonel on October 1, 1988. When the Office of the Assistant Commandant and the Office of the Chief of Staff were combined in February 1989, he assumed the responsibilities of Secretary of the General Staff.

On August 16, 1990, he assumed command of the 10th Marine Regiment and participated in Operations Desert Shield and Desert Storm. While serving in this capacity, he was selected in December 1991 for promotion to brigadier general. He was advanced to that grade on May 1, 1992, and assumed his duties as Assistant Deputy Chief of Staff for Manpower and Reserve Affairs, (Manpower Plans & Policy), Headquarters Marine Corps, Washington, D.C.

Brigadier General Palm assumed command of Marine Corps Air Ground Combat Center Twentynine Palms, California on August 16, 1994. In February 1995, while serving as the Commanding General, MCAGCC Twentynine Palms, he was promoted to the grade of Major General. In 1996, he became the Director, Marine Corps Staff, Headquarters Marine Corps, Washington, D.C., serving in that post until 1998. Palm retired on September 1, 1998.

After retirement, Palm became the publisher and CEO of the Marine Corps Association, which publishes the Leatherneck Magazine and the Marine Corps Gazette.

Much of Palm's retirement was spent in Charlotte, North Carolina, where on January 12, 2025, he died at age 80 from complications of Primary Sclerosing Cholangitis.

== Awards ==

	Legion of Merit w/ valor device	Meritorious Service Medal	
Navy and Marine Corps Commendation Medal w/ 2 award stars & valor device	Combat Action Ribbon	Navy Presidential Unit Citation	Navy Unit Commendation
Navy Meritorious Unit Commendation	National Defense Service Medal w/ 1 service star	Vietnam Service Medal w/ 3 service stars	Southwest Asia Service Medal w/ 2 service stars
Navy Sea Service Deployment Ribbon	Vietnam Gallantry Cross unit citation	Vietnam Campaign Medal	Kuwait Liberation Medal (Saudi Arabia)

== See also ==
- Leatherneck Magazine
- Marine Corps Gazette
