= Marysville Historic Commercial District =

Historic district in California, United States

- U.S. National Register of Historic Places
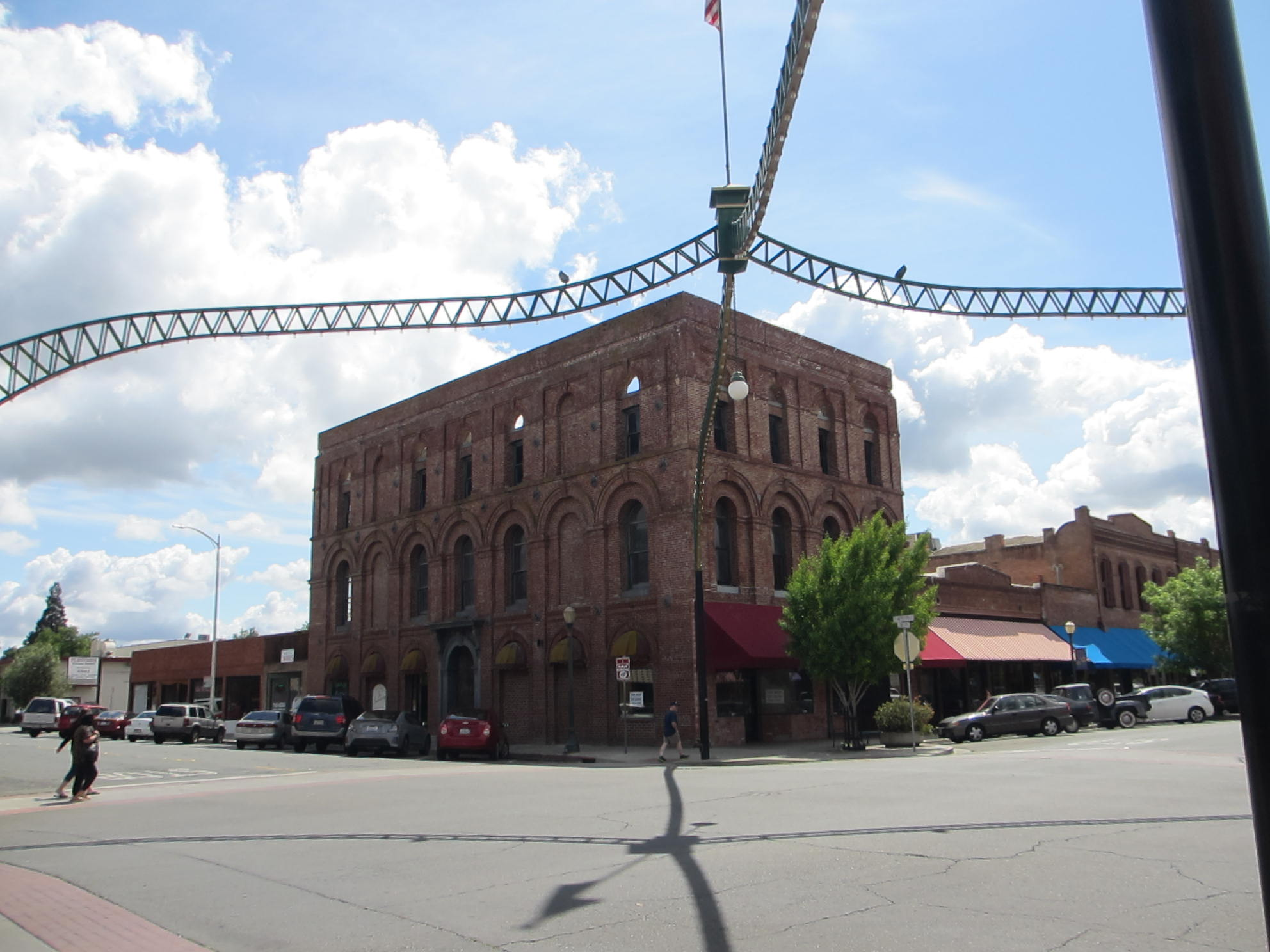

- Location within California
- Location: Roughly bounded by First, Sixth, C, and E Sts., Marysville, California
- Coordinates: 39°08′18″N 121°35′19″W
- Area: 23 acres (9.3 ha)
- Architect: I.C. Evans
- Architectural style: Mission/Spanish Revival, Italianate
- NRHP reference No.: 99000692
- Added to NRHP: June 10, 1999

The Marysville Historic Commercial District, in Marysville, California, is a 23-acre (9.3 ha) historic district which was listed on the National Register of Historic Places in 1999.

The district included 59 contributing buildings and 27 non-contributing ones, on parts of 14 blocks. It is roughly bounded by First, Sixth, C, and E Streets.

It includes Mission/Spanish Revival and Italianate architecture.
