= José Manuel Ramírez Rosales =

Chilean painter (1804–1877)

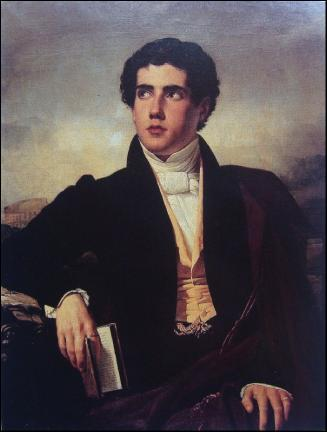
- Portrait of Ramírez Rosales by Raymond Monvoisin
- Occupations: Painter, businessman, farmer
- Relatives: Juan Enrique Rosales (grandfather); Vicente Pérez Rosales (cousin)

José Manuel Ramírez Rosales (1804 in Santiago – 1877 in Valparaíso) was a Chilean painter who was educated in France. He specialized in landscapes and maritime scenes, often with mythological elements. Although mostly involved in various business enterprises, he is remembered as Chile's first significant artist.

== Biography ==
He was born to an aristocratic family that was related to the patriot, Juan Enrique Rosales. His first cousin was Vicente Pérez Rosales. In 1825, he was part of a group of young people from the upper ranks of Chilean society who sailed to Europe with Don Mariano Egaña; a trip that was later described by Pérez Rosales in his book, Recuerdos del pasado (Times Gone By).

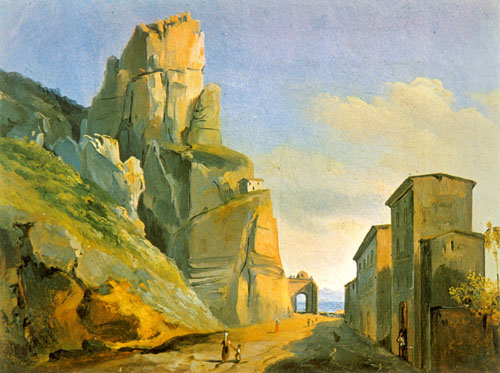
A Street in Talara.

After a stay in London, they arrived in Paris and enrolled in a school for Spanish-Americans run by Manuel Silvela. Ramírez initially studied music and art, and finally settled on studying the latter. He worked with Jean-Charles-Joseph Remond, who introduced him to landscape painting derived directly from contact with nature. Eventually, he became a friend and associate of Raymond Monvoisin.

He returned to Chile in 1836 and settled in Valparaíso. Never becoming a full-time painter, he also dabbled in business enterprises with his brother, Juan Enrique, and engaged in various other adventures. In this capacity, he got together with a young Englishman from Yorkshire named John Sampson and sailed to California in 1849, to join the Gold Rush.

== In California ==
After suffering harassment from organized criminal gangs and being subjected to a special tax imposed on foreign miners, he and Sampson changed their plans, joined with two French immigrants, Theodore Sicard and Charles Covillaud, and acquired most of the Rancho Cordua in Yuba County, at the confluence of the Yuba and Feather Rivers. Sampson died shortly after, at the age of only thirty-one. This was a strategic point for steamboats travelling from San Francisco to the goldfields and soon after became part of the city of Marysville.

After that, Ramírez was primarily engaged in agricultural pursuits and imported some of California's first wine grape vines from Chile. In 1853, the writer Benjamín Vicuña Mackenna reported that Ramírez' farm produced some of the best watermelons in the state. With wood from Chile, he built a manorial residence which is still standing in the center of Marysville and is known as the "Ramírez Castle/Ellis House". A small unincorporated town just outside Marysville is named after him.

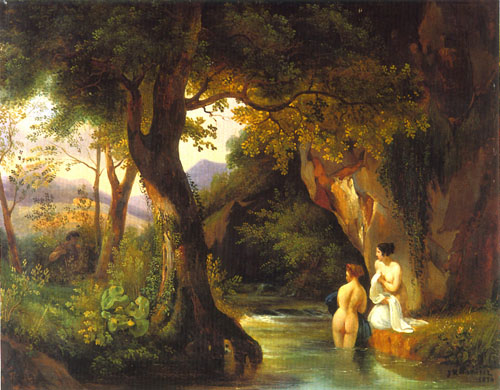
Nymphs with a Faun.

Despite these successes, he suffered from the racist attitudes prevalent at the time. In 1854, under the pretext of searching for stagecoach robbers, a vigilante group entered his home, confiscated his weapons, and shot him, leaving him seriously injured. As soon as he recovered, he returned to Valparaíso, where he started the city's first horse-drawn trolley line.
