= Marysville, California =

City in California, United States

- City
- City of Marysville
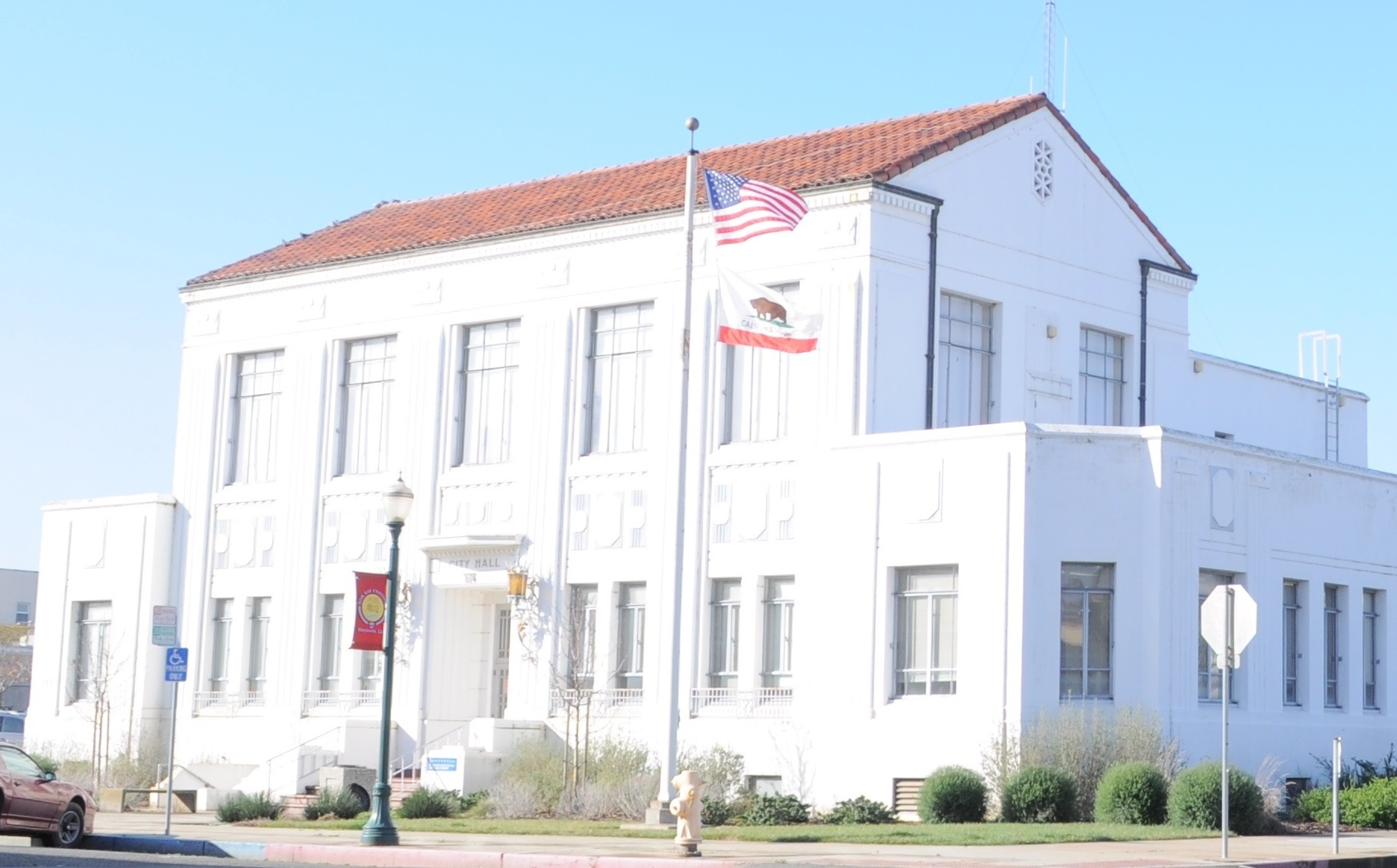
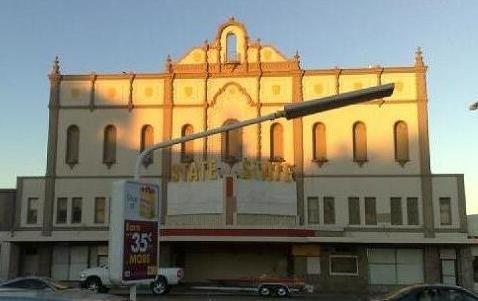
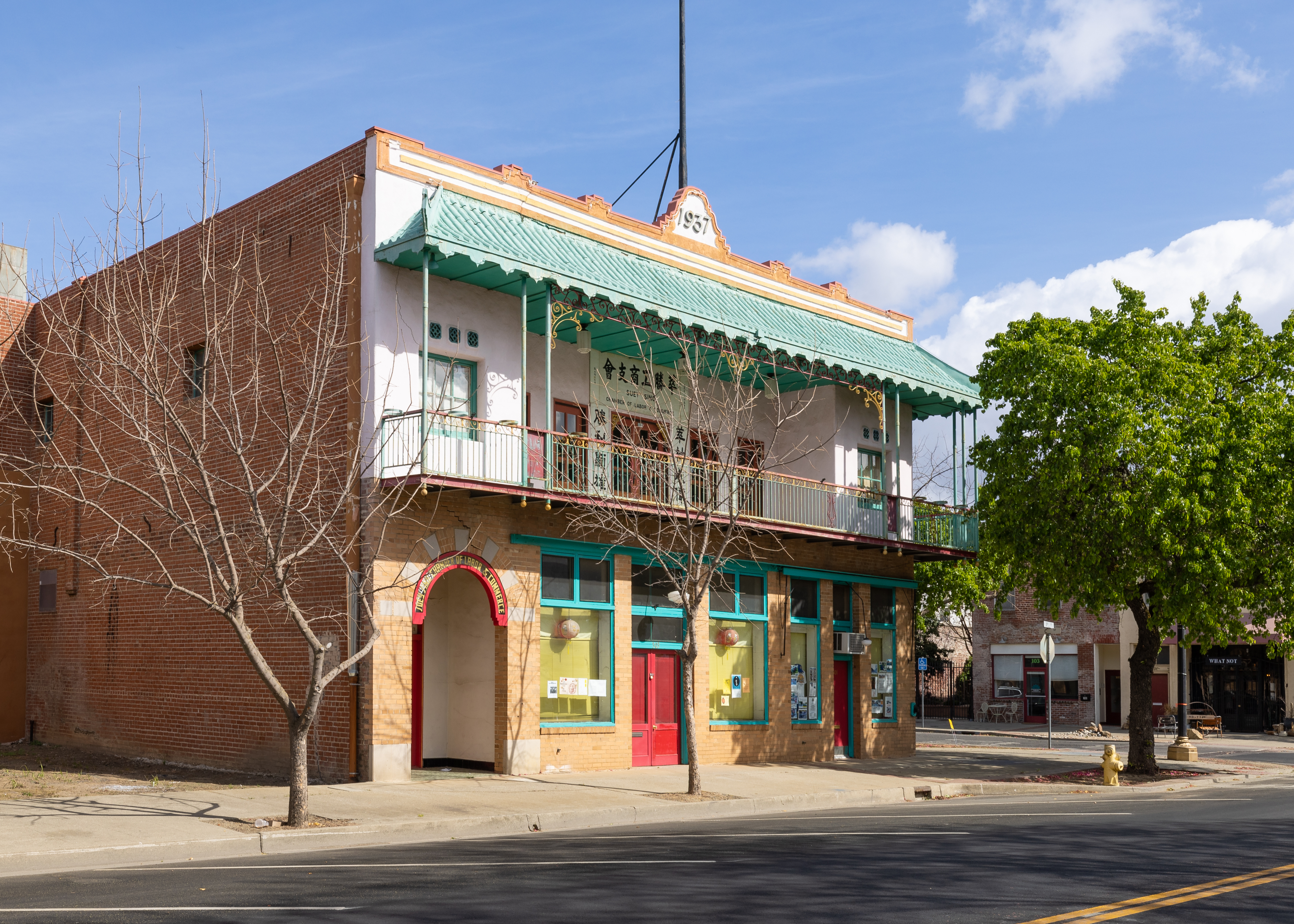
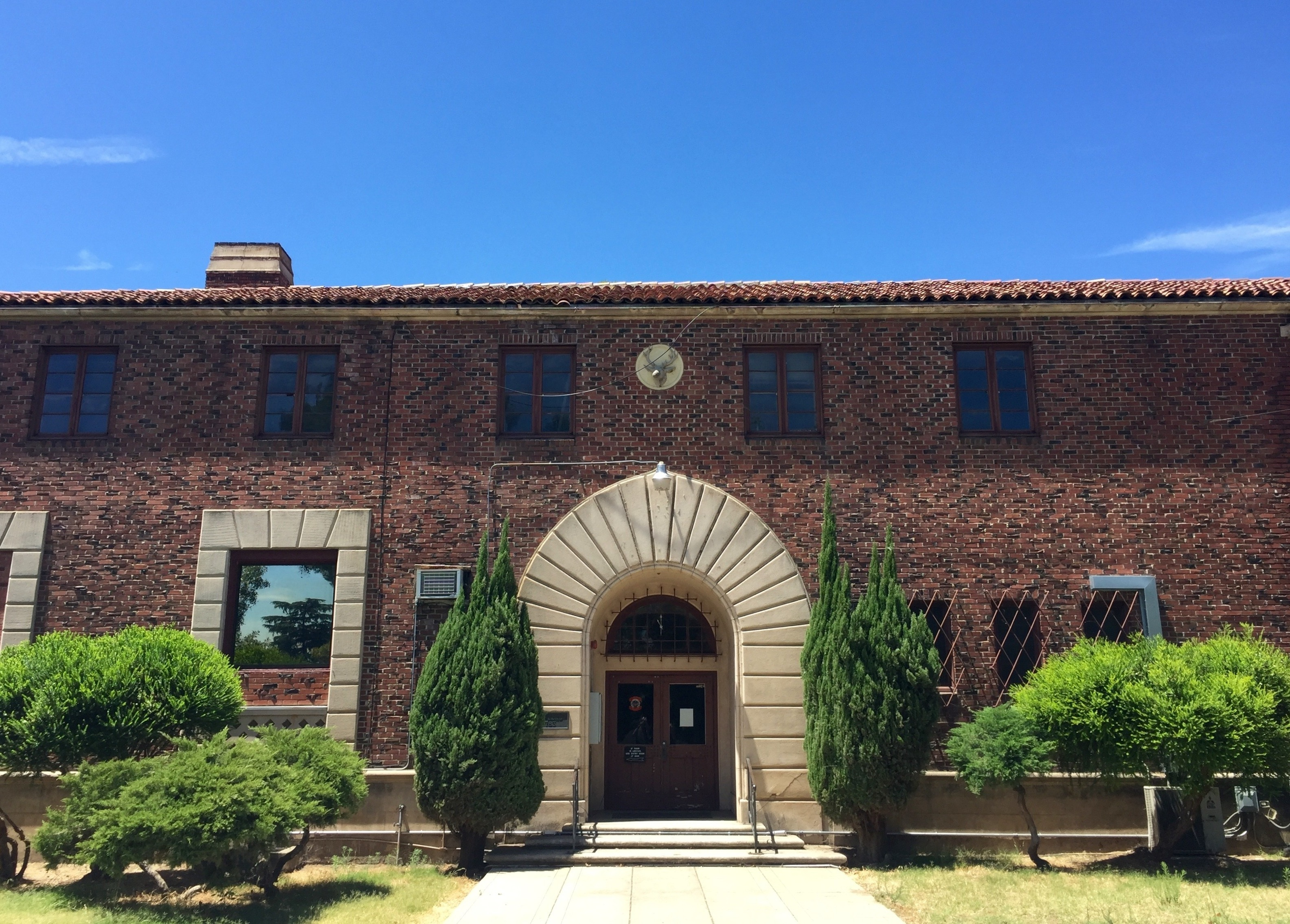
- Top: City Hall (left) and State Theatre (right); bottom: Chinatown (left) and Elks Lodge (right).
- Nickname: Gateway to the Gold Fields
- Interactive map of Marysville, California
- Location in the United States
- Coordinates: 39°9′N 121°35′W
- Country: United States
- State: California
- County: Yuba
- Incorporated: February 5, 1851

Government
  - Mayor: Chris Branscum
  - Vice mayor: Bruce Buttacavolli
  - City manager: Jim Schaad

Area
  - Total: 3.58 sq mi (9.28 km^{2})
  - Land: 3.46 sq mi (8.97 km^{2})
  - Water: 0.12 sq mi (0.31 km^{2}) 3.36%
- Elevation: 62 ft (19 m)

Population (2020)
  - Total: 12,844
  - Density: 3,710/sq mi (1,430/km^{2})
- Time zone: UTC-8 (Pacific)
  - Summer (DST): UTC-7 (PDT)
- ZIP code: 95901
- Area code: 530, 837
- FIPS code: 06-46170
- GNIS feature IDs: 277554, 2411046
- Website: www.marysville.ca.us

Marysville is a city in and the county seat of Yuba County, California, United States, located in the Gold Country region of Northern California. As of the 2020 United States census, the population was 12,844, up from 12,072 in the 2010 census. It is part of the Yuba-Sutter area of Greater Sacramento.

== History ==
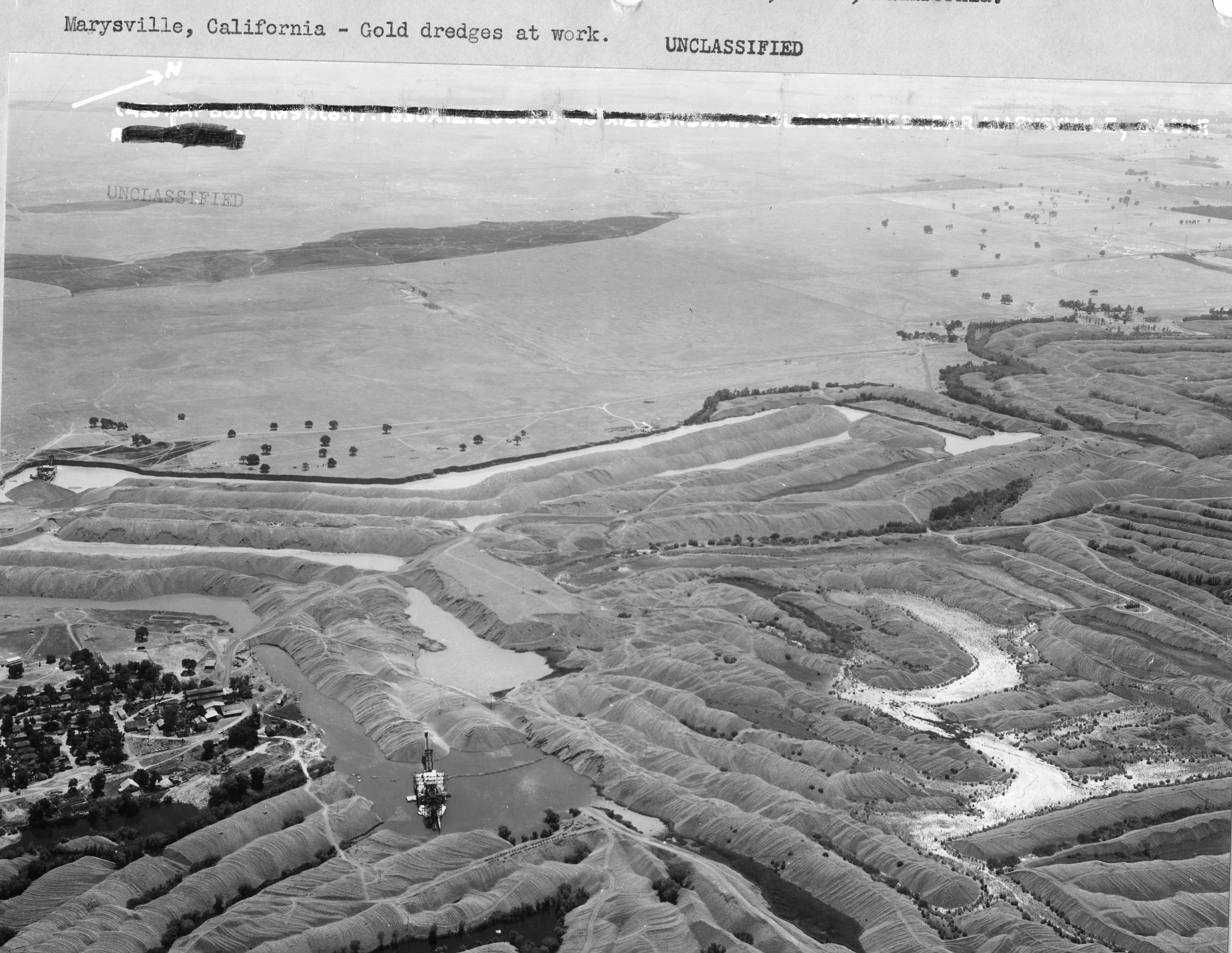
Gold dredging at Marysville

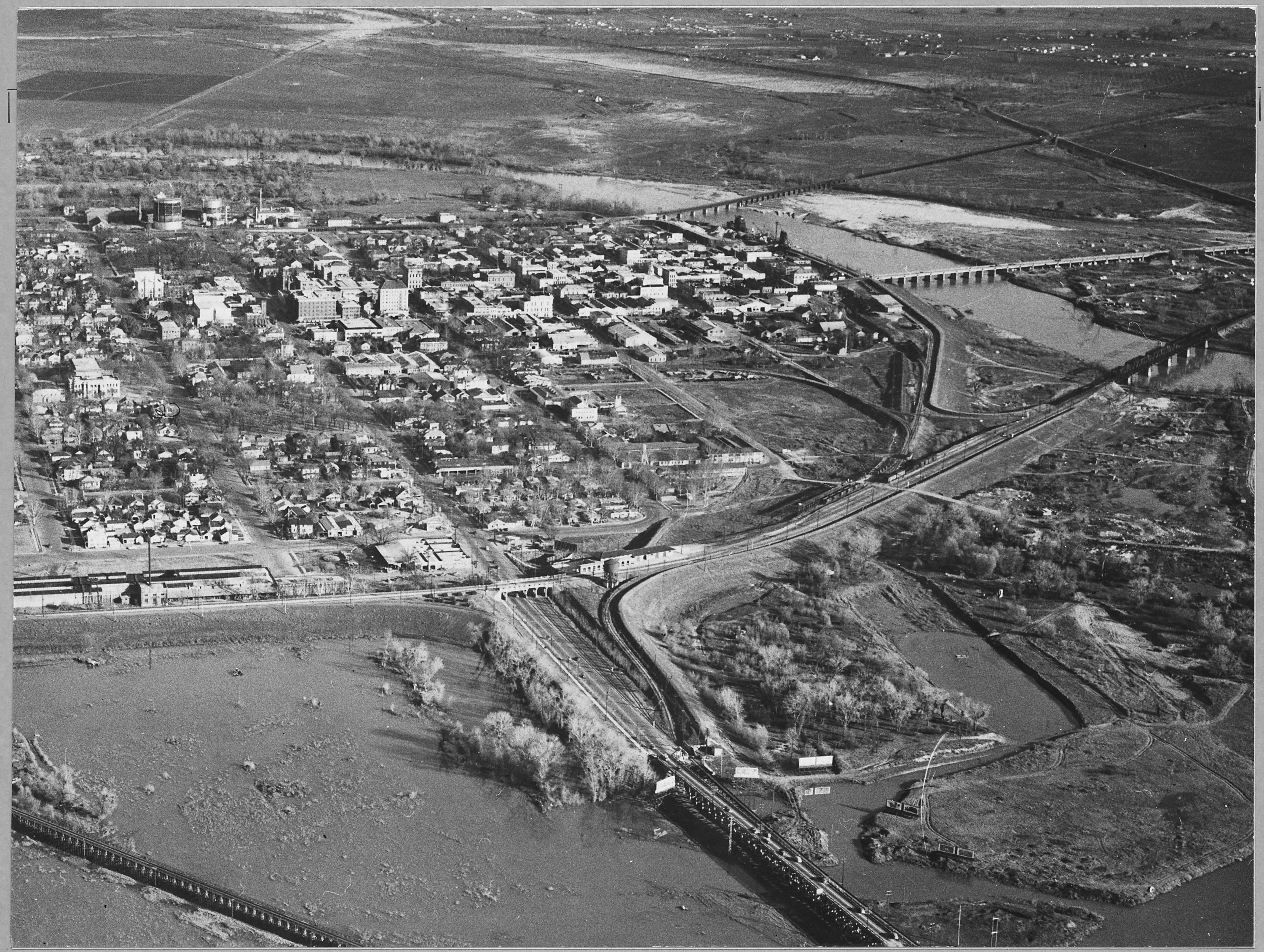
View of the city of Marysville, 1940

Marysville is located on the ancestral land of the Maidu, who occupied the area for 10,000 years prior to the arrival of Jedediah Smith and trappers from the Hudson Bay Company in 1828, who were the first non-natives to explore the area. Spanish and Mexican explorers never reached that far north on the Feather River. In 1843, John Sutter leased part of his Rancho New Helvetia land to Theodore Cordua, a native of Mecklenburg in Germany, who raised livestock, and in 1843 built a home and trading post he called New Mecklenburg. The trading post and home was situated at what would later become the southern end of 'D' Street, Marysville's main street. In 1844, the Mexican government granted Cordua his own land grant, Rancho Honcut.

In 1848, Charles Covillaud, a former employee of Cordua, discovered riches in the gold fields and bought half of the Cordua ranch. In January 1849, Michael C. Nye and William Foster, brothers-in-law of Covillaud's wife, Mary Murphy, a survivor of the Donner Party, bought the other half of the Cordua ranch. They later sold their interest to Covillaud. In October of the same year, Covillaud sold most of the ranch to Jose Ramirez, John Sampson, and Theodore Sicard. During the Gold Rush, the ranch became a stopping point for the riverboats from Sacramento and San Francisco that brought prospectors to the digging grounds. Even today a sign on the roadside as one enters Marysville describes it as the "Gateway to The Gold Fields."

In 1850, Covillaud, Ramirez, Sampson, and Sicard hired Augustus Le Plongeon, a French surveyor, to create a plan for a town called Jubaville, later called Yubaville. Stephen J. Field, a newly relocated attorney, purchased 65 lots of land and drew up proper deeds for land being sold. Then, after just three days in the mining camp, he accepted the nomination to run for alcalde, a Mexican official, which combined the duties of a mayor and justice of the peace, in a new government that was being formed. On January 18, 1850, Field defeated his rival, who had been in town just six days, and a town council was elected. That night, the townsfolk decided to name the new town Marysville after Charles Covillaud's wife, Mary Murphy Covillaud, the former wife of William Johnson of Johnson's Ranch, and one of the surviving members of the Donner Party. After Marysville was incorporated by the new California Legislature, the first mayor was elected in 1851. Field went on to become one of the longest sitting members of the United States Supreme Court.

A post office was established at Marysville in 1851. By 1853, the tent city had been replaced by brick buildings. In addition to the brick merchant buildings, Marysville had developed mills, iron works, factories, machine shops, schools, churches and two daily newspapers. The population was almost 10,000. By 1857, Marysville had become one of the largest cities in California, due to its strategic location. Over $10 million in gold was shipped from the banks in Marysville to the U.S. Mint in San Francisco. The city's founders imagined Marysville becoming "The New York of the Pacific."

Debris loosed by hydraulic mining above Marysville raised the riverbeds of both the Feather and the Yuba Rivers and rendered the city vulnerable to flooding during winter storms and spring run-offs. The city built a levee system that is still maintained today. The levee system sealed the city off and has made additional city growth virtually impossible; as such the population has not increased much since their construction and Marysville is known as "California's Oldest 'Little' City." The hydraulic mining debris choked the Feather River and soon the riverboats could not make the trip to Marysville.

Marysville was home to a significant Chinese American community beginning in the 1850s. While many Chinese were driven forcibly from their homes throughout California between 1870 and 1900, Marysville became a place of refuge for them and was one of the few Chinatowns in the state that did not experience violence. The Chinese Bok Kai Temple claims to be the oldest continually operating Taoist temple in America, and a Chinese New Year festival has been celebrated in Marysville since 1880. The historical importance of Marysville to the Chinese-American community has been imprinted in its language. In Cantonese, Marysville is known as Sahm Fou (三埠, Third City); Sacramento Yee Fou (二埠, Second City); and San Francisco Dai Fou (大埠, The Big City).

There was also an active Jewish merchant community in Marysville from the Gold Rush era through the early years of the twentieth century. Nathan Schneider established Schneider's Clothing in 1862, it was advertised as "the Home of Values", and it existed until the late 1980s. Isaac and Simon Glazier ran the Old Corner Cigar Store from 1851 to 1862, when they moved to San Francisco. J.H. Marcuse founded the Western and Palace Cigar Store. Philip Brown advertised himself as "Marysville's leading tailor, pants made to order from $4.00 up and P. Brown's specialty, White Labor Overall." Union Lumber, established in 1852 by W.K. Hudson and Samuel Harryman, was later purchased by bookkeeper H.J. Cheim, and is still owned by the Cheim family.

In 2010, the Marysville City Council made a decision to sell a portion of Washington Square Park for development of a commercial shopping center, part of an effort to increase tax revenue. This came after the city won a costly legal battle brought on by the Citizens to Preserve Marysville's Parks, a group of citizens opposed to development in the city's green spaces. A mitigation measure to offset the loss of city green space is technically within city limits, but falls outside the city's levee ring.

== Geography ==
According to the United States Census Bureau, the city has a total area of 3.6 square miles (9.3 km^{2}), of which 3.5 square miles (9.1 km^{2}) is land and 0.1 square miles (0.26 km^{2}) (3.36%) is water.

Flooding has been a major concern for the city for many years.

Marysville is 40 miles north of Sacramento and located in the Sacramento Valley. The city is bordered on the south and east by the Yuba River and the west by the Feather River, with the two rivers converging just southwest of the city. In years of significant snow runoff from the nearby Sierra Nevada range or heavy rain from winter storms, these two rivers pose a serious flooding risk to the city.

=== Climate ===
Marysville has a hot-summer Mediterranean climate (Köppen Csa), which has mild, wet winters and hot, dry summers. January is usually the wettest month; July the driest and hottest. The wet season starts from mid-October and ends in mid-April when the region sees frequent rain and is usually under the tule fog. Heavy rain or too much mountain snow from winter storms can cause major flooding in the spring. Snow is rare in the valley, but cold waves from the north bring some light snow and ice. Spring is wet in the beginning but becomes drier and warmer as summer months approach. April is the wettest spring month. May has some rain, but usually from thunderstorms rather than winter storms. Spring orchards and fields become filled with flowers and tree blossoms during this time. June-to-September is the dry and hot season. Rain usually doesn't fall at all, except from very rare southwest monsoon thunderstorms. July and August are the hottest months when temperatures reach the upper 90s. The delta breeze, which comes from the Bay Area on summer nights, helps cool temperatures and add humidity. At times this delta breeze is strong enough to bring coastal fog inland to the Sacramento Valley. Autumn starts out warm but begins to become cooler, wetter, and foggier. From September to mid October temperatures begin to cool down rapidly bringing rain and fog. Rain and fog become more frequent from mid-October into November.

Climate data for Marysville, California (Yuba County Airport), 1991–2020 normals, extremes 2000–present
Month	Jan	Feb	Mar	Apr	May	Jun	Jul	Aug	Sep	Oct	Nov	Dec	Year
Record high °F (°C)	76 (24)	80 (27)	88 (31)	96 (36)	107 (42)	111 (44)	113 (45)	110 (43)	115 (46)	104 (40)	86 (30)	73 (23)	115 (46)
Mean maximum °F (°C)	67.7 (19.8)	72.5 (22.5)	78.7 (25.9)	89.1 (31.7)	96.9 (36.1)	106.5 (41.4)	106.9 (41.6)	105.1 (40.6)	102.8 (39.3)	90.8 (32.7)	78.3 (25.7)	66.1 (18.9)	108.4 (42.4)
Mean daily maximum °F (°C)	55.5 (13.1)	60.4 (15.8)	66.2 (19.0)	72.6 (22.6)	81.9 (27.7)	90.1 (32.3)	96.2 (35.7)	94.6 (34.8)	89.6 (32.0)	79.0 (26.1)	64.2 (17.9)	55.4 (13.0)	75.5 (24.2)
Daily mean °F (°C)	46.8 (8.2)	50.8 (10.4)	54.8 (12.7)	59.5 (15.3)	67.1 (19.5)	74.0 (23.3)	78.5 (25.8)	77.0 (25.0)	72.7 (22.6)	64.2 (17.9)	52.7 (11.5)	46.6 (8.1)	62.1 (16.7)
Mean daily minimum °F (°C)	38.2 (3.4)	41.1 (5.1)	43.4 (6.3)	46.4 (8.0)	52.4 (11.3)	57.9 (14.4)	60.7 (15.9)	59.5 (15.3)	55.7 (13.2)	49.4 (9.7)	41.3 (5.2)	37.7 (3.2)	48.6 (9.3)
Mean minimum °F (°C)	27.3 (−2.6)	30.3 (−0.9)	34.2 (1.2)	37.1 (2.8)	44.3 (6.8)	50.1 (10.1)	53.9 (12.2)	53.0 (11.7)	47.9 (8.8)	39.3 (4.1)	31.4 (−0.3)	25.8 (−3.4)	24.1 (−4.4)
Record low °F (°C)	19 (−7)	24 (−4)	29 (−2)	32 (0)	35 (2)	43 (6)	51 (11)	47 (8)	41 (5)	32 (0)	26 (−3)	20 (−7)	19 (−7)
Average precipitation inches (mm)	3.81 (97)	3.65 (93)	2.92 (74)	1.40 (36)	0.93 (24)	0.28 (7.1)	0.00 (0.00)	0.05 (1.3)	0.11 (2.8)	1.03 (26)	2.21 (56)	3.68 (93)	20.07 (510.2)
Average precipitation days (≥ 0.01 in)	10.4	9.0	9.1	6.6	3.9	1.1	0.1	0.3	0.7	3.9	7.1	11.1	63.3
Source 1: NOAA
Source 2: National Weather Service (mean maxima/minima 2006–2020)

== Demographics ==
Historical population
Census	Pop.	Note	%±
1870	4,738		—
1880	4,321		−8.8%
1890	3,991		−7.6%
1900	3,497		−12.4%
1910	5,430		55.3%
1920	5,461		0.6%
1930	5,763		5.5%
1940	6,646		15.3%
1950	7,826		17.8%
1960	9,553		22.1%
1970	9,353		−2.1%
1980	9,898		5.8%
1990	12,324		24.5%
2000	12,268		−0.5%
2010	12,072		−1.6%
2020	12,844		6.4%
U.S. Decennial Census; 1860–1870 1880-1890; 1900 1910 1920; 1930 1940 1950; 1960 1970 1980; 1990 2000 2010; 2020

=== 2020 census ===
As of the 2020 census, Marysville had a population of 12,844. The median age was 33.8 years. 24.2% of residents were under the age of 18 and 14.1% of residents were 65 years of age or older. For every 100 females there were 99.7 males, and for every 100 females age 18 and over there were 98.8 males age 18 and over.

100.0% of residents lived in urban areas, while 0.0% lived in rural areas.

There were 4,800 households in Marysville, of which 34.8% had children under the age of 18 living in them. Of all households, 33.4% were married-couple households, 23.8% were households with a male householder and no spouse or partner present, and 32.6% were households with a female householder and no spouse or partner present. About 31.8% of all households were made up of individuals and 12.8% had someone living alone who was 65 years of age or older.

There were 5,098 housing units, of which 5.8% were vacant. The homeowner vacancy rate was 1.3% and the rental vacancy rate was 5.0%.

Racial composition as of the 2020 census
Race	Number	Percent
White	7,547	58.8%
Black or African American	628	4.9%
American Indian and Alaska Native	330	2.6%
Asian	539	4.2%
Native Hawaiian and Other Pacific Islander	58	0.5%
Some other race	1,977	15.4%
Two or more races	1,765	13.7%
Hispanic or Latino (of any race)	3,771	29.4%

=== 2010 census ===
The 2010 United States census reported that Marysville had a population of 12,072. The population density was 3,367.9 inhabitants per square mile (1,300.4/km^{2}). The racial makeup of Marysville was

- 8,576 (71.0%) White,
- 522 (4.3%) African American,
- 298 (2.5%) Native American,
- 498 (4.1%) Asian,
- 38 (0.3%) Pacific Islander,
- 1,247 (10.3%) from other races, and
- 893 (7.4%) from two or more races.
- Hispanic or Latino of any race were 2,920 persons (24.2%).

The Census reported that 11,402 people (94.4% of the population) lived in households, 145 (1.2%) lived in non-institutionalized group quarters, and 525 (4.3%) were institutionalized.

There were 4,668 households, out of which 1,571 (33.7%) had children under the age of 18 living in them, 1,551 (33.2%) were opposite-sex married couples living together, 836 (17.9%) had a female householder with no husband present, 318 (6.8%) had a male householder with no wife present. There were 453 (9.7%) unmarried opposite-sex partnerships, and 35 (0.7%) same-sex married couples or partnerships. 1,606 households (34.4%) were made up of individuals, and 579 (12.4%) had someone living alone who was 65 years of age or older. The average household size was 2.44. There were 2,705 families (57.9% of all households); the average family size was 3.14.

The population was spread out, with 3,032 people (25.1%) under the age of 18, 1,569 people (13.0%) aged 18 to 24, 3,158 people (26.2%) aged 25 to 44, 2,860 people (23.7%) aged 45 to 64, and 1,453 people (12.0%) who were 65 years of age or older. The median age was 32.5 years. For every 100 females, there were 99.6 males. For every 100 females age 18 and over, there were 98.3 males.

There were 5,196 housing units at an average density of 1,449.6 per square mile (559.7/km^{2}), of which 1,828 (39.2%) were owner-occupied, and 2,840 (60.8%) were occupied by renters. The homeowner vacancy rate was 2.7%; the rental vacancy rate was 10.2%. 4,571 people (37.9% of the population) lived in owner-occupied housing units and 6,831 people (56.6%) lived in rental housing units.

=== 2000 census ===
As of the 2000 census, there were 12,268 people, 4,687 households, and 2,826 families residing in the city. The population density was 3,501.1 inhabitants per square mile (1,351.8/km^{2}). There were 4,999 housing units at an average density of 1,426.6 per square mile (550.8/km^{2}). The racial makeup of the city was 71.0% White, 4.8% African American, 2.3% Native American, 6.0% Asian (including many Hmong people), 0.2% Pacific Islander, 10.1% from other races, and 5.7% from two or more races. Hispanic or Latino of any race were 17.5% of the population.

There were 4,687 households, out of which 32.4% had children under the age of 18 living with them, 38.8% were married couples living together, 15.7% had a female householder with no husband present, and 39.7% were non-families. 31.5% of all households were made up of individuals, and 11.3% had someone living alone who was 65 years of age or older. The average household size was 2.49 and the average family size was 3.14.

The population was spread out, with 27.5% under the age of 18, 11.7% from 18 to 24, 29.2% from 25 to 44, 18.4% from 45 to 64, and 13.1% who were 65 years of age or older. The median age was 32 years. For every 100 females, there were 99.6 males. For every 100 females age 18 and over, there were 96.3 males.

The median income for a household in the city was $28,494, and the median income for a family was $33,474. Males had a median income of $27,630 versus $20,240 for females. The per capita income for the city was $15,315. About 15.2% of families and 18.9% of the population were below the poverty line, including 26.9% of those under age 18 and 7.4% of those age 65 or over.

== Government ==
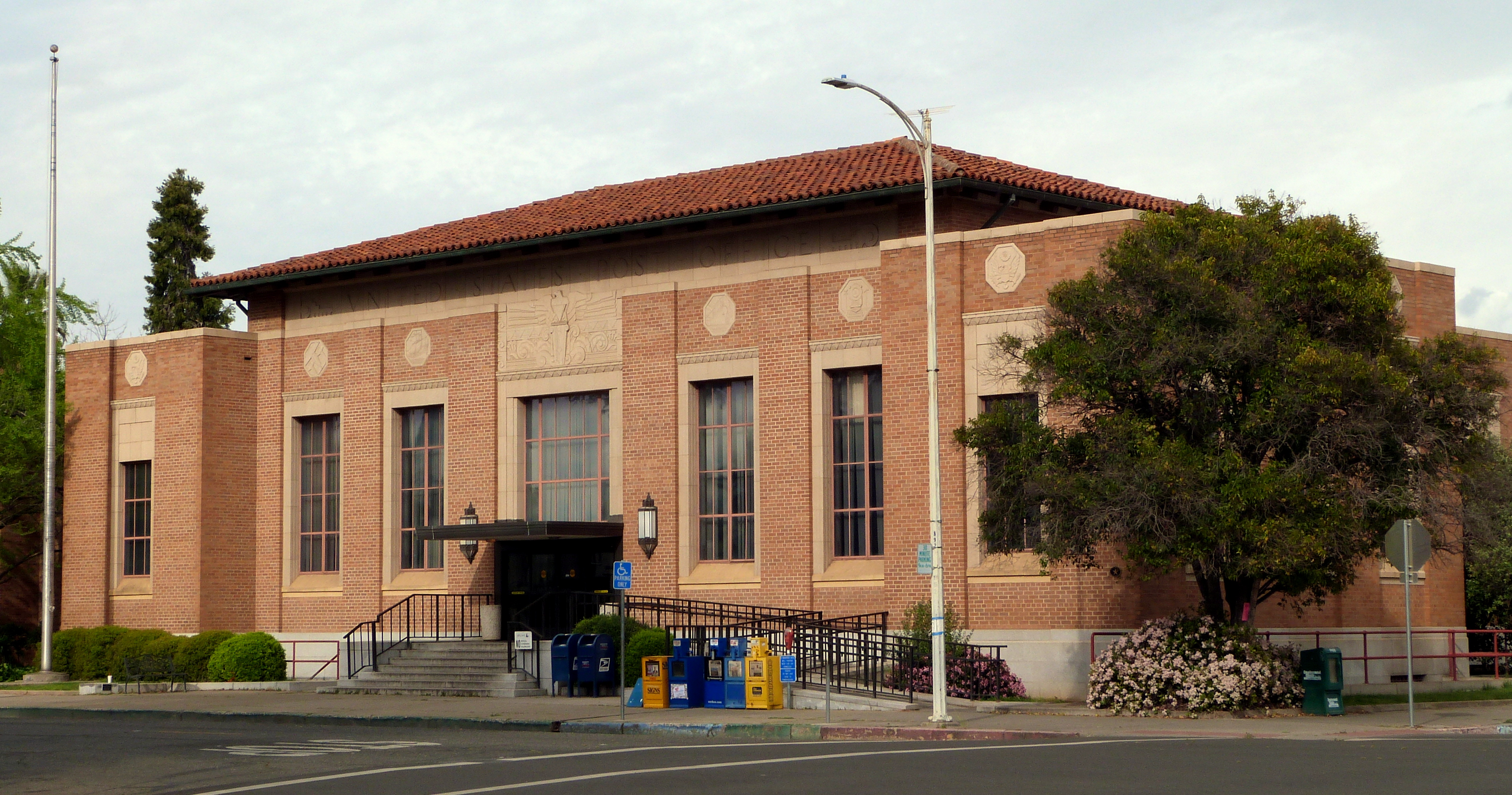
Marysville Post Office.

Municipal policies for the City of Marysville are decided by a five-member city council. Council meetings are held on the first and third Tuesdays of the month at 6 PM in city hall. City council members serve four-year terms.

As of 2025, the council consisted of Mayor Chris Branscum, Vice-Mayor Bruce Buttacavoli, Brad Hudson, Stuart Gilchrist, and Marjorie Rollins.

=== State and federal representation ===
In the California State Legislature, Marysville is in the 1st senatorial district, represented by Republican Megan Dahle, and in the 3rd Assembly district, represented by Vacant.

In the United States House of Representatives, Marysville is in California's 1st congressional district, represented by Republican James Gallagher.

== Education ==
Marysville is served by Marysville Joint Unified School District for its public school system. It has five high schools: Marysville High, Lindhurst High School, Yuba County Career Preparatory Charter School (which is home to the award-winning Automotive Academy), Marysville Charter Academy for the Arts, and Abraham Lincoln Home School.

The city is home to the county's only brick and mortar library of the Yuba County Library system. W.T. Ellis High School was closed June 30, 1993

Yuba College, a public community college, is located in nearby Linda.

== Media ==
The Appeal-Democrat is a newspaper located in Marysville, and serves the Yuba-Sutter Area. The Territorial Dispatch is small weekly free paper. The Sacramento Bee is also widely sold in the city.

Marysville is the setting for Tom Waits' song "Burma Shave", a fictitious account of "... a young girl in a small little town, place called Marysville ... and, uh, it's up around Yuba City, Gridley, Chico, they're all the same, the names are different. It takes, oh, about 23 miles and you're in the next one, they got a Foster's Freeze just like the one you were tryin' to get out of." These lyrics are a precursor to the song, which starts immediately after.

== Transportation ==
Marysville is served by two highways. California State Route 20 is the major east–west route, running to Nevada City to the east, and through Yuba City and Williams to the west, ending just south of Fort Bragg at California State Route 1. California State Route 70 travels south toward Sacramento, and north and east through Quincy to its terminus at U.S. Route 395.

Yuba County Airport is located three miles southeast of Marysville. It has two runways and is mostly used for general aviation.

Local bus service is provided by Yuba Sutter Transit.

Southern Pacific passenger rail service to Marysville ended in 1957. Amtrak's Coast Starlight added Marysville station as a stop in 1982, but the station was bypassed in 1999 and passenger services to the city ceased. As of 2018 Gold Runner trains are being studied to be extended north of Sacramento with a Marysville stop.

The Amtrak Thruway 3 provides thrice daily connections from 858 I Street to/from Sacramento and Stockton

== Parks ==
Marysville has 15 parks and they are classified as community, neighborhood or passive.

=== Community parks ===
==== Ellis Lake ====
See "Sights of Marysville" or "Ellis Lake"

==== East Lake ====
East Lake park is located between 14th and 16th Streets on Yuba Street and sports picnic facilities in a natural setting.

==== Bryant Field ====
City-owned Baseball stadium and home of the Marysville Drakes Baseball team. The facility provides seating for 3000 people.

==== Beckwourth Riverfront Park Complex ====
The city's Beckwourth Riverfront Park is a large complex located on Bizz Johnson Drive adjacent to the Feather River. Amenities include a OHV MotoCross Course, Soccer Fields used by the Yuba Sutter Youth Soccer League, a nature area and Feather River Pavilion, a picnicking area known as Lion's Grove, a boat launch area with restrooms maintained by Redneck Yacht Club a local volunteer group, softball fields and good fishing in the Feather River. Most of these facilities are available for rental. Beckwourth Riverfront Park also hosts the annual Marysville Stampede, a rodeo event featuring Cotton Rosser and his crew.

=== Neighborhood parks ===
==== Gavin Park ====
Located at Johnson Avenue and Val Drive, this park has picnic tables, benches, play equipment and a large open play area.

==== Miner Park ====
Located between Swezy and Sampson Street and East 14th and East 15th, this is one of the largest neighborhood parks. The amenities include play equipment, tot equipment, benches, a picnic table and basketball hoops, as well as a large open play area.

==== Motor Park ====
Formerly known as Market Square Park, this park, located at 14th and G streets, has play equipment, tot equipment, benches, picnic tables, a full court basketball pad and a large open play area.

==== Steven J. Field (circle) Park ====
This small circular shaped park is located on Rideout Way between Greeley Drive and Boulton Way. This park has play equipment, tot equipment, benches, picnic tables and an open play area.

==== Triplett Park ====
Located at Rideout Way and Covillaud Street, this park has picnic tables, benches, play equipment, tot equipment, and a large open play area.

==== Veterans Park ====
Formerly known as Napoleon Square, the name of this park was changed upon the completion of the Veterans Memorial in 2000. The amenities at this park located on 5th Street between G and H streets include play equipment, benches and picnic tables.

==== Yuba Park ====
Located at Yuba Street and East 10th Street, the amenities at this park include play equipment, picnic facilities and a large open play area.

==== Basin Park ====
Located on Hall Street between East 17th and Harris Street in East Marysville, this seasonal park is used for storm drainage storage during the rainy season. When the area is dry, the basin can be used for sports practices.

=== Passive parks ===
==== 3rd and D Street Mini Park ====
Conveniently located in historic downtown Marysville there are benches available for taking a break while shopping.

==== Plaza Park ====
Located at 1st and D Street near the Bok Kai Temple, there are benches and picnic tables available.

==== Washington Park ====
The four corners at 10th and E Street were historically called Washington Square. Picnic tables and large open areas are available for outdoor dining and recreation.

== Arts and culture ==
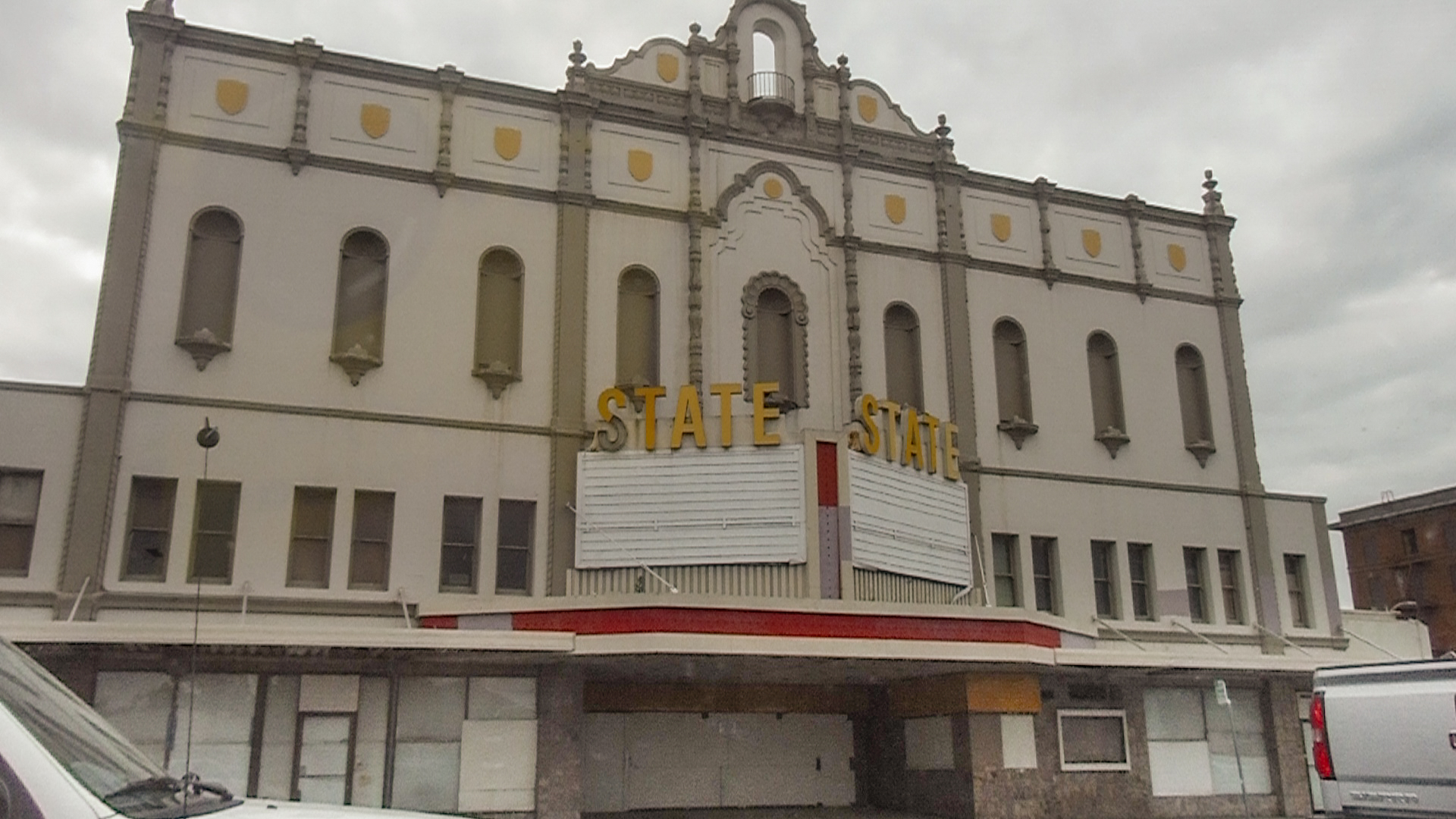
The California Churrigueresque style State Theatre.

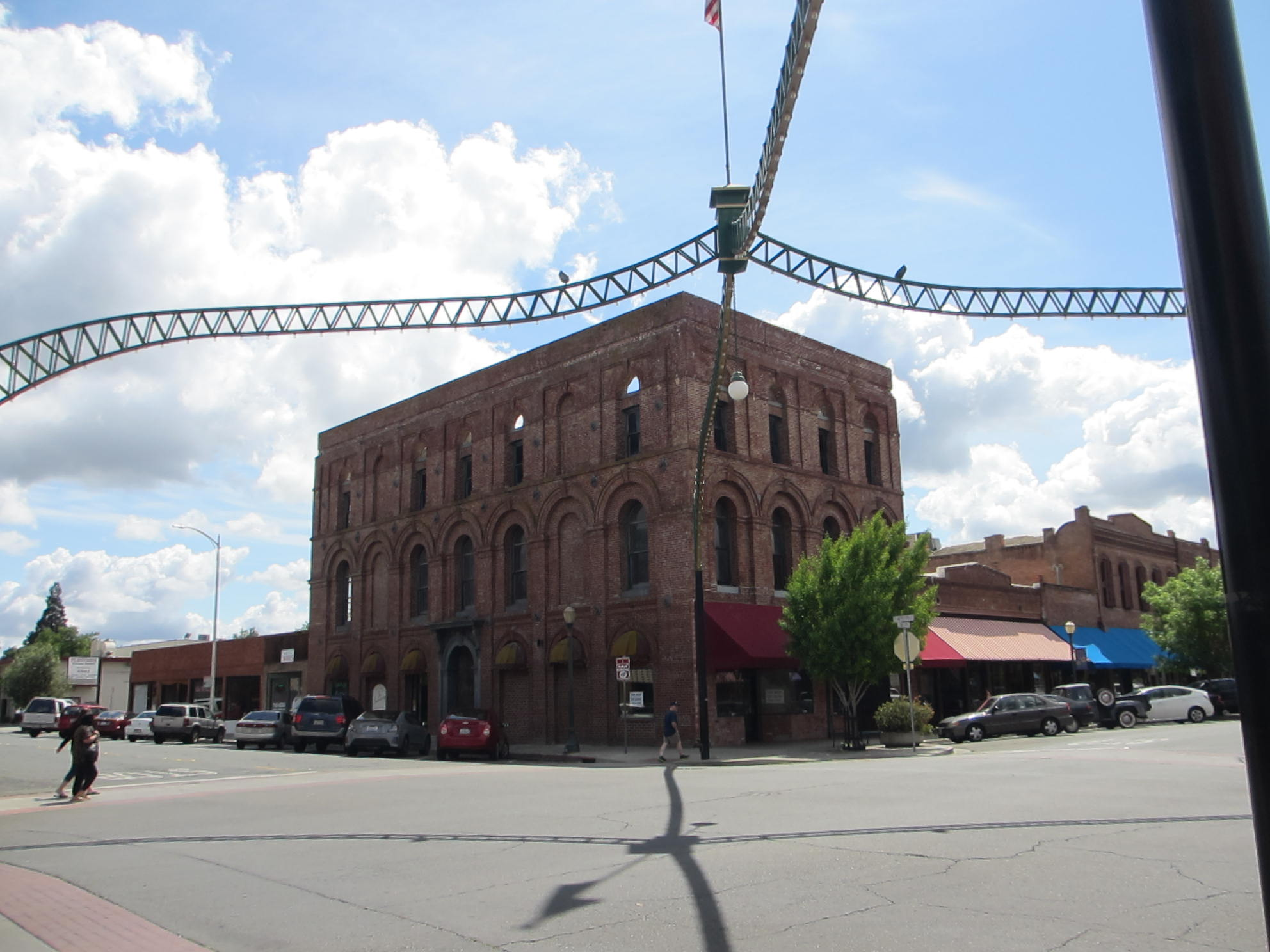
Marysville Historic Commercial District.

=== Mary Aaron Memorial Museum ===
Built in 1855, the Gothic revival residence was one of the first brick structures in the area. The home was designed by Warren P. Miller and is on the National Register of Historic Places. It was home to the Aaron family until 1935, and it is now held in trust by the City of Marysville. The lives of local residents are documented by photographs, clothing, and other furnishings in the changing exhibits, including many of the Chinese community who helped establish Marysville. Admission to the museum is free of charge, and open Fridays and Saturdays.

=== Bok Kai Temple (北溪廟) ===
The Bok Kai Temple was erected in 1854, and rebuilt in 1880, by Chinese residents for the worship of their gods. The most important god worshiped there is Bok Eye, the god of water who has the power to control the rains. The temple remains a focus of the present Marysville Chinese community, who have dedicated themselves to preserving it. It is open on request for tours and visitors.

==== Bok Kai Festival and Parade (北溪慶會) ====
Marysville annually celebrates the Chinese New Year and the god Bok Eye with a festival. The Bok Kai parade has been produced each year since 1880 and is claimed to be the oldest continuing parade in California. Because the festival celebrates Bok Eye according to the Chinese lunar calendar, the date of the parade is different each year. Marching bands, fire trucks, antique cars, floats, and dance groups walk the streets of historic downtown. Over 15,000 spectators each year come to watch the parade's greatest asset, a dragon 175-foot (53 m) long.

The festival concludes with the lighting of "bombs," which are made by hand under special permit from the State of California. Bomb Day is formally called Yee Yuet Yee by the Chinese community. The bombs are fired in a roped arena where young Chinese scramble for "good fortune" rings which are shot into the air by the bursting bombs, traditionally bringing good fortune to the holder throughout the year.

=== Ellis Lake ===
The centerpiece of Marysville is Ellis Lake, a lake surrounded by greenery and sidewalks. It is bounded by 9th Street to the south, B Street to the east, 14th Street to the north and D Street to the west.

Before 1924, Ellis Lake was a swamp. It was not until then that the Women's Improvement Club of Marysville commissioned John McLaren, famed designer of the Golden Gate Park in San Francisco, to turn the swamp into a "beautiful lake". The project was completed in 1939. It was recently renovated, to the current mayor, Bill D. Harris, Sr.

On October 20, 2002, a car was found at the bottom of the lake, in seven feet of water. Inside the car was the skeletal body of Mary Jane Gooding. The Marysville Police Department believes that she accidentally drove her boyfriend's car into the lake on October 10, 1981. Her children thought she was victim of foul play; however, the Marysville Police Department maintains that there is no evidence to support that a crime was committed.

The lake, named for Marysville citizen W. T. Ellis, Jr., offers a pleasant walk, picnic areas, and fishing. For decades, Ellis Lake hosted a 4th of July celebration every year, featuring power boat and cardboard boat races. Youths built boats out of cardboard and duct tape, then tried to cross the lake without sinking. An annual fireworks display was canceled in 2004 after a young girl lost part of her leg due to a rogue firework shot from the island in the center of the lake into the gathered crowd. That year they had twice as many fireworks than usual, which made shooting the fireworks more difficult and dangerous. The lawsuit finally closed 11 months later when the California Department of Forestry & Fire Protection released a report stating that mortar shells burst low into the crowd onto the other side of the lake from Gazebo Island.

In October 2007, the water fountain and lighting display was renovated and upgraded. The lights feature 37 colors and are viewable year-round from 8 pm to midnight. This renovation was made possible by the combined efforts of a group of local citizens who have formed a group called Help Ellis Lake Prosper (H.E.L.P.).

=== California Swan Festival ===
The California Swan Festival, was held from 2013 to 2016, November 13–15, with the central events in Marysville's Caltrans Building.

=== Historic sites ===
The National Register list the following 9 Historic sites and 1 Historic district as cultural resources worthy of preservation, including Bok Kai Temple, Decker-Jewett Bank, Ellis Building, Forbes House, Hart Building, Warren P. Miller House: also known as the "Mary Aaron Museum", Packard Library, Jose Manuel Ramirez House: also known as "The W.T. Ellis House" or "The Castle", the US Post Office - Marysville Main, and Marysville Historic Commercial District.

Other sites of historic interest include homes designed by Julia Morgan, the Hotel Marysville, the State Theater, the Marysville Cemetery, and the Marysville Hebrew Cemetery.

== Notable people ==
- Larry Bagby, actor
- Elwood Bruner, lawyer and politician
- Harry Stuart Fonda, painter, musician and professor.
- Stephen Johnson Field, Associate Justice of the United States Supreme Court
- George Congdon Gorham, Secretary of the United States Senate
- R. H. Macy, operated dry goods store here during Gold Rush
- Kiguma Jack Murata, geochemist
- Leslie M. Palm, United States Marine Corps major general
- Alice Rideout, sculptor
- Joe Rose, former NFL player
- Clara Sheldon Smith, photographer
