= National Register of Historic Places listings in San Luis Obispo County, California =

Location of San Luis Obispo County in California

This is a list of the National Register of Historic Places listings in San Luis Obispo County, California.

This is intended to be a complete list of the properties and districts on the National Register of Historic Places in San Luis Obispo County, California, United States. Latitude and longitude coordinates are provided for many National Register properties and districts; these locations may be seen together in an online map.

There are 38 properties and districts listed on the National Register in the county, including 3 National Historic Landmarks.

This National Park Service list is complete through NPS recent listings posted September 4, 2026.

== Current listings ==
	Name on the Register	Image	Date listed	Location	City or town	Description
1	Administration Building, Atascadero Colony	Administration Building, Atascadero Colony	November 17, 1977 (#77000336)	6500 Palma Ave. 35°29′23″N 120°39′58″W	Atascadero	
2	Ah Louis Store	Ah Louis Store	March 26, 2008 (#08000203)	800 Palm St. 35°16′58″N 120°39′49″W	San Luis Obispo	
3	Myron Angel House	Myron Angel House	November 22, 1982 (#82000988)	714 Buchon St. 35°16′33″N 120°39′39″W	San Luis Obispo	
4	Archeological Site 4 SLO 834		February 25, 1982 (#82004618)	Address Restricted	Atascadero	
5	Arroyo Grande IOOF Hall	Arroyo Grande IOOF Hall	March 22, 1991 (#91000344)	128 Bridge St. 35°07′20″N 120°34′38″W	Arroyo Grande	
6	Atascadero Printery	Atascadero Printery	January 2, 2004 (#00001368)	6351 Olmeda Ave. 35°29′32″N 120°39′56″W	Atascadero	
7	Bank of Italy	Bank of Italy	March 19, 1998 (#98000245)	1245 Park St. 35°37′39″N 120°41′25″W	Paso Robles	
8	Brewster-Dutra House	Brewster-Dutra House	October 29, 1982 (#82000989)	1803 Vine St. 35°37′59″N 120°41′41″W	Paso Robles	
9	Caledonia Adobe	Caledonia Adobe	July 14, 1971 (#71000190)	700 Mission St., 0.5 mi. S of 10th St. 35°44′17″N 120°41′56″W	San Miguel	
10	Call-Booth House	Call-Booth House	November 3, 1988 (#88002031)	1315 Vine St. 35°37′40″N 120°41′40″W	Paso Robles	
11	Carrizo Plain Rock Art Discontiguous District	Carrizo Plain Rock Art Discontiguous District	May 23, 2001 (#01000509)	Address Restricted	California Valley	designated the Carrizo Plain Archeological District National Historic Landmark District March 2, 2012
12	Corral de Piedra	Corral de Piedra	May 22, 1978 (#78000766)	S of San Luis Obispo on Price Canyon Rd. 35°11′37″N 120°37′28″W	San Luis Obispo	
13	Dana Adobe	Dana Adobe	May 6, 1971 (#71000189)	671 S. Oakglen Ave. 35°01′40″N 120°28′09″W	Nipomo	
14	Eight Mile House	Eight Mile House	March 31, 1995 (#95000358)	Off CA 101 on Stagecoach Rd. 35°22′02″N 120°38′17″W	Santa Margarita	
15	Guthrie House	Guthrie House	January 10, 1980 (#80000853)	Burton and Center Sts. 35°33′49″N 121°04′52″W	Cambria	
16	Halcyon Historic District	Halcyon Historic District	March 27, 2017 (#100000783)	Bounded by Halcyon Rd., The Pike, Elm St. and CA 1/Cienega St. 35°06′10″N 120°35′45″W	Halcyon	
17	Hearst San Simeon Estate	Hearst San Simeon Estate	June 22, 1972 (#72000253)	3 mi. NE of San Simeon; 35°41′06″N 121°10′07″W	San Simeon	
18	Robert Jack House	Robert Jack House	April 13, 1992 (#92000312)	536 Marsh St. 35°16′38″N 120°39′53″W	San Luis Obispo	
19	Lincoln School		November 21, 2001 (#01001244)	9000 Chimney Rock Rd. 35°40′05″N 120°51′18″W	Paso Robles	
20	Mission San Miguel Arcangel	Mission San Miguel Arcangel	July 14, 1971 (#71000191)	775 Mission St. (old US 101); 35°44′41″N 120°41′53″W	San Miguel	
21	Monday Club of San Luis Obispo	Monday Club of San Luis Obispo	May 10, 2016 (#16000230)	1815 Monterey St. 35°17′19″N 120°39′05″W	San Luis Obispo	
22	MONTEBELLO (shipwreck and remains)		September 27, 2016 (#16000636)	Off the coast 35°35′00″N 121°16′00″W	Cambria	
23	Morro Bay State Park Trailer and Tent Campground	Morro Bay State Park Trailer and Tent Campground	October 15, 2014 (#14000852)	20 State Park Rd. 35°20′49″N 120°50′19″W	Morro Bay	
24	Old Santa Rosa Catholic Church and Cemetery	Old Santa Rosa Catholic Church and Cemetery	October 29, 1982 (#82000990)	Main St. 35°33′58″N 121°04′48″W	Cambria	
25	Pacific Coast Railway Company Grain Warehouse	Pacific Coast Railway Company Grain Warehouse	June 23, 1988 (#88000921)	65 Higuera St. 35°16′22″N 120°39′54″W	San Luis Obispo	
26	Paso Robles Almond Growers Association Warehouse	Paso Robles Almond Growers Association Warehouse	March 22, 2016 (#16000095)	525 Riverside Ave. 35°37′13″N 120°41′13″W	Paso Robles	
27	Paso Robles Carnegie Library	Paso Robles Carnegie Library	January 26, 1998 (#97001635)	City Park, 800 12th St. 35°37′34″N 120°41′24″W	Paso Robles	
28	Pereira Octagon Barn	Pereira Octagon Barn	January 15, 2014 (#13001068)	4400 Octagon Wy. 35°14′13″N 120°40′47″W	San Luis Obispo	
29	Piedras Blancas Light Station	Piedras Blancas Light Station	September 3, 1991 (#91001095)	CA 1 on Point Piedras Blancas; 35°39′57″N 121°17′02″W	San Simeon	
30	Port San Luis Site	Port San Luis Site	May 22, 1978 (#78000767)	Address Restricted	San Luis Obispo	
31	The Powerhouse	The Powerhouse	July 30, 1993 (#93000670)	Jct. of S. Perimeter Rd. and Cuesta Ave., NE corner 35°17′57″N 120°39′45″W	San Luis Obispo	
32	John Price House	John Price House	November 3, 1988 (#88002013)	100 Rancho Pismo Dr. 35°08′49″N 120°37′49″W	Pismo Beach	
33	Rancho Cañada de los Osos y Pecho y Islay	Rancho Cañada de los Osos y Pecho y Islay	June 20, 1975 (#75000477)	Address Restricted	Los Osos	
34	San Luis Obispo Carnegie Library	San Luis Obispo Carnegie Library	March 30, 1995 (#95000357)	696 Monterey St. 35°16′49″N 120°39′50″W	San Luis Obispo	
35	San Luis Obispo Light Station	San Luis Obispo Light Station	September 3, 1991 (#91001093)	Point San Luis; 35°09′42″N 120°45′26″W	Avila Beach	
36	William Shipsey House	William Shipsey House	March 31, 2010 (#10000115)	1266 Mill St. 35°17′09″N 120°39′32″W	San Luis Obispo	
37	Tognini and Ghezzi Building		September 23, 2025 (#100012304)	152 N Ocean Avenue; 35°26′57″N 120°54′18″W	Cayucos	
38	Tribune-Republic Building	Tribune-Republic Building	June 24, 1993 (#93000548)	1763 Santa Barbara St. 35°16′33″N 120°39′21″W	San Luis Obispo	

== See also ==
- List of National Historic Landmarks in California
- National Register of Historic Places listings in California
- California Historical Landmarks in San Luis Obispo County, California
