= City of San Luis Obispo Historic Resources =

The City of San Luis Obispo Historic Resources consists of buildings and sites designated by the City of San Luis Obispo, California, as historic resources.

A map displaying the locations of San Luis Obispo's designated historic resources can be viewed by clicking "OpenStreetMap" in the template found to the right below.

== Legal foundation and purpose of designation ==
The designation of historic resources in City of San Luis Obispo is the responsibility of the city's Cultural Heritage Committee (CHC), a group with seven members appointed by the City Council. The CHC is broadly responsible for researching, identifying, and protecting historic buildings, archaeological sites and cultural features. Under the City's Historic Preservation Ordinance, historic resources must exhibit "a high level of historic integrity," be at least 50 years old, and satisfy specified architectural or historic criteria, including associations with a notable architect, architectural design or style, historic person, historic event, or physical integrity.

In 2013, the City also published a Citywide Historic Context Statement which places the City's historic resources "in the appropriate historic, social, and architectural context" in order to establish "the relationship between an area’s physical environment and its broader history." The Historic Context Statement is available on the City's website.

The City has also published "Historic Preservation Program Guidelines" which are also available on the City's website.

== Overlap with other registries ==
Three of the City's designated historic resources have also been designated as California Historic Landmarks. They are: Mission San Luis Obispo de Tolosa (CHL 325); Dallidet Adobe (CHL 720); and Ah Louis Store (CHL 802).

In addition, eight of the City's designated historic resources have been listed on the National Register of Historic Places (NRHP). They are: Myron Angel House (NRHP 11/22/82); Pacific Coast Railway Company Grain Warehouse (NRHP 6/23/88); Robert Jack House (NRHP 4/13/92); Tribune-Republic Building (NRHP 6/24/93); San Luis Obispo Carnegie Library (NRHP 3/30/95); Ah Louis Store (NRHP 3/26/08); William Shipsey House (NRHP 3/31/10); and Monday Club of San Luis Obispo (NRHP 5/10/16).

There are also two sites listed on the NRHP but not included in the City's register of historic resources. They are The Powerhouse (NRHP 7/30/93) on the CalPoly campus and the San Luis Obispo Octagon Barn (NRHP 1/15/14).

== San Luis Obispo Historic Resources ==
#	Name	Image	Location	Historic District	Built	Description
1	Andrews Adobe (aka El Rancho Alisal, Wolfe Residence, Wilkinson Adobe)		1451 Andrews; 35.285955°N 120.646584°W		1790s	Two-story clapboard covered adobe; originally a one-story house built prior to 1800 under supervision of the Mission padres and believed to be the residence of the Mission orchards' mayordomo; believed to be the second oldest surviving structure in the county; acquired by J.P. Andrews c. 1870; second story added 1906
2	Manderscheid House		963 Broad; 35.280583°N 120.665125°W	Downtown HD	1891	Owned in early 1900s by Pacific Coast Railway conductor Richard Manderscheid
3	Dutton House		1426 Broad; 35.276135°N 120.662028°W	Old Town HD	1904-08	
4	Miller House		1435 Broad; 35.276039°N 120.661937°W	Old Town HD	1897	
5	Vetterline House		1504 Broad; 35.275693°N 120.66162°W	Old Town HD	1895-1900	
6	Maier House		1411 Broad; 35.276413°N 120.662291°W	Old Town HD	1933	
7	Falkenstein House		1445 Broad; 35.275925°N 120.66183°W	Old Town HD	1895	
8	McKennon House		1510 Broad; 35.275592°N 120.661531°W	Old Town HD	1890	
9	Renetzky House		1516 Broad; 35.275459°N 120.661412°W	Old Town HD	1904	
10	Tucker House		1530 Broad; 35.275375°N 120.661338°W	Old Town HD	1905	
11	Brazil House		148 Broad; 35.289963°N 120.671716°W		1931-33	
12	Bradbury House		745 Buchon; 35.276272°N 120.661125°W	Old Town HD	1910	One-story "Neo-Classic rowhouse" built for Dr. Richard Bradbury who built the Bradbury Sanitarium next door one year later
13	Stanton House (aka Silvaggio Home, Lewin Home)		752 Buchon; 35.276334°N 120.661023°W	Old Town HD	1903-05	17-room Victorian Shingle Cottage in Queen Anne style with Neo-Classic elements; built for Edward Stanton, an officer of the Pacific Coast Railroad, and his wife Irene, a daughter of Charles William Dana.
14	Manuel Marshall House (aka Dixon Home)		785 Buchon; 35.276681°N 120.660434°W	Old Town HD	1899	Neo-Classic House with elements of a Queen Anne cottage; the original owner Manuel Marshall was a prominent jeweler
15	Fred Crossett House (aka Boatman House)		896 Buchon; 35.277434°N 120.659106°W	Old Town HD	1914-18	Two-story Craftsman bungalow
16	Myron Angel House		714 Buchon; 35.275833°N 120.660833°W	Old Town HD	c. 1880	Two-story wood-frame hous was the home from 1889-1911 of Myron Angel, the main force behind the founding of California Polytechnic State University; listed on the National Register of Historic Places (NRHP) in 1982
17	Jessie Wright Maternity Home (aka Estrada House)		726 Buchon; 35.276129°N 120.66136°W	Old Town HD	1900	Wood frame home in Carpenter Gothic Revival style with Queen Anne elements and a Neo-Colonial porch; operated as a maternity home in the 1920s
18	Bradbury Sanitarium (also known as Pacific Hospital)		743 Buchon; 35.276188°N 120.661262°W	Old Town HD	1911-12	Built by Dr. Richard Bradbury as a sanitarium; Classical Revival style later vernacularized as "American Four Square"; later used for military housing in World War II; became an apartment building after the war
19	Ed Kaiser House (aka Carpenter House)		751 Buchon; 35.276352°N 120.660994°W	Old Town HD	1904-08	Two-story Colonial Revival, American Four Square house with Doric columns; was the home of cigar dealer and bar owner, Ed Kaiser
20	Nathaniel Brew House		771 Buchon; 35.276329°N 120.660551°W	Old Town HD	1903	Home with eclectic design including Carpenter Gothic and Neo-Colonial styles; owned by Nathaniel Brew who operated a furniture and carpet business
21	Upham House (aka Trousdale Home, Soderberg Home)		779 Buchon; 35.276603°N 120.660569°W	Old Town HD	1898	Two-story home in Carpenter Gothic style with Neo-Classic elements
22	Jacob Crocker House (aka Gerety Residence)		793 Buchon; 35.276691°N 120.660232°W	Old Town HD	1901-02	Ornate two-story Queen Anne house with Colonial Revival influence built for Jacob Crocker, a prosperous businessman and merchant
23	A. F. Fitzgerald House (aka Kimball Home)		794 Buchon; 35.276791°N 120.660404°W	Old Town HD	1902	Two-story Italianate house built by Joseph Maino for A. F. Fitzgerald, a prominent businessman who was involved in the founding of Cal Poly
24	Clark/Norton House (aka Greystone House)		850 Buchon; 35.276996°N 120.659885°W	Old Town HD	1904-08	Two-story vernacular Neo-Colonial house with pronounced horizontal orientation; served as the residence of two SLO mayors over the years, Elmer Clark and Thomas Norton; when built by Clark it was the largest home in SLO at 4,500 square feet
25	Hourihan House (aka Campbell House)		860 Buchon; 35.277174°N 120.659568°W	Old Town HD	1895	Two-story Carpenter Gothic Revival house, built for Thomas and Kate Hourihan, ranchers from Arroyo Grande
26	Pete Paulson House (aka Fred Cossett House)		890 Buchon; 35.27736°N 120.659238°W	Old Town HD	1919	Classic Revival house in Craftsman style with Prairie School elements; built for Pete Paulson, a salesman for the Channel Commercial Company
27	Fleuger House		1546 Chorro; 35.276139°N 120.659529°W	Old Town HD	1903	
28	Aston House		1746 Chorro; 35.27465°N 120.658202°W		1903	
29	Wade Building		1026 Chorro; 35.280258°N 120.663202°W	Downtown HD	1909	
30	Dughi Building		1029 Chorro; 35.280171°N 120.663127°W	Downtown HD	1885	
31	Wickenden Building		1033 Chorro; 35.280175°N 120.66313°W	Downtown HD	1885	
32	Sauer/Adams Adobe		964 Chorro; 35.281066°N 120.663918°W	Chinatown HD	1800/1860	Original adobe built c. 1800; second story added 1860
33	Brooks House		1518 Chorro; 35.276399°N 120.659767°W	Old Town HD	1890	
34	Regan House		1306 Chorro; 35.278208°N 120.661379°W		1883	
35	Mazza House		1318 Chorro; 35.278037°N 120.661238°W		1906	
36	Finney House		1907 Chorro; 35.273371°N 120.657321°W		1890	
37	Mancilla/Freitas Adobe		868 Chorro; 35.281836°N 120.664609°W		1850	
38	Rosa Butron Adobe		466 Dana; 35.277811°N 120.668832°W	Downtown HD	1860	
39	Anderson House		532 Dana; 35.278461°N 120.667816°W	Downtown HD	1898	
40	Barneberg House		550 Dana; 35.278621°N 120.667541°W	Downtown HD	1914	Two-story Neo-Classical style house with Craftsman and Prairie School overtones; built by James Maino for J. W. Barneberg, president of the Commercial Bank and one of the City's first millionaires; later known as Duenow Residence
41	Frank Anderson House		1345 Broad; 35.276683°N 120.662545°W	Old Town HD	1910-14	One-story Neo-Classical rowhouse/Victorial cottage built for Frank Anderson, a lineman for Pacific Telephone and Telegraph Co.
42	Goldtree/McCafrey House		1212 Garden; 35.278369°N 120.662563°W		1898	
43	Union Hardware Building		1119 Garden; 35.279076°N 120.663213°W	Downtown HD	1912	
44	Smith Building		1123 Garden; 35.278984°N 120.663131°W	Downtown HD	1924-25	
45	Laird Building		1129 Garden; 35.27884°N 120.663004°W	Downtown HD	1883	
46	Stover Building		1130 Garden; 35.278861°N 120.663022°W	Downtown HD	1913	
47	Weill House		2132 Harris; 35.270496°N 120.663513°W		1889	
48	Golden State Creamery		570 Higuera; 35.277763°N 120.666483°W	Downtown HD	1910	
49	Greenfield Building		719 Higuera; 35.278924°N 120.664363°W	Downtown HD	1905	
50	Kluver Cigar		726 Higuera; 35.279123°N 120.664168°W	Downtown HD	1897	Home of the Kluver & Sons Pioneer Cigar factory operated by George Kluver
51	Carrisa Building		736 Higuera; 35.279229°N 120.663984°W	Downtown HD	1906	
52	Vollmer Grocery		740 Higuera; 35.279288°N 120.66388°W	Downtown HD	1890	
53	Bank of America Building		767 Higuera; 35.279552°N 120.66342°W	Downtown HD	1901-02	
54	Doton Building		777 Higuera; 35.279629°N 120.663287°W	Downtown HD	1931	
55	Johnson Building		796 Higuera; 35.279848°N 120.662902°W	Downtown HD	1903-04	
56	Commercial Bank Building		799 Higuera; 35.27999°N 120.662666°W	Downtown HD	1891	
57	Tower Building/H. M. Warden Building		842 Higuera; 35.279798°N 120.662989°W	Downtown HD	1904	Two-story commercial building; built as an office building by Horatio M. Warden; ornate clock tower removed after 1925 Santa Barbara earthquake; became Tower Building prior to World War II; first floor extensively altered
58	Goldtree Block/Hotel Wineman		849 Higuera; 35.280212°N 120.662303°W	Downtown HD	1883/1930	Large commercial building originally operated as a general merchandise store the Goldtree Brothers; the Wineman Hotel opened at the location in 1931; ground floor was Riley's Department Store from 1955 to 1993
59	A. F. Fitzgerald Building		852 Higuera; 35.280034°N 120.662592°W	Downtown HD	1903	
60	Sandercock Transfer Building		856 Higuera; 35.280058°N 120.662553°W	Downtown HD	1890	Home of Sandercock Transfer Co., a drayage company that delivered freight for the Pacific Coast Railway
61	H. H. Waite Planing Mill		236 Higuera; 35.270834°N 120.670142°W		1883	
62	Loomis Feed Co. Warehouse		75 Higuera; 35.272778°N 120.665°W		1885	Wood frame building with corrugated iron paneling; only surviving building from the Pacific Coast Railway's headquarters as well as the only extant grain storage building in San Luis Obispo; listed on the NRHP in 1988
63	Sandercock House		591 Islay; 35.274199°N 120.66252°W	Old Town HD	1910	
64	Fitzpatrick House		670 Islay; 35.274746°N 120.661616°W	Old Town HD	1880	
65	Erickson House		461 Islay; 35.27305°N 120.664393°W		1900	
66	Vollmer House		497 Islay; 35.27343°N 120.663792°W		1890	
67	Vollmer House		1116 Pismo; 35.279966°N 120.656942°W	Old Town HD	1912	
68	Sandercock House		535 Islay; 35.273661°N 120.663414°W	Old Town HD	1910	
69	Dana/Parsons House		644 Islay; 35.274469°N 120.662072°W	Old Town HD	1875	
70	Erickson House		687 Islay; 35.274913°N 120.66134°W	Old Town HD	1894-95	
71	Kimball House		690 Islay; 35.274948°N 120.661283°W	Old Town HD	1900	
72	Jackson House		790 Islay; 35.275932°N 120.659668°W	Old Town HD	1910	
73	Fumigalli House		463 Islay; 35.273177°N 120.664192°W		1900	
74	The Judge's House		1720 Johnson; 35.279701°N 120.651148°W		1892-1906	
75	Buckley House		777 Johnson; 35.286261°N 120.658962°W	Mill Street HD	1890	
76	Post House		1019 Leff; 35.276779°N 120.656267°W	Old Town HD	1900	
77	Madonna Inn		100 Madonna; 35.2675°N 120.67472°W		1961-69	Motel built by Alex Madonna along US Route 101; features a pseudo-Swiss-Alps exterior and lavish common rooms accented by pink roses, Western murals, and hammered copper; 110 uniquely designed and themed guest rooms and suites
78	Esquar House		1117 Marsh; 35.281453°N 120.65838°W		1888	
79	Stover's Sanitarium		1160 Marsh; 35.282004°N 120.657503°W		1911	
80	Graves House		1167 Marsh; 35.281935°N 120.657613°W		1929	
81	Kaetzel House		547 Marsh; 35.276888°N 120.66595°W		1882	
82	Snyder Building		774 Marsh; 35.278805°N 120.662744°W	Downtown HD	1925	
83	Ramage House		1129 Marsh; 35.281497°N 120.658311°W		1905	
84	Shipman House		1135 Marsh; 35.281556°N 120.658217°W		1888	
85	The Nurse's House		1141 Marsh; 35.28161°N 120.658131°W		1890	
86	Faulkner House		1145 Marsh; 35.281654°N 120.65806°W		1915	
87	Reid House		1305 Marsh; 35.283121°N 120.655765°W		1930	
88	Robert Jack House		536 Marsh; 35.277222°N 120.664722°W		1880	Two-story Italianate-style house operated by the city as a museum and events center; listed on the NRHP in 1992
89	Masonic Temple		859 Marsh; 35.279372°N 120.661773°W		1913	
90	U.S. Post Office		893 Marsh; 35.279683°N 120.661278°W		1925	
91	First Presbyterian Church		951 Marsh; 35.28007°N 120.660651°W		1905	English Arts and Crafts style church built using granite quarried from nearby Bishop Peak
92	Frederick Hart Building		981 Marsh; 35.280108°N 120.660588°W		1928	
93	William Shipsey House		1266 Mill; 35.285853°N 120.658906°W	Mill Street HD	1890	Home built with Queen Anne and Stick/Eastlake elements; listed on NRHP in 2010
94	Smith House		1306 Mill; 35.286055°N 120.658572°W	Mill Street HD	1905	
95	Maino House		1424 Mill; 35.287129°N 120.656778°W		1926	
96	Mugler House		1460 Mill; 35.287311°N 120.656459°W		1925	
97	Muscio House		1330 Mill; 35.286348°N 120.658097°W	Mill Street HD	1909	
98	Hays/Lattimer Adobe		642 Monterey; 35.279487°N 120.665685°W	Downtown HD	1860	
99	Mission San Luis		782 Monterey; 35.28031°N 120.664666°W	Downtown HD	1812	Spanish mission founded in 1772 by Father Junípero Serra
100	Fremont Theater		1035 Monterey; 35.282162°N 120.660767°W	Downtown HD	1941	Streamline Moderne theater designed by architect S. Charles Lee
101	Dr. George Nichols House		664 Monterey; 35.279712°N 120.665295°W	Downtown HD	1907	One-story Colonial Revival house
102	San Luis Obispo Carnegie Library		696 Monterey; 35.280278°N 120.663889°W	Downtown HD	1905	Richardsonian Romanesque Carnegie library faced in red brick with yellow sandstone trim; listed on NRHP in 1995; operated as the county's historical museum since 1956
103	Murray Adobe		747 Monterey; 35.27991°N 120.664984°W	Downtown HD	1850	Two-room adobe; used by Walter Murray as a residence and later to house the printing press for his newspaper, the Tribune; later owned by the City and served as office for the Historical Resources survey in the early 1980s
104	Sauer Bakery		848 Monterey; 35.280705°N 120.663119°W	Downtown HD	1875	Two-story commercial structure; extensive alterations have covered its original character
105	Sinsheimer Building		849 Monterey; 35.280684°N 120.663155°W	Downtown HD	1884	First floor was a general store operated by Sinsheimer Brothers; second floor was used for offices; only known cast iron facade on the Central Coast
106	Muzio's Grocery		868 Monterey; 35.280875°N 120.662827°W	Downtown HD	1912	Grocery store operated by Italian immigrants; customers included William Randolph Hearst
107	Anderson Hotel		955 Monterey; 35.28129°N 120.662165°W	Downtown HD	1922-23	Elegant Mediterranean style five-story hotel designed for J.C. Anderson, was the tallest building in downtown
108	Brunner Building (aka Woodman of the World Hall)		962 Monterey; 35.28138°N 120.662021°W	Downtown HD	1922-23	Two-story Renaissance Revival building; originally operated with Moose lodge on second floor and retail on ground floor
109	J. P. Andrews Building		998 Monterey; 35.281691°N 120.661537°W	Downtown HD	1893-1906	Two-story commercial building, it originally housed Andrews Bank
110	Monday Club		1815 Monterey; 35.288551°N 120.651366°W		1933	Designed by Julia Morgan; listed on the NRHP
111	Milestone Motel Inn		2223 Monterey; 35.291513°N 120.647748°W		1924-25	Claimed as the first motel in the world, closed in 1991; now the administrative building of the Apple Farm hotel next door
112	Snyder House		1406 Morro; 35.278056°N 120.65944°W	Old Town HD	1885	
113	Bullard House		1624 Morro; 35.276256°N 120.657828°W	Old Town HD	1905	
114	Baker House		1636 Morro; 35.276494°N 120.658043°W	Old Town HD	1900	
115	Albert House		1642 Morro; 35.276447°N 120.658°W	Old Town HD	1900	
116	Rogers House		1428 Nipomo; 35.2754°N 120.663255°W	Old Town HD	1890	
117	Harmony Creamery		991 Nipomo; 35.279535°N 120.666978°W	Downtown HD	1929	
118	St. Stephen's Episcopal Church		1344 Nipomo; 35.276416°N 120.664043°W	Old Town HD	1873	
119	Patton House		1407 Nipomo; 35.275712°N 120.663544°W	Old Town HD	1913	
120	Nichols House		1446 Nipomo; 35.275181°N 120.663053°W	Old Town HD	1903	
121	Parsons House		1204 Nipomo; 35.278225°N 120.658161°W		1919	
122	M. F. Avila House		1443 Osos; 35.278225°N 120.658161°W	Old Town HD	1927-29	
123	Park/Reidy Hotel		1815 Osos; 35.275672°N 120.655847°W	Railroad HD	1907	
124	Teass House		890 Osos; 35.282825°N 120.662242°W	Downtown HD	1929	
125	County Courthouse		976 Osos; 35.282255°N 120.661729°W	Downtown HD	1941	Art Deco building operated as the county courthouse until the 1960s; now houses the County Department of Planning and Building
126	Allen House		1700 Osos; 35.276551°N 120.656644°W	Old Town HD	1900	
127	Hageman Sanitarium		1716 Osos; 35.276103°N 120.656305°W	Old Town HD	1895	
128	First Baptist Church		1301 Osos; 35.279466°N 120.659283°W		1907	Currently operated as SLO Adventist Church
129	Kundert Medical Building		1106 Pacific; 35.280685°N 120.657849°W		1956	One of Frank Lloyd Wright's final designs, opened for patients Labor Day 1956
130	Dallidet Adobe		1185 Pacific; 35.281139°N 120.657145°W		1856	Operated by the county historical society since 1953; California Historical Landmark No. 720
131	Zion Lutheran Church		863 Pacific; 35.278701°N 120.661053°W		1909-10	Currently operated as offices for Design Collaborative 2
132	Ah Louis Store		800 Palm; 35.282778°N 120.663611°W	Chinatown HD	1884	Commercial structure built by Chinese businessman Ah Louis using bricks from his own brickyard; listed on NRHP in 2008
133	Michael Righetti House (aka Ernest Graves House)		1314 Palm; 35.285278°N 120.657814°W	Mill Street HD	1877 or 1889	Queen Anne house
134	Righetti Apartments		1305 Palm; 35.285262°N 120.657841°W	Mill Street HD	1929	
135	Payne House		1144 Palm; 35.284034°N 120.659951°W		1911-13	
136	Sandford House		71 Palomar; 35.291924°N 120.67431°W		1890	
137	J. Maino House		1127 Peach; 35.285459°N 120.661619°W		1908	
138	Maino/Righetti House		1128 Peach; 35.285448°N 120.661638°W		1910	
139	Thorne House		1123 Pismo; 35.279953°N 120.656962°W	Old Town HD	1906	
140	Biddle House		559 Pismo; 35.275448°N 120.664437°W	Old Town HD	1889	
141	McManus House		649 Pismo; 35.276087°N 120.663365°W	Old Town HD	1901	
142	Lewin House		671 Pismo; 35.27631°N 120.662989°W	Old Town HD	1890	
143	Greenfield House		676 Pismo; 35.27639°N 120.662853°W	Old Town HD	1890	
144	Old Gas Works		280 Pismo; 35.273134°N 120.66825°W	1902		
145	Southern Pacific Depot		1011 Railroad; 35.276657°N 120.654709°W	Railroad HD	1943	Railroad depot listed on the NRHP in 1993
146	Tribune-Republic Building		1763 Santa Barbara; 35.275708°N 120.656477°W	Railroad HD	1873	Housed the printing press and offices of four successive SLO newspapers (including the Tribune and the Daily Republic) from 1873-1901; moved to its current location in 1905; the oldest wooden commercial building in SLO
147	Call Hotel		1703 Santa Barbara; 35.276251°N 120.656586°W	Railroad HD	1886	
148	Channel Commercial Company		1763 Santa Barbara; 35.275708°N 120.656477°W	Railroad HD	1912	
149	Southern Pacific Warehouse		1940 Santa Barbara; 35.273475°N 120.656231°W	Railroad HD	1900	
150	Kindergarten School		1445 Santa Rosa; 35.279308°N 120.657053°W	Old Town HD	1917	
151	Adriance Court		1531 Santa Rosa; 35.278327°N 120.656183°W	Old Town HD	1921	Housing for railroad workers built by Walter Adriance, a train dispatcher for Southern Pacific.
152	Chapek House		843 Upham; 35.273896°N 120.657049°W		1921	
153	San Luis Obispo City Hall		990 Palm; 35.282532°N 120.662456°W	Downtown HD	1951	
154	Kaufman House		1052 Islay; 35.277899°N 120.656448°W		1915	
155	Southern Pacific Water Tower		1100 Iris; 35.276215°N 120.653257°W		1940	
156	Edward F. Bushnell House		1105 George; 35.275538°N 120.653263°W		1906	
157	Division of Highways District 5 Office		50 Higuera; 35.264076°N 120.670554°W		1931	
158	La Loma De La Nopalera Adobe		1590 Lizzie; 35.279888°N 120.648384°W		1780	
159	Heritage Inn		978 Olive; 35.286563°N 120.665555°W		1905	
160	Rodriguez Adobe		1341 Purple Sage; 35.24628°N 120.629997°W		1850	
161	SLO High School Gymnasium		1499 San Luis; 35.284576°N 120.652565°W		1936	
162	S. Long/Bonetti Ranch		3897 Higuera; 35.286397°N 120.652653°W		1880	
163	William M. Duff House		1717 Santa Barbara; 35.276101°N 120.656557°W	Railroad HD	1901	
164	Alexander Galewski House		1725 Santa Barbara; 35.27598°N 120.656533°W	Railroad HD	1904	
165	Oliver House		1953 Chorro; 35.272625°N 120.657329°W		1890-1910	
166	Martha Dunlap House		1511 Morro; 35.277268°N 120.658737°W	Old Town HD	1916	
167	J. J. Dunne House		59 Benton; 35.291958°N 120.670767°W		1927	
168	Solomon Foreman House		1500 Eto; 35.254668°N 120.695652°W		1878	
169	SP Transportation Co. Bldg.		1021 Railroad; 35.276546°N 120.654729°W	Railroad HD		
170	Southern Pacific Roundhouse		1335 Roundhouse; 35.2705°N 120.654776°W	Railroad HD	1901-13	
171	Chris Anholm House		375 Chorro; 35.286377°N 120.668422°W		1919-20	
172	Bittick Residence		1902 Chorro; 35.273592°N 120.657319°W		1912-13	
173	Old SLO High School Classroom		2030 Johnson; 35.276928°N 120.64866°W		1908	
174	Frank Campbell Mitchell House		1429 Osos; 35.278394°N 120.658314°W	Old Town HD	1884-85	
175	Laird House		1323 Mill; 35.286185°N 120.658361°W	Mill Street HD	1931	
176	Burch House		1333 Mill; 35.28633°N 120.658125°W	Mill Street HD	1915	
177	Faulstich House		2243 Santa Ynez; 35.292468°N 120.646816°W		1928	
178	Old Fire Station Building		750 Pismo; 35.277022°N 120.6618°W		1941	
179	Gregg House		1118 Palm; 35.283754°N 120.660404°W		1894	
180	Michael C. Halpin House		116 Chorro; 35.290197°N 120.669738°W		1930	
181	Charles John Kelly		1352 Pacific; 35.282932°N 120.654355°W		1921	
182	Louisiana Clayton Dart		1318 Pacific; 35.282571°N 120.654873°W		1912	
183	Harry E. Lyman House		868 Upham; 35.273995°N 120.656875°W		1912	
184	David Norcross Residence		546 Higuera; 35.277242°N 120.667352°W			
185	Robert Pollard House		535 Higuera; 35.277103°N 120.667579°W			
186	Theresa Torres True House		1214 Mill; 35.285309°N 120.659827°W			
187	Leonard Hill House		1144 Buchon; 35.279419°N 120.655844°W	|		

== San Luis Obispo Historic Districts ==
Name	Image	Boundaries	Description
Downtown Historic District		Generally bounded by Palm Street to the north, Marsh Street to the south, Osos Street to the east, and Nipomo Street to the west, plus Dana Street in the northwest	Covers the oldest part of SLO including the Mission San Luis Obispo de Tolosa and many commercial structures from the city's boom era from the 1890s to the 1910s. Covers 61.5 acres
Old Town Historic District		Generally bounded by Pacific Street on the north, Islay Street on the south, Santa Rosa Street on the east, and Beach Street on the west	Established in 1987, the district covers 86 acres in SLO's oldest residential neighborhoods with historic homes dating from the 1880s to the turn of the century.
Chinatown Historic District		Both sides of Palm Street between Chorro and Morro Streets	Established in 1995 to recognize the contributions of SLO's Chinese community; consists of 4.4 acres
Mill Street Historic District		Peach Street on the north, Palm Street on the south, Pepper Street on the east and Toro Street on the west	Established in 1987, consists of 20 acres along a tree-lined street with early 20th century homes in the Tudor Revival, Craftsman, Mission Revival, Prairie Colonial, and Shingle styles. Sometimes referred to as Fremont Heights
Railroad Historic District		Bounded by the railroad right-of-way on the east, Johnson Avenue on the north, Orcutt Road on the south, Leff Street on the northwest, and Broad Street on the west	Established in 1998 along the historic boundaries of the Southern Pacific rail yard. It includes residential and commercial resources constructed following the arrival of the Southern Pacific Railroad in 1894. Covers 80.7 acres

== See also ==
- National Register of Historic Places listings in San Luis Obispo County, California
- California Historical Landmarks in San Luis Obispo County, California
