= California Historical Landmarks in San Luis Obispo County =

This list includes properties and districts listed on the California Historical Landmark listing in San Luis Obispo County, California. Click the "Map of all coordinates" link to the right to view a Google map of all properties and districts with latitude and longitude coordinates in the table below.

Image		Landmark name	Location	City or town	Summary
Ah Louis Store	802	Ah Louis Store	800 Palm St. 35°16′54″N 120°39′51″W	San Luis Obispo	
Atascadero Administration Building	958	Atascadero Administration Building	6500 Palma Ave. 35°29′22″N 120°40′03″W	Atascadero	
Dallidet Adobe	720	Dallidet Adobe	1309 Toro at Pacific; 35°16′51″N 120°39′23″W	San Luis Obispo	
Estrella Adobe Church	542	Estrella Adobe Church	On Airport Rd. 35°40′50″N 120°38′27″W	Paso Robles	
Hearst San Simeon State Historical Monument	640	Hearst San Simeon State Historical Monument	Hearst San Simeon State Historical Monument; 35°41′07″N 121°10′00″W	San Simeon	
Nitt Witt Ridge	939	Nitt Witt Ridge	881 Hillcrest Dr. 35°34′00″N 121°05′43″W	Cambria	
Mission San Luis Obispo de Tolosa	325	Mission San Luis Obispo de Tolosa	Monterey between Chorro and Broad Sts. 35°16′51″N 120°39′52″W	San Luis Obispo	
Mission San Miguel Arcángel	326	Mission San Miguel Arcángel	775 Mission St. 35°44′41″N 120°41′53″W	San Miguel	
Morro Rock	821	Morro Rock	Off shore 35°22′10″N 120°52′03″W	Morro Bay	
Rancho Nipomo	1033	Rancho Nipomo	671 S. Oakglen Ave. 35°01′40″N 120°28′09″W	Nipomo	
Rios-Caledonia Adobe	936	Rios-Caledonia Adobe	700 Mission St. 35°44′17″N 120°41′56″W	San Miguel	
Santa Margarita de Cortona Asistencia	364	Santa Margarita de Cortona Asistencia	Rancho Santa Margarita Hay Barn; 35°24′02″N 120°36′44″W	Santa Margarita	Private property
Sebastian Store	726	Sebastian Store	San Simeon Rd. 35°38′36″N 121°11′29″W	San Simeon	

== See also ==
- List of California Historical Landmarks
- National Register of Historic Places listings in San Luis Obispo County, California
