= Huang An =

Huang An may refer to:

- Huang'an, former name of Hong'an County, Hubei, China
- Ah Louis (1840–1936), or Huang An, Chinese-American banker
- Huang Yi (author) (1952–2017), or Huang An, Hong Kong writer
- Huang An (singer) (born 1962), Taiwanese singer
- Huang An (character), in the novel Water Margin
