= Atascadero Printery =

- U.S. National Register of Historic Places
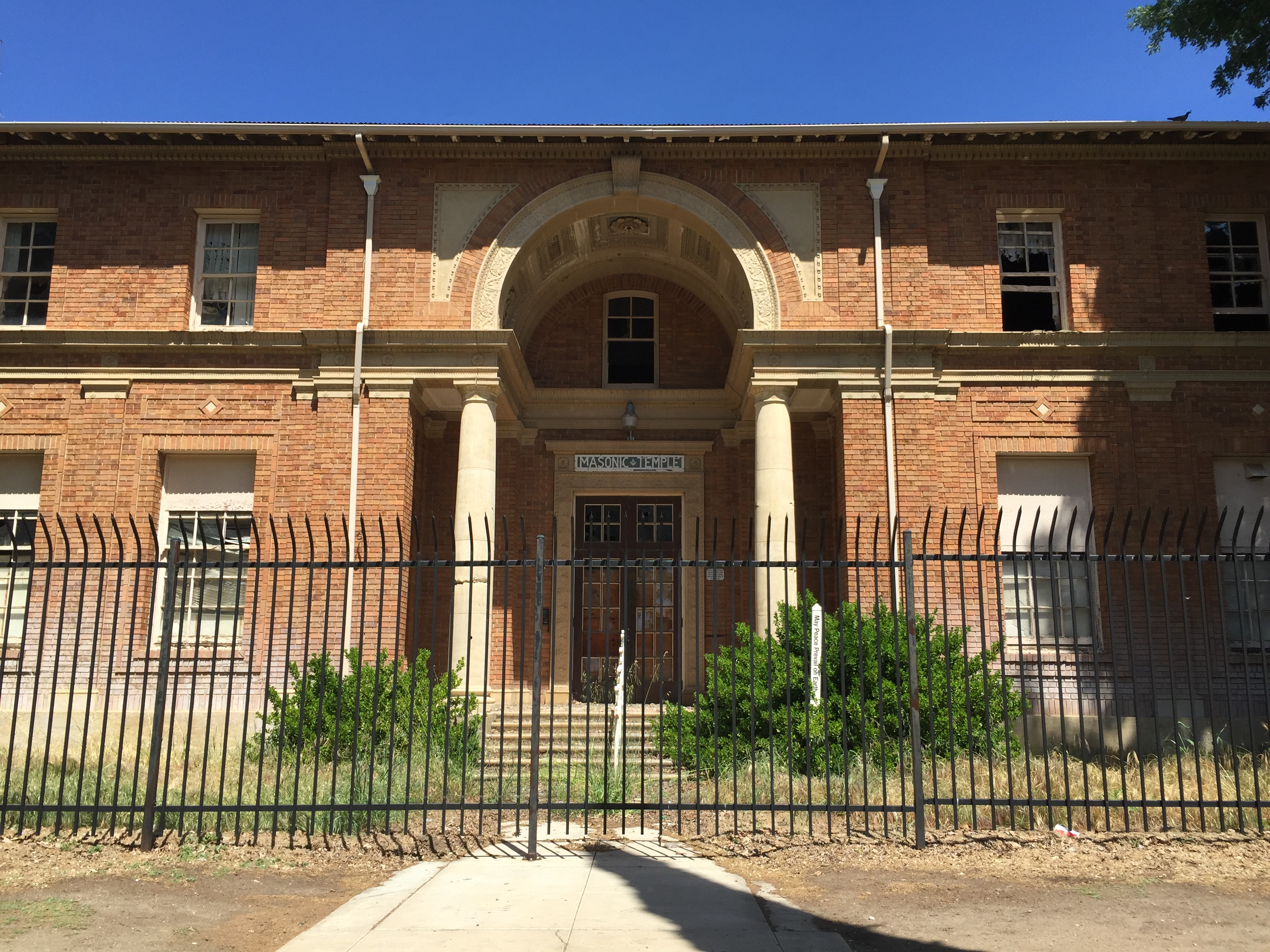

- Location within California
- Location: 6351 Olmeda Avenue; Atascadero, California
- Coordinates: 35°29′32″N 120°39′56″W
- Area: less than one acre
- Architect: Walter Danforth Bliss
- Architectural style: Italian Renaissance
- NRHP reference No.: 00001368
- Added to NRHP: January 2, 2004

The Atascadero Printery is a historic building in Atascadero, California. Built in 1915 to house a printing company, it later was home to a junior college, a prep school, a Masonic Temple, a school district office, a sheriff's substation, a live-in studio for a photographer, a karate studio, a commercial business, and community events. In 2017, the building, in a state of disrepair, was put up for public auction and purchased for $300,000 by the non-profit Atascadero Printery Foundation, which plans to restore and remodel it as a community center.

== History ==
The founder of the city, Edward Gardner Lewis (a publisher by trade), built the edifice in 1915 for the printing of his magazines and periodicals. Sources vary on the dimensions of the building, ranging from 16,000 square feet (1,500 m^{2}) to 19,354 square feet (1,800 m^{2}). In 1916, 100,000 copies of the Atascadero News were printed here. At the time, Lewis had several magazines in circulation targeted to women, as well as a national daily newspaper. For a period, the San Francisco Chronicle's Sunday circular was also printed in the building. Some sources cite that the building housed the first and largest rotogravure printing press in the United States, while others say it was at least the first in the Western United States. During the printing house era, nearly one million copies of print media were published in the printery, making it "the largest and most prolific operation in America".

The printing company closed in the late 1920s and the building housed two prep schools before being purchased by the Masonic Temple Association in the 1950s. Around 1994, the Masons donated 99% of the building to the City of Atascadero with the hopes of it being renovated into a youth center, and a later condition that if it were not, ownership would revert to the Masons. The city decided it was more cost-effective to build a community center rather than retrofit an older building to make it earthquake-safe, but wanted to hold on to the ownership of the former printery. The 2003 San Simeon Earthquake heavily damaged the building, preventing its use by the public; it was deemed in 2017 to require $9 million in restoration.

== Nonprofit foundation ownership ==
A nonprofit foundation was started in 2015 to save the building from disrepair and to gain possession of it from an LLC of local citizen Kelly Gearhart, recently convicted of fraud. Gearhart had plans to turn the building into an events center that would be used by the public at least four times a year to comply with the Masons' agreement with the city government. These plans were delayed by the legal issues Gearhart was involved in, yet prevented the city from entering the premises with Gearhart's assets being taken into bankruptcy. The building was scheduled for public auction in May 2016 with a $1 million lien and $400,000 in back taxes. In 2017, it was revealed that the purchase would require $283,000 from the newly formed nonprofit, the Atascadero Printery Foundation, and that they had raised around $40,000. The foundation then began direct negotiations with the United States Attorney's Office to see if a deal could be made to release the lien.

In 2017, the property ended up in an online public auction along with the other Gearhart properties. The Atascadero Printery Foundation won the bid at just over $300,000, with $60,000 coming from donations and the remaining monies from an anonymous donor as a loan. The group plans to remodel the grounds for a "multipurpose, community facility" including a community theater, after-school arts programs, senior citizens' club, museum, and more.

As of 2018, the foundation was seeking $8 million to complete restorations and remodels for the building to fulfill the vision of becoming a community center, and had planned many fundraising events to work toward this goal.

== Historic status ==
The building was nominated in 2000 and secured historic status on the National Register of Historic Places in 2004.

== See also ==
- National Register of Historic Places listings in San Luis Obispo County, California
