= Murder of Gon Ying Louis =

1909 murder in California

On September 30, 1909, 40-year-old Gon Ying Louis was shot and killed as she slept in the family home at Palm and Corro (or Chorro) streets, San Luis Obispo, California. Gon Ying Louis was the second wife of Ah Louis, a wealthy banker, labor contractor, farmer, and shopkeeper. The following week, police arrested 41-year-old Willie Louis, the victim's stepson and son of Ah Louis. Willie Louis was found guilty and executed at San Quentin Prison in 1912.

== Discovery of the body ==
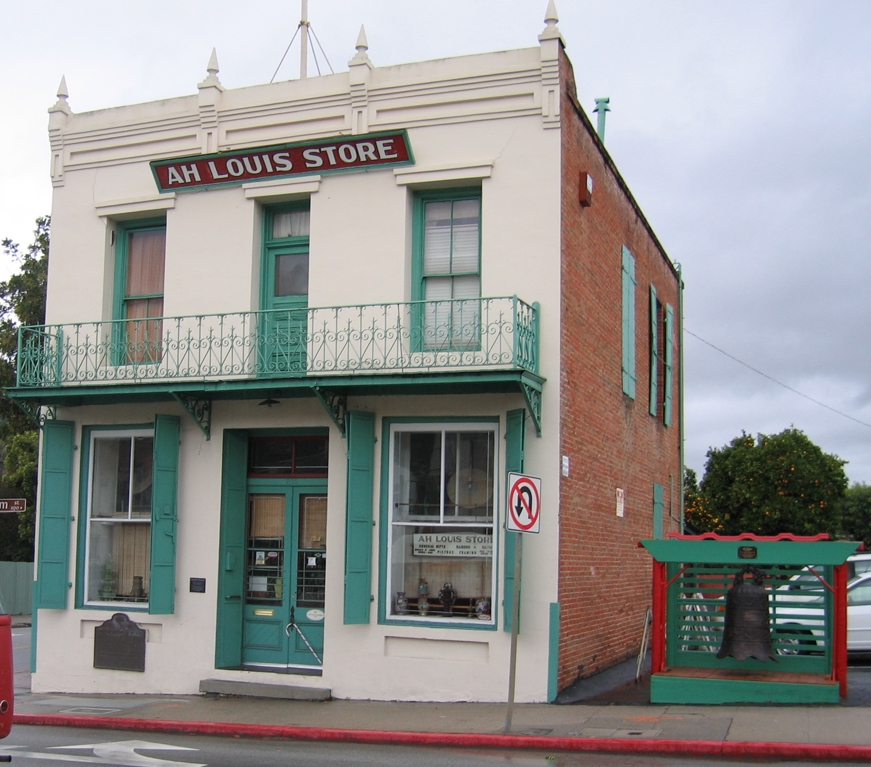
Ah Louis Store, built in 1885, photographed in 2007

The body of the dead woman, shot midway between the left cheek bone and temple, was discovered by two of her children, aged 15 months and two years, who were sleeping with her. The report of the weapon at about 6:30 a.m. awakened Laine May Louis, 12, sleeping in another room with a younger brother. She heard footsteps coming from that room, down the hallway and stairs and then heard keys jingling. She heard the youngest pair crying, then went into the death room, saw the body, and awakened sister Laine Tye, the eldest girl, 17, who was still asleep in a nearby bed. Laine May ran to the adjoining store to get help from Willie Louis, Ah Louis' 41-year-old son by his first wife. Willie then went to the house and took charge of the baby. The same morning the county coroner saw Willie Louis go to the outhouse behind the house and emerge about fifteen minutes later.

Notified, Undersheriff James Walsh went to Arroyo Grande, California, to inform Ah Louis, who had traveled by train to the L.C. Routzahn sweet-pea seed farm there about 6 a.m. Upon his return, Louis searched the house and store and found missing an iron box of his wife which contained about five thousand dollars' worth of jewelry and money.

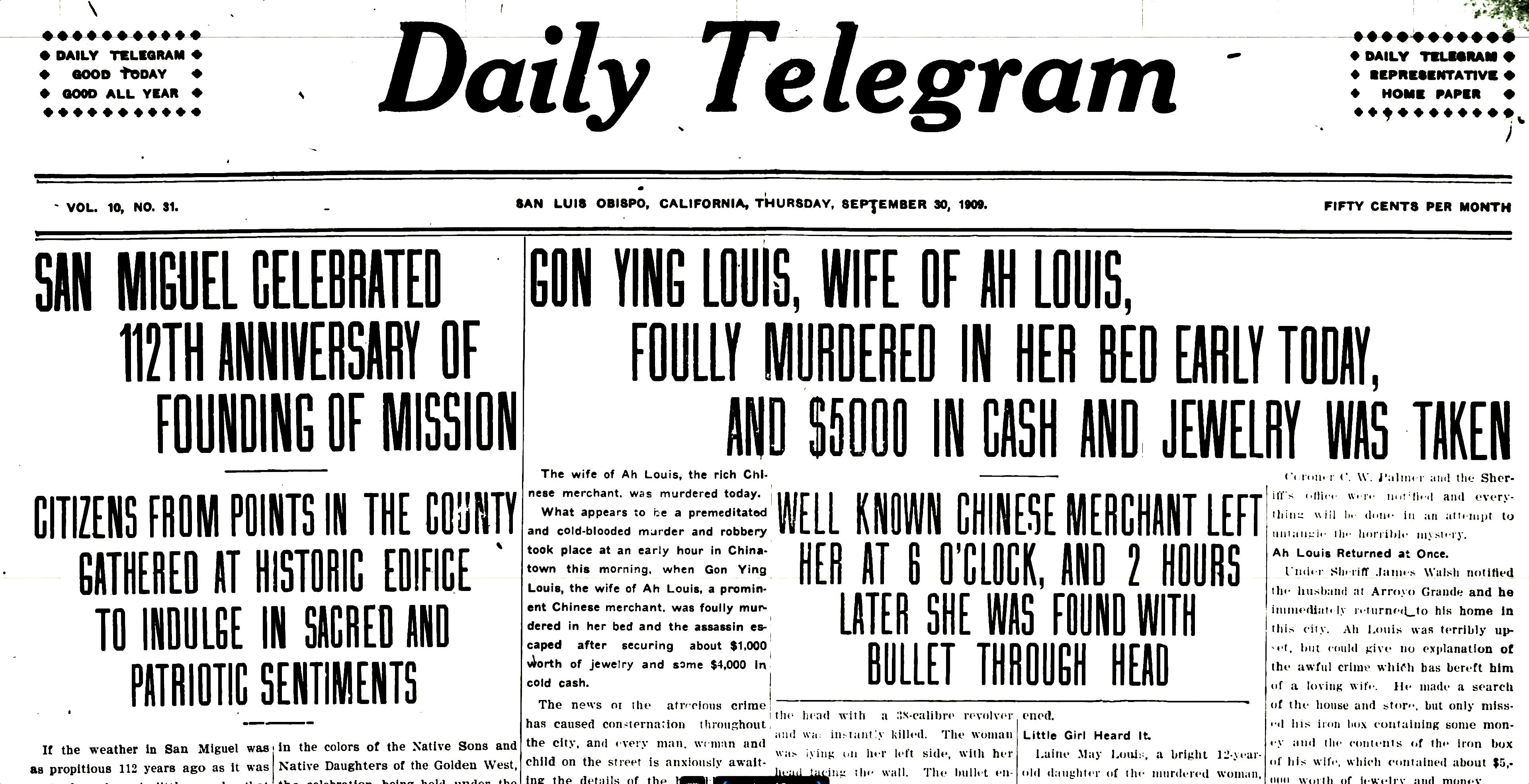
Front page of the Daily Telegram, San Luis Obispo, California, September 30, 1909, headlined "Gon >ing Louis, Wife of Ah Louis, Foully Murdered in Her Bed Early Today, and $5000 in Cash and Jewelry Was Taken."

The local newspaper, the Daily Telegram, said: "All day long there has been a crowd of morbid spectators outside the home of the murdered woman. They look upon the place with awe and are terribly shocked at the tragic sensation, which is the talk of the town."

This statement was issued in Ah Louis's name:

I do not think that any Chinaman killed my wife. I know of no one who held a grudge . . . . I do not recall telling any person of my intention to go to Arroyo Grande . . . except several persons in the store, who were my friends. No American men have been upstairs in my home, so that they could gain a knowledge of the place. They could only gain the information from some one who knew the place well. The box taken contains fine jewelry, all my wife's. She has kept it a long time, it being given to her from time to time by friends and the family. . . . I did not see anyone around the streets or building when I left in the morning to go to the depot. I cannot imagine who would want to kill my wife. She was always kind to everyone. No member of the family had had any trouble with anyone.

== Investigation and arrest ==
Two gold bracelets that had been supposedly stolen from the Louis home were found in Mrs. Louis's bed and in a small satchel. Sheriff McFadden and his men were reported shadowing a number of white men who were alleged to be "dope fiends" in "an effort to gain tangible clues."

At the inquest, the oldest daughter, Laine Tye Louis, 17, said she was awakened by the noise and noticed an odor of gunpowder but thinking it was a Chinese firecracker dropped back to sleep. Dr. C.J. McGovern said there were powder marks on the victim's face.

Ah Louis testified that during nineteen years of marriage, his wife had left their home only twice, once to visit "the Tomasini home" and once to go to the dentist. She knew "but little" of the English language.

Laine Tye stumbled through her testimony in English until her sister, Laine May, 12, was sworn in as an interpreter.

Ah Louis's oldest child, Willie, 41, testified he never had a pistol and was too afraid to carry one. He said he had a wife and seven children living in China, where they were married 23 years previous. He said he last saw his stepmother when he went upstairs about midnight to get a cup of coffee.

Another son, fifteen-year-old Young Louis, recalled that he heard a shot, then footsteps from what sounded like a heavy leather shoe, though his mother wore soft Chinese slippers.

Sheriff McFadden went to Ah Louis and explained he needed a Chinese person to work on the case. Louis recommended his nephew, Wong Bock Yue, a San Francisco newspaper editor, who came to San Luis Obispo to assist. Willie Louis was arrested on Grant Avenue, San Francisco, on October 5, 1909, to be taken to San Luis Obispo and tried for murder. San Luis Obispo County Sheriff McFadden said that Willie was in love with his stepsister but was opposed in his suit by the murdered woman, who was killed not only because of her opposition but also so she could not inherit Louis' property, which McFadden said was worth around eighty thousand dollars.

A throng of people greeted the train when it pulled into the San Luis Obispo station on the afternoon of October 6. A hack, or horse-drawn taxi, was hired "to get the alleged murderer to jail without any demonstration" on their part. A reporter wrote that Willie Louis was "scared to death" and "seemed anxious to get behind the iron doors of the jail to a place of safety."

With Willie in jail, investigators searched the garden at the rear of the Louis house and dug up the jewelry, deeds, and papers that had been taken from the Louis home. The next day, city workers plumbed the depths of a cesspool at the rear of the house and pulled up the revolver used in the killing, with its markings filed off, and other items taken from the home.

== Confession ==
On Friday, October 8, in front of a roomful of witnesses, Willie Louis made a "free and voluntary confession" that he killed his stepmother after contemplating murder for a long time because she was quarrelsome and was always taunting him with the fact that all the property belonged to his father and that Willie would have to pay for everything he took from the store." He had no attorney. He said that he had wanted the other family members to go back to China and leave the store to him and that his stepmother had always been nagging him that he should return to his wife and other family in China.

"Don't you feel sorry for the little children," he was asked. "Yes, but I can take care of them. They are better off without their mother."

On October 9, Ah Louis told a reporter that he "completely washed his hands" of his eldest son.

== Legal steps ==
At the arraignment on October 19, Willie Louis was asked if he had any counsel, and he replied he would like to talk with his father. He was permitted to use the telephone, but Ah Louis was "out on his ranch." Willie Louis was later defended by Thomas Rhodes of San Luis Obispo.

== Sentence and execution ==
Willie Louis's trial was speedy, resulting in his conviction, and on September 29, 1910, he was sentenced to death. A series of continuances followed.

As the convicted man entered the death chamber on December 6, 1912, T.H. Christensen of San Francisco shouted: "I protest against this hanging in the name of Jesus Christ." Guards hustled Christensen from the room, and Louis went to his death on the gallows "without a whimper," a United Press dispatch reported from San Quentin Prison.

== Exterior links ==
- Vicinity of the killing on a map
