= Dallidet Adobe =

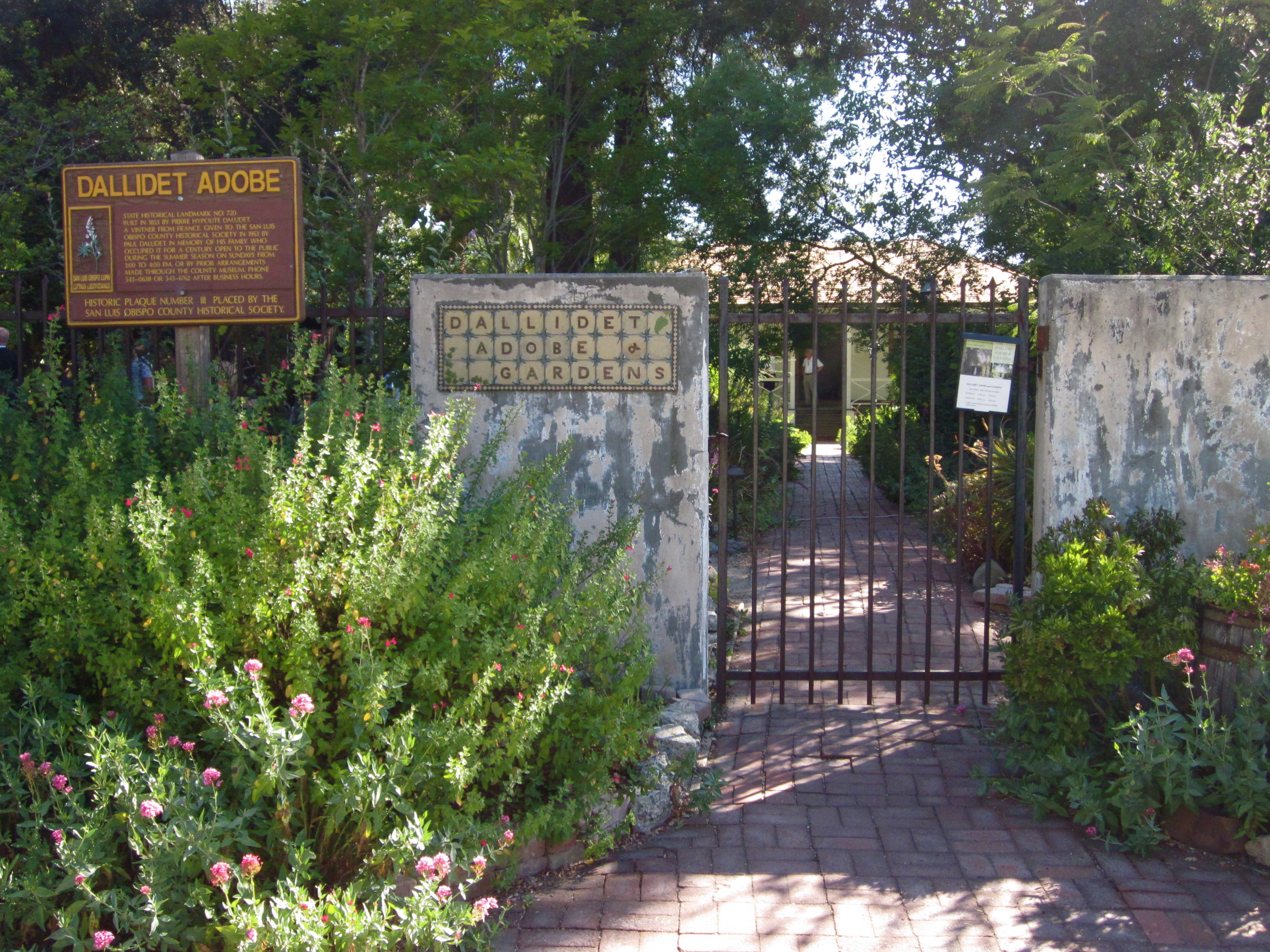
- Dallidet Adobe and Gardens

- Location within California Location within the United States
- 35°16′51″N 120°39′23″W
- Type: Adobe structure and gardens
- Location: 1185 Pacific Street, San Luis Obispo, California

History
- Built: 1856

California Historical Landmark
- Reference no.: 720

The Dallidet Adobe and Gardens is a California Historical Landmark (#720) in San Luis Obispo, California. The site was originally the property of Pierre Hypolite Dallidet, who came to San Francisco in search of gold in 1850.

His son, Paul Dallidet, transferred it to the San Luis Obispo County Historical Society in 1953, in his family's memory.

== See also ==
- City of San Luis Obispo Historic Resources
