= Tribune-Republic Building =

- U.S. National Register of Historic Places
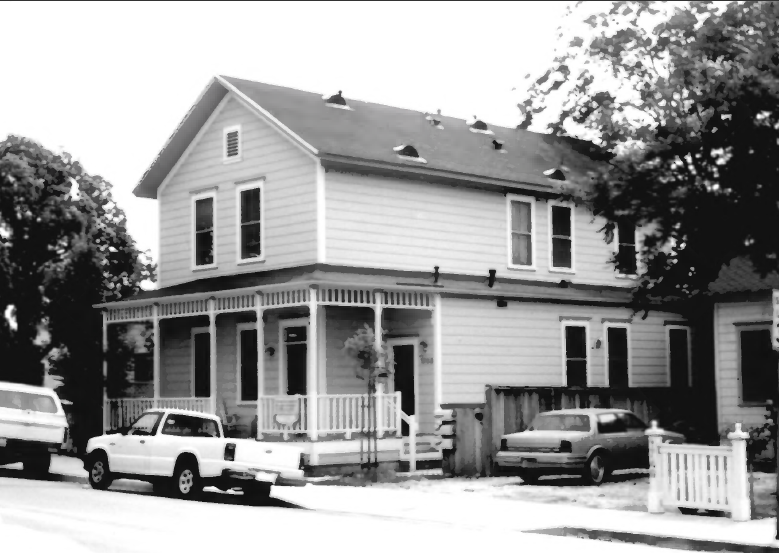
- Tribune-Republic Building in 1992

- Location within California Location within the United States
- Location: 1763 Santa Barbara St., San Luis Obispo, California
- Coordinates: 35°16′33″N 120°39′21″W
- Area: 0.1 acres (0.040 ha)
- Built: 1890
- Architectural style: Late Victorian
- NRHP reference No.: 93000548
- Added to NRHP: June 24, 1993

The Tribune-Republic Building (also known as the Laughery House Annex or as the Shaw House) is a historic building located at 1763 Santa Barbara Street in San Luis Obispo, California.

== Description and history ==
It was built in 1873 and was moved in 1905. It is significant as the only surviving newspaper printing office in San Luis Obispo from its era, during 1873 to 1890, when four newspapers competed there.

It was listed on the National Register of Historic Places on June 24, 1993.

== See also ==
- City of San Luis Obispo Historic Resources
