= San Luis Obispo Carnegie Library =

- U.S. National Register of Historic Places
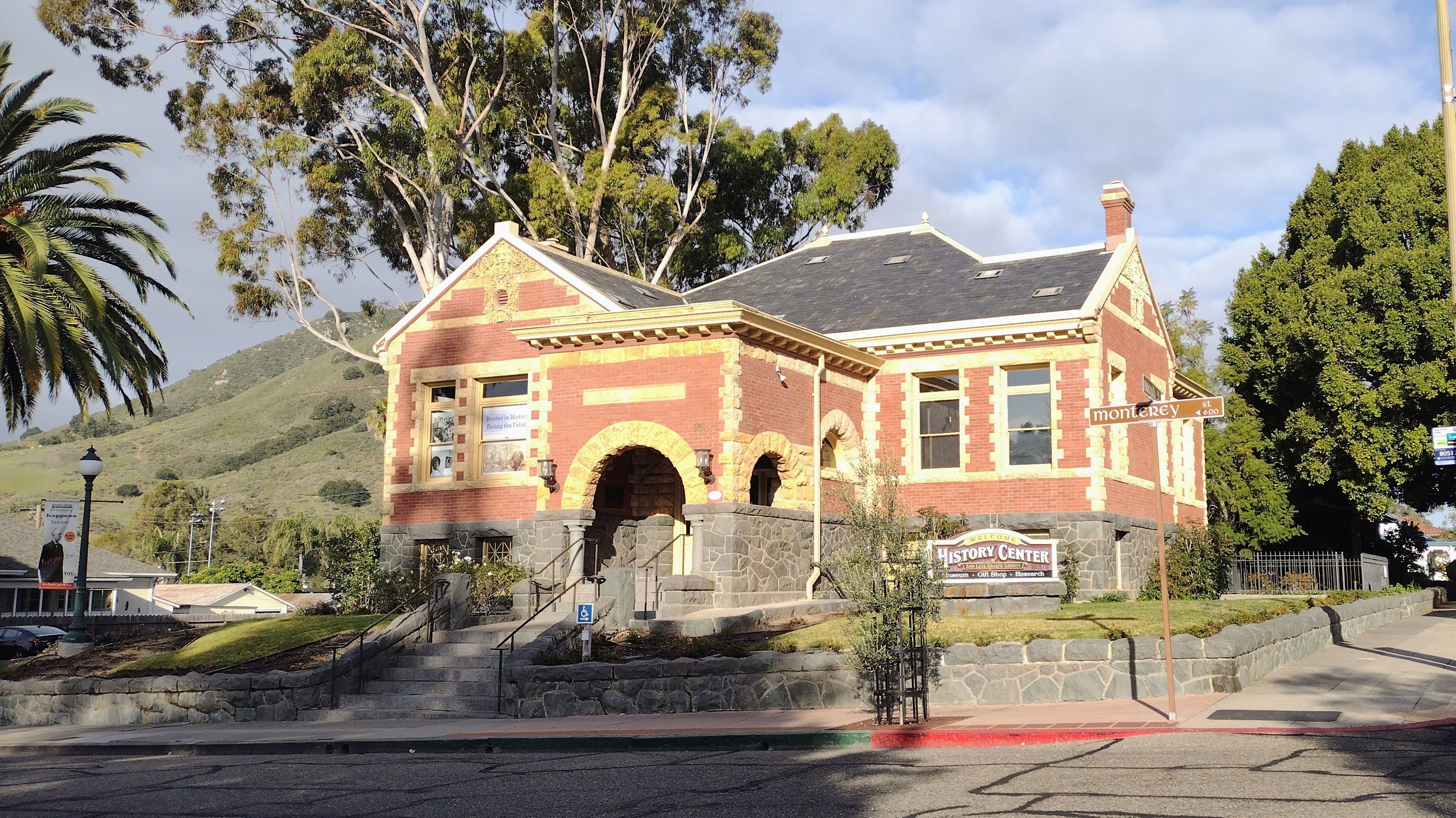

- Location within California Location within the United States
- Location: 696 Monterey St., San Luis Obispo, California
- Coordinates: 35°16′49″N 120°39′50″W
- Area: less than one acre
- Built: 1905
- Architect: Weeks, William H.
- Architectural style: Romanesque
- MPS: California Carnegie Libraries MPS
- NRHP reference No.: 95000357
- Added to NRHP: March 30, 1995

The San Luis Obispo Carnegie Library is a Carnegie library located at 696 Monterey St. in San Luis Obispo, California. The library building was funded by the Carnegie foundation in 1903 and built in 1905; it housed the city's subscription library program, which had operated since 1894. William H. Weeks, who designed 21 Carnegie libraries in California, designed the San Luis Obispo library in the Richardsonian Romanesque style. The library's design includes a tall hipped roof with two gabled wings, decorations including gargoyles in the gable ends, and an entrance portico with multiple round arches. The building is mainly faced in red brick with yellow sandstone trim, but the basement is faced in dark gray granite.

The library operated until 1955 and became a county historical museum the following year.

The library building was added to the National Register of Historic Places on March 30, 1995.

== History Center of San Luis Obispo County ==
The library is now home to the History Center of San Luis Obispo County, formerly known as the San Luis Obispo County Historical Museum. The museum features changing exhibits on local history and culture and a research room.

== See also ==
- City of San Luis Obispo Historic Resources
