= Atascadero Administration Building =

- U.S. National Register of Historic Places
- California Historical Landmark
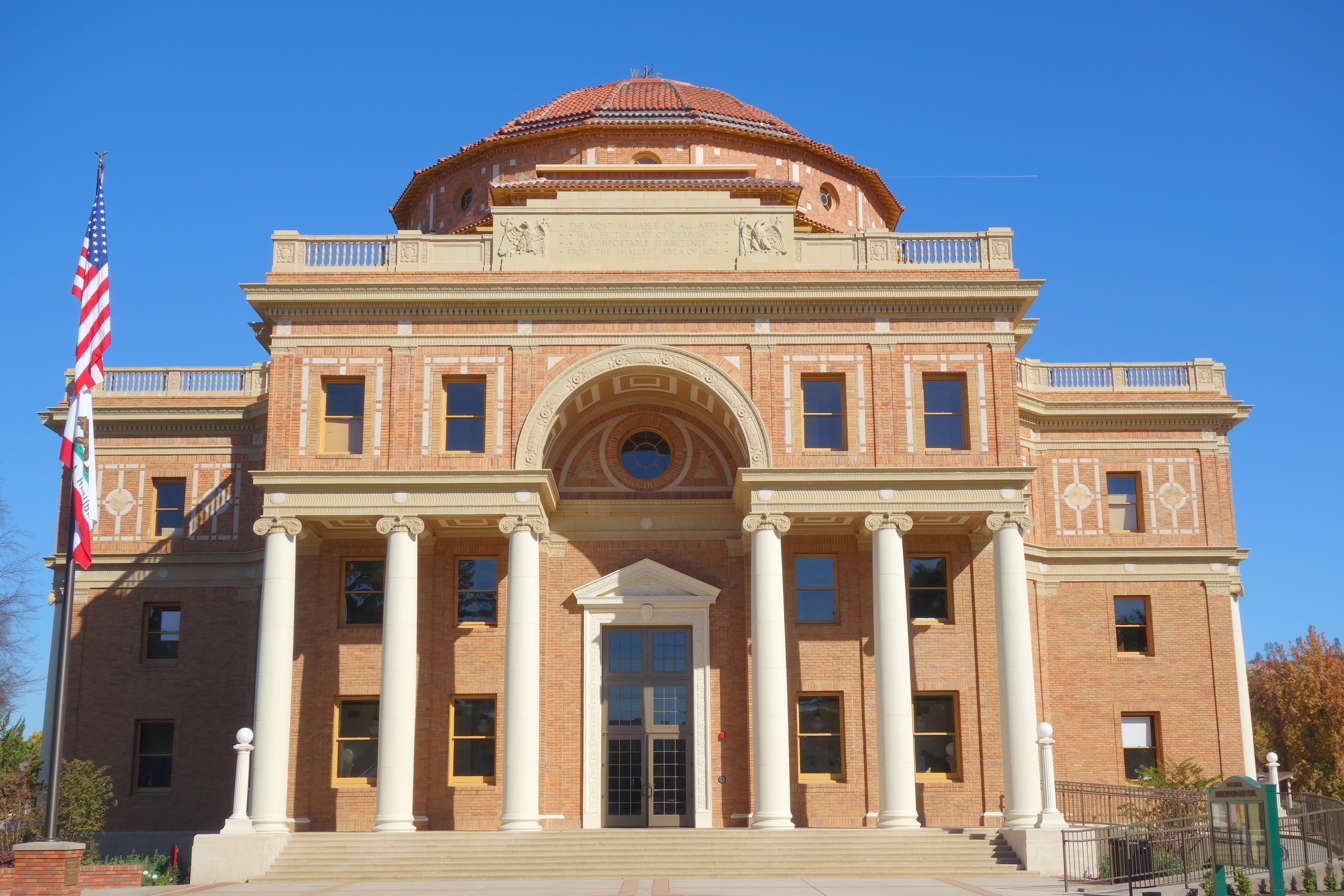

- Location within California Location within the United States
- Location: 6500 Palma Ave., Atascadero, California
- Coordinates: 35°29′22″N 120°40′03″W
- Built: 1918
- Architect: Walter Danforth Bliss
- Architectural style: Italian Renaissance
- Restored: 2006
- Restored by: Pfeiffer Partners Architects
- NRHP reference No.: 77000336
- CHISL No.: 958
- Designated NRHP: November 17, 1977

The Atascadero Administration Building is a historic facility in Atascadero, California. W.D. Bliss designed the building. Now serving as the city hall of Atascadero, this Romanesque gem of Central California was built starting in 1914, of light rosy yellow brick fired from local clays.

== History of use ==
The building is now a California Historical Landmark, #958. It is also on the National Register of Historic Places.

== Earthquake damage and restoration ==
The building was damaged in the 2003 San Simeon Earthquake and was closed for 10 years during a period of significant restoration. The city reopened the building in August 2013.
