= Myron Angel House =

Historic house in California, United States

- U.S. National Register of Historic Places
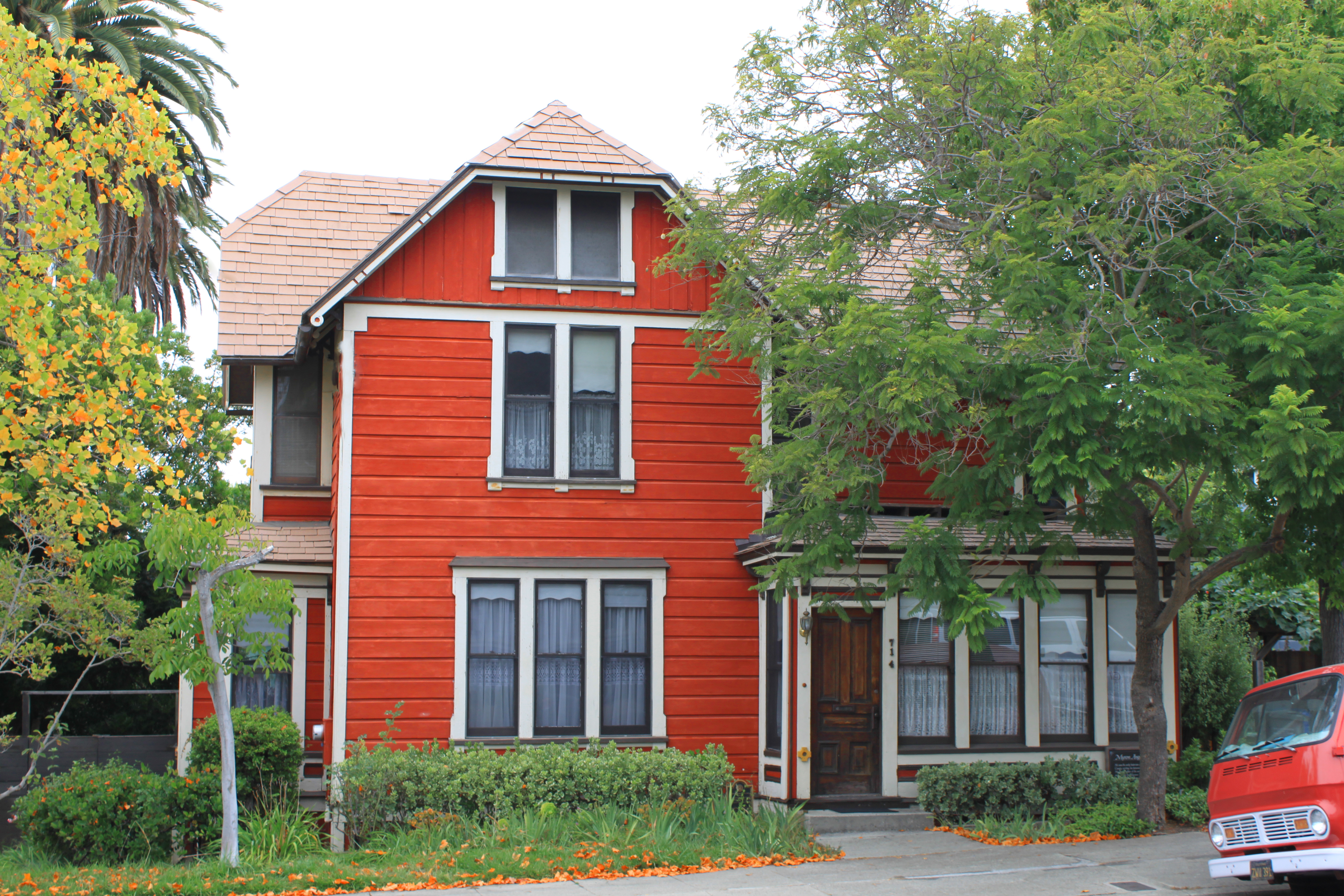

- Location within California Location within the United States
- Location: 714 Buchon St., San Luis Obispo, California
- Coordinates: 35°16′33″N 120°39′39″W
- Area: 0.2 acres (0.081 ha)
- Architectural style: Vernacular
- NRHP reference No.: 82000988
- Added to NRHP: November 22, 1982; 43 years ago

The Myron Angel House is a historic house located at 714 Buchon St. in San Luis Obispo, California. Built circa 1880, the house has a vernacular design which does not follow a particular architectural style. The two-story wood-frame house has redwood siding, a shingled gable roof, and some Eastlake details in the window surrounds and gable ends. The house was once the home of Myron Angel, the main figure in the establishment of California Polytechnic State University. Angel, who lived in the house from 1889 to his 1911 death, proposed and lobbied for the creation of a polytechnic school in California; it was mainly due to his campaign that Cal Poly was founded in San Luis Obispo. In addition to his educational activism, Angel was also an influential journalist and historian.

The house was added to the National Register of Historic Places on November 22, 1982.

== See also ==
- City of San Luis Obispo Historic Resources
