= Arroyo Grande IOOF Hall =

- U.S. National Register of Historic Places
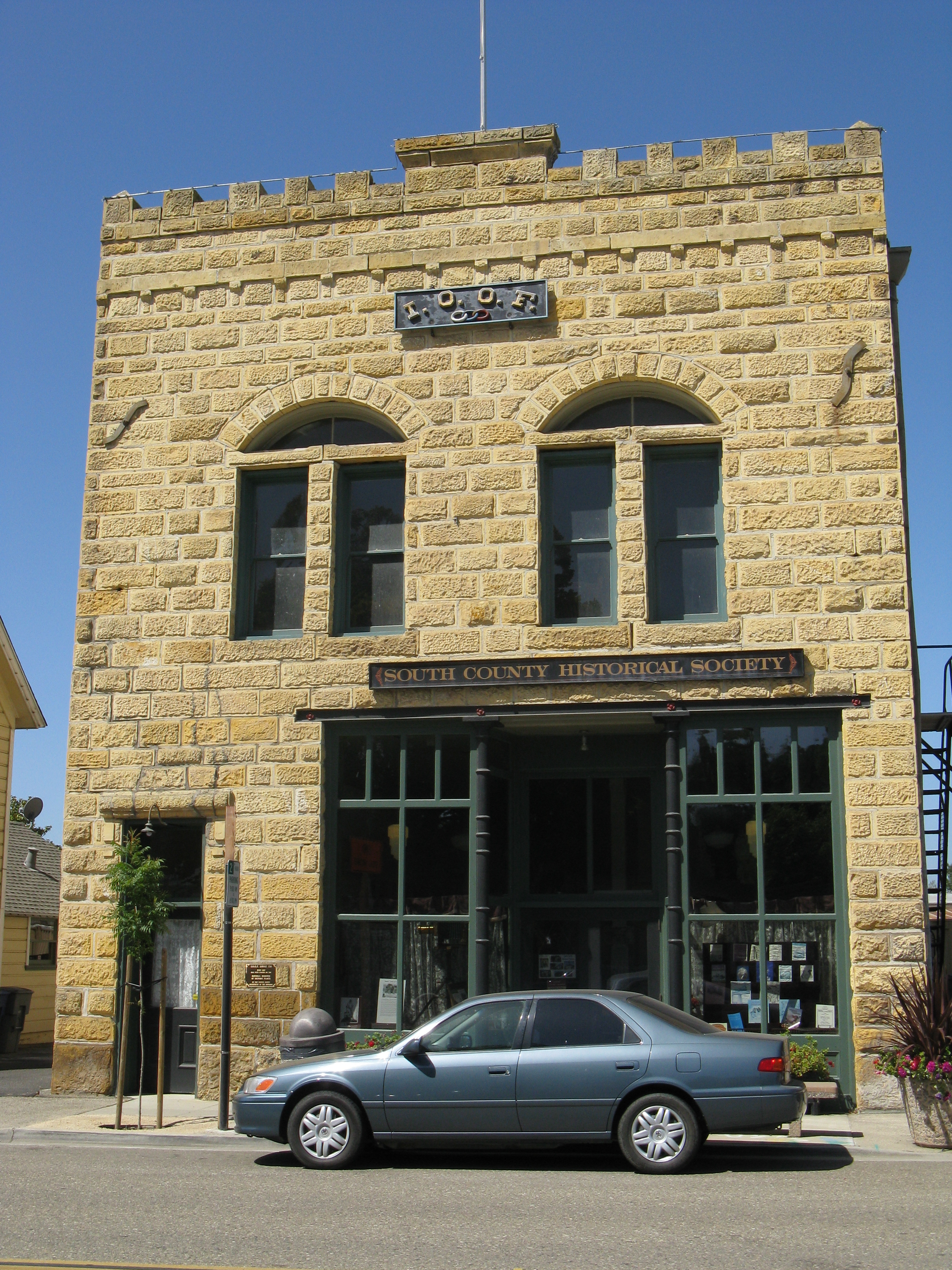

- Location within California Location within the United States
- Location: 128 Bridge St., Arroyo Grande, California
- Coordinates: 35°7′20″N 120°34′38″W
- Area: less than one acre
- Built: 1902
- Architect: Parsons, A.F.; Lockwood & Stewart
- Architectural style: Romanesque
- NRHP reference No.: 91000344
- Added to NRHP: March 22, 1991

The Arroyo Grande IOOF Hall is a building in Arroyo Grande, California, that was built in 1902. The building housed the town's chapter of the Independent Order of Odd Fellows, which was established in 1887. The order planned a two-story building with a storefront on the first floor; the building is one of the tallest in downtown Arroyo Grande. The sandstone building was designed in the Romanesque style and features segmentally arched windows and doors and a crenellated parapet with a large merlon in the center. In 1985, the Odd Fellows lodge disbanded, and the building is now owned by the South County Historical Society. It was listed on the National Register of Historic Places in 1991.
