= Archeological Site 4 SLO 834 =

Archaeological site in California, United States

- U.S. National Register of Historic Places
- Nearest city: Atascadero, California
- Area: 3 acres (1.2 ha)
- NRHP reference No.: 82004618
- Added to NRHP: February 25, 1982

Archeological Site 4 SLO 834, also known as CA-SLO-834, is a prehistoric archaeological site in Atascadero, California. The site, which is on the west bank of the Salinas River, was discovered by Charles Dills in 1977. Archaeologist Robert Gibson conducted excavations at the site in 1978 and found hammerstones, hand axes, a hearth, pestles, projectile points, scrapers, and stone debris. As a result of this excavation, Gibson determined that the site had been inhabited between 1,500 and 2,000 years prior. To protect the site from surrounding development, over 30,000 cubic yards (23,000 m^{3}) of fill soil was added to the site in 1982; more soil has been added since.
