= Myron Angel =

American historian and journalist

Myron W. Angel (1827-1911) was a historian and journalist who led efforts to found California Polytechnic State University in San Luis Obispo, California.

== Early life ==
Myron Angel was born in Oneonta, New York and raised in Milford, New York. He was admitted to the U.S. Military Academy at West Point on July 1, 1846. At the examinations that were held in June 1848, Angel was found deficient in both mathematics and French. At the urging of his brother Eugene and due to his poor grades, Myron Angel resigned from the Academy on June 30, 1848.

== California ==
The brothers left New York to follow their uncle, David Fairchild, and his sons to California during the Gold Rush of 1849. Eugene Angel, an attorney and surveyor, was involved in the First Battle of Pyramid Lake, and was one of the many casualties.

After working as a miner and in various other manual-labor jobs, Myron Angel found work as a journalist. He worked at newspapers in Placerville, California, in Austin, Nevada (the Reese River Reveille, with his Fairchild cousins), and in Oakland, California before ultimately settling in San Luis Obispo, where he worked for two local newspapers. In addition to his journalistic work, Angel also published and edited regional histories, including History of Nevada, and histories of Placer, San Luis Obispo, and Tulare counties in California.

Angel moved to San Luis Obispo in 1883, the same year he published his history of the county. He became a booster for the city and convinced the Southern Pacific Railroad to build a line there.

After visiting his native Oneonta in 1893 and seeing its campus of the New York State Normal School, Angel decided to campaign for a similar school in San Luis Obispo. As California already had normal schools in Chico and San Jose, with another planned in San Diego, State Senator Sylvester C. Smith suggested that Angel focus his efforts on starting a polytechnic school instead. Due to his previous experience in and lack of preparation for vocational work, Angel endorsed the need for such a school. Smith introduced a bill to found a polytechnic school in 1897, but the legislation was vetoed by Governor James Budd. Angel continued to lobby for the school, and he and Smith were joined in their efforts by San Luis Obispo state Assemblyman Warren N. John and San Luis Obispo Tribune editor Benjamin Brooks. Henry Gage was elected governor in 1898; he was more sympathetic to Angel's efforts than was his predecessor, and when John and Smith again passed a bill through the state legislature in 1901, Gage signed it into law. The university was established on January 1 of the following year.

Myron Angel died in 1911 and was survived by his wife Caroline F. Angel.

His house in San Luis Obispo is listed on the National Register of Historic Places; its historic status primarily comes from Angel's prominent role in the history of the city.

== Bibliography ==
- History of Nevada, edited by Myron Angel, Thompson & West, Oakland, CA (1881)
- The History of Placer County, edited by Myron Angel, Thompson & West, Oakland CA (1882)
- History of San Luis Obispo County, edited by Myron Angel, Thompson & West, Oakland, CA (1883)
- La Piedra Pintada, The Painted Rock of California: A Legend, Myron Angel, Grafton Publishing, Los Angeles, CA (1910)
- History of the California Polytechnic School at San Luis Obispo, California (1910)
