= Pacific Coast Railway Company Grain Warehouse =

Historic warehouse in San Luis Obispo, California, US

- U.S. National Register of Historic Places
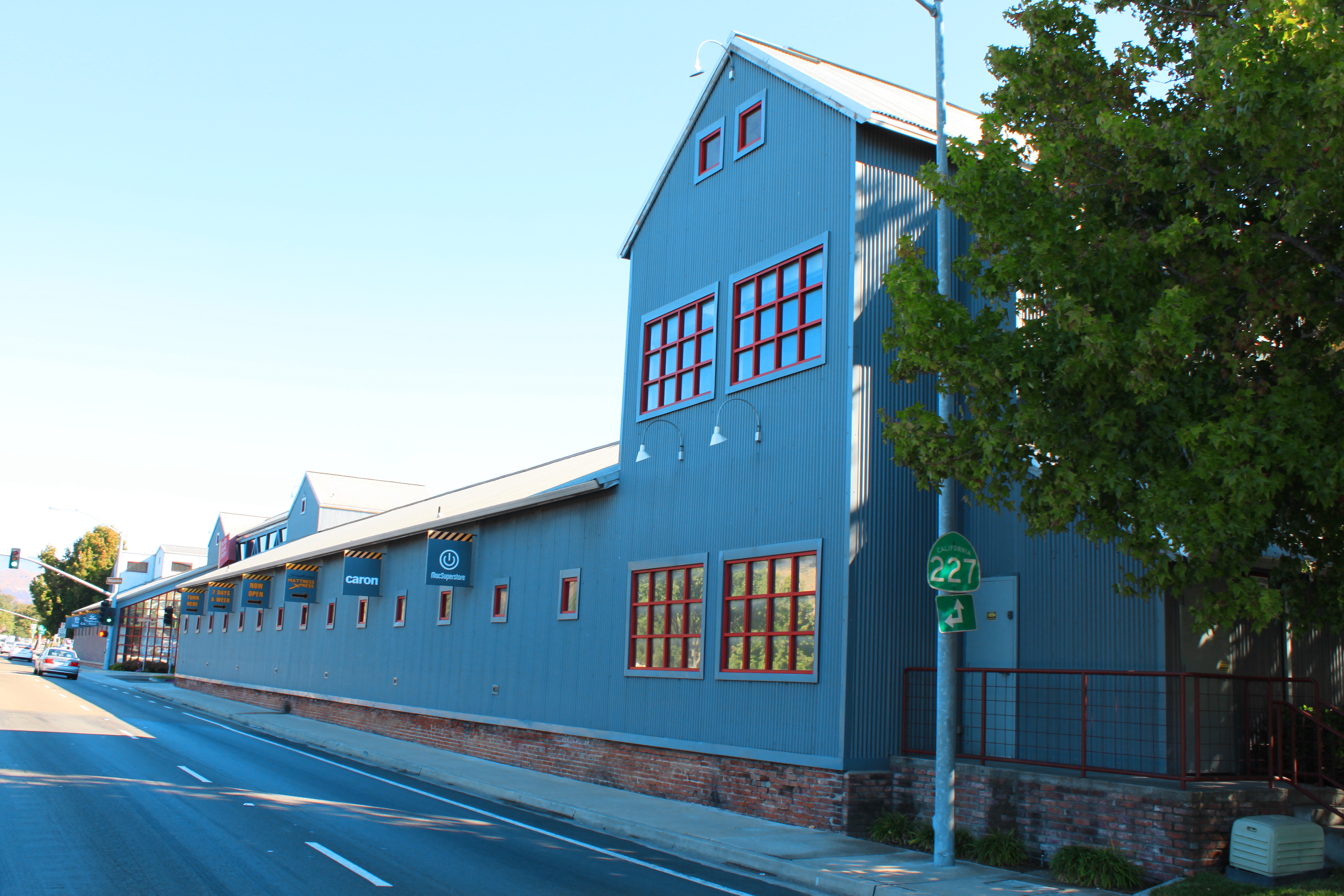

- Location within California Location within the United States
- Location: 65 Higuera St., San Luis Obispo, California
- Coordinates: 35°16′05″N 120°40′13″W
- Area: 0.5 acres (0.20 ha)
- NRHP reference No.: 88000921
- Added to NRHP: June 23, 1988

The Pacific Coast Railway Company Grain Warehouse is a warehouse building located at 65 Higuera St. in San Luis Obispo, California. The warehouse is the only surviving building from the Pacific Coast Railway's headquarters as well as the only extant grain storage building in San Luis Obispo. The date of the building's construction is uncertain; city records state that it was built in 1885, but it may have been rebuilt in 1892–93 after a fire. The wood frame building has corrugated iron paneling on its walls and roof, a typical design for contemporary storage buildings. The Pacific Coast Railway used the warehouse from its construction until the railway folded in 1942; the warehouse held grain grown in the region, which was at the time a major producer of grain and beans.

The warehouse was added to the National Register of Historic Places on June 23, 1988.

== See also ==
- City of San Luis Obispo Historic Resources
