= William Shipsey House =

Historic house in California, United States

- U.S. National Register of Historic Places
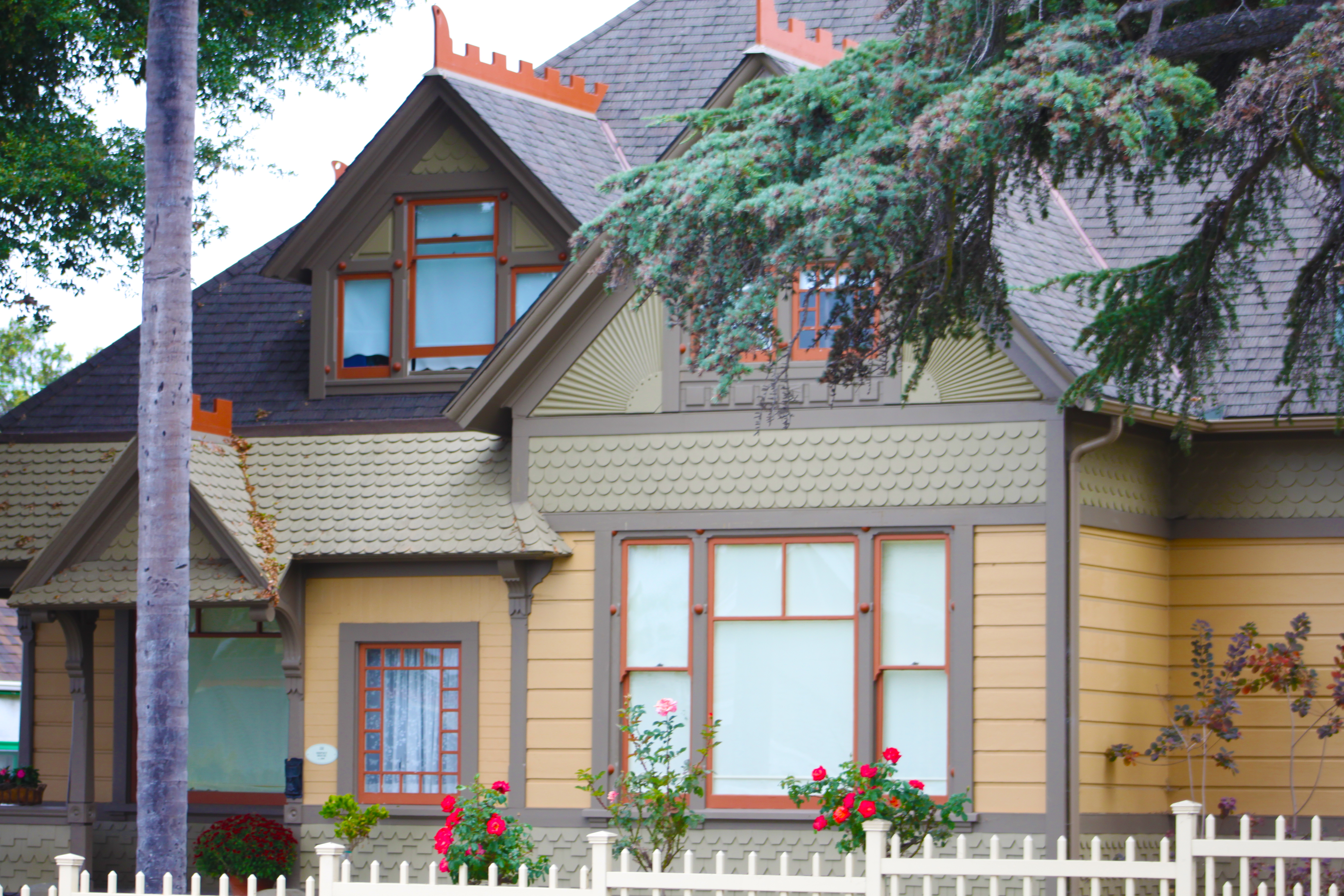

- Location within California Location within the United States
- Location: 1266 Mill St, San Luis Obispo, California
- Coordinates: 35°17′9″N 120°38′57″W
- Area: less than one acre
- Architect: Laird, Hilamon Spencer; et al.
- Architectural style: Queen Anne, Stick/Eastlake
- NRHP reference No.: 10000115
- Added to NRHP: March 31, 2010

The William Shipsey House, located at 1266 Mill St. in San Luis Obispo, California, is a historic house that is listed on the National Register of Historic Places. It was designed by architect Hilamon Spencer Laird and includes Queen Anne and Stick/Eastlake elements. It was built in 1894 for William Shipsey. It is significant historically for its association with Shipsey and for it serving as "an excellent example of local design and craftsmanship."

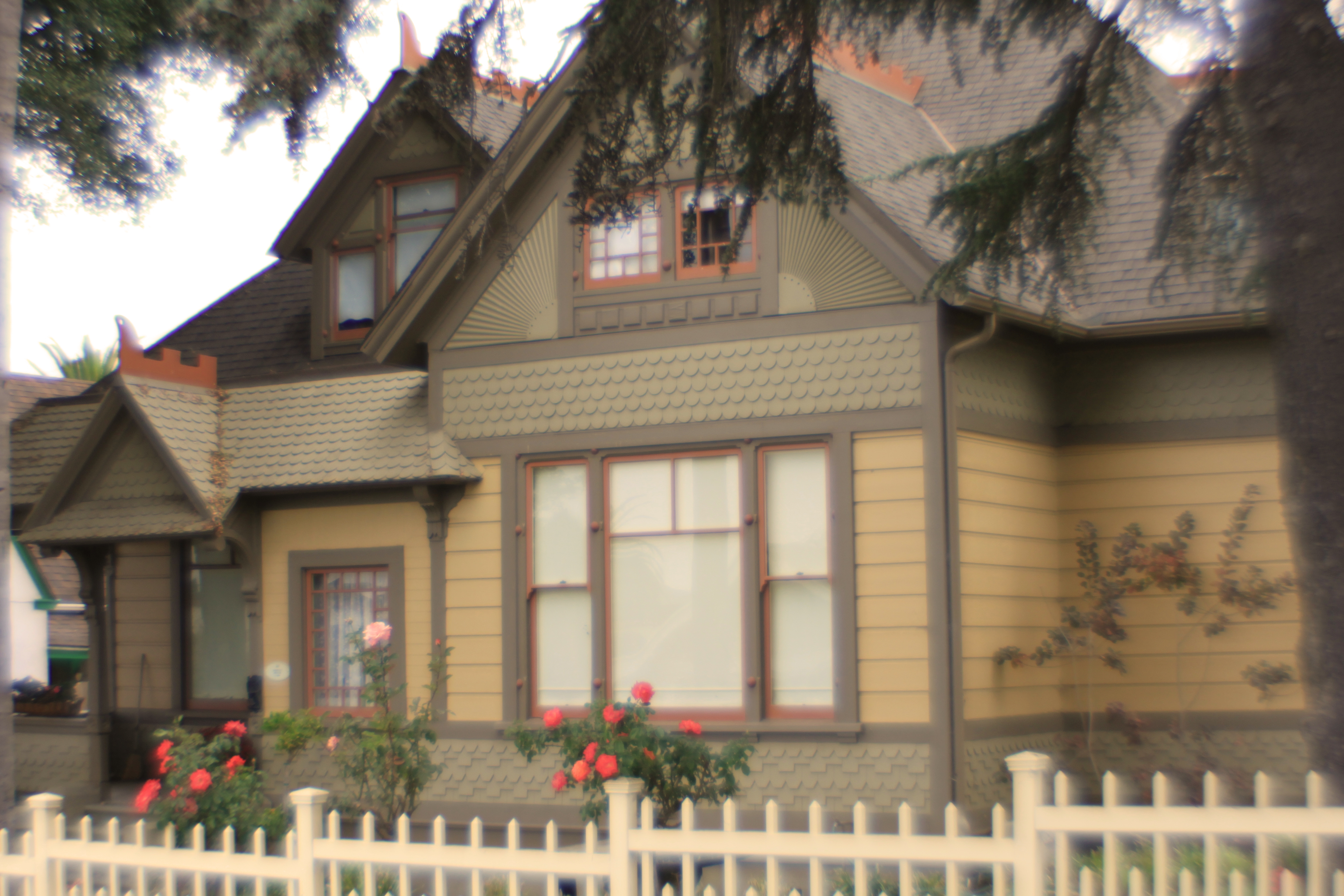

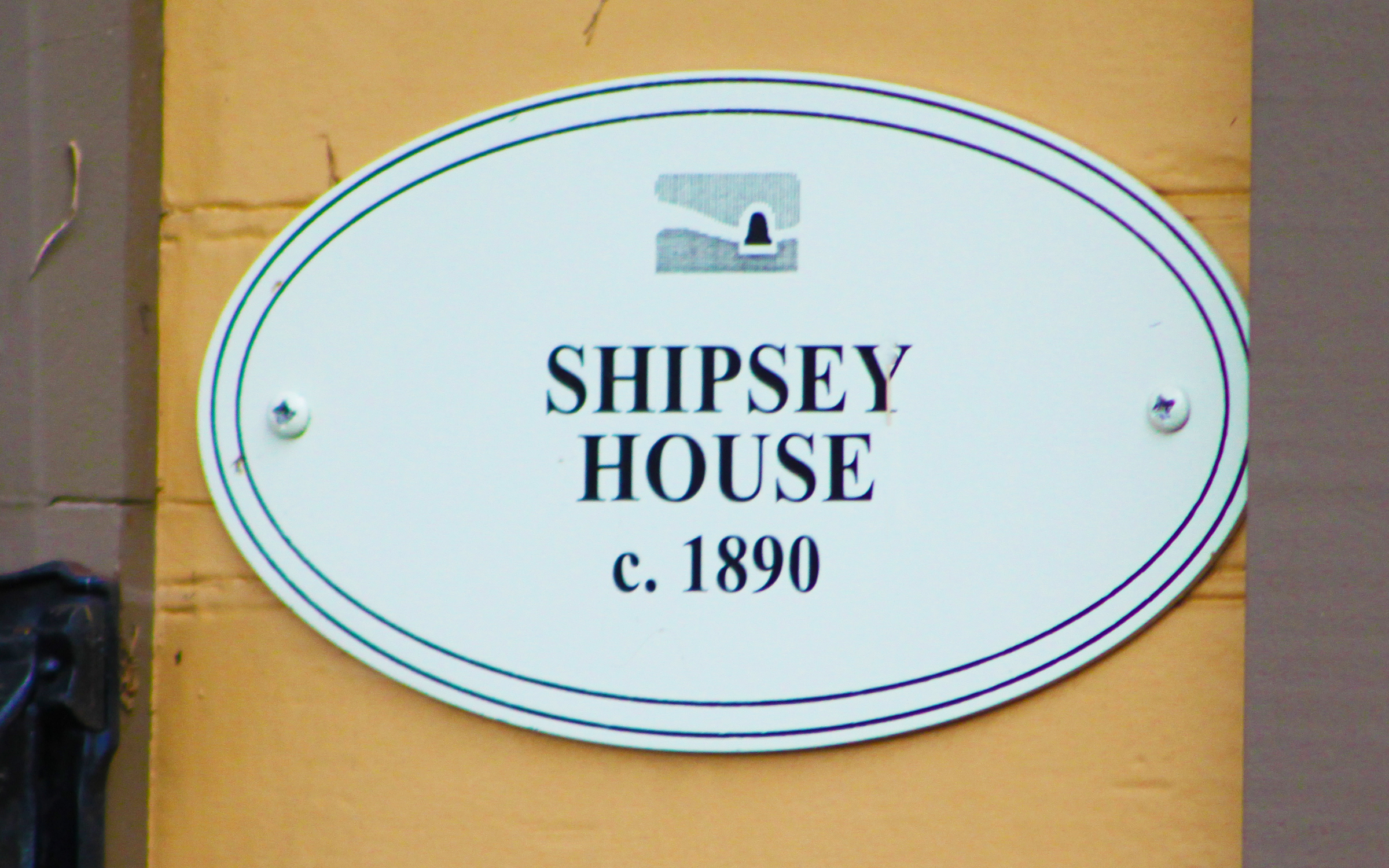

== See also ==
- City of San Luis Obispo Historic Resources
