= Robert Jack House =

Historic house in California, United States

- U.S. National Register of Historic Places
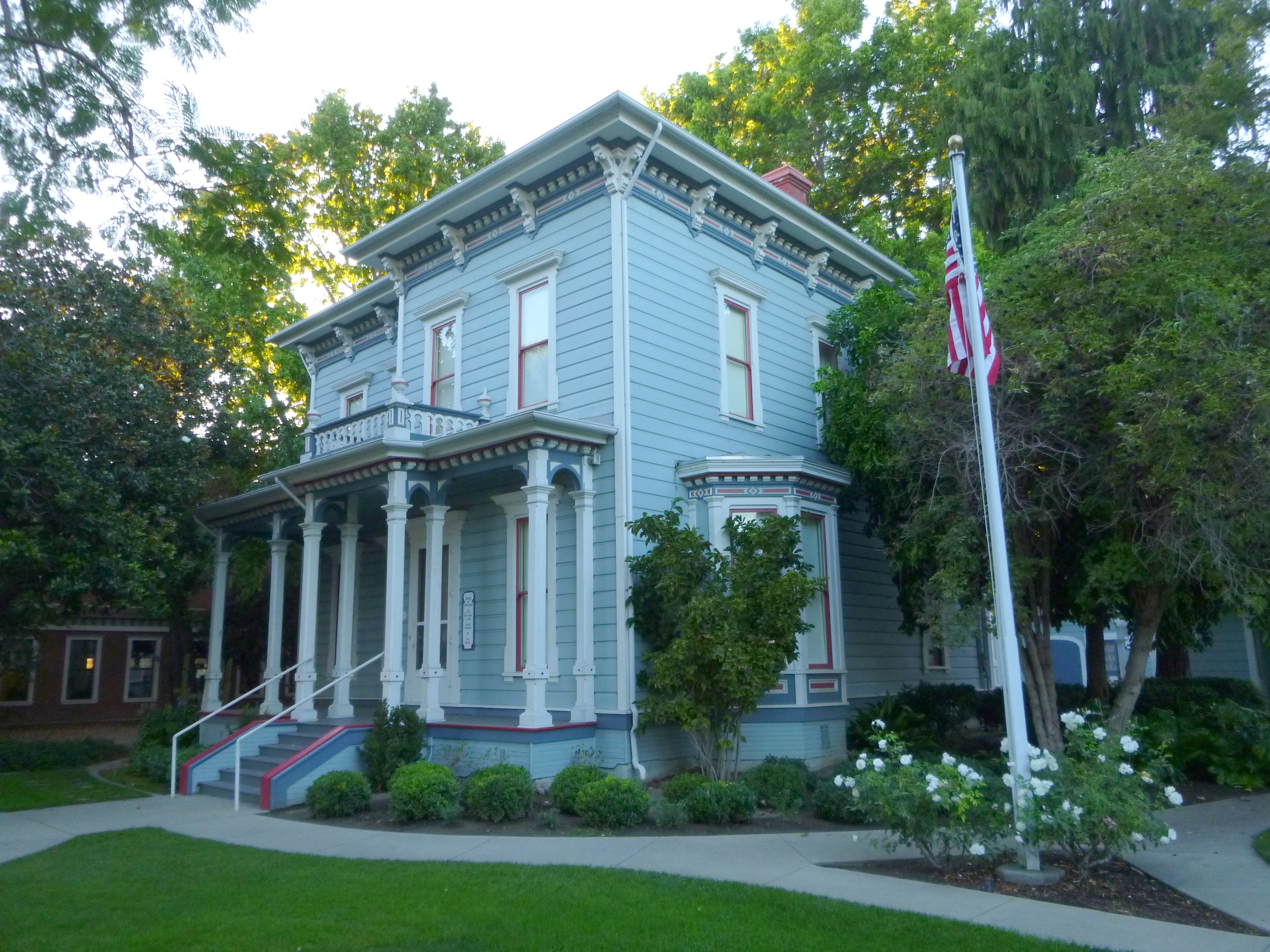

- Location within California Location within the United States
- Location: 536 Marsh St., San Luis Obispo, California
- Coordinates: 35°16′38″N 120°39′53″W
- Area: 0.8 acres (0.32 ha)
- Built by: Evans, William
- Architectural style: Italianate
- NRHP reference No.: 92000312
- Added to NRHP: April 13, 1992

The Robert Jack House, at 536 Marsh St. in San Luis Obispo, California, is a two-story Italianate-style historic house. It was listed on the National Register of Historic Places in 1992. The listing included two contributing buildings.

The Jack House is now owned by the City of San Luis Obispo. Volunteer docents offer guided tours on Sundays from April through November, and the house is also open for holiday celebrations and special events.

The house was built by, and was a home of, Robert Edgar Jack (died 1916), who was "a prominent banker and land developer and wool grower in Central California." The house was deemed significant for its association with Jack. He lived there from 1882 until his death. Jack, as a banker and a leading citizen, was quite involved in promoting the development of railroad through the central coast, and also benefited economically from the railroad. The house is also perhaps of significance architecturally as a good example of Italianate architecture.

== See also ==
- City of San Luis Obispo Historic Resources
