= Estrella Adobe Church =

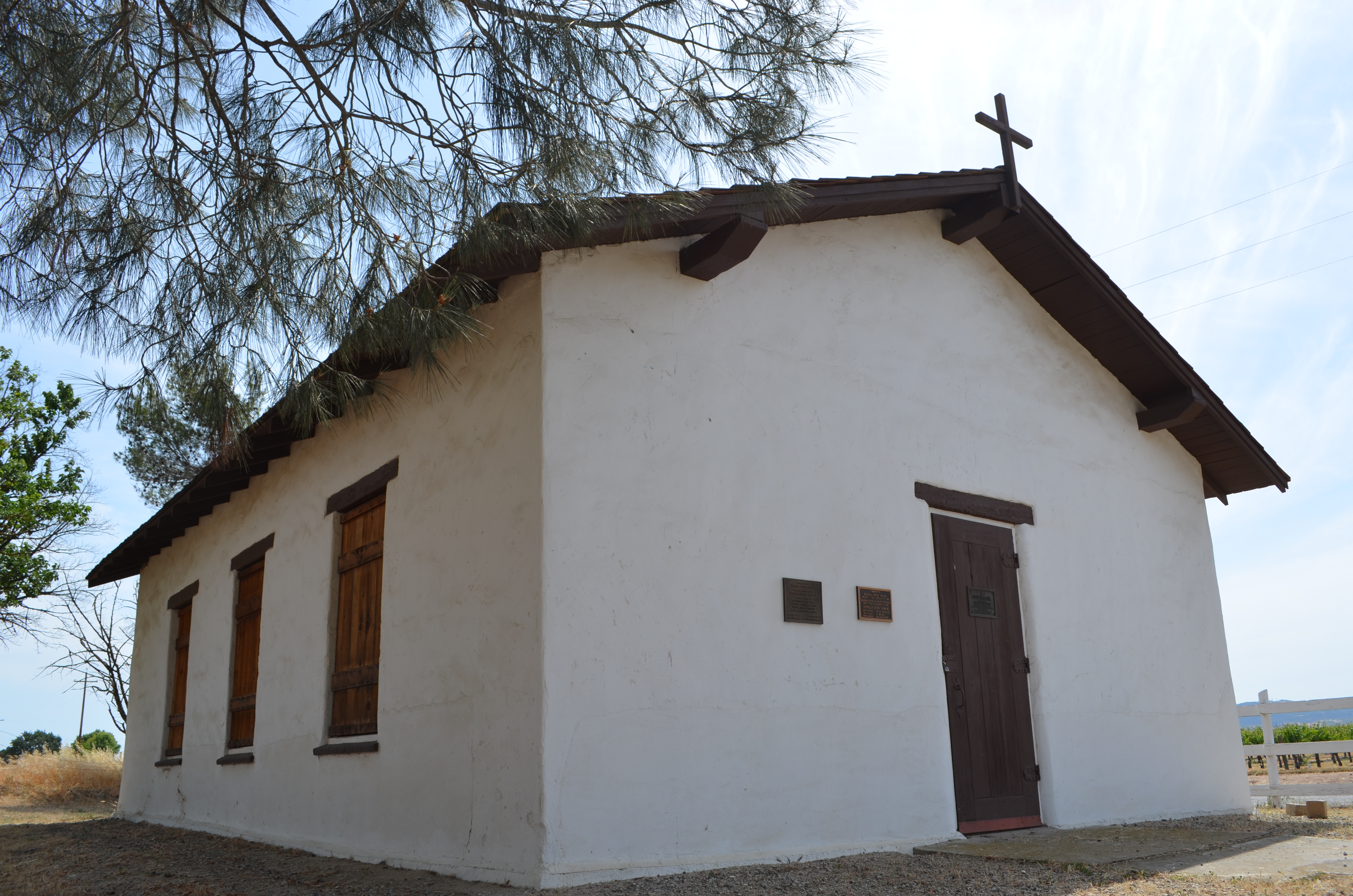
- Estrella Adobe Church facing southwest

- Location within California Location within the United States
- 35°40′50″N 120°38′27″W
- Type: Adobe church
- Location: 5660 Airport Road, Paso Robles, California

History
- Built: 1879

California Historical Landmark
- Reference no.: 542

The Estrella Adobe Church, an adobe dwelling built in 1879, is a California Historical Landmark (#542). It fell into disuse and was in ruins when, according to the marker, the Paso Robles Women's Club History and Landmarks Committee restored the structure beginning in 1950 and completing in 1952.

On the property, there is an inactive cemetery with the earliest burials that appear to be 1878 and the latest burial is 1959. The Pleasant Valley Estrella Cemetery District operates and maintains the cemetery.

== Landmark ==
Estrella Adobe Church was designated as a California Historical Landmark in 1981.
