= San Luis Obispo Octagon Barn =

Place in California listed on National Register of Historic Places

Coordinates: 35.236927°N 120.679602°W

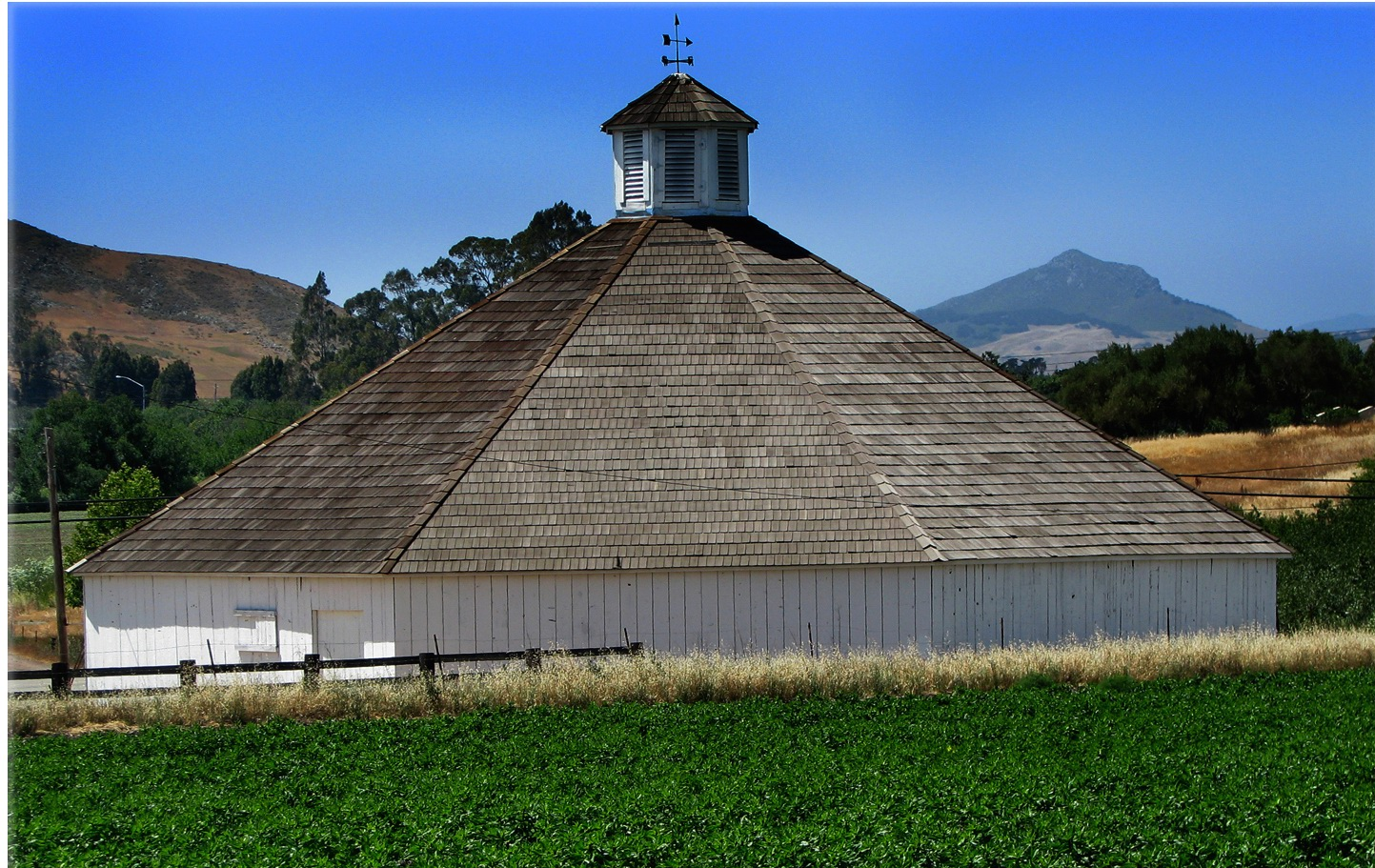
Restored barn, late 2008

The Pereira Octagon Barn of San Luis Obispo is a historic structure located on the southern outskirts of San Luis Obispo, California. It was built in 1906 by Henri LaFranchi, a young Italian-Swiss immigrant and the owner of a small meat market, John Damaso, an Azorean immigrant and a carpenter by trade, and a third, unknown man identified only as a “milk farmer.” Since there were no other octagonal barns in the area, the builders may have worked from patterns of octagonal construction in farm journals or catalogs.

The first user of the barn was Italian-Swiss immigrant Antonio Stornetta, who leased the barn for his Santa Fe Dairy operation until 1917. Joaquin and Josephine Pereira, with Josephine's sister Eleanor and her husband Manuel Garcia, purchased the property in 1920 and made it part of an adjoining dairy operation in the Los Osos Valley. They were typical of many first- and second-generation Portuguese Americans, who followed in the footsteps of the Italian-Swiss in the dairy business. The Pereira-Garcia operation was called the Home Dairy. It had a pasteurization and bottling plant at 719 Higuera Street and made daily milk deliveries throughout the city of San Luis Obispo. Dairy operations continued into the 1950s when small-scale dairy operations were no longer economically viable. The barn then supported a small-scale cattle operation and some row-crop farming. The property was purchased in 1994 by John and Howard Hayashi, who three years later entered into a lease agreement with the Land Conservancy of San Luis Obispo County. The Land Conservancy has restored the barn, which will be used as a community gathering place.

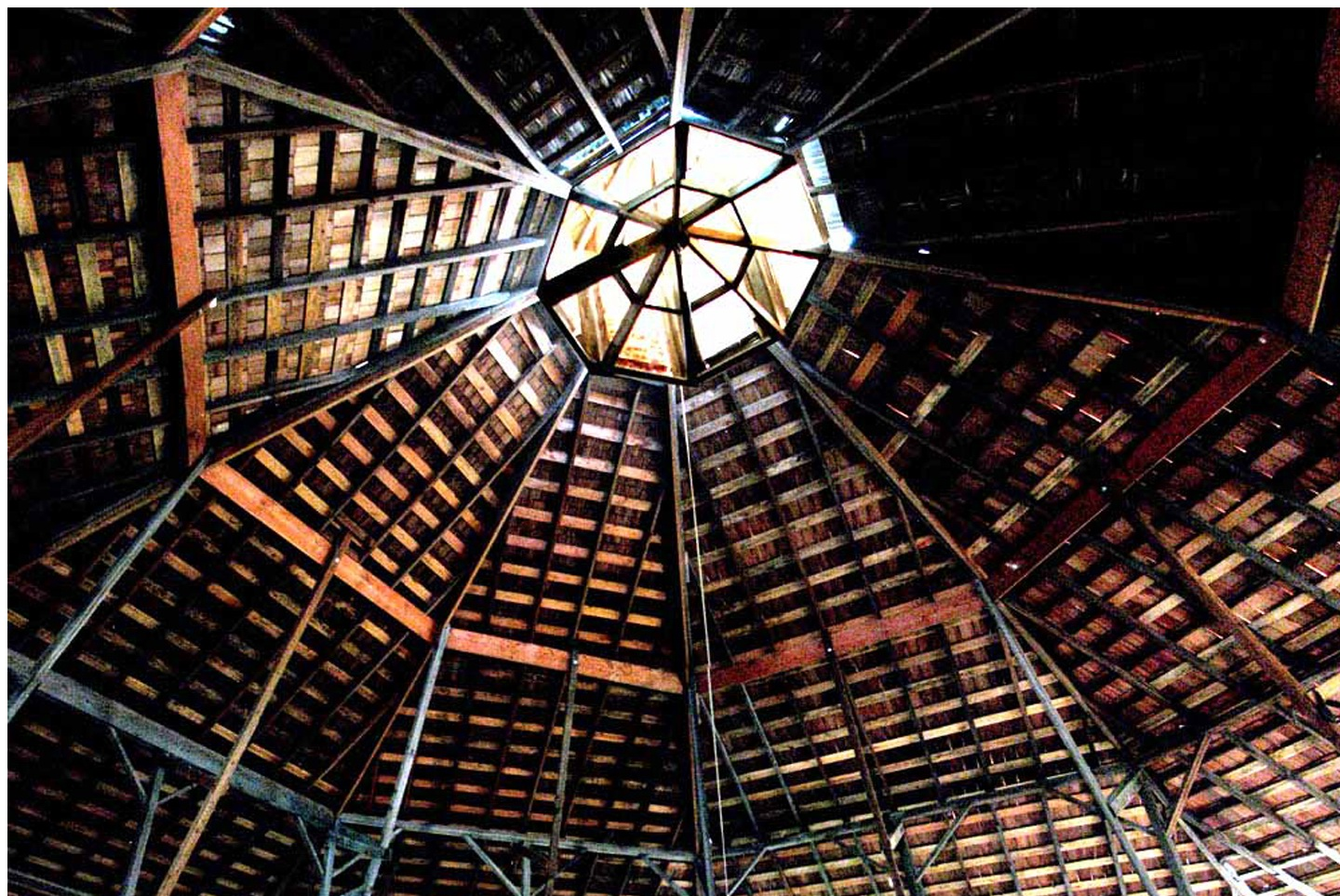
View of the cupola from inside the barn

The Octagon Barn (5000 sq. ft.) is made with redwood timbers and has a new, custom shingled replacement redwood roof. There is a cupola on top reaching over 40 feet above the floor. The barn is accompanied by a 2,000-square-foot Milking Parlor (1938) and a Calf Barn.

== Significance ==
The Barn is important for four reasons:

- History and Culture. Agriculture is central to the San Luis Obispo County economy today. 107 years ago, when the barn was built, dairy farming was an important element in that economy, particularly in the Edna, Chorro Creek, and Los Osos Valley areas.
- Architecture. The octagonal shape of the barn enhanced its function in dairy agriculture. The polygonal shape approached that of a circle, which reduced the amount of building material. The Barn is recognized as part of the “gateway” into San Luis Obispo from the south. It is visible from US 101.
- Recreation and Education. The Octagon Barn is the official start of the Bob Jones City-to-Sea (Class 1) Bicycle Trail between the City of San Luis Obispo and Avila Beach. Lessons in history, agriculture, renewable energy, and conservation can be delivered at the Barn Center.
- National Historic Registration. In December 2013, The Pereira Octagon Barn has been listed on the National Register of Historic Places. The local landmark on South Higuera is one of only two octagonal barns left in California and uniquely represents the region's agricultural roots. The National Register is administered by the National Park Service, and is the country's official list of United States historic sites considered “worthy of preservation.” Inclusion in the Registry “honors the property by recognizing its importance to its community, State, or the Nation.”

== Restoration ==
Restoration of the barn began in 1997 when the barn was near collapse. Structural improvements have been completed. Current activity concentrates on bringing the Barn into the community as a gathering space.

The Octagon Barn Center will be a community gathering place to promote local history, agriculture, recreation, and sustainability. It will host events such as fundraisers, dances, movies, music performances, weddings, family reunions, and festival-connected activities. A windmill, a small restored wetland, photovoltaic power, parking for over 100 cars and landscaping with hundreds of trees are planned.

The San Luis Obispo Octagon Barn Center is located at 4400 Octagon Way, San Luis Obispo, CA 93401.
