= Ah Louis =

- 黃安
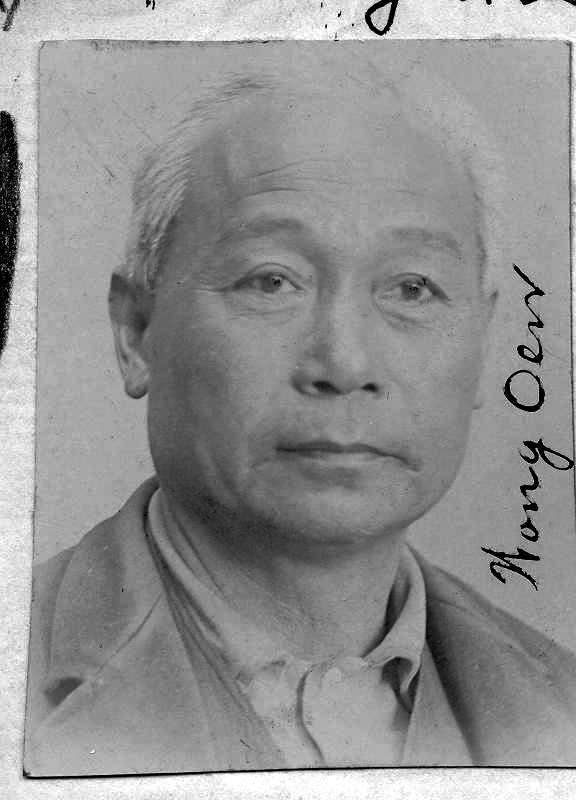
- Ah Louis in 1894
- Born: Wong On; March 25, 1840; Taishan, Guangdong, Qing China
- Died: December 16, 1936 (aged 96); San Luis Obispo, California, U.S.
- Other names: Ah Luis; Wong Ock-fon (黃德煥)
- Occupations: Banker, labor contractor, farmer, and shopkeeper
- Spouse: Eng Gon Ying (m. 1889; died 1909)
- Children: 9

Ah Louis
- Chinese: 黃安
Transcriptions
Standard Mandarin
- Hanyu Pinyin: Huáng Ān
Yue: Cantonese
- Yale Romanization: wong4 on1
- Jyutping: wong4 ngon1
other Yue
- Taishanese: vong3 on1

On Wong (March 25, 1840 – December 16, 1936), more commonly known as Ah Louis, was a Chinese American banker, labor contractor, farmer, and shopkeeper in San Luis Obispo, California, during the late 19th and early 20th century. He was remembered as “the unofficial mayor of Chinatown" for his community work.

Ah Louis was a central figure in the development of the Central Coast of California, serving as an organizer of Chinese laborers during the construction of the Pacific Coast Railway's Avila—Port Harford spur and the tunnels through Cuesta Grade over the Santa Lucia Range. His Ah Louis Store building is on the National Register of Historic Places.

== History ==
Wong was born in Lung On (Chinese: 龍安), a village in Taishan County, Guangdong Province. According to Wong, his family traced their genealogy back to 607 BC, making him part of the 138th generation since then. He traveled to the United States between 1854 and 1861. Historian Dan Krieger attributes Wong's reason for emigration to a local famine brought on by sweet potato crop failure in the late 1850s while the National Park Service gives his motivation as wanting to escape the Taiping Rebellion. Wong was first recorded in San Francisco, California in 1860, as one of many Chinese immigrant miners during the California gold rush.

Unsuccessful at mining, he became a laborer working in San Francisco, Eureka, California, and Corvallis, Oregon. In 1867 or 1868, Wong moved further south, partially because the warmer climate, reportedly to help his chronic asthma he developed due to San Francisco fog, working as a cook at hotels and private residences for some time. After the stagecoach he traveled in broke down in Gilroy, he made his way to San Miguel by foot within one week. By 1870, Wong settled in San Luis Obispo, California, at the time home to a large Chinatown community of around 100. Wong was first employed as a cook at a French hotel before he began working with John Harford of Schwartz, Harford & Co. lumber company. Harford referred to Wong as "Ah Luis", ("Ah" as a term of familiarity and "Luis" after his residence in San Luis Obispo), to distinguish him from other Chinese workers with the same common surname, which eventually became "Ah Louis".

As the population in San Luis Obispo grew to the thousands, the Chinese community also increased by several hundreds. Louis began to organize work crews to help construct the Pacific Coast Railroad, delivering 160 Chinese Americans from San Francisco by schooner. In 1877, Ah Louis was awarded two large road construction contracts, including a road from Paso Robles, California, to Cambria, California (now the westernmost portion of State Route 46) and the first stages of a road connecting San Luis Obispo to Paso Robles (now referred to as Cuesta Grade, a portion of which is still driveable and is labeled off the freeway as "Old Stagecoach Road" and a portion of U.S. Route 101). In 1884, Louis received the contract to construct the four Cuesta Grade tunnels for the Southern Pacific Railroad's coast route, requiring the provision of 2,000 laborers and taking ten years to complete.

Between 1905 and 1922, Louis managed six ranches, two of which were in San Luis Obispo neighborhoods (Chorro and Venable Street), as well as in Oceano, Oso Flaco Lake, Edna, and Santa Fe. The farms mainly produced flower and vegetable seeds, while also being used to rear race horses.

=== Store ===
Ah Louis Store
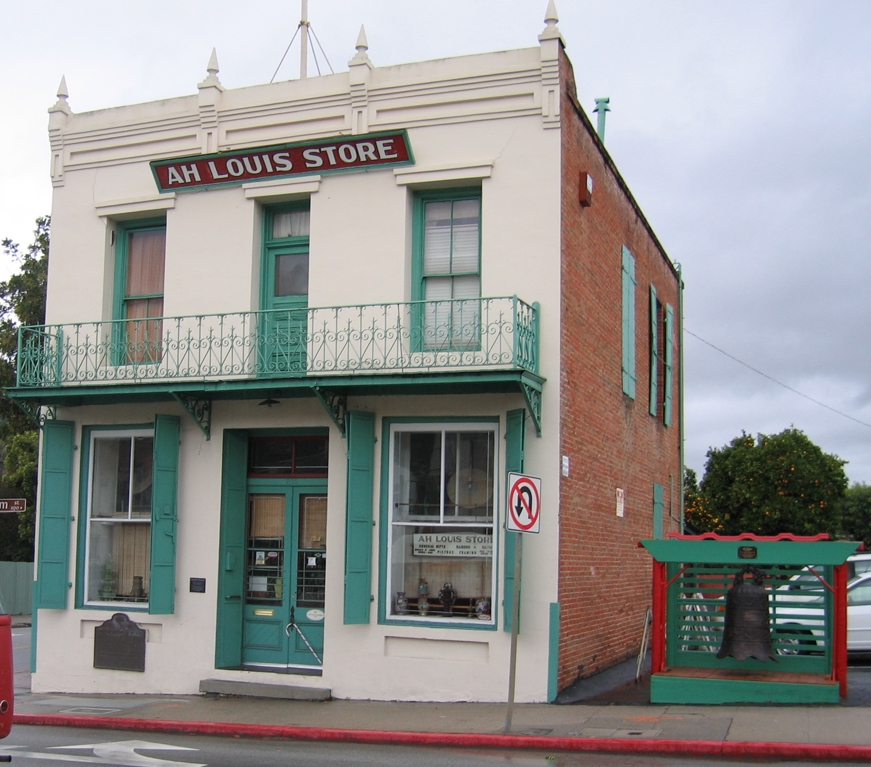
- Ah Louis Store
- Location: 800 Palm Street; San Luis Obispo, California

History
- Built: 1885

Seeing a need for the California Central Coast's Chinese community, Louis opened a small East Asian mercantile in 1874, the first in San Luis Obispo County, from which he sold goods, including rice, rum, and opium (the use of opium was legal until 1915). Louis lived on the upper floor with his family from 1885 to 1936.

The wooden structure was replaced by a sturdy brick building in 1885, made from bricks from his own brickyard, at 800 Palm Street on the corner of Chorro Street in downtown San Luis Obispo, marking where the city's Chinatown once stood. The ground floor is now operated as a retail store.

The Ah Louis store has been designated as California State Historical Landmark number 802 and is also listed on the National Register of Historic Places.

== Family ==
Since coming to the United States, Louis regularly wrote to his family in Taishan and sent them a part of his wages. Over the course of 70 years, he traveled back to China three times for visits.

Ah Louis married his first wife in China in 1860. She was in California in 1868, but returned to China about 1873. Louis last saw her in China in 1888. The 1880 census shows a wife living with him, but no children are shown. In May 1889, Ah Louis married Eng Gon Ying (Silver Dove) in San Francisco. Together they raised their eight children (five sons and three daughters) in their residence above the Ah Louis Store.

In 1909 Eng Gon Ying Louis was murdered by Willie Louis, Ah Louis's son from his first marriage. In December 1932, accompanied by sons Fred and Howard, Ah Louis returned to China, intending to visit family and to follow the tradition of dying where one was born. Disappointed with the lack of progress and modern technology and the high rate of banditry, Ah decided to return to San Luis Obispo. He died on December 16, 1936.

The youngest and last surviving of Ah Louis's children, Howard W. Louis, who had a degree in economics and fought in World War II with Gen. George S. Patton, Jr., continued to run the store until the late 1990s and died on August 15, 2008, at the age of 100. The store was damaged by the 2003 San Simeon earthquake and afterwards condemned by the City of San Luis Obispo. Around this time, the store was acquired by Ah Louis's great-grandson, William J. Watson, M.D., who restored the building and its interior. It was placed on the National Register of Historic Places in 2008.

== See also ==
- City of San Luis Obispo Historic Resources
- Murder of Gon Ying Louis
