= The Powerhouse (San Luis Obispo, California) =

- U.S. National Register of Historic Places
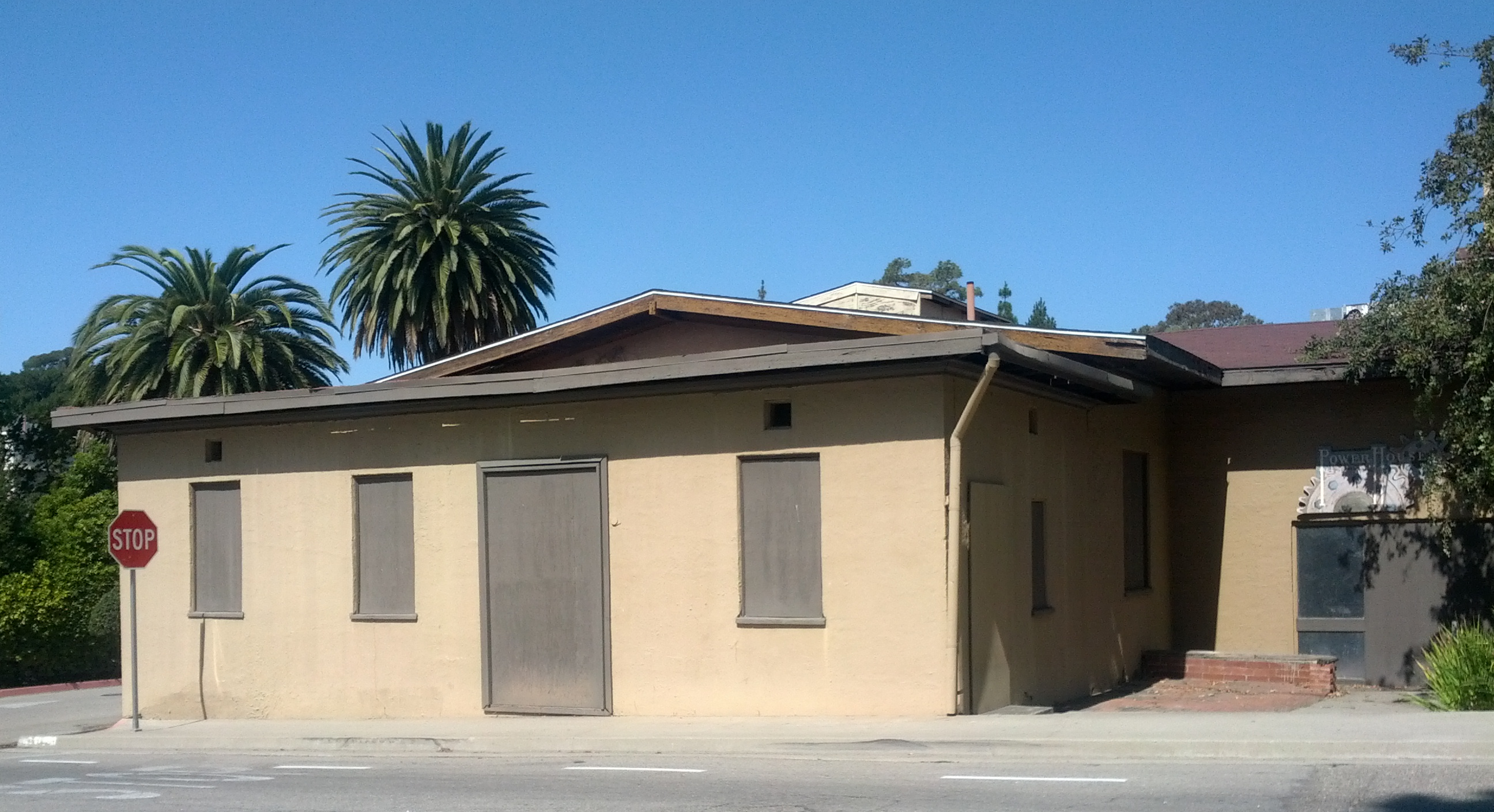

- Location within California Location within the United States
- Location: Jct. of S. Perimeter Rd. and Cuesta Ave., NE corner, San Luis Obispo, California
- Coordinates: 35°17′57″N 120°39′45″W
- Area: less than one acre
- Architect: California State Department of Engineering
- Architectural style: Mission Revival
- NRHP reference No.: 93000670
- Added to NRHP: July 30, 1993

The Powerhouse is a historic building located on the California Polytechnic State University campus in San Luis Obispo, California. Built from 1909 to 1910, it is the oldest building still standing at Cal Poly.

The design of the building was long mis-attributed to William H. Weeks, who had designed the original Cal Poly power house at the northern end of campus. However, the architectural plans for the 1909 building were created by the State of California Department of Engineering, under State Engineer Nat Ellery.

The building is designed in the Mission Revival style. The building originally served as a power plant run by students and two full-time supervisors, and held Mechanics and Electrical Engineering classes. The Powerhouse stopped generating power in the 1940s and was replaced and abandoned in 1955. In 1967, the building found a new use when the school's College of Architecture and Environmental Design decided to hold classes there. The college continued to hold classes in the building even after the construction of a new architecture building, and only stopped in 1990 when the school's administration ordered the building to be abandoned.

The Powerhouse was added to the National Register of Historic Places on July 30, 1993.
