= 2003 San Simeon earthquake =

Earthquake in California

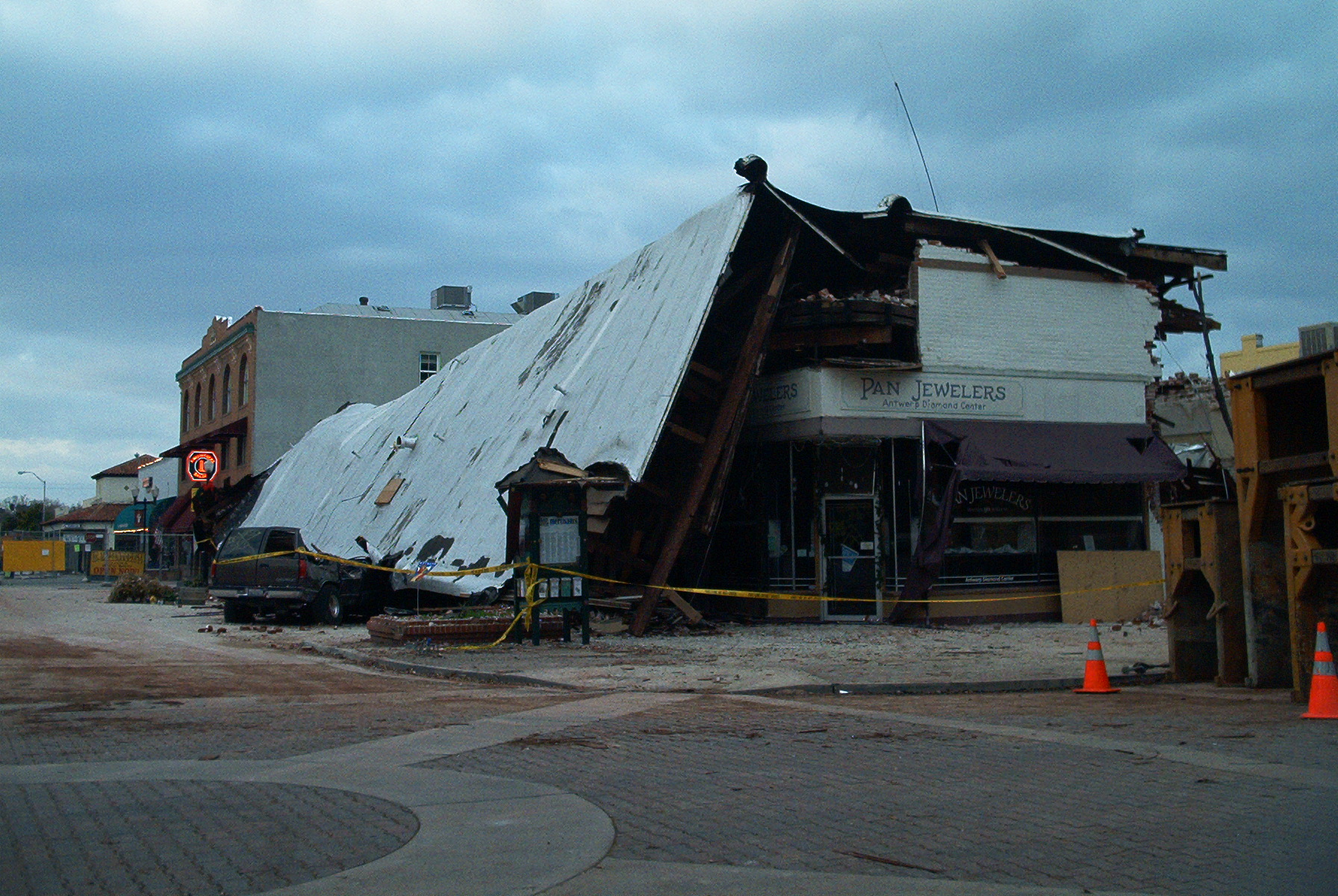
- The earthquake caused significant damage to Pan Jewelers upon collapse of the Acorn Building

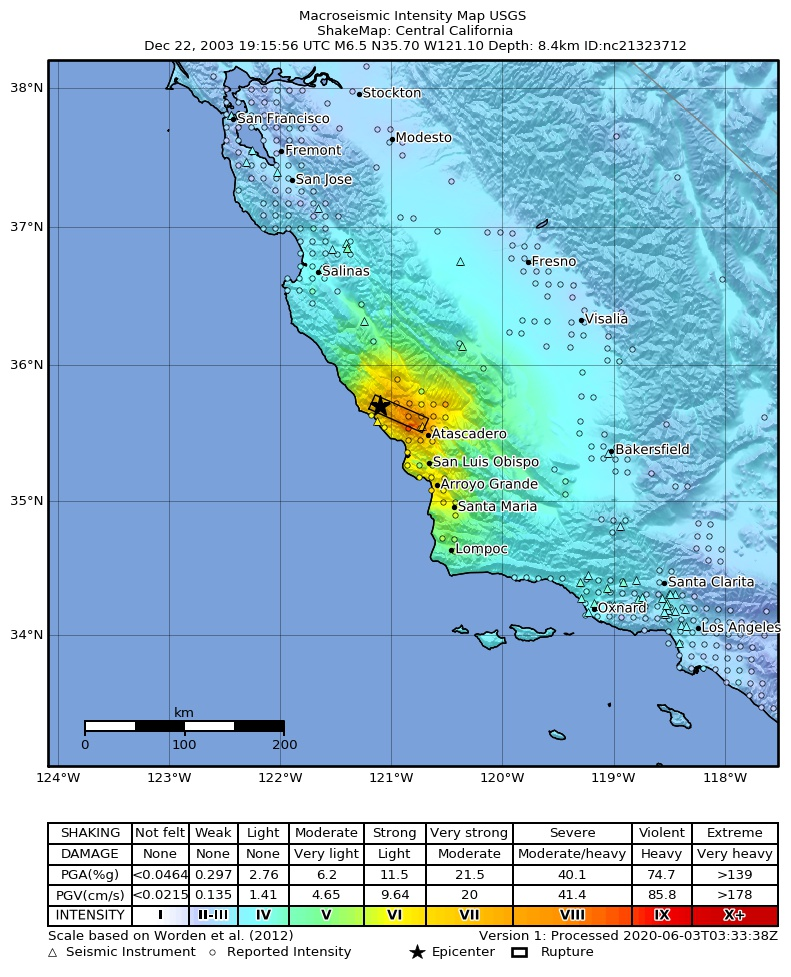
- ShakeMap made by the United States Geological Survey for the earthquake

- UTC time: 2003-12-22 19:15:56
- ISC event: 7215050
- USGS-ANSS: ComCat
- Local date: December 22, 2003
- Local time: 11:15
- Magnitude: 6.6 M_{w}
- Depth: 10 mi (16 km)
- Epicenter: 35.62°N 121.07°W
- Type: Blind thrust
- Areas affected: Central Coast (California); United States
- Total damage: $250–300 million
- Max. intensity: MMI VIII (Severe)
- Casualties: 2 killed 40 injured

The 2003 San Simeon earthquake struck at 11:15 PST (19:15 UTC) on December 22 on the Central Coast of California, about 7 miles (11 km) northeast of San Simeon. Probably centered in the Oceanic fault zone within the Santa Lucia Mountains, it was caused by thrust faulting and the rupture propagated southeast from the hypocenter for 12 miles (19 km).

The most violent ground movement was within 50 miles of the epicenter, though the earthquake was felt as far away as Los Angeles. With a moment magnitude of 6.6, it was the most destructive earthquake to hit the United States since the Northridge quake of 1994.

== Damage ==
The area around the epicenter being sparsely populated, the most severe damage was in Paso Robles, 24 miles (39 km) east-southeast. Two women were killed when the Acorn Building, an unreinforced masonry structure built in 1892, collapsed. Other unreinforced masonry buildings, some more than a century old, were extensively damaged. No structure that had even partial retrofitting collapsed.

Two sulfur hot springs in Paso Robles erupted after the earthquake. One was underneath the parking lot of the recently opened city hall/library building. There was formerly a bath house at the location, and the spring was capped after it closed down. Hot water and sediment were released at a rate of about 1,300 gallons per minute (4,900 liters per minute), forming a large sinkhole and endangering the building. Emergency efforts saved the building. However, it took until 2010 to fully repair the damage and fill in the hole. This was mainly caused by the requirement for a full Environmental Impact Study, and the inability to do any work on the project, other than the initial emergency work. Another hot spring flowed out of the embankment at the Paso Robles Street exit on U.S. Route 101.

There was a wrongful death lawsuit filed by the relatives of the 2 women killed in the earthquake against Mary Mastagni, and several trusts which owned the Acorn Building. The jury found Mastagni negligent in the care and maintenance of the Acorn Building, due to not retrofitting the building, in violation of city ordinances. The jury awarded nearly $2 million to the plaintiffs.

Outside of Paso Robles the damage was less severe, with unreinforced masonry buildings taking minor to moderate damage. Buildings even 40 miles from the epicenter in San Luis Obispo suffered minor damage such as ceiling tiles falling. Brick veneers were also disproportionately affected. In addition, water tanks in Paso Robles, Templeton and Los Osos were damaged. Residential buildings, predominantly one- to two-story wood-frame structures, weathered the quake with little or no damage. The building that housed Atascadero's City Hall was damaged and vacated shortly after the quake. After extensive repairs, it reopened in August 2013. Some wineries, especially those near the epicenter along State Route 46, reported damage such as barrels toppling and bursting. The Mission San Miguel Arcángel had $15 million worth of damage. The earthquake also caused extensive damage to George H. Flamson Middle School. The main building was damaged and had to be demolished in 2004. A new building reflecting the original 1924 building was opened for use in August 2010. In Templeton, Bethel Lutheran Church (ELCA), sustained major damage to its 110+ year old building and the apse had to be rebuilt.

== Aftermath ==
Following the event, California enacted A.B. 2533, amending the California Business and Professions Code § 8875.8, requiring that certain unreinforced masonry buildings that have not been seismically retrofitted have posted notice of the potential earthquake hazard. The law was called Jenna's Bill, after Jennifer Myrick, who died in the quake.

== Faulting ==
The area where the quake struck displays a complex faulting geometry, between the active Oceanic Fault and the older Nacimiento Fault, along with possible interaction from the Hosgri and San Simeon segments of the mainly offshore San Gregorio-San Simeon-Hosgri fault zone.

== See also ==
- List of earthquakes in 2003
- List of earthquakes in California
- List of earthquakes in the United States

== Notes ==
Sources

- 2003 San Simeon Earthquake: Preliminary Earthquake Analysis – California Integrated Seismic Network
- Preliminary Observations on the December 22, 2003, San Simeon Earthquake – Earthquake Engineering Research Institute
- M6.6 – Central California – United States Geological Survey
