= Shoe Pavilion =

Footwear retailer

- Type: Public
- Industry: Retail
- Founded: 1979
- Defunct: 2008
- Fate: Bankrupt; Chapter 7 Liquidation
- Headquarters: Sherman Oaks, California
- Products: Shoes, Sandals, Flip Flops, Water Shoes

Shoe Pavilion was an off-price footwear retailer based in Sherman Oaks, California. At the time of its liquidation announcement, the chain had 116 stores throughout the Western and Southwestern areas of the United States. Shoe Pavilion began liquidating its stores on October 20, 2008.

== History ==
The company was founded in 1979 and was based in Sherman Oaks, California.

It offered a range of designer, label, and branded footwear, along with various accessories. Shoe Pavilion typically offered products at 20% to 60% lower than regular department store prices.

== Bankruptcy ==
After five straight quarterly losses, the company filed for Chapter 11 bankruptcy.

The shoe chain could not recover and eventually won permission to liquidate all its remaining stores on October 20, 2008.

== See also ==
- Kinney Shoes
- Takken's Shoes
