= San Luis Obispo, California =

- City
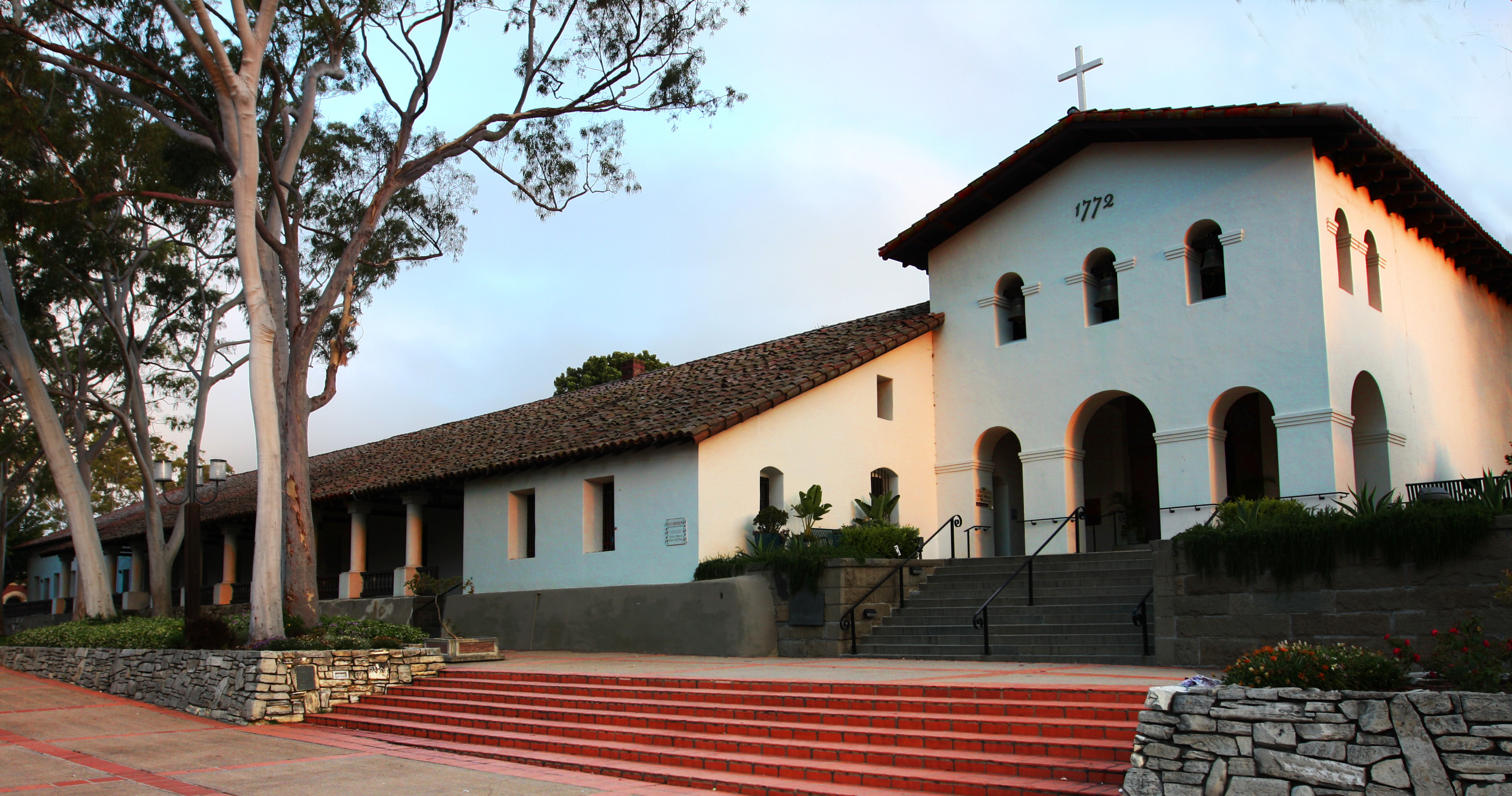
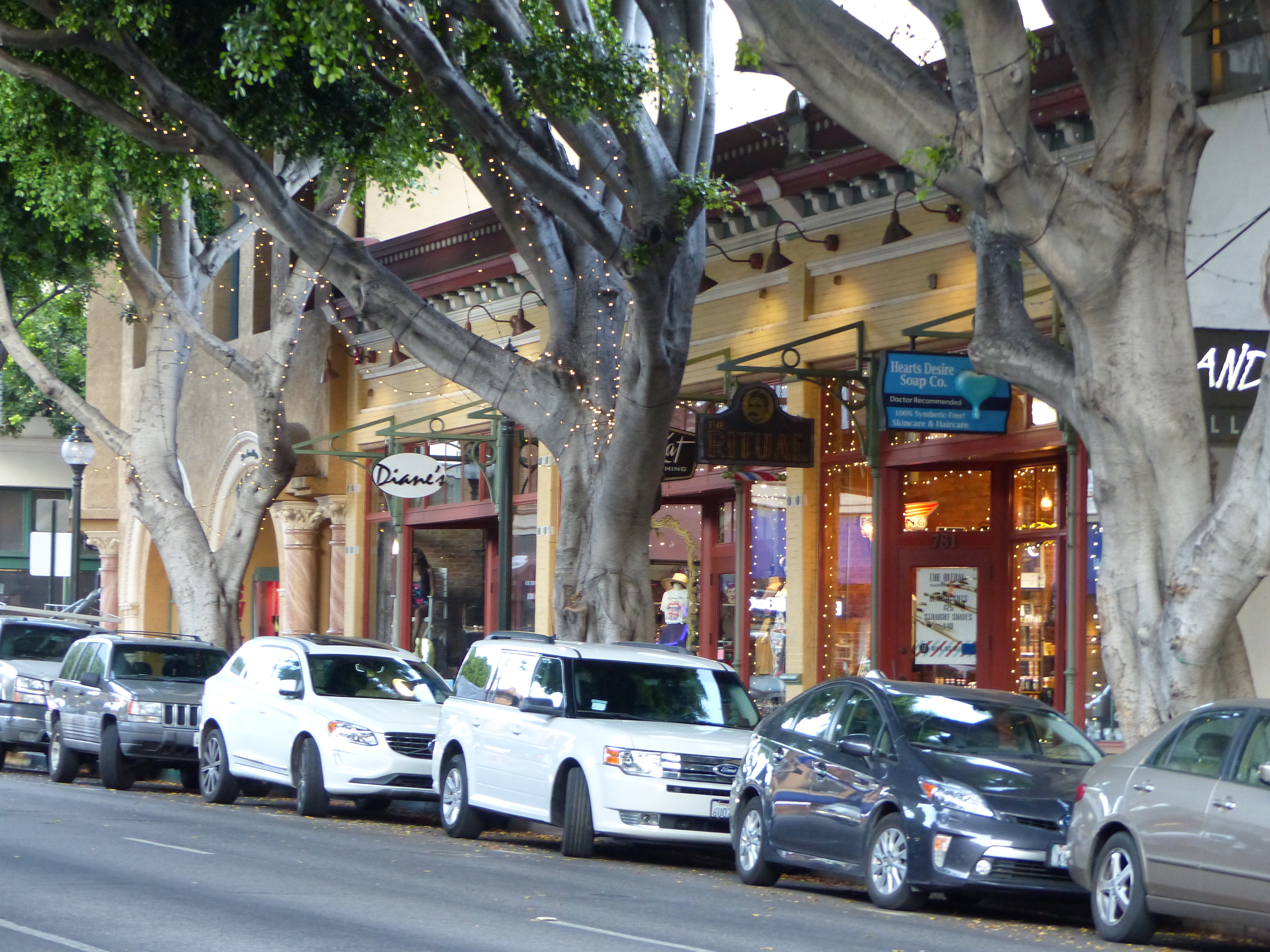
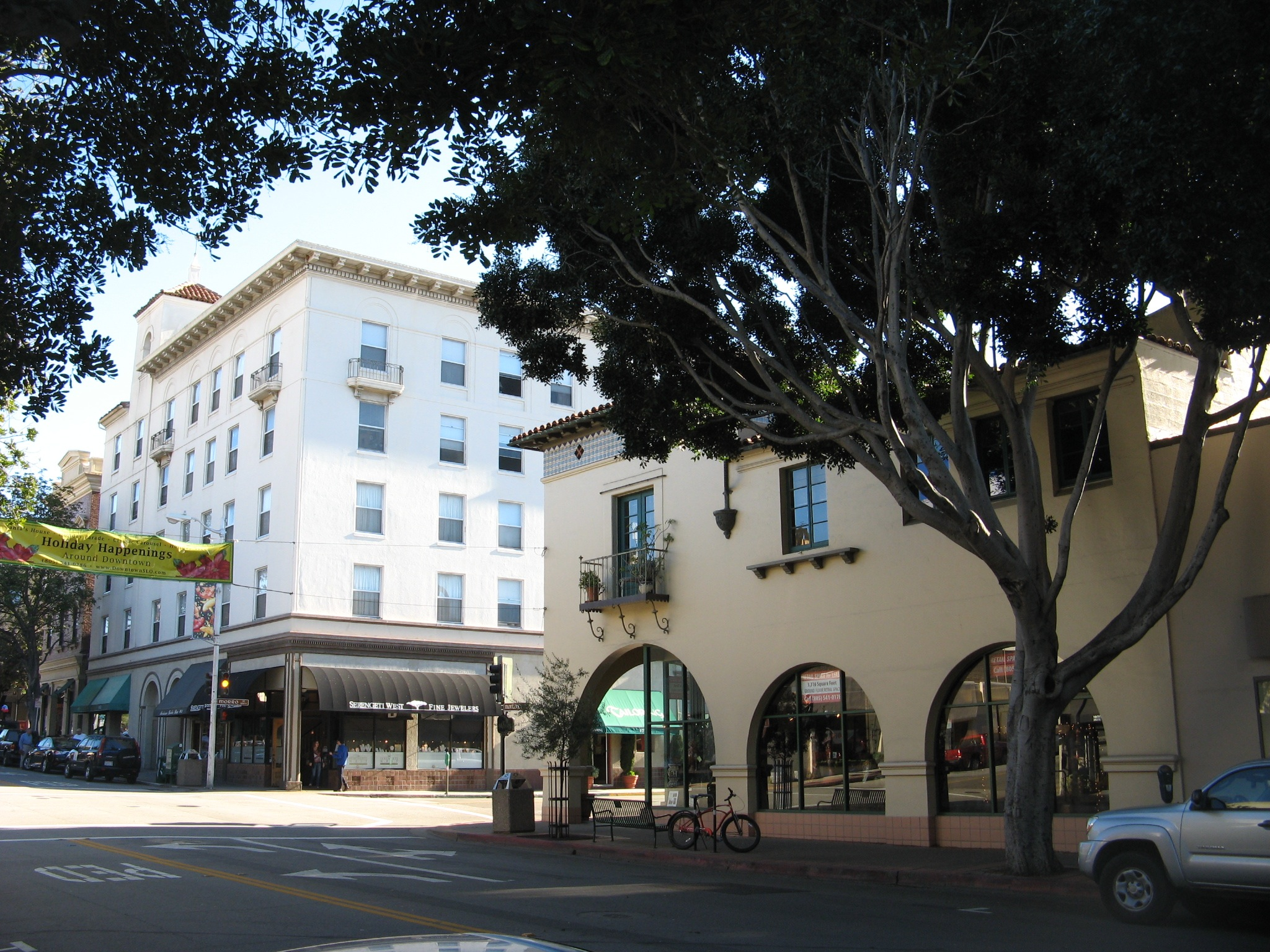
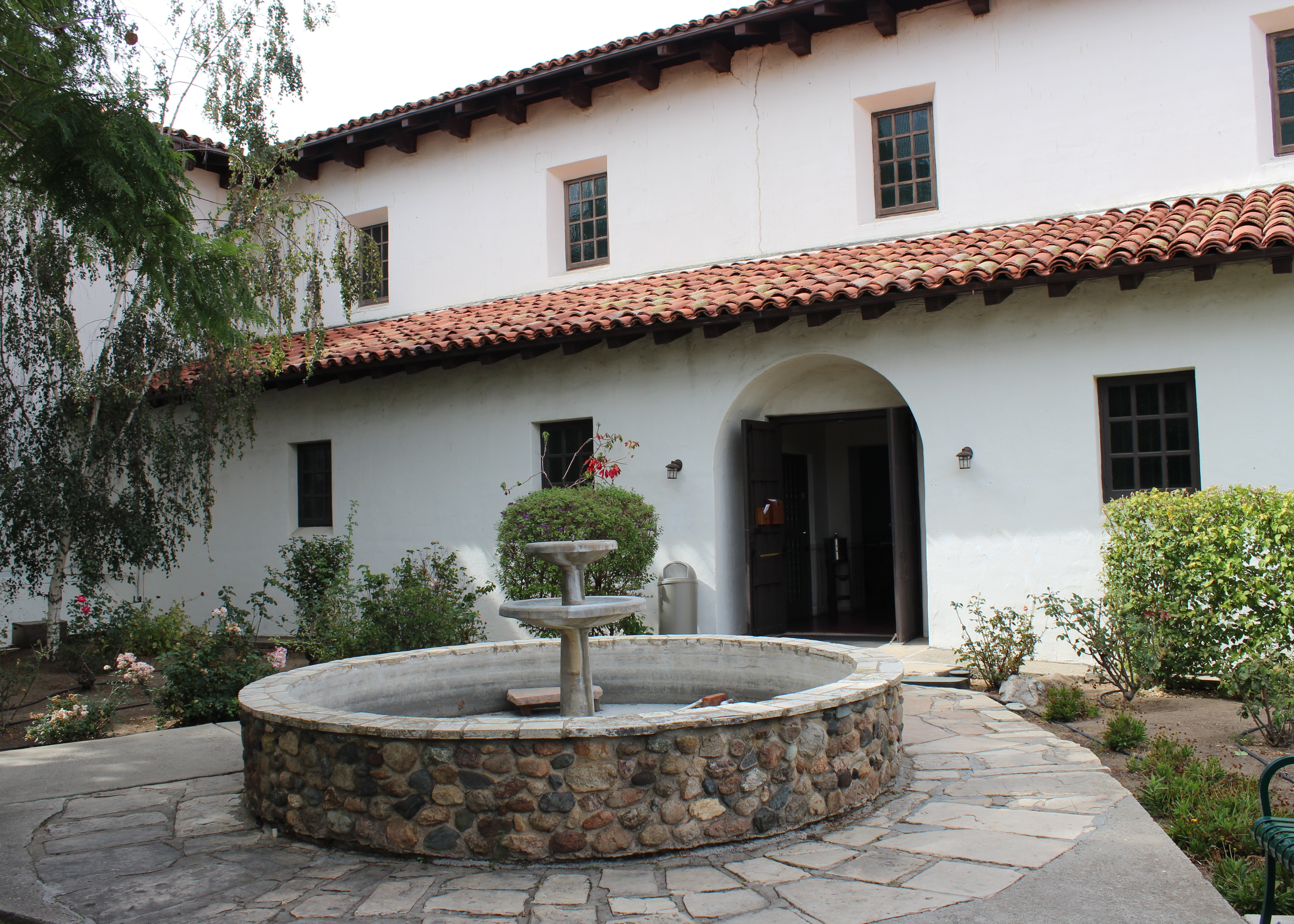
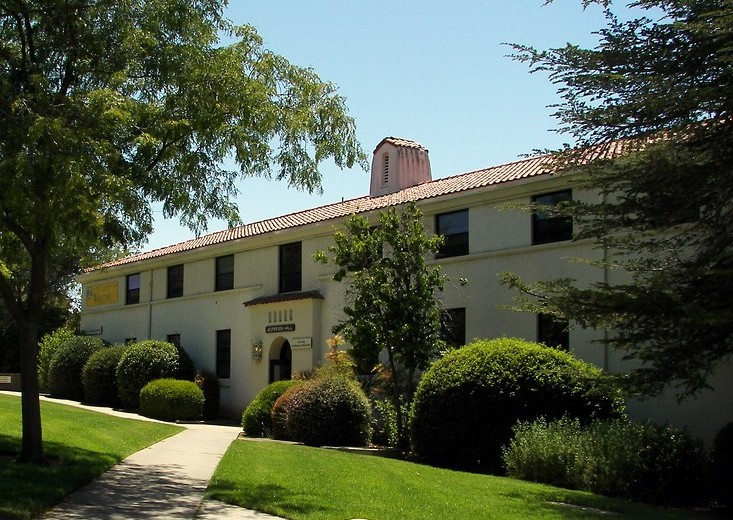
- Clockwise from top: Mission San Luis Obispo de Tolosa, Downtown San Luis, California Polytechnic State University, Mission San Luis Obispo de Tolosa, Higuera Street.

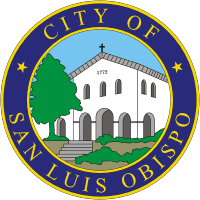
- Flag Seal
- Nicknames: "SLO", "San Luis", "SLO Town", "SLOcal", "Bispo"
- Interactive map of San Luis Obispo, California
- Location within California Location within the United States
- Coordinates: 35°16′27″N 120°39′47″W
- Country: United States
- State: California
- County: San Luis Obispo
- Founded: September 1, 1772
- Incorporated: February 16, 1856
- Named for: St. Louis of Toulouse

Government
  - Type: Mayor–council
  - Body: San Luis Obispo City Council
  - Mayor: Erica A. Stewart (D)
  - Councilmembers: List: • Vice mayor: Michelle Shoresman; • Michael R. Boswell; • Emily Francis; • Jan Marx
  - City manager: Whitney McDonald
  - State & Federal Congressmen: List: • California's 30th State Assembly district Dawn Addis (D); • California's 17th State Senate district: John Laird (D); • California's 24th congressional district: Salud Carbajal (D)

Area
  - Total: 13.45 sq mi (34.84 km^{2})
  - Land: 13.31 sq mi (34.46 km^{2})
  - Water: 0.15 sq mi (0.38 km^{2}) 1.09%
- Elevation: 233 ft (71 m)

Population (2020)
  - Total: 47,063
  - Density: 3,537/sq mi (1,366/km^{2})
- Demonym(s): San Luis Obispan; Bispoian
- Time zone: UTC-08:00 (PST)
  - Summer (DST): UTC-07:00 (PDT)
- ZIP Codes: 93401–93403, 93405–93410, 93412
- Area code: 805
- FIPS code: 06-68154
- GNIS feature IDs: 1652788, 2411796
- Congressional district: 24th
- Website: www.slocity.org

San Luis Obispo (Spanish for 'St. Louis the Bishop'; /sæn ˌluːɪs əˈbɪspoʊ/ san LOO-iss ə-BISS-poh; Spanish: [san ˈlwis oˈβispo]; Obispeño: tiłhini) is a city in and the county seat of San Luis Obispo County, California, United States. Located on the Central Coast of California, San Luis Obispo is roughly halfway between the San Francisco Bay Area in the north and Greater Los Angeles in the south. The population was 47,063 at the 2020 census.

San Luis Obispo was founded by the Spanish in 1772, when Saint Junípero Serra established Mission San Luis Obispo de Tolosa. The town grew steadily through the Mexican period before a rapid expansion of San Luis Obispo following the American Conquest of California. San Luis Obispo is a popular tourist destination, known for its historic architecture, vineyards, and hospitality, as well as for being home to California Polytechnic State University, San Luis Obispo.

== History ==
The earliest human inhabitants of the local area were the Chumash people. One of the earliest villages lies south of San Luis Obispo and reflects the landscape of the early Holocene when estuaries came farther inland. The Chumash people used marine resources of the inlets and bays along the Central Coast and inhabited a network of villages, including sites at Los Osos and Morro Creek. The tribal site on present-day San Luis Obispo was named tiłhini (Obispeño for 'Place of the full moon').

=== Spanish period ===
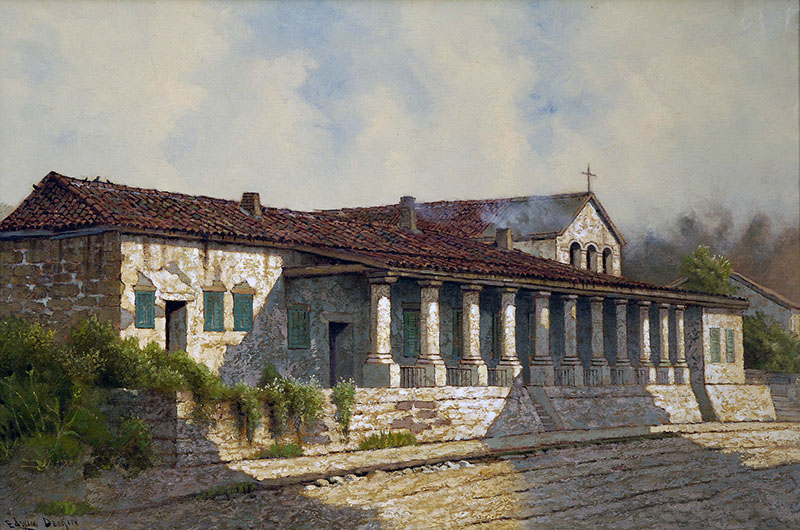
The Spanish founded San Luis Obispo on September 1, 1772, when Junípero Serra established Mission San Luis Obispo de Tolosa.

During the Spanish Empire expansion throughout the world, specifically in 1769, the Franciscan Junípero Serra received orders from Spain to bring the Catholic faith to the natives of Alta California; the idea was to unify the empire under the same religion and language. Mission San Diego de Alcalá was the first Spanish mission founded in Alta California that same year.

On September 7, 1769, an expedition led by Gaspar de Portolá entered the San Luis Obispo area from coastal areas around today's Pismo Beach. One of the expedition's three diarists, padre Juan Crespí, recorded the name given to this area by the soldiers as Cañada de Los Osos ("cañada" translates as "valley" or "canyon," and Osos translates to "bears"). The party traveled north along San Luis Obispo Creek, turned west through Los Osos Valley, and reached Morro Bay on September 9.

In 1770, Portola established the Presidio of Monterey and Junípero Serra founded the second mission, Mission San Carlos Borromeo de Carmelo in Monterey. The mission was moved to Carmel-by-the-Sea in the following year.

In 1772, as the people of Presidio of Monterey and Mission San Carlos Borromeo de Carmelo faced starvation owing to a lack of supplies, Commander Pedro Fages, a member of the Portolá expedition, led a hunting expedition to la Cañada de los Osos ("Bears Canyon") to bring back food. Over twenty-five mule loads of dried bear meat and seed were sent north to relieve the missionaries, soldiers, and neophytes (baptized natives). After this, Junípero Serra decided that la Cañada de los Osos would be an ideal place for the fifth mission.

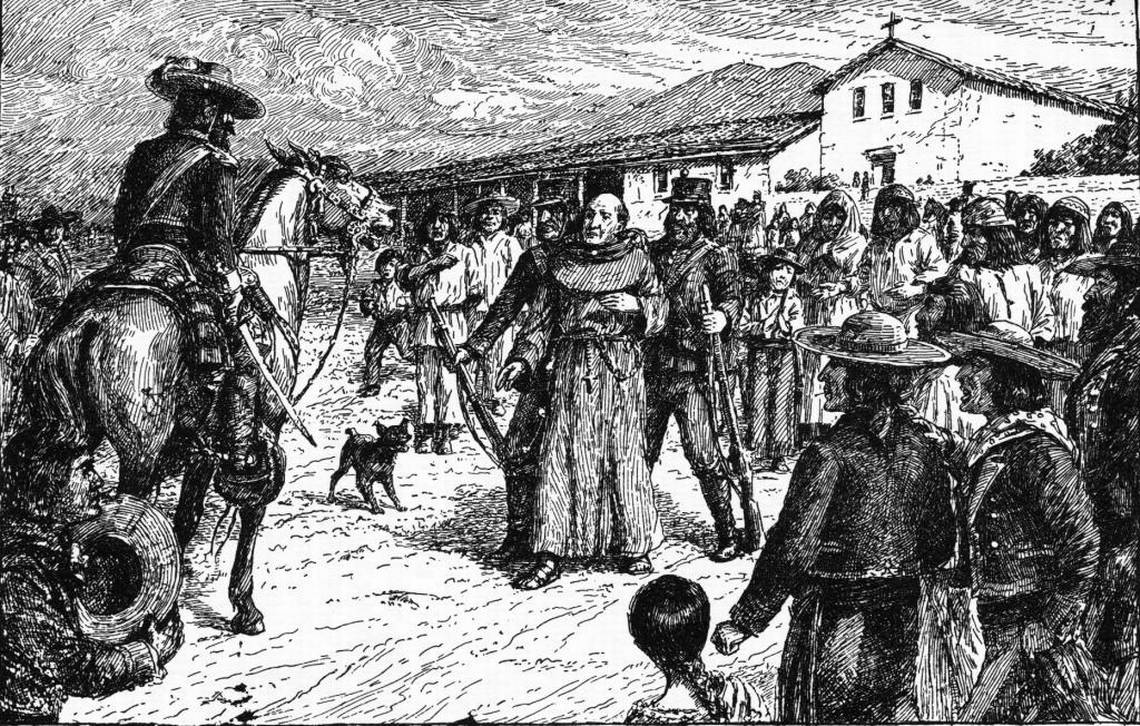
The arrest of Padre Martínez at Mission San Luis Obispo in 1830

The area had abundant food and water supplies, the climate was also very mild, and the local Chumash were very friendly. With soldiers, muleteers, and pack animals carrying mission supplies, Junípero Serra set out from Carmel to reach the Valley of the Bears. On September 1, 1772, Junípero Serra celebrated the first Mass with a cross erected near San Luis Creek. The next day, he departed for San Diego, leaving Fr. José Cavaller with the difficult task of building the mission. Fr. José Cavaller, five soldiers and two neophytes began building the Mission San Luis Obispo de Tolosa, which would later become the town of San Luis Obispo. Both the mission and town were named after Louis, bishop of Toulouse, France, known in Spanish as "Luis, obispo de Tolosa".

=== Mexican period ===
When the Mexican War of Independence from Spain broke out in 1810, all California missions had to become virtually self-sufficient, receiving few funds or supplies from Spanish sources. Beginning soon after Mexico won her independence from Spain in 1821, anti-Spanish feelings led to calls for expulsion of the Spanish Franciscans and secularization of the missions. Because the fledgling Mexican government had many more important problems to deal with than far-off California, actual secularization did not happen until the mid-1830s.

After 1834, the mission became an ordinary parish, and most of its huge land holdings were broken up into land grants called ranchos. The ranchos were given by Mexican land grant from 1837 to 1846, with the mission itself being granted in the final year. The central community, however, remained in the same location and formed the nucleus of today's city of San Luis Obispo.

=== American period ===
Following the American Conquest of California, San Luis Obispo was the first town incorporated in the newly formed San Luis Obispo County. It remains the center of the county to the present. Early in the American period, the region was well known for lawlessness. It gained a reputation as "Barrio del Tigre" (or Tiger-Town) because of the endemic problem. Robberies and murders that left no witnesses were carried out on along the El Camino Real and elsewhere around San Luis Obispo for several years. Finally a gang of eight men committed a robbery with three murders and a kidnapping at the Rancho San Juan Capistrano del Camote in May 1858, that uncharacteristically left two witnesses alive. This brought about the formation of a vigilance committee in the County that killed one, the suspected leader of the gang Pio Linares, and lynched six others, a total of seven men suspected of such misdeeds (the most lethal in California history). Members of the committee remained influential members of the community for decades.

The ranchos remained focused on cattle after the conquest of California. With the discovery of gold, the county experienced a major economic surge with the rising price of beef, with the highest prices coming in 1851. The county remained focused on cattle until 1863, when a drought left most ranchos devastated. Residents quickly turned to other venues, leading to the breaking up of many of the ranchos and a major change in the economic climate of the town, which focused less on cattle ranching and more on dairies, agriculture, and mined goods from then onward.

San Luis Obispo once had a burgeoning Chinatown in the vicinity of Palm Street and Chorro Street. Laborers were brought from China by Ah Louis in order to construct the Pacific Coast Railway, roads connecting San Luis Obispo over the Cuesta Pass to Paso Robles and from Paso Robles to Cambria, and also the 1884 to 1894 tunneling through Cuesta Ridge for the Southern Pacific Railroad. The town's Chinatown revolved around Ah Louis Store and other Palm Street businesses owned and run by Chinese business people. Today, Mee Heng Low chop suey shop is all that remains of the culture, although a slightly Chinatown-themed commercial development has been planned. A display of some of the unearthed relics from this period can be seen on the first floor of the Palm Street parking garage, which was built over the location where Chinatown once stood. The San Luis Obispo Historical Society (adjacent to the Mission) also contains rotating historical exhibits.

San Luis Obispo was also a popular stop en route to Los Angeles. U.S. Route 101 and California State Route 1 were constructed with the rise of car culture. Due to its popularity as a stop, it was the location of the first motel in the world, the Milestone Mo-Tel.

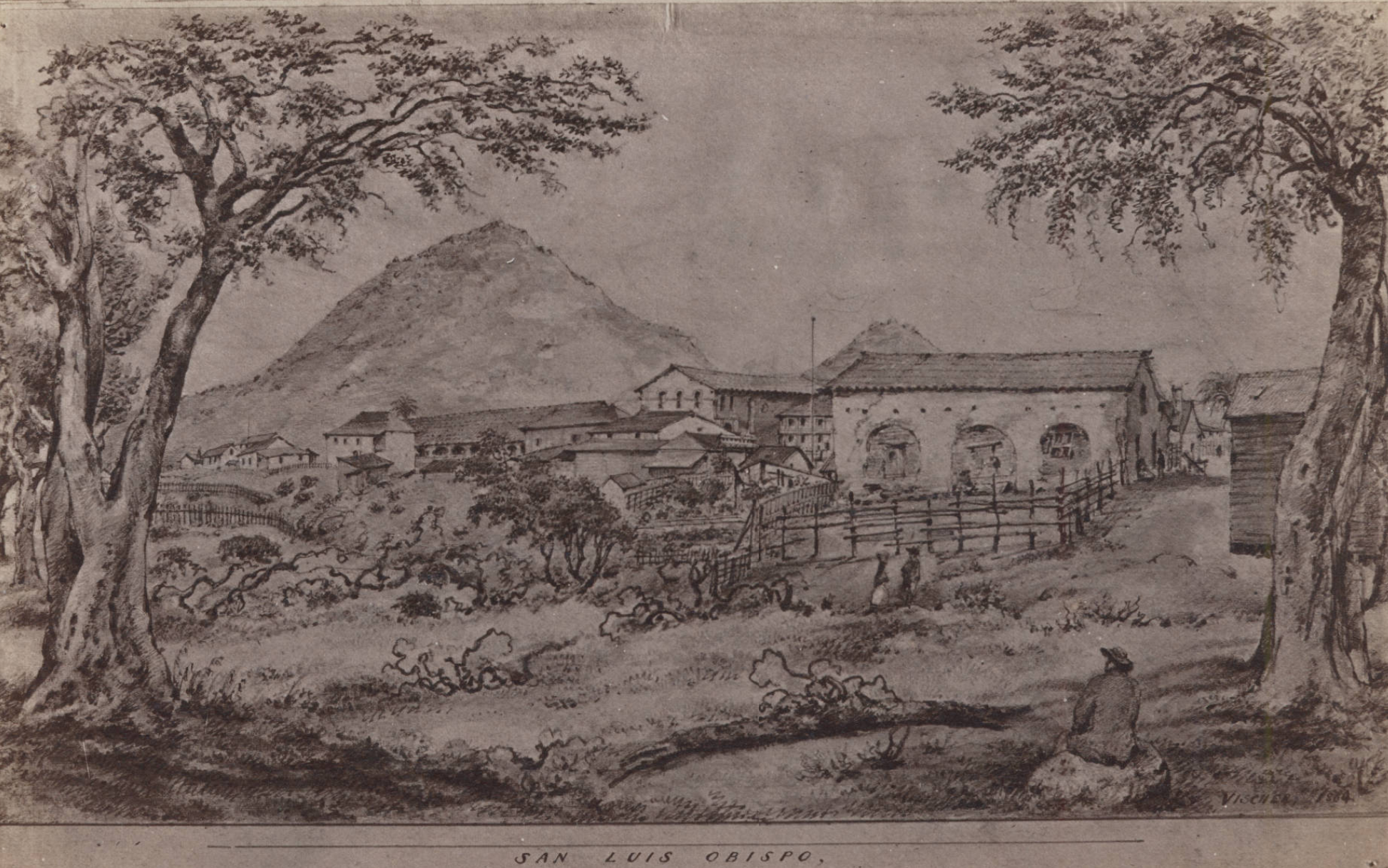
San Luis Obispo in 1864

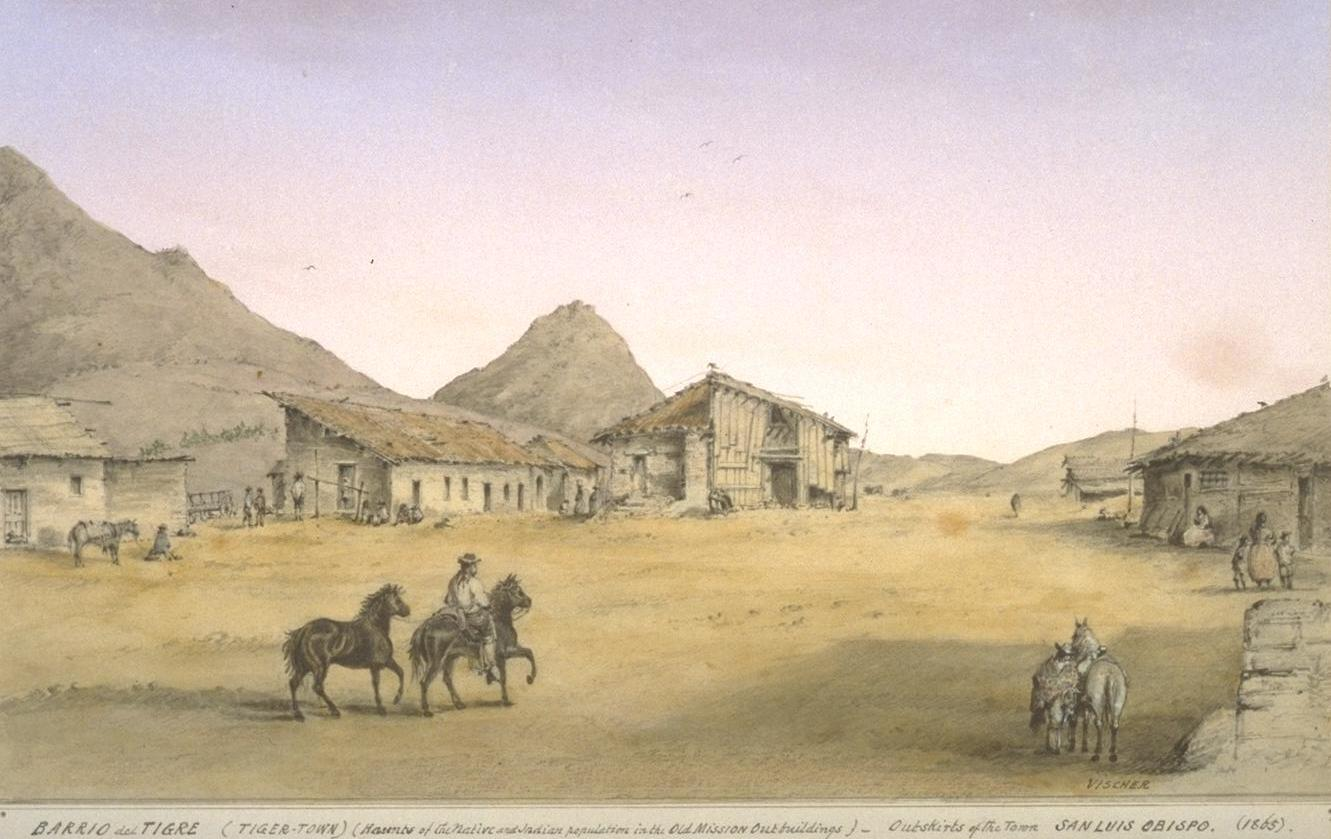
San Luis Obispo was known as the Barrio del Tigre (Spanish for 'Tiger Town') in the late 19th century, owing to the multitude of robberies and murders taking place there.

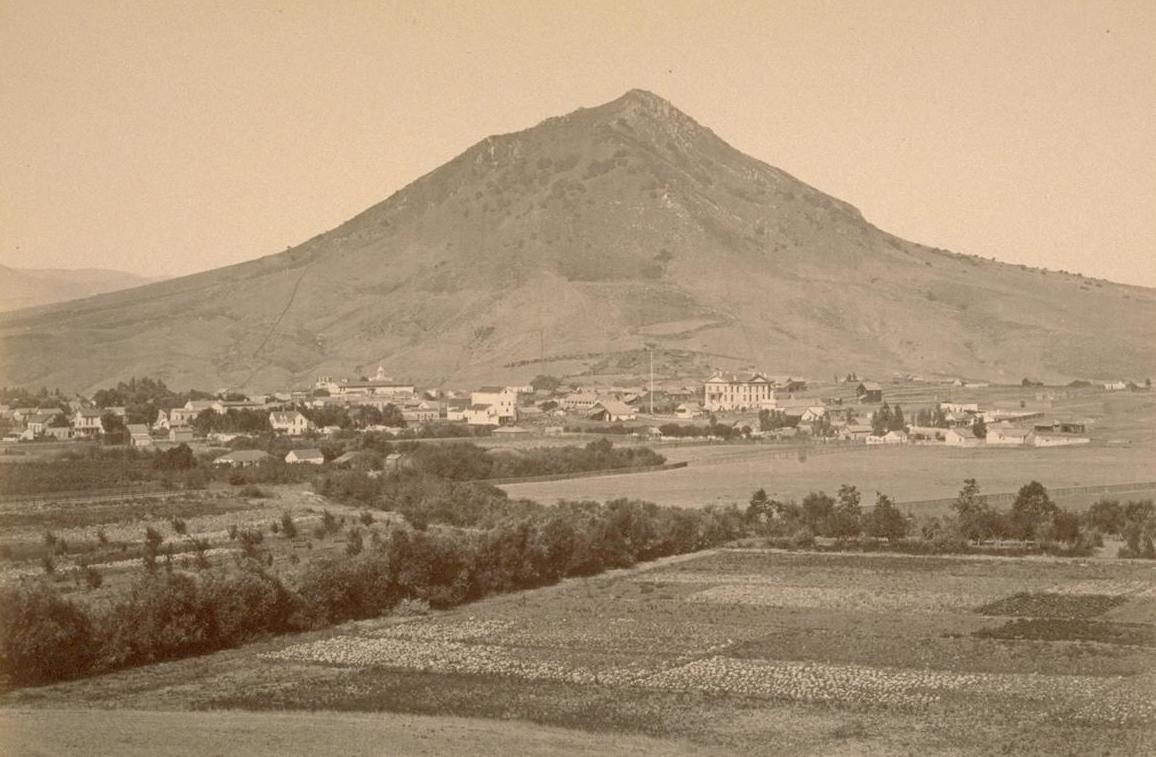
San Luis in the late 19th century

== Geography ==
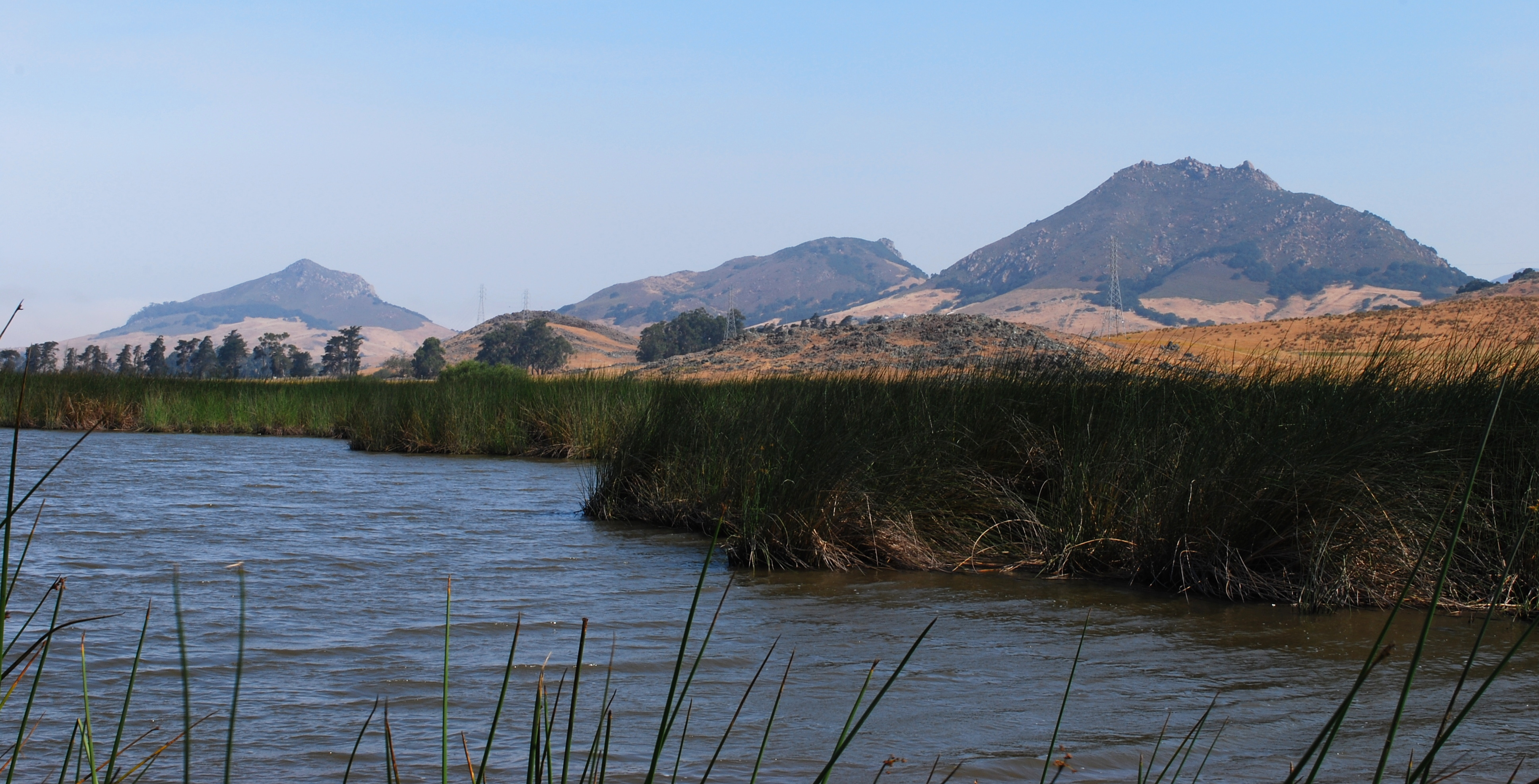
Three of the Nine Morros, showing Cerro Romauldo (left), Chumash Peak (center), and Bishop Peak (right)

San Luis Obispo is located on U.S. Route 101, about 31 miles (50 km) north of Santa Maria.

According to the United States Census Bureau, the city has a total area of 13.45 square miles (34.8 km^{2}), of which 13.3 square miles (34 km^{2}) is land and 0.15 square miles (0.39 km^{2}) (1.09%) is water.

San Luis Obispo is on the West Coast of the United States and in the Central Coast of California. The Pacific Ocean is approximately 11 miles (18 km) west of San Luis Obispo. The Santa Lucia Mountains lie just east of San Luis Obispo. These mountains are the headwaters for San Luis Obispo Creek, whose watershed encompasses 84 square miles (220 km^{2}) surrounding the city and flows to the Pacific Ocean at Avila Beach.

San Luis Obispo is a seismically active area; there are a number of nearby faults including the San Andreas Fault. The Nine Sisters are a string of hills that partially run through San Luis Obispo. They are geologically noteworthy for being volcanic plugs. Six of the nine peaks are open to the public for recreation.

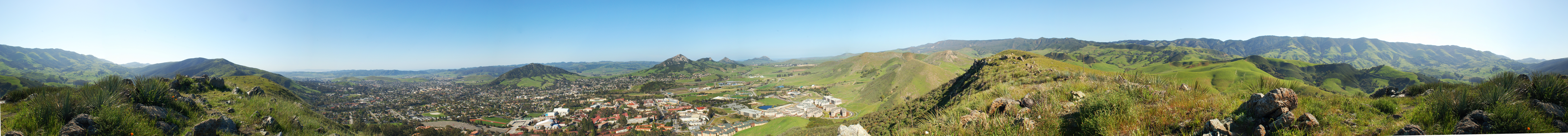
Panorama of San Luis Obispo, showing Cerro San Luis and Bishop Peak in the middle, with California Polytechnic State University, San Luis Obispo below

=== Climate ===
San Luis Obispo experiences a warm Mediterranean climate (Köppen climate classification Csb). On average it has 50 days with measurable rain per year, mostly during winter months. Summers are generally warm and sunny, often with morning fog from the Pacific coast. Winters are generally not very cold, though below freezing lows occur 2.6 nights per year on average. Measurable snowfall in San Luis Obispo has not officially been recorded since records began in 1870, although photos show about 0.3 inches (0.76 cm) fell in 1922 and snow flurries were reported in both 1988 and 2006. Temperatures do, however, vary widely at any time of the year, with 80 °F (27 °C) readings in January and February not uncommon.

Although heat extremes above 110 °F (43.3 °C) have been recorded, the maritime moderation is generally strong due to the proximity to the cool ocean waters. The hottest temperature on record is officially at 113 °F (45 °C) on September 6, 2020, although a 120 reading was reported in the local news. Nights remain cool year round due to cold-current ocean air in summer and being in a valley subject to inversion, although seldom cold. The warmest night recorded was 75 °F (24 °C) on September 22, 1939, and the coldest day at 40 °F (4 °C) on December 11, 1932. Precipitation averages about 22 inches (560 mm) per year, almost all of which falls between November and April.

Climate data for San Luis Obispo, California (CPSU), 1991–2020 normals, extremes 1927–present, precipitation 1893-2012
Month	Jan	Feb	Mar	Apr	May	Jun	Jul	Aug	Sep	Oct	Nov	Dec	Year
Record high °F (°C)	90 (32)	89 (32)	92 (33)	104 (40)	102 (39)	108 (42)	111 (44)	107 (42)	113 (45)	109 (43)	98 (37)	92 (33)	113 (45)
Mean maximum °F (°C)	78.3 (25.7)	79.7 (26.5)	82.5 (28.1)	87.8 (31.0)	89.1 (31.7)	91.3 (32.9)	90.9 (32.7)	93.8 (34.3)	97.9 (36.6)	96.2 (35.7)	86.8 (30.4)	76.7 (24.8)	102.0 (38.9)
Mean daily maximum °F (°C)	64.9 (18.3)	65.2 (18.4)	67.3 (19.6)	69.3 (20.7)	71.9 (22.2)	75.7 (24.3)	78.3 (25.7)	79.7 (26.5)	80.1 (26.7)	77.8 (25.4)	70.8 (21.6)	64.4 (18.0)	72.1 (22.3)
Daily mean °F (°C)	54.4 (12.4)	54.8 (12.7)	56.7 (13.7)	58.0 (14.4)	60.6 (15.9)	63.8 (17.7)	66.3 (19.1)	67.3 (19.6)	67.0 (19.4)	64.7 (18.2)	59.1 (15.1)	54.0 (12.2)	60.6 (15.9)
Mean daily minimum °F (°C)	44.0 (6.7)	44.4 (6.9)	46.1 (7.8)	46.8 (8.2)	49.3 (9.6)	51.8 (11.0)	54.2 (12.3)	54.8 (12.7)	53.8 (12.1)	51.5 (10.8)	47.7 (8.7)	43.7 (6.5)	49.0 (9.4)
Mean minimum °F (°C)	33.9 (1.1)	34.5 (1.4)	36.8 (2.7)	38.3 (3.5)	42.0 (5.6)	45.3 (7.4)	48.6 (9.2)	49.5 (9.7)	46.4 (8.0)	41.6 (5.3)	36.4 (2.4)	33.2 (0.7)	33.2 (0.7)
Record low °F (°C)	24 (−4)	21 (−6)	28 (−2)	29 (−2)	32 (0)	35 (2)	36 (2)	40 (4)	35 (2)	30 (−1)	23 (−5)	17 (−8)	17 (−8)
Average precipitation inches (mm)	4.96 (126)	4.61 (117)	3.37 (86)	1.53 (39)	0.43 (11)	0.12 (3.0)	0.02 (0.51)	0.04 (1.0)	0.25 (6.4)	0.92 (23)	2.14 (54)	4.01 (102)	22.4 (568.91)
Average precipitation days (≥ 0.01 in)	8.7	9.8	8.6	4.1	2.4	0.7	0.5	0.2	0.7	3.2	4.4	8.4	51.7
Source 1: NOAA
Source 2: Western Regional Climate Center

== Demographics ==
Historical population
Census	Pop.	Note	%±
1880	2,243		—
1890	2,995		33.5%
1900	3,021		0.9%
1910	5,157		70.7%
1920	5,895		14.3%
1930	8,276		40.4%
1940	8,881		7.3%
1950	14,180		59.7%
1960	20,437		44.1%
1970	28,036		37.2%
1980	34,252		22.2%
1990	41,958		22.5%
2000	44,174		5.3%
2010	45,119		2.1%
2020	47,063		4.3%
2024 (est.)	49,729	▲	5.7%
U.S. Decennial Census

=== 2020 census ===
As of the 2020 census, San Luis Obispo had a population of 47,063 and a population density of 3,537.2 inhabitants per square mile (1,365.7/km^{2}).

The census reported that 97.0% of the population lived in households, 2.2% lived in non-institutionalized group quarters, and 0.8% were institutionalized. In addition, 99.5% of residents lived in urban areas and 0.5% lived in rural areas.

There were 19,772 households, out of which 20.0% included children under the age of 18. Of all households, 33.4% were married-couple households, 6.8% were cohabiting couple households, 33.1% had a female householder with no spouse or partner present, and 26.7% had a male householder with no spouse or partner present. About 33.1% of households were one person, and 12.1% were one person aged 65 or older. The average household size was 2.31. There were 9,020 families (45.6% of all households).

The age distribution was 14.6% under the age of 18, 25.7% aged 18 to 24, 25.2% aged 25 to 44, 18.3% aged 45 to 64, and 16.2% who were 65 years of age or older. The median age was 31.4 years. For every 100 females, there were 96.7 males, and for every 100 females age 18 and over there were 95.3 males age 18 and over.

There were 21,562 housing units at an average density of 1,620.6 units per square mile (625.7 units/km^{2}), of which 19,772 (91.7%) were occupied. Of occupied units, 41.5% were owner-occupied and 58.5% were occupied by renters. The homeowner vacancy rate was 1.2%, the rental vacancy rate was 4.9%, and 8.3% of housing units were vacant.

Racial composition as of the 2020 census
Race	Number	Percent
White	34,155	72.6%
Black or African American	533	1.1%
American Indian and Alaska Native	348	0.7%
Asian	2,910	6.2%
Native Hawaiian and Other Pacific Islander	60	0.1%
Some other race	3,156	6.7%
Two or more races	5,901	12.5%
Hispanic or Latino (of any race)	8,729	18.5%

=== 2023 ACS 5-year estimates ===
In 2023, the US Census Bureau estimated that the median household income was $66,711, and the per capita income was $45,462. About 6.5% of families and 30.0% of the population were below the poverty line. However, this number may include many college students who have little or no income.

=== 2010 census ===
The 2010 United States census reported that San Luis Obispo had a population of 45,119. The population density was 3,489.4 inhabitants per square mile (1,347.3/km^{2}). The racial makeup of San Luis Obispo was 38,117 (84.5%) White, 523 (1.2%) African American, 275 (0.6%) Native American, 2,350 (5.2%) Asian, 65 (0.1%) Pacific Islander, 1,973 (4.4%) from other races, and 1,816 (4.0%) from two or more races. Hispanic or Latino people of any race were 6,626 persons (14.7%).

The Census reported that 43,937 people (97.4% of the population) lived in households, 967 (2.1%) lived in non-institutionalized group quarters, and 215 (0.5%) were institutionalized.

There were 19,193 households, out of which 3,178 (16.6%) had children under the age of 18 living in them, 5,690 (29.6%) were opposite-sex married couples living together, 1,336 (7.0%) had a female householder with no husband present, 586 (3.1%) had a male householder with no wife present. There were 1,104 (5.8%) unmarried opposite-sex partnerships, and 124 (0.6%) same-sex married couples or partnerships. 6,213 households (32.4%) were made up of individuals, and 1,957 (10.2%) had someone living alone who was 65 years of age or older. The average household size was 2.29. There were 7,612 families (39.7% of all households); the average family size was 2.81.

The population was spread out, with 5,522 people (12.2%) under the age of 18, 15,670 people (34.7%) aged 18 to 24, 9,630 people (21.3%) aged 25 to 44, 8,866 people (19.7%) aged 45 to 64, and 5,431 people (12.0%) who were 65 years of age or older. The median age was 26.5 years. For every 100 females, there were 109.1 males. For every 100 females age 18 and over, there were 110.2 males.

There were 20,553 housing units at an average density of 1,589.5 per square mile (613.7/km^{2}), of which 7,547 (39.3%) were owner-occupied, and 11,646 (60.7%) were occupied by renters. The homeowner vacancy rate was 1.6%; the rental vacancy rate was 5.7%. 17,225 people (38.2% of the population) lived in owner-occupied housing units and 26,712 people (59.2%) lived in rental housing units.

The city has a desired maximum population of 57,200 within the urban reserve, however with the extremely rapid growth of the area it is unknown whether this population cap will remain.

== Economy ==
Downtown San Luis Obispo has many eclectic shops and boutiques. Takken's Shoes is headquartered in San Luis Obispo. Ernie Ball's Music Man factory is located in San Luis Obispo. Mindbody and iFixit have been headquartered in San Luis Obispo since their inceptions. In 2019, SLO experienced a boom in home construction along with continued building of commercial structures. As housing had not kept up with job growth, many people who cannot afford to live where they work, commute to their jobs in SLO.

Pacific Gas and Electric is the largest non-governmental employer in the city. In 2016, they announced the closure of the Diablo Canyon Nuclear Power Plant in 2025, which was expected to cost the local economy 1,500 jobs with an average salary of $157,000, as well as nearly $1 billion annually in economic activity. The plant has been granted an extension of their operating license until 2030. Congressman Salud Carbajal introduced H.R. 5441 to the House of Representatives in order to create Energy Opportunity Zones, which is designed to specifically target areas that have had a nuclear power plant shut down within 10 years (including San Luis Obispo) for federal tax credits for renewable energy generation, including solar, wind, and wave energy.

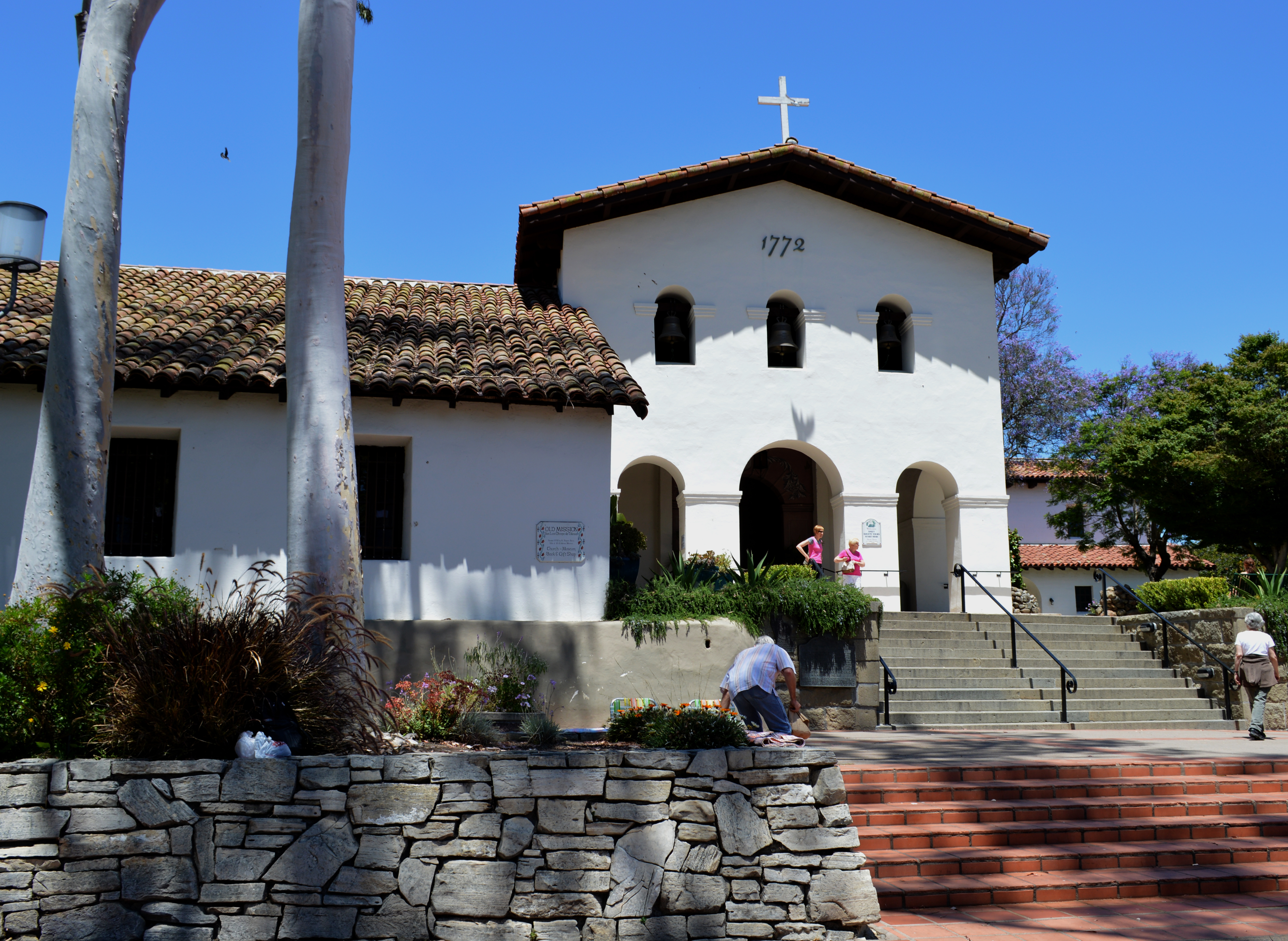
Mission San Luis Obispo de Tolosa, built in 1772, in downtown San Luis

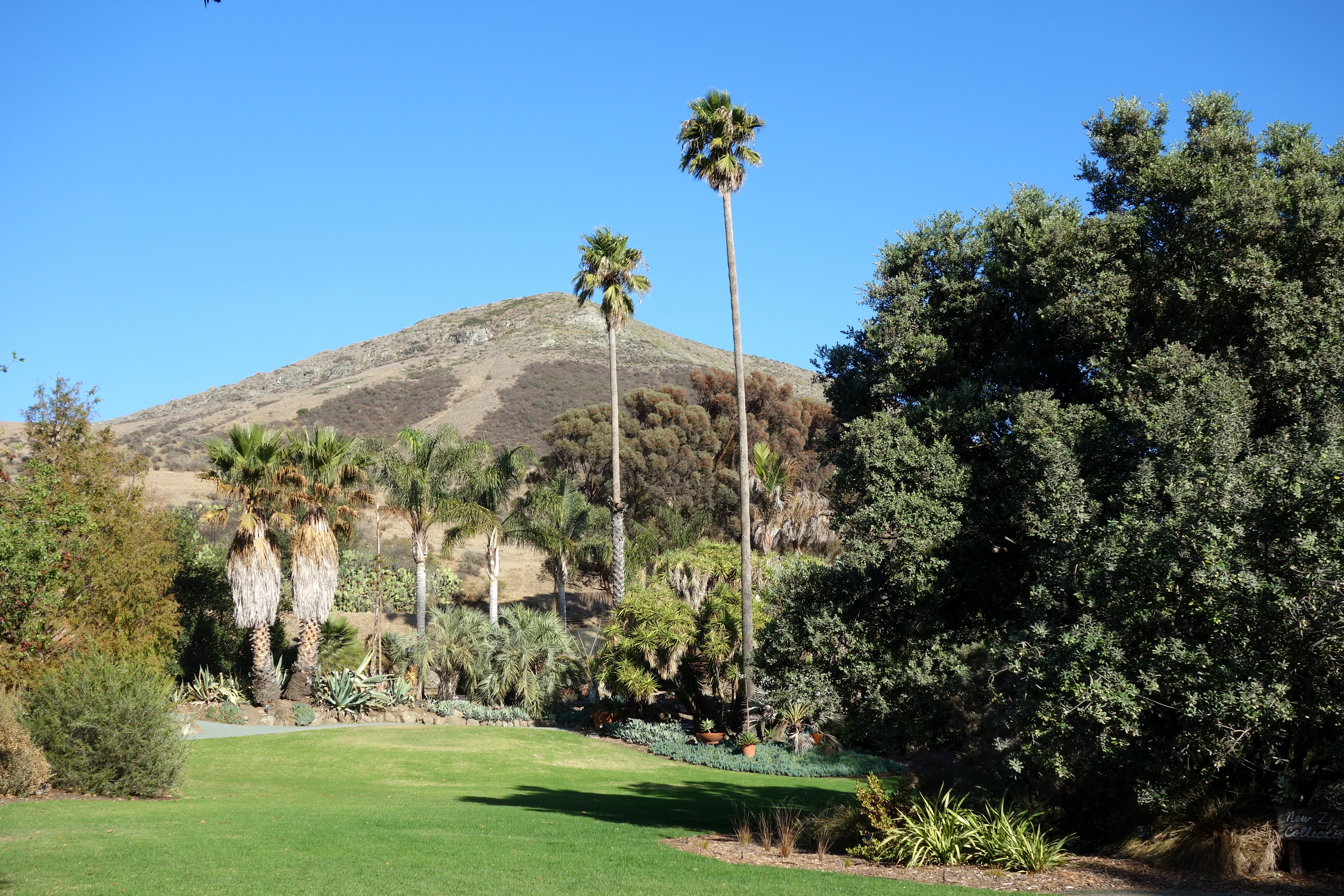
The Leaning Pine Arboretum

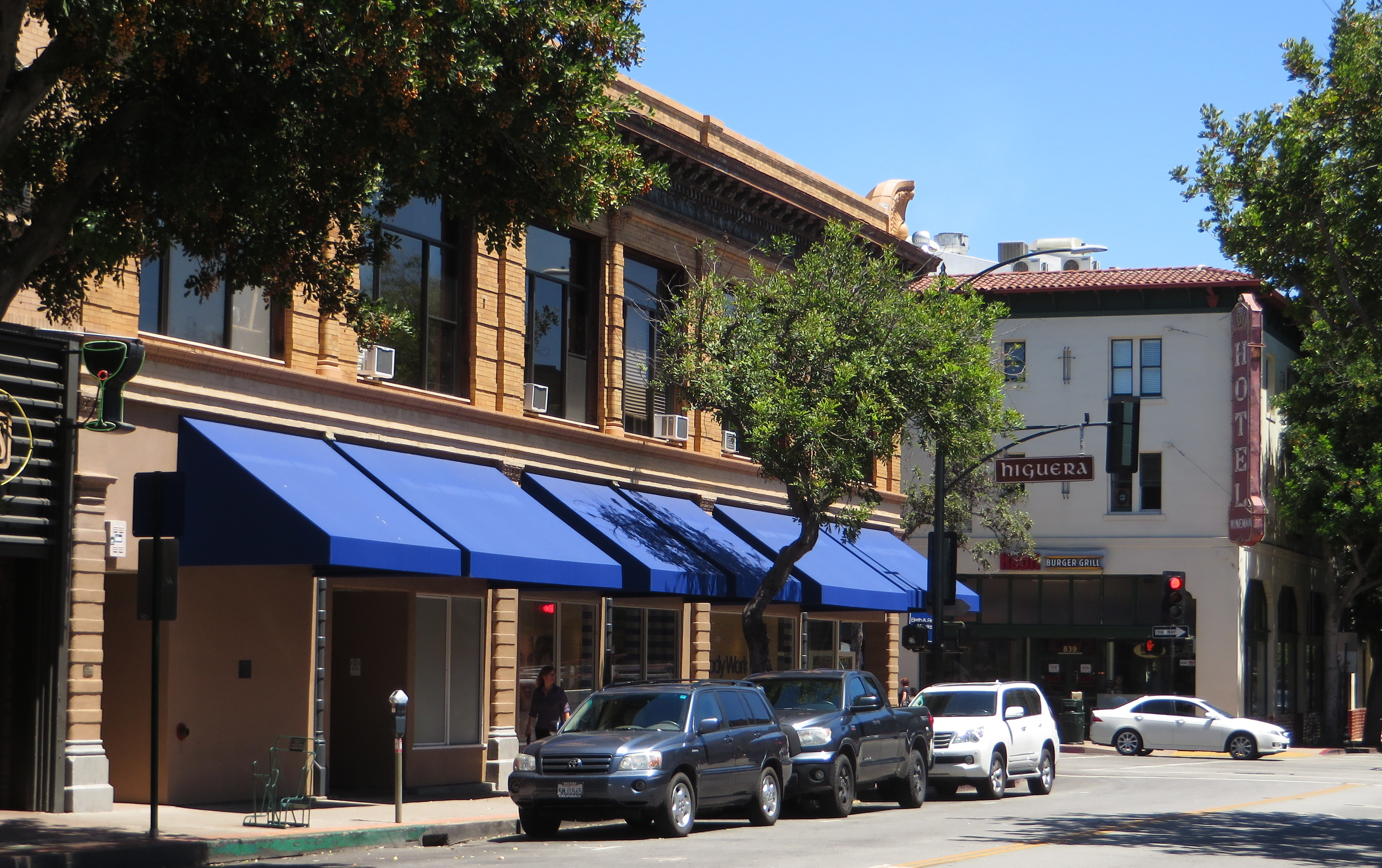
Shops at Higuera and Chorro streets in downtown San Luis

St. Anne Byzantine Catholic Church

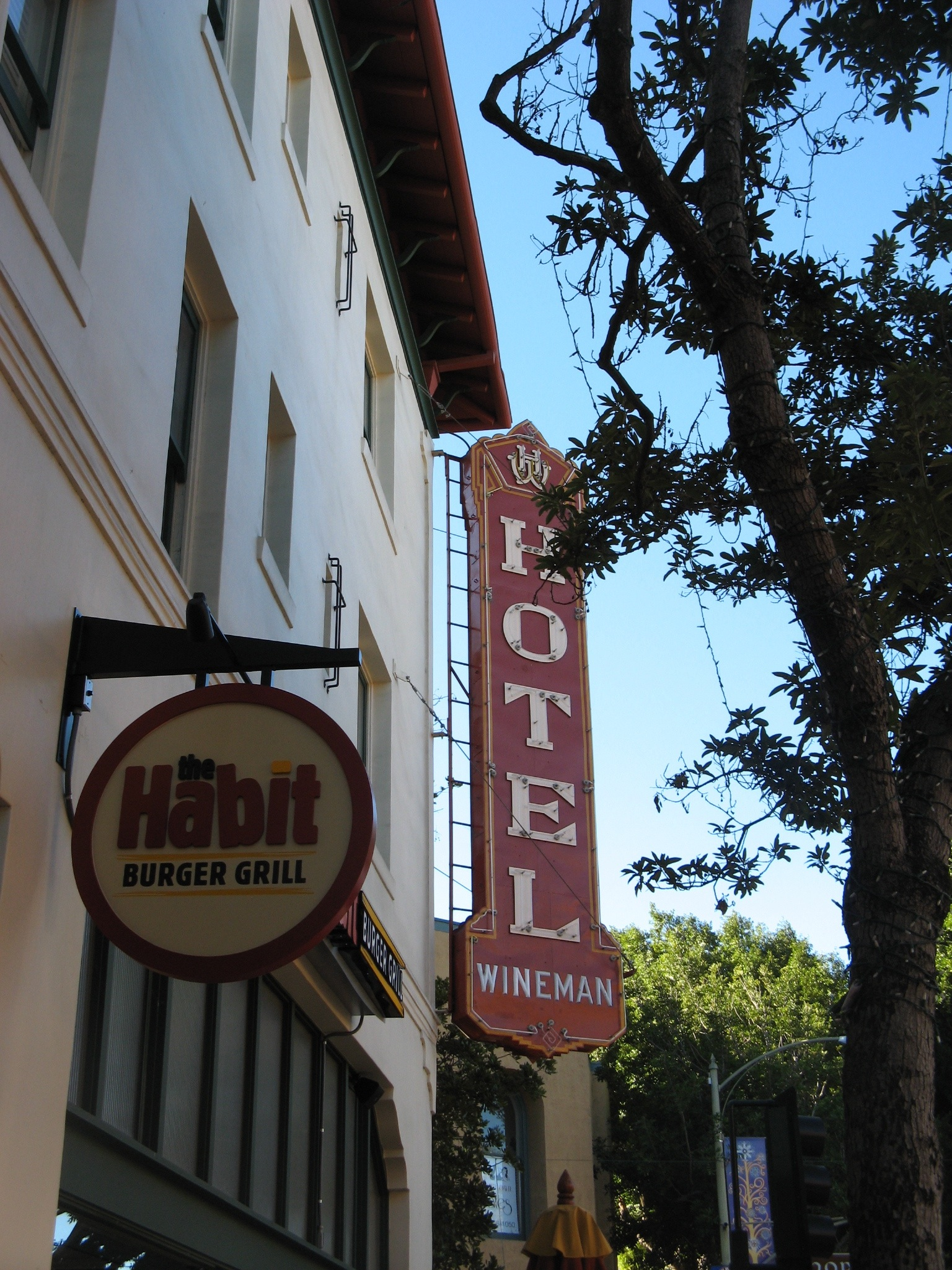
Historic Wineman Hotel

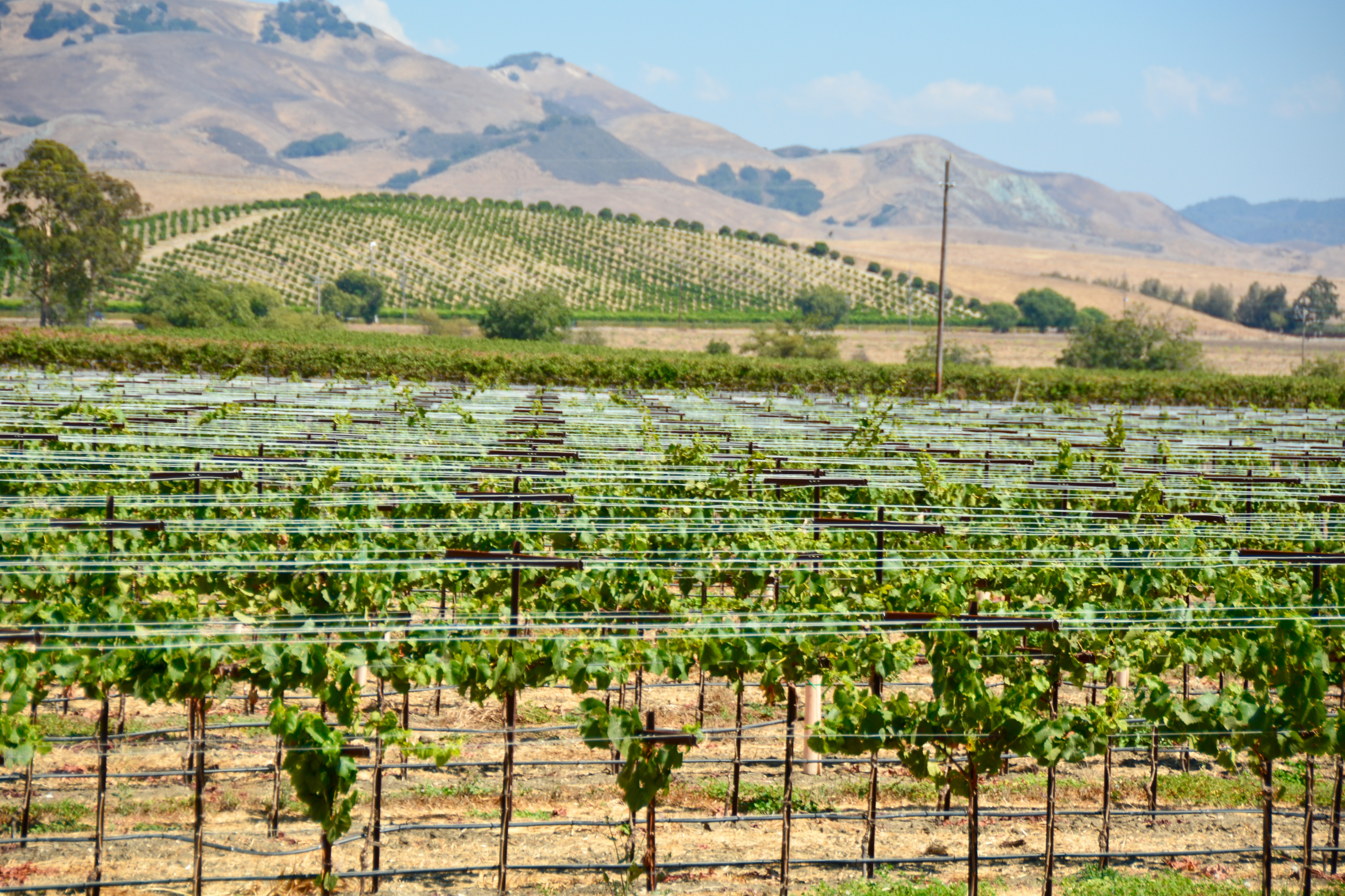
San Luis Obispo is a popular tourist destination as part of the Californian Central Coast wine region.

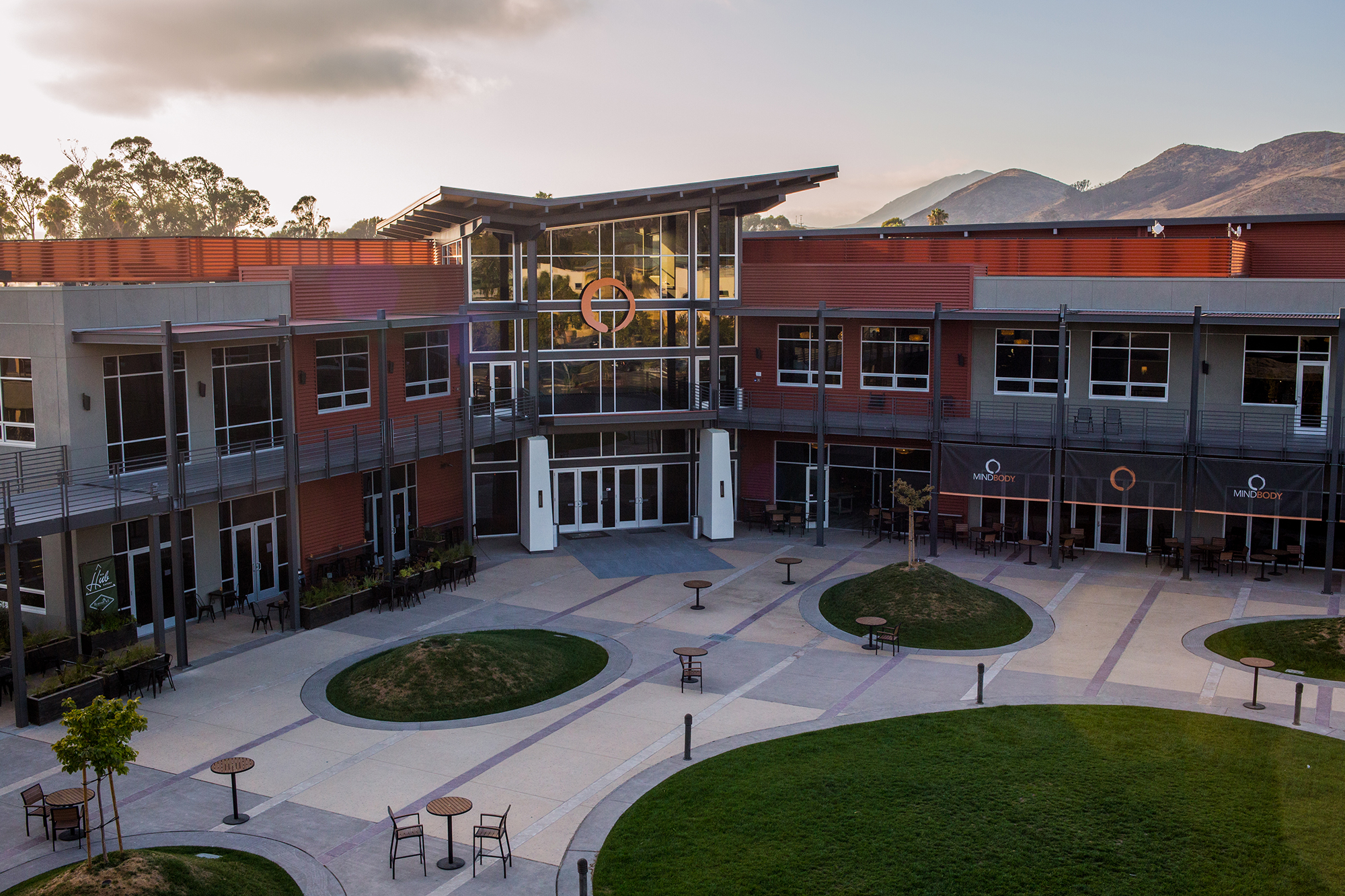
Mindbody Inc. headquarters

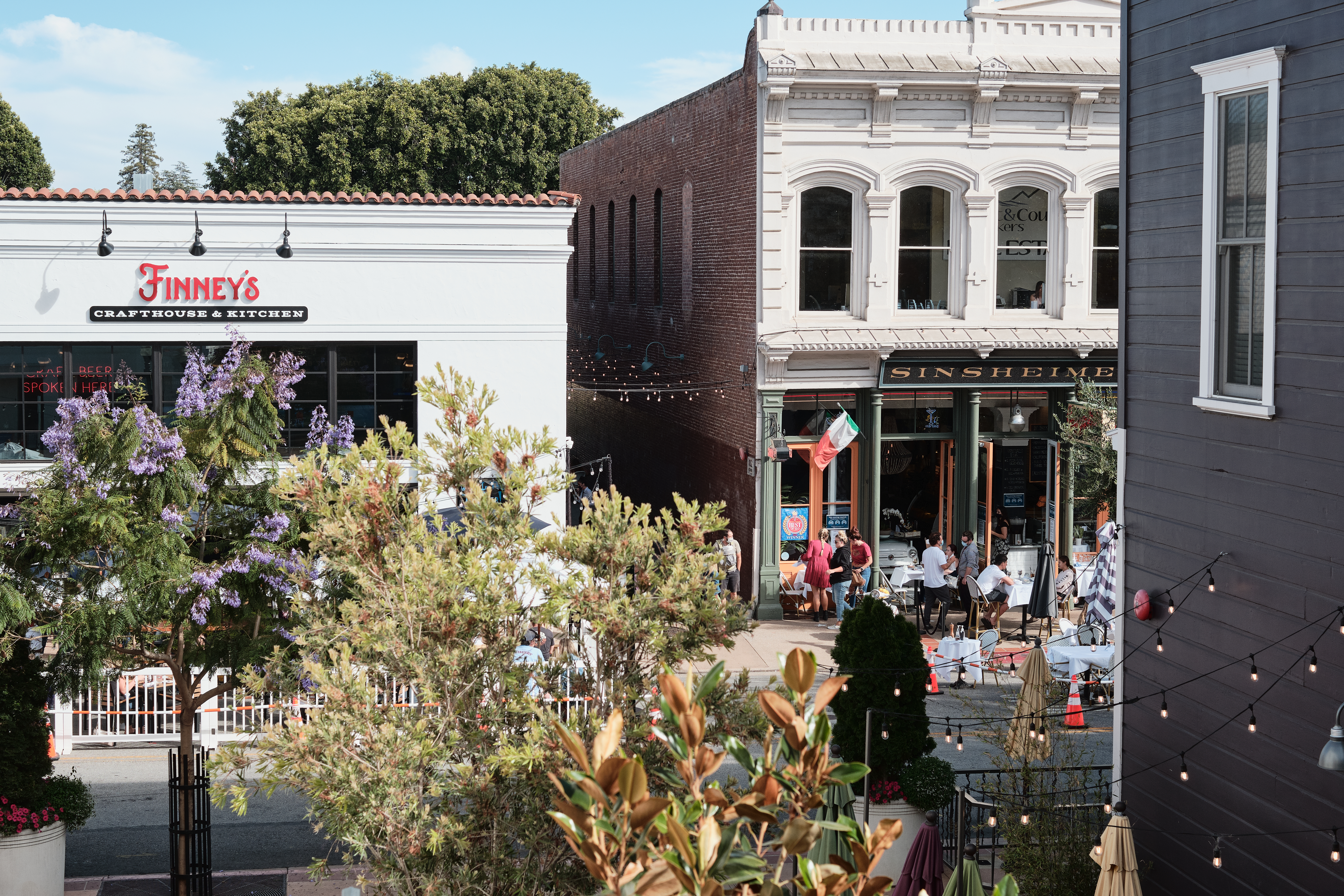
Restaurants in downtown San Luis

Union 76, San Luis Obispo, photographed by John Margolies in 1977

=== Top employers ===
According to the city's 2025 Annual Comprehensive Financial Report, the top employers in the city are:

#	Employer	Employees
1	California Polytechnic State University	3,177
2	County of San Luis Obispo	2,956
3	Cal Poly Corporation	2,787
4	Pacific Gas and Electric (Diablo Canyon)	1,824
5	California Men's Colony	1,350
6	San Luis Coastal Unified School District	1,070
7	Sierra Vista Regional Medical Center	779
8	Cuesta College	773
9	French Hospital Medical Center	688
10	City of San Luis Obispo	654

== Government ==
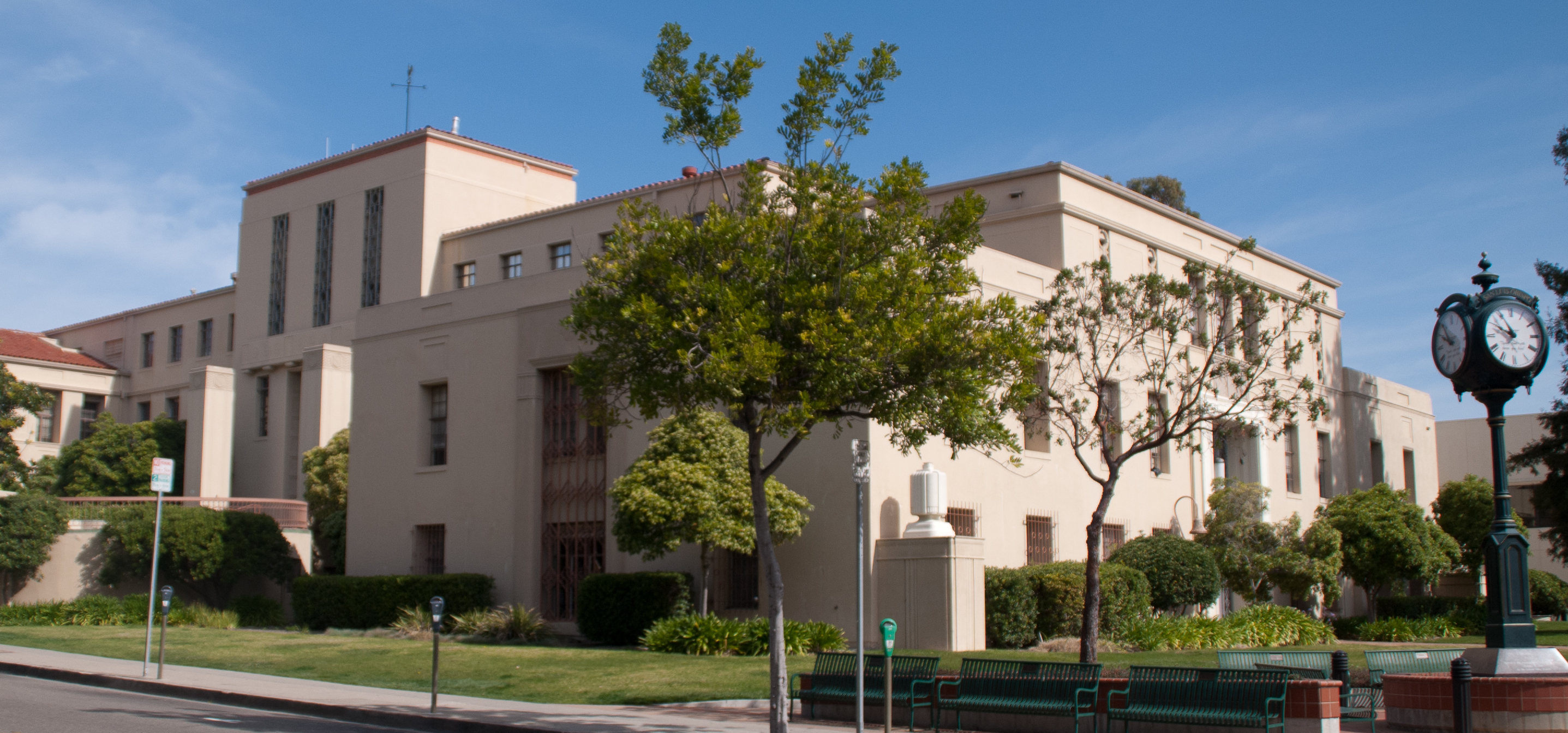
Built in 1940, the San Luis Obispo County Courthouse was designed by noted architects Walker & Eisen.

San Luis Obispo is incorporated as a charter city. It is also the county seat of San Luis Obispo County. The city charter provides for a "Council-Mayor-City Manager" form of municipal government. The city council has five members: a mayor who is elected to two-year terms, with each mayor limited to serving no more than four consecutive terms, and four city council members who are elected to four-year terms, with each council member limited to serving no more than two consecutive terms.

The fire department of San Luis Obispo was first organized in 1872 and now has 45 full-time firefighters and four fire stations (as of 2007). The SLO City Fire Stations are staffed with three-man ALS engine companies and a four-man ALS Truck company. Each apparatus has at least one paramedic on duty each day. The department responds to over 4,500 calls each year. The San Luis Obispo City Fire Department also maintains a bike medic program which is used at the Farmers' Market and other special events throughout the city. Four members of the Fire Department are also on the San Luis Obispo SWAT Team as SWAT Medics and respond using Squad 1 (an ALS equipped ambulance which also carries some light rescue gear and other specialty tools) The front-line members of the department are represented by the San Luis Obispo City Firefighters' IAFF Local 3523.

The City of San Luis Obispo Utilities Department can trace its lineage back to 1872 when plans were made to provide the city with safe drinking water. Currently the Utilities Department operates a water treatment plant designed to treat 16 million gallons a day, the Whale Rock Reservoir located in Cayucos, CA, a water distribution system including 15 pressure zones and 150 miles of water mains. The Water Resource Recovery Facility treats 4.5 million gallons per day and is currently undergoing a plant upgrade expected to be completed in 2021.

=== Notable ordinances ===
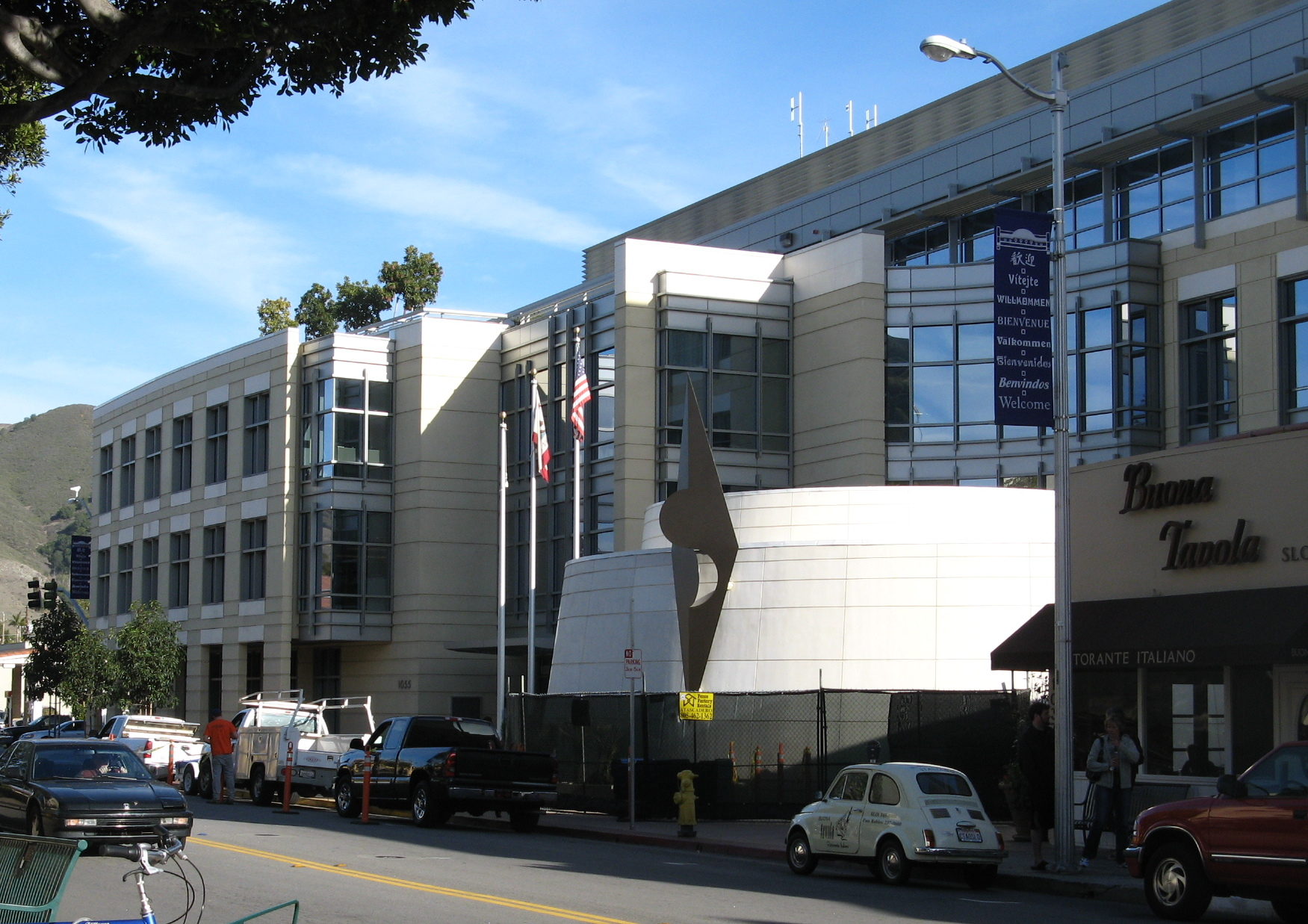
The County Government Center

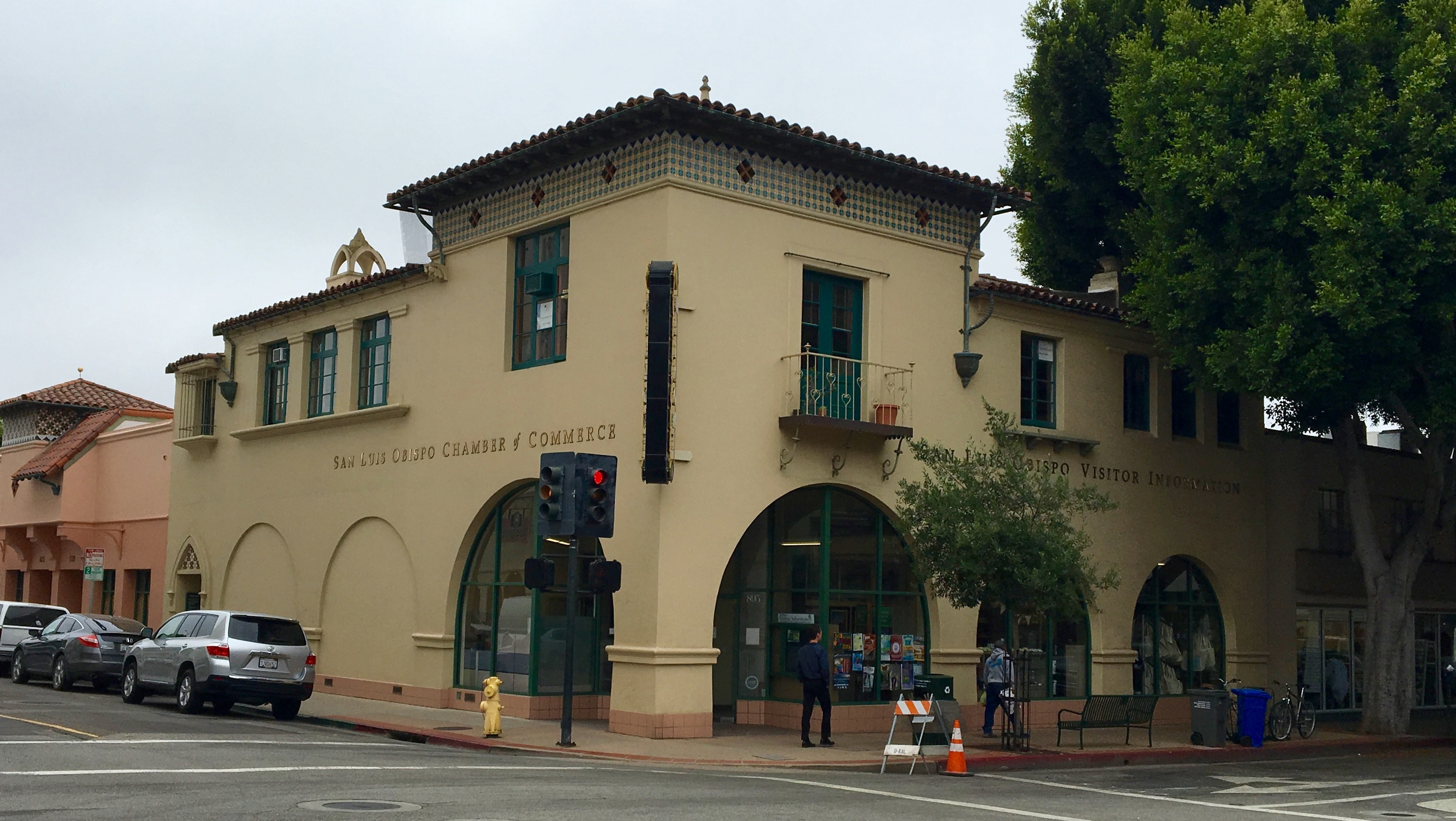
San Luis Obispo Chamber of Commerce, located in downtown

In June 1990 City Councilman Jerry Reiss proposed a city ordinance to ban smoking in all indoor public areas. Following a failed effort by R. J. Reynolds Tobacco Company to defeat the ordinance, the City Council voted 4–1 in favor on June 19, 1990, with only Mayor Ron Dunin dissenting. As a result, on August 2, 1990, San Luis Obispo became the first municipality in the world to ban smoking in all public buildings, including bars and restaurants. This statute has been a catalyst worldwide in anti-smoking legislation. In April 2010, San Luis Obispo strengthened its anti-smoking legislation, making smoking in public, excepting for certain conditions, a citable offense beginning on June 20, 2010.

In 1982, following public hearings, the city council approved an ordinance forbidding the construction of "drive-through" businesses. In-N-Out Burger opened a restaurant in the nearby town of Atascadero because of the ban. In 2008 the City Council voted 3–2 to keep the ban.

In April 2010, an "unruly gathering" ordinance passed with a vote of 4–1. This ordinance poses a fine of $700 for the hosts of gatherings with more than 20 people on private property that create a substantial disturbance in a significant amount of the neighborhood. Unlawful conduct includes excessive noise; public drunkenness; serving alcohol to minors; fighting; urinating in public; crowds overflowing into yards, sidewalks, or streets; or similar unlawful behaviors.

=== State and federal representation ===
In the California State Legislature, San Luis Obispo is in the 17th senatorial district, represented by Democrat John Laird, and in the 30th Assembly district, represented by Democrat Dawn Addis.

In the United States House of Representatives, San Luis Obispo is in California's 24th congressional district, represented by Democrat Salud Carbajal.

== Education ==
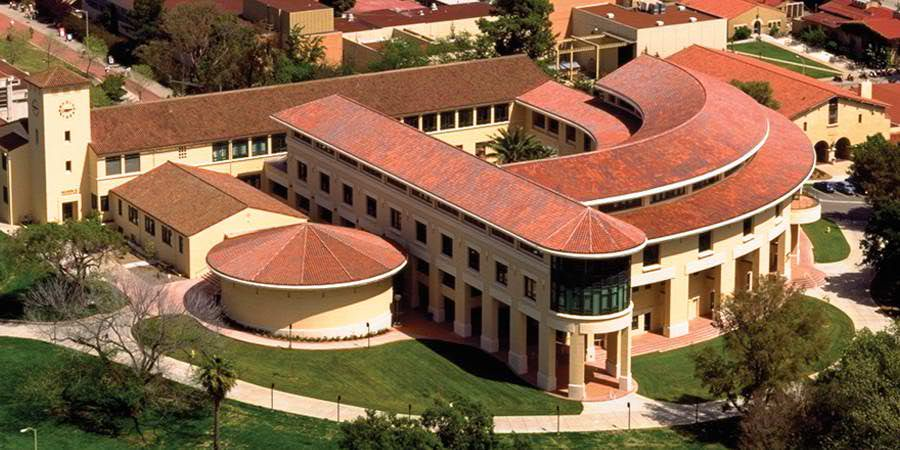
California Polytechnic State University, San Luis Obispo

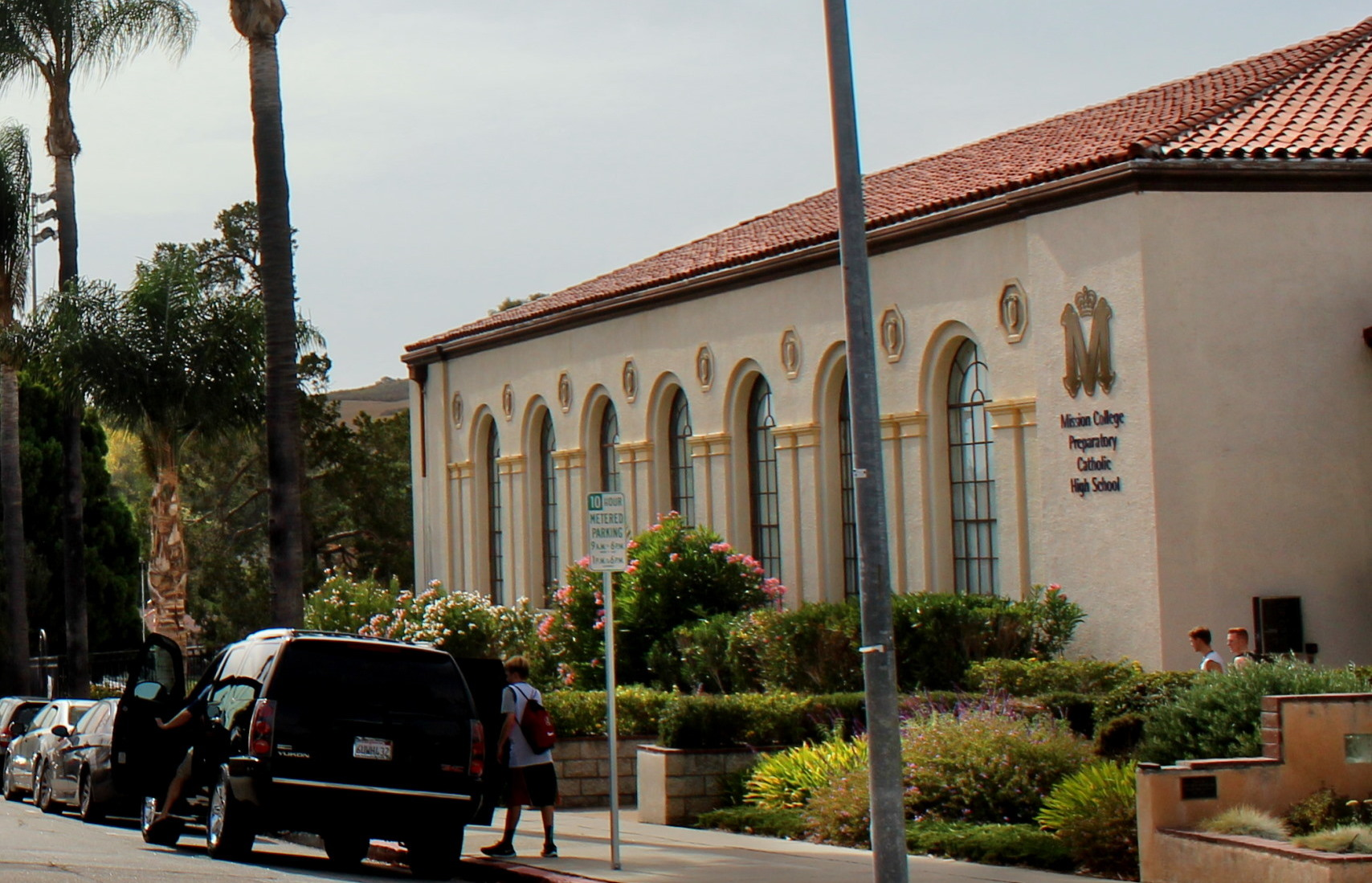
Mission College Prep. School

All public K–12 institutions in San Luis Obispo are operated by San Luis Coastal Unified School District, which contains six elementary schools, one middle school (Laguna Middle School), and one high school, San Luis Obispo High School. The district also operates several schools outside of San Luis Obispo in nearby Avila Beach, Edna Valley, Morro Bay, and Los Osos. Additionally, Mission College Preparatory Catholic High School and Old Mission School (est. 1876 as The Academy of the Immaculate Heart of Mary) operate privately within the Diocese of Monterey.

California Polytechnic State University (Cal Poly), a public university enrolling 21,497 students as of fall 2023, is just outside city limits, It has a postal address stating "San Luis Obispo, CA". in an unincorporated area and census-designated place, and provides on-campus housing for nearly 6,000 freshmen and sophomores.

The area is also served by Cuesta College, part of the California Community College System.

== Culture ==
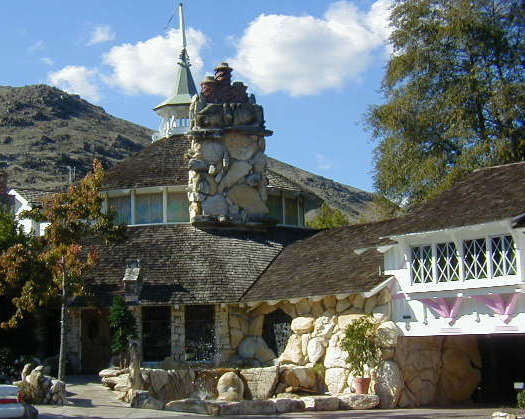
The Madonna Inn is one of San Luis Obispo's more famous landmarks.

The Madonna Inn is an eccentric landmark established by Alex Madonna in 1958. The Fremont Theater, a historic Art Deco theater from the 1940s, once played first-run movies on the huge screen, and now hosts stage performances. Murals adorn the walls of the main theater while neon swirls light the ceiling. The Palm Theatre boasts solar heating and is home to the San Luis Obispo International Film Festival. Since about 1960, people have been sticking chewed gum on the walls of Bubblegum Alley. The doctor's office on the corner of Santa Rosa and Pacific streets is one of very few commercial buildings designed by Frank Lloyd Wright. San Luis also has a Carnegie Library which is now home to the San Luis Obispo County Historical Museum.

The "underground city" is a series of tunnels beneath the city.

One of the largest Mardi Gras parades west of the Mississippi was held in San Luis Obispo, but canceled in 2005 because of difficulties related to crowd control and alcohol consumption.

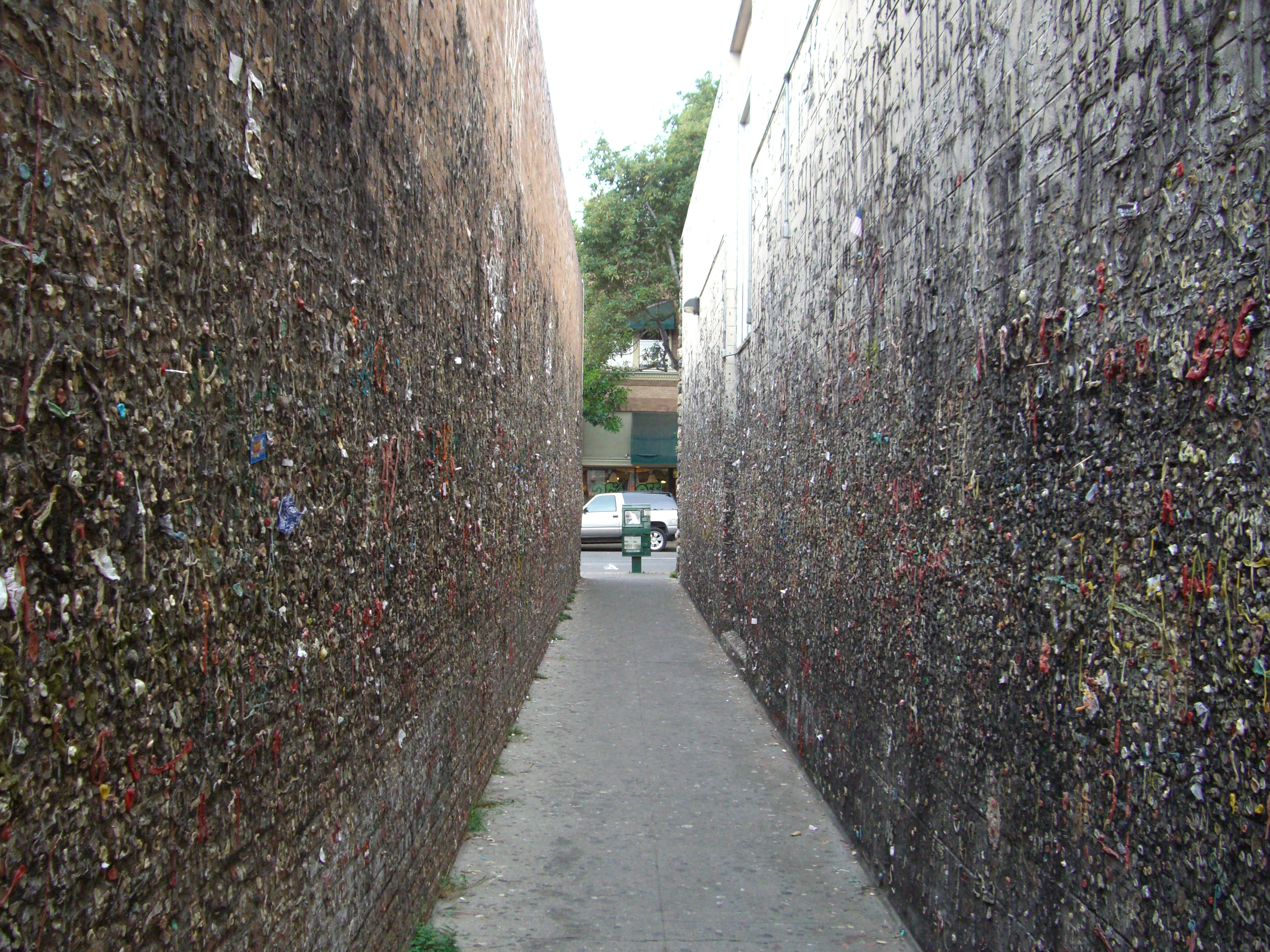
The infamous Bubblegum Alley in downtown San Luis Obispo

Cal Poly's open house, Poly Royal, was held annually from 1933 to 1990, though canceled in 1945 due to war rationing. It began as a show-and-tell for students to display their projects. It traces its origins to the 1904 Farmer's Institute and Picnic Basket. By the 1980s, as the college became "the most popular ... university in the 19-campus CSU system", Poly Royal began drawing over 100,000 people from throughout the state, including 126,000 people in 1985. Concerts, parties, and other entertainment were added and it earned $3–4 million in revenue for the city every year.

San Luis Obispo has been home of several other events, including a stop on the way of the Olympic Flame Relay, the Tour of California bicycle race, Cinco de Mayo celebrations, and a long-standing Christmas Parade. In May, the Madonna Hotel hosts the annual California Festival of Beers, which includes beer tasting of over 200 craft beers. Another attraction is the development of Edna Valley into a well-known wine region. Just south of the city, people can spend an afternoon wine tasting several wineries in the area with a very short drive. The wine region extends north beyond Paso Robles (30 miles north) and south to Santa Ynez (70 miles south).

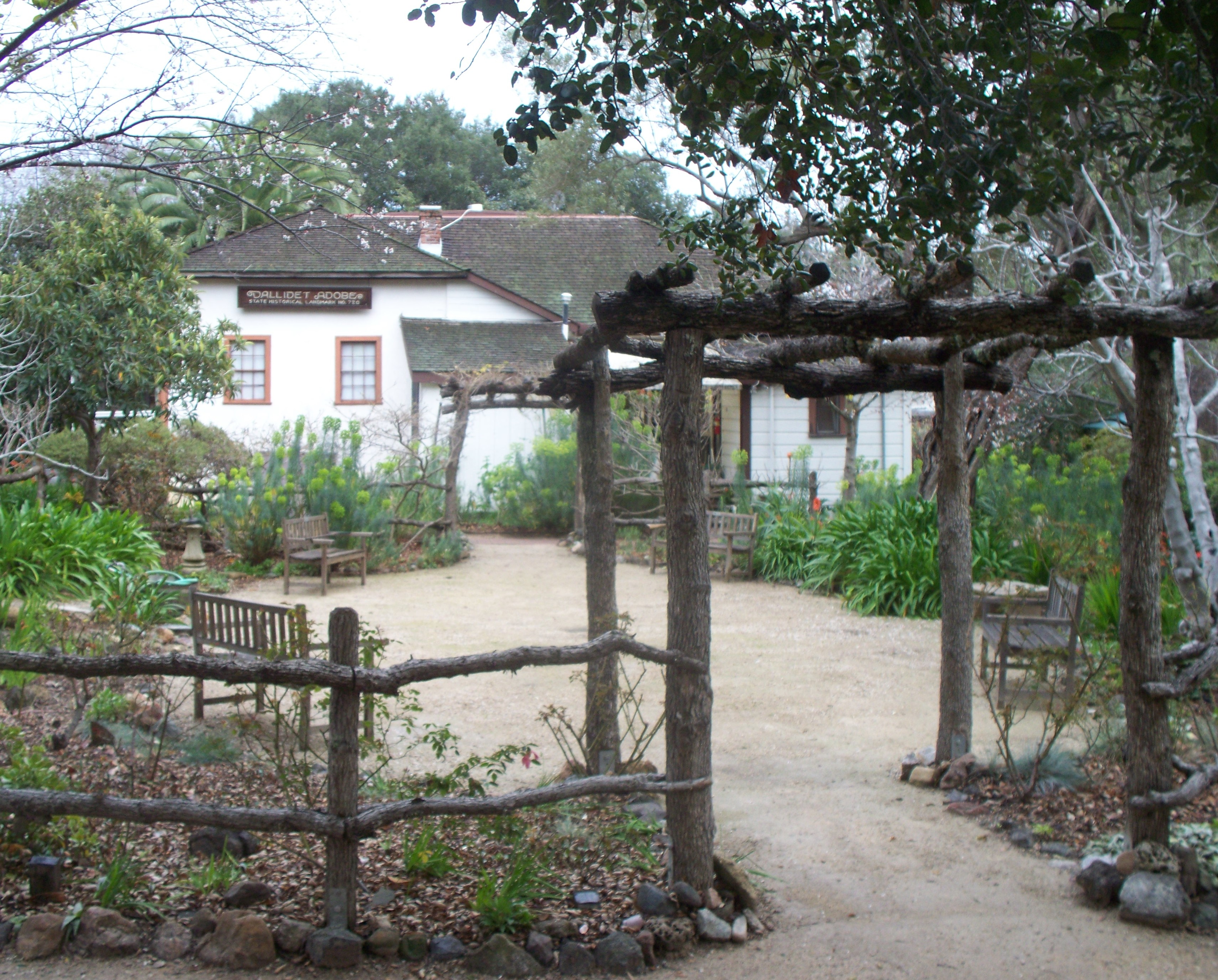
The Dallidet Adobe, built in 1856, is one of the oldest residences in town.

During summer months, a free outdoor concert Friday evening is called Concerts in the Plaza. Other noteworthy events include the San Luis Obispo International Film Festival, Festival Mozaic, a classical and crossover music festival, and the Plein Air Festival.

Every Thursday night San Luis Obispo hosts a farmers' market. Five blocks of Higuera St are blocked off to allow vendors to sell food and goods and various visual and music artists perform.

Since June 2000, the first Thursday of every month is The Bike Happening (also known as Bike Nite) in San Luis Obispo. People gather at the Mission Plaza with their bikes. The bikers go around on multiple circuits on the main streets of downtown.

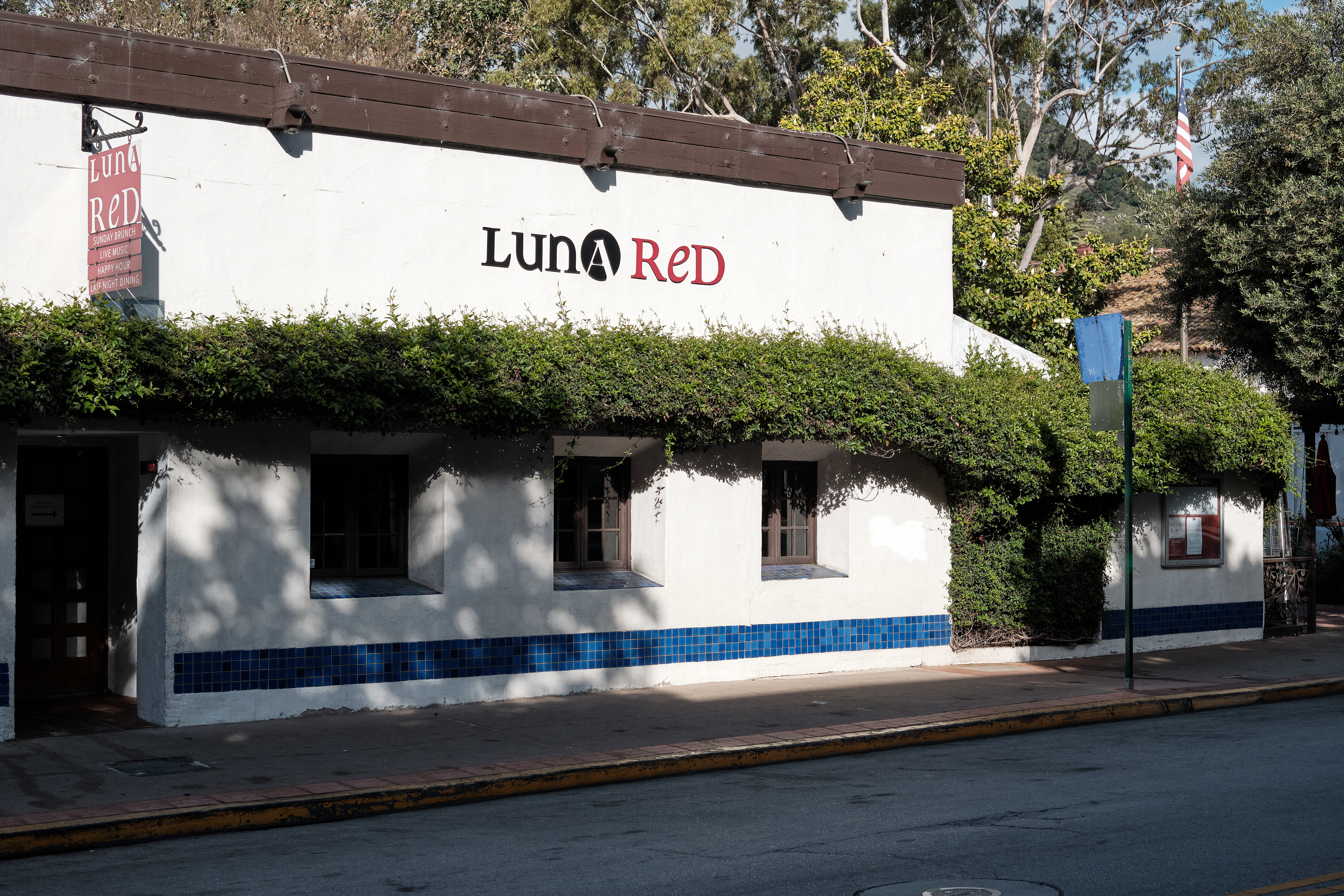
Restaurant in downtown San Luis

One of the cultural focal centers of San Luis Obispo is the Christopher Cohan Performing Arts Center built on the Cal Poly campus, which was constructed utilizing the donations of local businesses and individuals. The Performing Arts Center consists of multiple venues, including the original Spanos Theatre. The largest venue, Harmon Hall, seats 1,300. Many high school and college programs are scheduled. Local artists perform plays, music and dance. The addition of the Performing Arts Center attracts many touring performances which are usually not found in communities of comparable size to San Luis Obispo. The summer of 2007 was the opening concert of the Forbes Pipe Organ, which was built elevated into a side wall of Harmon Hall and required the donation of a further $3 million for purchase and installation.

The San Luis Obispo Museum of Art began in the 1950s when a small group of artists, educators and enthusiasts established the foundation. Over the years, the San Luis Obispo Art Association evolved into the San Luis Obispo Art Center, which evolved into the San Luis Obispo Museum of Art. The museum, with a focus on California Contemporary Art, shows 24 exhibitions per year, has both adult and children's art classes, and hosts art talks, films and other events. The museum launched a $15 million Capital Campaign for a new building in 2017.

=== Historic buildings and districts ===
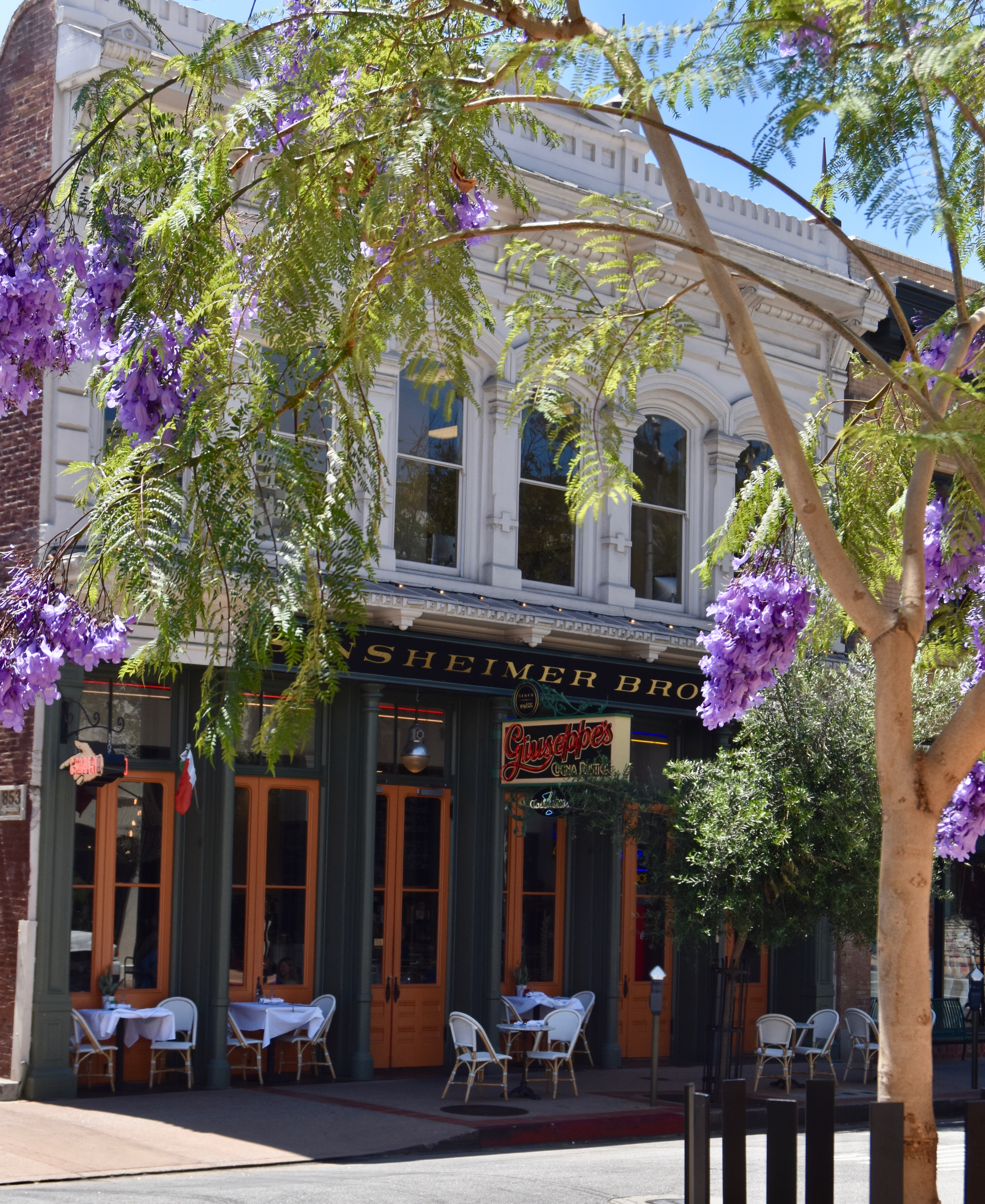
Downtown Historic District

San Luis Obispo has more than 180 historic buildings that have been designated as City of San Luis Obispo Historic Resources. Three of the city's designated historic resources have also been designated as California Historic Landmarks, including Mission San Luis Obispo de Tolosa, the Dallidet Adobe, and Ah Louis Store. In addition, National Register of Historic Places sites include the Myron Angel House, the Pacific Coast Railway Company Grain Warehouse, Robert Jack House, the Tribune-Republic Building, San Luis Obispo Carnegie Library, the Ah Louis Store, and William Shipsey House. The Carnegie Library is home to the San Luis Obispo County Historical Museum which includes a research center with information on the city's other historical resources.

The city also has five designated historic districts as follows:

- Downtown Historic District – Covers 61.5 acres (24.9 ha) generally bounded by Palm Street to the north, Marsh Street to the south, Osos Street to the east, and Nipomo Street to the west, plus Dana Street in the northwest. The Downtown Historic District covers the oldest part of the city, including the Mission San Luis Obispo de Tolosa and many commercial structures from the city's boom era from the 1890s to the 1910s.
- Chinatown Historic District – Covers 4.4 acres (1.8 ha) along both sides of Palm Street between Chorro and Morro Streets. Established in 1995 to recognize the contributions of the city's Chinese community. Two historical storefronts face Palm Street; Ah Louis Store and Mee Heng Low.
- Old Town Historic District – Covers 86 acres (35 ha) generally bounded by Pacific Street on the north, Islay Street on the south, Santa Rosa Street on the east, and Beach Street on the west. Established in 1987, the district is located in the city's oldest residential neighborhoods with historic homes dating from the 1880s to the turn of the century.
- Mill Street Historic District – Covers 20 acres (8.1 ha) from Peach Street on the north, Palm Street on the south, Pepper Street on the east and Toro Street on the west Established in 1987, the area consists of early 20th century homes in the Tudor Revival, Craftsman, Mission Revival, Prairie Colonial, and Shingle styles. Sometimes referred to as Fremont Heights.
- Railroad Historic District – Covers 80.7 acres (32.7 ha) bounded by the railroad right-of-way on the east, Johnson Avenue on the north, Orcutt Road on the south, Leff Street on the northwest, and Broad Street on the west. Established in 1998 along the historic boundaries of the Southern Pacific rail yard. It includes residential and commercial resources constructed following the arrival of the Southern Pacific Railroad in 1894.

== Media ==
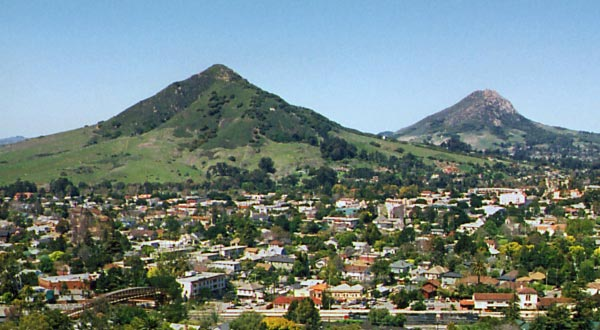
View of San Luis Obispo with Cerro San Luis (left) and Bishop Peak (right), two of the Nine Sisters

=== Television ===
The following TV stations broadcast from San Luis Obispo:

- KEYT 3, a trio ABC/CBS/MNTV television affiliate based in Santa Barbara; seen on K31KE-D Channel 31 in San Luis Obispo
- KSBY 6, an NBC television affiliate; licensed to and broadcast from San Luis Obispo
- KKFX 24, a FOX television affiliate; licensed to San Luis Obispo studios broadcast from Telemundo affiliate KCOY in Santa Maria.
- KTAS 33, a TeleXitos affiliate; broadcast from San Luis Obispo

=== Radio ===
- KVEC "News/Talk"
- KYNS "Alt 93.7"
- KKJL "K-Jewell"
- KLFF "Family Life Radio"
- KCBX "Central Coast Public Radio"
- KCPR "Cal Poly Radio"
- KZOZ "Classic Rock"
- KXTZ "The Beach"
- KSLY "K-LOVE"
- KKJG "K-JUG"
- KERW "Eclectic 24"
- KLUN "Radio Lazer"
- KWWV "Wild 106.1"

== Transportation ==
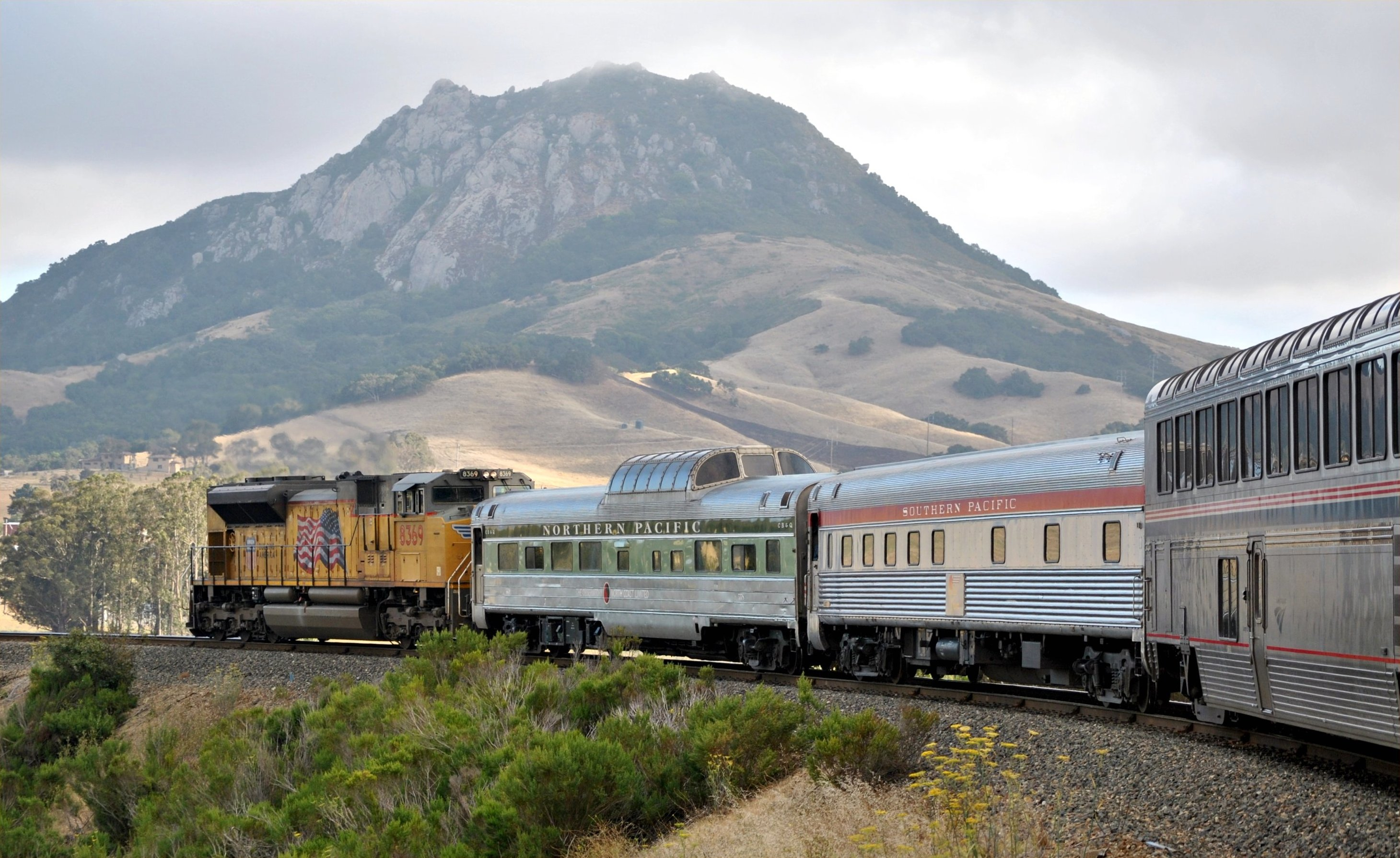
Amtrak's Coast Starlight passing in front of one of the Nine Morros

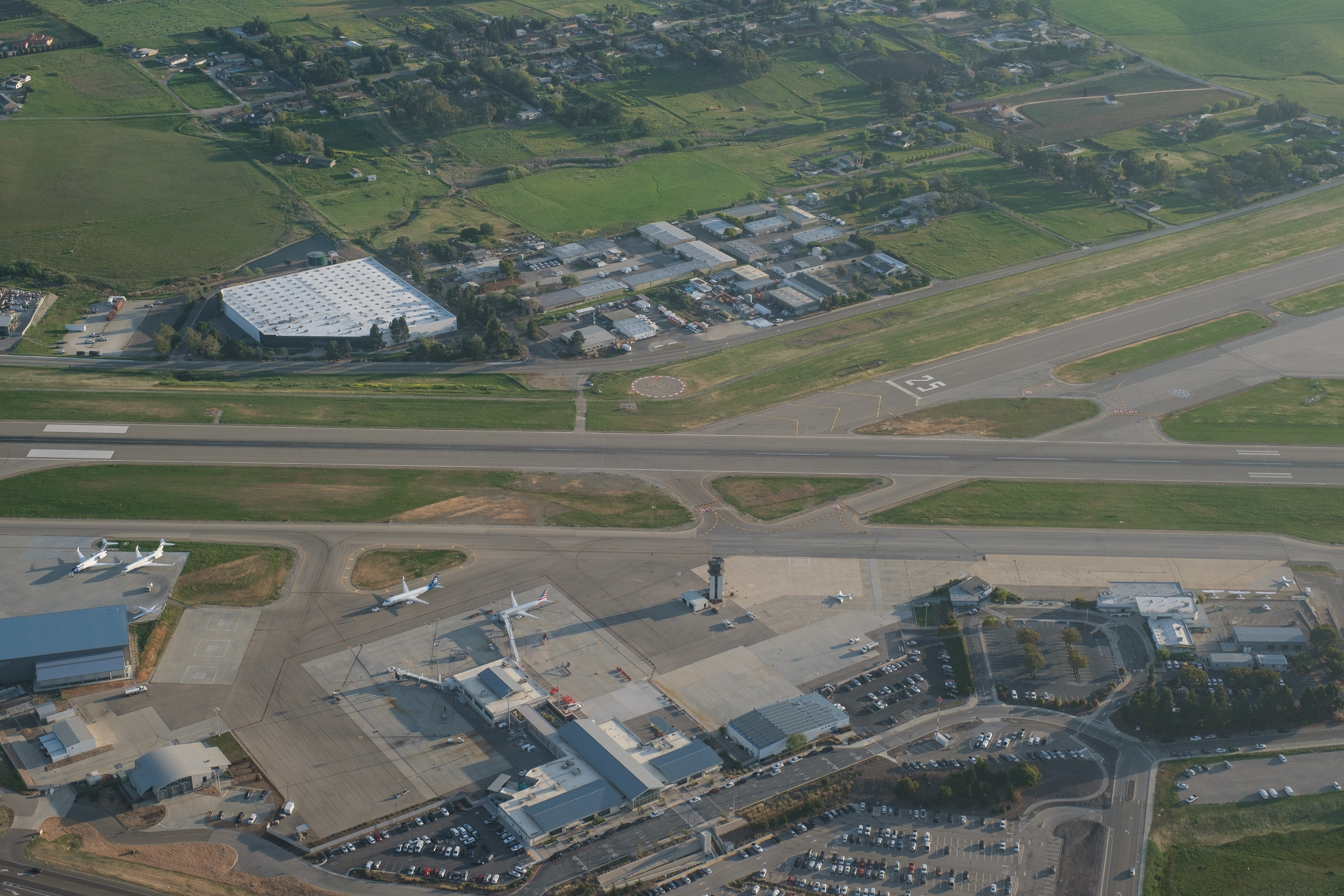
San Luis Obispo Regional Airport

San Luis Obispo County Regional Airport offers private air service and non-stop commercial air service to San Francisco, Los Angeles, Seattle, Denver, and Phoenix, Dallas-Fort Worth, Las Vegas, and service to Portland and San Diego, beginning in 2020.

Amtrak provides daily rail transport service at San Luis Obispo station as the northern terminus of the Pacific Surfliner line from San Diego and Los Angeles Union Station, and as a stop on the Coast Starlight line. The Amtrak train travels north to Salinas, San Jose, Oakland, San Francisco (via Emeryville), Sacramento, Portland, and Seattle.

Amtrak Thruway 18 provides a daily connection to Visalia on the east, and Santa Maria on the west, with several stops in between.

Greyhound closed its station building in San Luis Obispo on March 12, 2009; it still serves the city via a bus stop on Railroad Avenue. There are also multiple companies that provide shuttle services or black car service to/from the airport.

FlixBus boards from the San Luis Obispo Railroad Museum at 1940 Santa Barbara Avenue.

=== Public transit ===
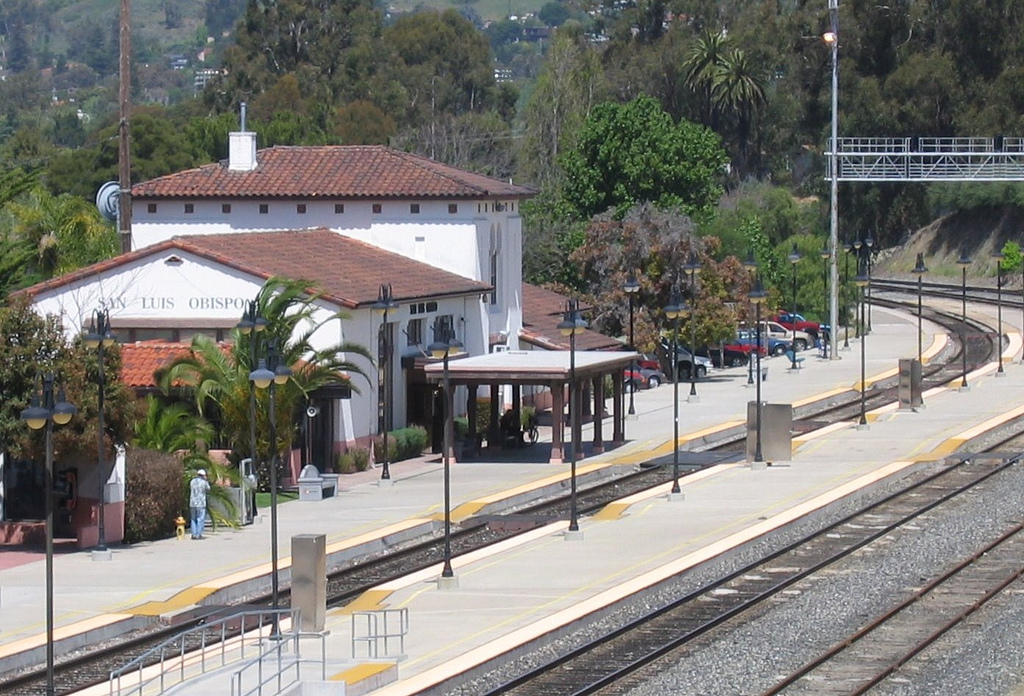
The San Luis Obispo train station is served by Amtrak, with the Pacific Surfliner and Coast Starlight lines.

Public transit includes the citywide SLO Transit bus lines as well as the county-wide SLO Regional Transit system. Rideshare encourages the use of the local public transit, as well as carpooling and cycling. Riders for the SLO Transit system are now able to plan their trips using Google Transit. The SLO Car Free program provides an online one-stop-shop for all car-free vacationing needs from bus schedules and bike maps, to discounts on transportation, lodging, and attractions.

=== Roads ===
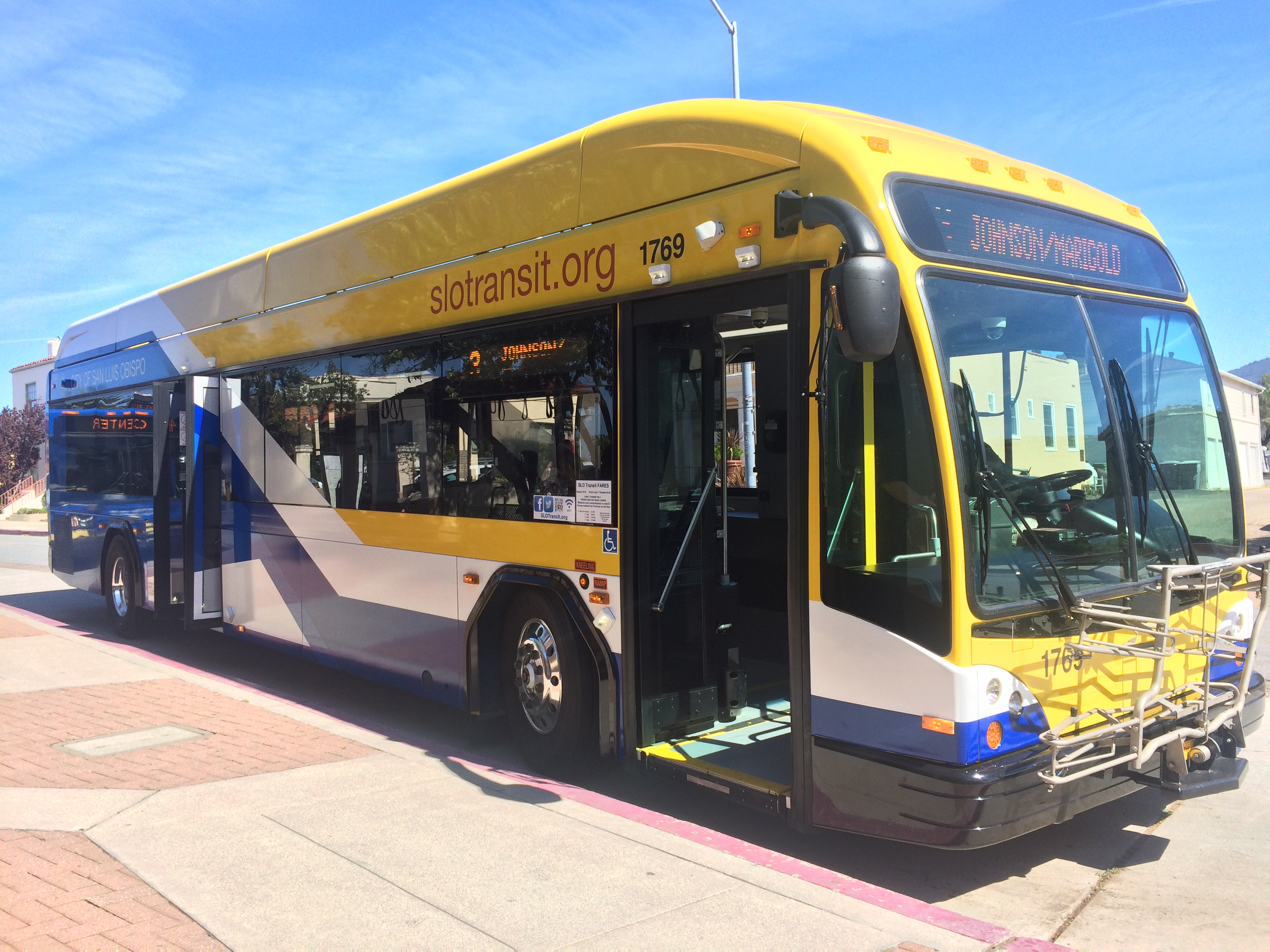
SLO Transit bus

U.S. Route 101 and California State Route 1 are the major north–south highways in San Luis Obispo, linking the city to the rest of the Central Coast region, San Francisco to the north, and Los Angeles to the south. Both enter the city from the south as a concurrency. As they head north, Highway 1 then splits towards the coast to Morro Bay, while Highway 101 stays more inland to Atascadero and Paso Robles. California State Route 227 provides an alternate route to Highway 101 from San Luis Obispo south to Arroyo Grande.

=== Cycling ===
Bicycling is increasing as a mode of transportation. The Bill Roalman (Morro Street) Bicycle Boulevard, also called the Bill Roalman Greenway, gives priority to bicycle traffic while a special bicycle traffic signal (one of only a handful in the United States) allows bicyclists their own phase in traffic flow. The SLO County Bicycle Coalition offers a free bicycle valet service during the weekly Farmers' Market. In 2007, the city was designated as a Bicycle Friendly Community at the Gold level by the League of American Bicyclists.
