= Takken's Shoes =

- Type: Private
- Industry: Retail
- Founded: 1937
- Founder: Harry Takken
- Headquarters: San Luis Obispo, California, United States
- Number of locations: 2
- Products: Shoes
- Website: www.takkens.shoes

Takken's Shoes is an independent shoe retailer with two stores in California, United States, and two retail websites (Takkens.com and Takkens.shoes). Specializing in comfort and family footwear, Takken's Shoes is also one of the largest UGG Australia retailers in the world. The corporate headquarters are located in San Luis Obispo, California, where the first Takken's Shoes was opened in 1937 by Harry Takken as a shoe repair business.

== History ==
Takken's shoes opened in 1937 as a shoe repair shop in San Luis Obispo, California. The business was successful as such (largely attributed to Harry's customer service and charisma), and was purchased by Harry's son Robert in 1971. In 1975 Robert expanded the business to include a retail component, adding western and work boots. In the mid 1980s Robert jumped on the new 'Comfort Shoe' trend, and again expanded the business adding several popular comfort brands of the time. At one time, Takken's Shoes of San Luis Obispo was the largest independent Rockport dealer on the west coast. The retail offering expanded again in the 80's with the addition of UGG Australia and other sheepskin footwear.

In 1987 a second store was opened in Paso Robles, California. The Paso Robles store is the oldest free-standing location currently in the corporation and one of two still offering shoe repair services (the San Luis Obispo Takken's Location is the other). Both the San Luis Obispo and Paso Robles stores are still widely remembered for their western boot selection that began the retail side of the company. The Thousand Oaks location opened in 1989, marking a number of changes for Takken's Shoes. As well as being the first Takken's Shoes to open outside of San Luis Obispo County and the first mall location, the Thousand Oaks store was opened under the name "The Comfort Zone" marking what would eventually be a permanent shift towards comfort footwear.

The 1990s saw continued growth with the addition of 9 new comfort oriented stores. Beginning with the Santa Maria location, expansion continued into malls in Newark, Hayward, Tracy, Beverly Hills, Richmond, Salinas, Citrus Heights, and Fairfield (in order of opening). Since the beginning of the 2000s, 17 new mall locations have opened in Ventura, Lakewood, Concord, Bakersfield, Roseville, Downey, Stockton, Fresno, San Jose, Visalia, San Bruno, Merced, Palmdale, Escondido, Pleasanton, and Valencia, and 1 new freestanding location in Roseville. The company has closed the Beverly Hills, Downey, Tracy, and Richmond locations, and remodeled 7 of its oldest locations in the recent years. The company intends to continue expansion, with plans for an additional free standing location in Santa Maria as well as an undisclosed number of new California mall locations before the decade is out.

The expansion of the 1990s was accelerated by Robert's sons Cris and Marc Takken joining the company full-time. Cris Takken, now the Vice President of Operations, began in the shoe business at 13 years of age polishing shoes and working part-time in the original San Luis Obispo location. Cris went on to manage the company's Newark location, and later became the General Manager of Takken's Shoes. As the Vice President of Operations, Cris has implemented a series of employee guide lines and training programs to insure the customer service legacy of the company's founder. He has spearheaded the expansion and remodel projects, and maintained steady sales increases (undisclosed) since taking on the position. Marc Takken, now the Vice President of Merchandising, also began on the sales floor of the San Luis Obispo location while in highschool, and went on to manage the Hayward, Tracy, and Beverly Hills locations. Marc has used his position as the Vice President of Merchandising to implement a complex customized inventory plan for each of the company's locations to appeal to the individual needs of each store's community. Takken's Shoes' continues to be family owned and operated and has no current plans to become publicly traded.

== Products and services ==
Takken's Shoes is primarily a comfort shoe retailer, as well as one of the largest UGG Australia retailers in the world. Their product inventory is individualized for each location. Company wide, Takken's Shoes carries a variety of comfort shoes, fashion shoes, skate shoes, work boots, children's shoes, slippers, sandals, accessories, and orthotics from a variety of vendors.
