= List of museums in the California Central Coast =

The California Central Coast is an area roughly spanning the area between the Monterey Bay extending through Santa Cruz County, San Benito County, Monterey County, San Luis Obispo County, Santa Barbara County and Ventura County.

This is a list of museums, defined for this context as institutions (including nonprofit organizations, government entities, and private businesses) that collect and care for objects of cultural, artistic, scientific, or historical interest and make their collections or related exhibits available for public viewing. Also included are non-profit and university art galleries. Museums that exist only in cyberspace (i.e., virtual museums) are not included.

To use the sortable tables: click on the icons at the top of each column to sort that column in alphabetical order; click again for reverse alphabetical order.

== Museums ==
Name	Image	Town/City	County	Region	Type	Summary
Agricultural History Project Center & Museum		Watsonville	Santa Cruz	Monterey Bay	Agriculture	website, located at the entrance to the Santa Cruz County Fairgrounds, tools, plows, tractors and implements of yesterday's farming, operated by the Agricultural History Project
Agriculture Museum of Ventura County		Santa Paula	Ventura	Central Coast	Agriculture	website, history, people, crops, and technologies of agriculture in the county
Albinger Archaeological Museum		Ventura	Ventura	Central Coast	Archaeology	website, information, operated by the city of Ventura
Alvarado Gallery		Monterey	Monterey	Monterey Bay	Art	website, city's art exhibits gallery in the Monterey Conference Center
Aptos History Museum		Aptos	Santa Cruz	Monterey Bay	Local history	website
Art, Design & Architecture Museum		Goleta	Santa Barbara	Central Coast	Art	Part of the University of California, Santa Barbara
Aviation Museum of Santa Paula		Santa Paula	Ventura	Central Coast	Aviation	website, includes different personal collections of antique, classic and experimental aircraft; automobiles including race cars; motorcycles; an enormous antique radio, juke box and phonograph collection; paintings and photographs; model aircraft and a variety of aviation artifacts
Bigfoot Discovery Museum		Felton	Santa Cruz	Monterey Bay	Entertainment	myths, legends and sightings of Bigfoot
Boronda History Center		Salinas	Monterey	Monterey Bay	Historic house	Operated by the Monterey County Historical Society, includes the Boronda Adobe
California Oil Museum		Santa Paula	Ventura	Central Coast	Industry	Local history and the history of the oil industry in California
Cabrillo College Gallery		Aptos	Santa Cruz	Monterey Bay	Art	website, part of Cabrillo College, hosts 12 exhibitions annually
CAF – So Cal Wing Aviation Museum		Camarillo	Ventura	Central Coast	Aviation	website, operated by Commemorative Air Force, Southern California Wing at Camarillo Airport
Camarillo Ranch		Camarillo	Ventura	Central Coast	Historic house	Queen Anne style Victorian home furnished to appear as from 1914 to the 1930s
Camp Roberts Historical Museum		Camp Roberts	Monterey	Monterey Bay	Military	website, history of the California National Guard post
Capitola Historical Museum		Capitola	Santa Cruz	Central Coast	Local history	website
Carmel Mission		Carmel-by-the-Sea	Monterey	Monterey Bay	History	Historic Roman Catholic mission church with several museums of local and mission history
Carnegie Art Museum		Oxnard	Ventura	Central Coast	Art	Collection of primarily 20th century California artists
Carpinteria Valley Museum of History		Carpinteria	Santa Barbara	Central Coast	Local history	
Carriage and Western Art Museum of Santa Barbara		Santa Barbara	Santa Barbara	Central Coast	Transportation	website, carriages, wagons, saddles
Casa de la Guerra		Santa Barbara	Santa Barbara	Central Coast	Historic house	Residence of the fifth commandant of the Presidio of Santa Barbara
Casa del Herrero		Montecito	Santa Barbara	Central Coast	Historic house	1920s estate, tours by appointment
Casa Dolores		Santa Barbara	Santa Barbara	Central Coast	Art	Popular arts of Mexico
Center for Photographic Art		Carmel	Monterey	Monterey Bay	Art	website, photography
Central Coast Veterans Memorial Museum		San Luis Obispo	San Luis Obispo	Central Coast	Military	website
Channel Islands Maritime Museum		Oxnard	Ventura	Central Coast	Maritime	website, maritime art, ship models dating back to 1622, local maritime history, art exhibits
Chumash Indian Museum		Thousand Oaks	Ventura	Central Coast	Native American	website
Colton Hall		Monterey	Monterey	Monterey Bay	Local history	
Conejo Valley Art Museum		Thousand Oaks	Ventura	Central Coast	Art	website
Conservation Corps State Museum		San Luis Obispo	San Luis Obispo	Central Coast	Military	History of the Civilian Conservation Corps in California
Couture Pattern Museum	Courtyard beneath the Couture Pattern Museum in Santa Barbara, CA. Plaza Linda Vista building.	Santa Barbara	Santa Barbara	Central Coast	Fashion History & Couture Sewing	Single-room venue, features rotating exhibits from its extensive collection of over a thousand rare haute couture patterns.
Dallidet Adobe		San Luis Obispo	San Luis Obispo	Central Coast	Historic house	website, 1850s adobe and gardens
Dana Adobe		Nipomo	San Luis Obispo	Central Coast	Historic house	
DigiBarn Computer Museum		Boulder Creek	Santa Cruz	Monterey Bay	Computer	Birth and evolution of personal, interactive computing, open by appointment
Dudley House Museum		Ventura	Ventura	Central Coast	Historic house	1892 Victorian farm house, operated by San Buenaventura Heritage
Eloise Pickard Smith Gallery		Santa Cruz	Santa Cruz	Monterey Bay	Art	website, part of Cowell College of the University of California, Santa Cruz, focus is art of the Monterey Bay region
Elverhoj Museum of History and Art		Solvang	Santa Barbara	Central Coast	Multiple	website, local history and art, Danish heritage and Danish-American pioneers
Estrella Warbird Museum		Paso Robles	San Luis Obispo	Central Coast	Aviation	Military aircraft and memorabilia, Woodland Auto Display
Fernald Mansion		Santa Barbara	Santa Barbara	Central Coast	Historic house	website, operated by the Santa Barbara Historical Association, Queen Anne-style Victorian home
Fillmore Historical Museum		Fillmore	Ventura	Central Coast	Open air	website, includes the 1905 Hinckley House, Rancho Sespe Bunk House, and Southern Pacific Railroad Depot
Grandma Prisbrey's Bottle Village		Simi Valley	Ventura	Central Coast	Art	Folk art "village" of shrines, walkways, sculptures, and buildings from recycled items
Guadalupe-Nipomo Dunes Center		Guadalupe	Santa Barbara	Central Coast	Local and Natural History	website, historic Craftsman bungalow with local and natural history exhibits about the Guadalupe-Nipomo Dunes, art gallery, artifacts from The Ten Commandments
Hans Christian Andersen Museum		Solvang	Santa Barbara	Central Coast	Biographical	website, life and works of Hans Christian Andersen
Hearst Castle		San Simeon	San Luis Obispo	Central Coast	Historic house	Palatial mansion, home of newspaper magnate William Randolph Hearst
History Center of San Luis Obispo		San Luis Obispo	San Luis Obispo	Central Coast	Local history	Changing exhibits of local history and culture
Jack House and Gardens		San Luis Obispo	San Luis Obispo	Central Coast	Historic house	Victorian period home
John Steinbeck House		Salinas	Monterey	Monterey Bay	Historic house	Victorian birthplace of author John Steinbeck, also a restaurant
Karpeles Manuscript Library Museum		Santa Barbara	Santa Barbara	Central Coast	Library	Changing exhibits from its literary and historic documents collections
kidSTREAM		Camarillo	Ventura	Central Coast	Children's	
La Purísima Mission State Historic Park		Lompoc	Santa Barbara	Central Coast	Open air	Includes restored mission church, shops, living quarters and blacksmith shop
Larkin House		Monterey	Monterey	Monterey Bay	Historic home	Home of Thomas O. Larkin.
Lompoc Museum		Lompoc	Santa Barbara	Central Coast	Local history	Chumash Indians, archeology and history of the Lompoc Valley and Santa Barbara County
Mission Nuestra Señora de la Soledad		Soledad	Monterey	Monterey Bay	History	Restored late 18th century Spanish mission
Mission San Antonio de Padua		Jolon	Monterey	Monterey Bay	History	Historic Roman Catholic mission church with museum of history and archeology of early California and Native American cultures
Mission San Buenaventura		Ventura	Ventura	Central Coast	History	Historic Roman Catholic mission church with museum of Chumash Indian artifacts and mission-era items
Mission San Luis Obispo		San Luis Obispo	San Luis Obispo	Central Coast	Religious	Changing exhibits of local history and culture
Mission San Miguel Arcángel		San Miguel	San Luis Obispo	Central Coast	Religious	Historic mission church, also contains a museum about the church's history
Mission Santa Barbara		Santa Barbara	Santa Barbara	Central Coast	Historic church	
Mission Santa Inés		Solvang	Santa Barbara	Central Coast	Historic church	
Monterey Bay Aquarium		Monterey	Monterey	Monterey Bay	Natural history	
Monterey County Agricultural and Rural Life Museum		King City	Monterey	Monterey Bay	Open air	website, includes the exhibit barn, blacksmith shop, and the History of Irrigation Museum, 1898 Spreckels House, 1887 schoolhouse, 1903 train depot
Monterey County Youth Museum		Monterey	Monterey	Monterey Bay	Children's	website
Monterey Museum of Art		Monterey	Monterey	Monterey Bay	Art	Collections specialize in American Art, particularly Monterey Peninsula and the West Coast, and Asian art
Monterey State Historic Park		Monterey	Monterey	Monterey Bay	Open air	10 historic buildings including the Old Customhouse, Larkin House, other historic house museums and a local history museum
Morro Bay State Park Museum of Natural History		Morro Bay	San Luis Obispo	Central Coast	Natural history	
Mullin Automotive Museum		Oxnard	Ventura	Central Coast	Automotive	Features French automobiles of the 1920s and 1930s, and French Art Deco furniture and decorative arts
Murphy Auto Museum		Oxnard	Ventura	Central Coast	Automotive	website, vintage automobiles and Americana, H/O scale train layouts
Museum of Handcar Technology		Marina	Monterey	Central Coast	Industry	website, Human powered railroad machines known as handcars
Museum of Art & History @ the McPherson Center		Santa Cruz	Santa Cruz	Monterey Bay	Multiple	Art, history of Santa Clara County, also known as the Santa Cruz Museum of Art & History
Museum of Monterey		Monterey	Monterey	Monterey Bay	Maritime	Operated by the Monterey History & Art Association
Museum of Ventura County		Ventura	Ventura	Central Coast	Multiple	website, Ventura County's history, art and culture
National Steinbeck Center		Salinas	Monterey	Monterey Bay	Biographical	Works and philosophy of author John Steinbeck, local history, art and cultural exhibits
Ojai Valley Museum		Ojai	Ventura	Central Coast	Multiple	Located in a former church, exhibits include local history and art, Native American baskets, pioneer tools, photographs, agriculture, oil
Old Monterey Jail		Monterey	Monterey	Monterey Bay	Jail	website, city jail used from 1854 to 1956
Olivas Adobe		Ventura	Ventura	Central Coast	Historic house	Mid 19th century adobe
Oxnard Historic Farm Park & Museum		Oxnard	Ventura	Central Coast	Historic house	website, museum in planning, Ventura County Landmark No. 165: Gottfried Maulhardt/Albert Pfeiler Farm Site
Pacific Grove Museum of Natural History		Pacific Grove	Monterey	Monterey Bay	Natural history	Local plants, animals, geology, and native human populations
Pajaro Valley Historical Association		Watsonville	Santa Cruz	Monterey Bay	Local history	Includes Bockius-Orr House and the Volck Museum, a carriage house with local history exhibits
Parks-Janeway Carriage House		Santa Ynez	Santa Barbara	Central Coast	Local history	website, over 35 horse-drawn vehicles, operated by the Santa Ynez Valley Historical Society Museum
Paso Robles Children's Museum at the Volunteer Firehouse		Paso Robles	San Luis Obispo	Central Coast	Children's	website, also heritage of the Paso Robles Volunteer Firefighters
Paso Robles Historical Society Museum		Paso Robles	San Luis Obispo	Central Coast	local history	website, housed in the old Carnegie Library in the Downtown City Park
Paso Robles Pioneer Museum		Paso Robles	San Luis Obispo	Central Coast	Local history	website, includes replica jail, historic schoolhouse, farming and mining equipment, cowboy display, carriages
Picard Trade Bead Museum and African Art Gallery		Carmel	Monterey	Monterey Bay	Decorative art	website, history and aesthetic display of beads traded in Africa throughout the centuries
Piedras Blancas Lighthouse		San Simeon	San Luis Obispo	Central Coast	Maritime	Guided lighthouse tours
Pleasant Valley Historical Society Museum		Camarillo	Ventura	Central Coast	Local history	website, local history museum and botanical garden
Point Hueneme Lighthouse		Port Hueneme	Ventura	Central Coast	Maritime	Lighthouse tours
Point Pinos Lighthouse		Pacific Grove	Monterey	Monterey Bay	Maritime	
Port Hueneme Historical Society Museum		Port Hueneme	Ventura	Central Coast	Local history	website
Point San Luis Lighthouse		Avila Beach	San Luis Obispo	Central Coast	Maritime	Guided lighthouse tours
Point Sur Lighthouse		Big Sur	Monterey	Monterey Bay	Maritime	Located in Point Sur Lightstation State Historic Park
Presidio of Monterey Museum		Monterey	Monterey	Monterey Bay	Military	website, development of the Presidio as a training base and Monterey's military history
Presidio of Santa Barbara		Santa Barbara	Santa Barbara	Central Coast	Open air	Also known as El Presidio de Santa Barbara State Historic Park
Rancho Camulos		Piru	Ventura	Central Coast	Open air	40-acre (16 ha) National Historic Landmark with 15 structures, situated within an 1,800-acre (7.3 km^{2}) working ranch
Rancho de Guadalupe Historical Society Museum		Guadalupe	Santa Barbara	Central Coast	Local history	website
Reagan Ranch Center Exhibit Galleries		Santa Barbara	Santa Barbara	Central Coast	History	website, Reagan Ranch artifacts, accomplishments of President Ronald Reagan's presidency
Rancho la Patera & Stow House		Goleta	Santa Barbara	Central Coast	Historic house	Operated by the Goleta Valley Historical Society
Rios-Caledonia Adobe		San Miguel	San Luis Obispo	Central Coast	Historic house	Friends of the Adobes, Inc. www.rios-caledoniaadobe.org
Ronald Reagan Presidential Library		Simi Valley	Ventura	Central Coast	Open air	Library, final resting place and museum about President Ronald Reagan
San Juan Bautista State Historic Park		San Juan Bautista	San Benito	Central Coast	Open air	Includes the Jose Castro House, the Mission San Juan Bautista, a jail, blacksmith shop and early American settler's cabin
San Lorenzo Valley Museum		Boulder Creek	Santa Cruz	Monterey Bay	Local history	website, operated by the San Lorenzo Valley Historical Society
San Luis Obispo Children's Museum		San Luis Obispo	San Luis Obispo	Central Coast	Children's	website
San Luis Obispo Museum of Art		San Luis Obispo	San Luis Obispo	Central Coast	Art	website, emphasizes artwork by contemporary, living California artists
San Luis Obispo Railroad Museum		San Luis Obispo	San Luis Obispo	Central Coast	Railroad	Railroad history of California and the Central Coast, historic railroad equipment and artifacts
Santa Barbara Historical Museum		Santa Barbara	Santa Barbara	Central Coast	Local history	
Santa Barbara Maritime Museum		Santa Barbara	Santa Barbara	Central Coast	Maritime	website, boat models, surfing, survival at sea, commercial fishing and diving, Channel Islands
Santa Barbara Museum of Art		Santa Barbara	Santa Barbara	Central Coast	Art	American European, Asian art, antiquities, modern and contemporary art, prints, drawings and photographs
Santa Barbara Museum of Natural History		Santa Barbara	Santa Barbara	Central Coast	Natural history	Includes dioramas of birds, mammals, and southern California habitats, halls of marine life, geology and Chumash Indian life, art gallery dedicated to antique natural history prints
Santa Barbara Museum of Natural History Sea Center		Santa Barbara	Santa Barbara	Central Coast	Natural history	Operated by the Santa Barbara Museum of Natural History, marine education center
Santa Barbara Surfing Museum		Santa Barbara	Santa Barbara	Central Coast	Sports	Surfboards, ukuleles, important figures
Santa Cruz Mission State Historic Park		Santa Cruz	Santa Cruz	Monterey Bay	Open air	Includes replica late 18th century Spanish mission church, adobe
Santa Cruz Museum of Natural History		Santa Cruz	Santa Cruz	Monterey Bay	Natural history	Wildlife, habitats, fossils, geology and Native peoples of the Santa Cruz Region, marine life
Santa Cruz Surfing Museum		Santa Cruz	Santa Cruz	Monterey Bay	Sports	Surfing history and culture
Santa Maria Valley Discovery Museum		Santa Maria	Santa Barbara	Central Coast	Children's	website
Santa Maria Valley Historical Society Museum		Santa Maria	Santa Barbara	Central Coast	Local history	
Santa Paula Art Museum		Santa Paula	Ventura	Central Coast	Art	website, collection focus is work by local artists
Santa Susana Depot		Simi Valley	Ventura	Central Coast	Railroad	Former Southern Pacific Railroad depot
Santa Ynez Valley Historical Museum		Santa Ynez	Santa Barbara	Central Coast	Local history	website, also includes Parks-Janeway Carriage House with over 35 horse-drawn vehicles
Satwiwa Native American Indian Culture Center		Newbury Park	Ventura	Central Coast	Native American	website
Sesnon Art Gallery		Santa Cruz	Santa Cruz	Monterey Bay	Art	website, part of Porter College of the University of California, Santa Cruz
Seymour Marine Discovery Center		Santa Cruz	Santa Cruz	Monterey Bay	Natural history	Part of the Long Marine Laboratory, features marine exhibit halls, aquarium, touch tanks, tours to marine mammal research overlook
Skateboard Museum		Simi Valley	Ventura	Central Coast	Sports	Skatepark and museum
Solvang Vintage Motorcycle Museum		Solvang	Santa Barbara	Central Coast	Transportation	
South Coast Railroad Museum		Goleta	Santa Barbara	Central Coast	Railroad	
South County Historical Society		Arroyo Grande	San Luis Obispo	Central Coast	Open air	website, complex includes Heritage House Museum, Paulding History House, Santa Manuela Schoolhouse, IOOF Hall with changing local history exhibits, and The "Barn" with antique vehicles and agriculture equipment
Stagecoach Inn Museum		Newbury Park	Ventura	Central Coast	Open air	Operated by the Conejo Valley Historical Society, includes replicas of the Stagecoach Inn with local natural history exhibits, carriage house with vehicles, 1874 pioneer home, blacksmith shop, Spanish-Mexican adobe and a Chumash Ap (tule dwelling)
Steinbeck's Spirit of Monterey Wax Museum		Monterey	Monterey	Monterey Bay	Wax	Monterey historic figures
Strathearn Historical Park and Museum		Simi Valley	Ventura	Central Coast	Open air	Includes the Simi Adobe-Strathearn House, children's playhouse, 1902 Catholic church, library, barber shop, pitting shed and barns with farm tools and equipment
Susan Quinlan Doll & Teddy Bear Museum & Library		Santa Barbara	Santa Barbara	Central Coast	Doll	website
Templeton Historical Museum		Templeton	San Luis Obispo	Central Coast	Local history	website
Tor House and Hawk Tower		Carmel-by-the-Sea	Monterey	Monterey Bay	Historic house	Home of poet Robinson Jeffers
Trussell-Winchester Adobe		Santa Barbara	Santa Barbara	Central Coast	Historic house	website, operated by the Santa Barbara Historical Association, 1845 adobe
U.S. Navy Seabee Museum		Port Hueneme	Ventura	Central Coast	Military	website, history of the Seabees and the Civil Engineer Corps located at Naval Base Ventura County
Vandenberg Air Force Base Space and Missile Heritage Center		Vandenberg Air Force Base	Santa Barbara	Central Coast	Aerospace	Evolution of missile and spacelift activity at Vandenberg
Western Foundation of Vertebrate Zoology		Camarillo	Ventura	Central Coast	Natural history	Research museum with guided tours of its collection of bird, nest and egg specimens once a month
Westmont Ridley-Tree Museum of Art		Santa Barbara	Santa Barbara	Central Coast	Art	website, part of the Adams Center for the Visual Arts at Westmont College
Wildling Museum of Art and Nature		Solvang	Santa Barbara	Central Coast	Art	website, art and photography of America's wilderness and wildlife
Whalers Cabin		Carmel-by-the-Sea	Monterey	Monterey Bay	Multiple	Displays include history of Point Lobos, area fisherman and immigrants, adjacent Whaling Station Museum with whaling artifacts

== Defunct museums ==
- Chandler Vintage Museum of Transportation and Wildlife, Oxnard, collections sold in 2006
- Perry-Downer House and Costume Gallery, Monterey, private house since 2010
