= Carmelito, California =

Carmelito
- Former planned settlement
- Location in California
- Coordinates: 36°30′57.5″N 121°56′13″W
- Country: United States
- State: California
- County: Monterey
- Elevation: 23 ft (7 m)

Carmelito was a planned settlement, initially called Point Lobos City, on Point Lobos in Monterey County, California, United States. It was located just north of Carmel Highlands and about 3 miles (4.8 km) south of Carmel on Highway 1. Sited on the former Rancho San Jose y Sur Chiquito, the Carmelo Land and Coal Company planned the subdivision in 1890 when their coal mine on nearby Malpaso Creek proved to be unprofitable. It subdivided the land into 1,000 parcels, which began selling lots for $25 to $50. The lack of a bridge across the Carmel River and two national economic recessions during the 1890s combined to severely restrict sales. Only a few small cabins were built.

== History ==
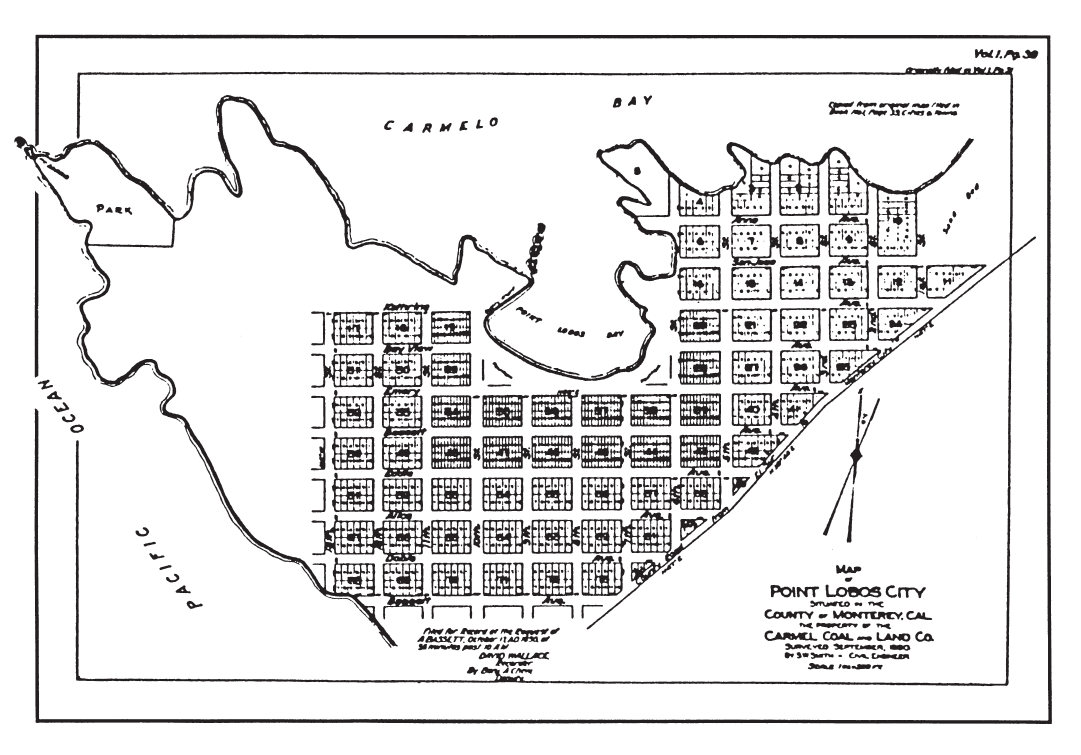
Plot map of planned Point Lobos City, September 1890

Alexander M. Allan, a successful race track architect and real estate developer from Illinois, purchased 640 acres (260 ha) of Point Lobos from the Carmelo Land and Coal Company in 1898. Allan and his wife Satie appreciated the natural beauty of the point and were concerned about the growing number of visitors who wanted to see the rare Monterey Cypress trees and scenic coastline. They put up toll gates, prohibited camping, and charged visitors 50 cents a vehicle (about $10 today) to enter the point. Allan bought the lots that had been subdivided and later got the subdivisions removed from the county record. Eunice Riley, Alexander's daughter, repurchased the last subdivided lots in the 1950s.

== Conversion to reserve ==
By the mid-1920s, the Save the Redwoods League was actively involved in an effort to preserve the Monterey Cypress. They hired the internationally known landscape architect, Frederick Law Olmsted, to research Point Lobos and report on the areas most noteworthy of preservation. Olmsted's report described Point Lobos as "the most outstanding example on the coast of California of picturesque rock and surf scenery in combination with unique vegetation, including typical Monterey Cypress."

In 1933, three years after Alexander Allan's death, the State of California bought 348 acres (141 ha) from the Allan family for $631,000 and established the Point Lobos State Natural Reserve. The Allan family donated to the state an additional 15 acres (6.1 ha) of cypress-covered headlands at the western tip of the point as a memorial grove to Alexander and Satie Allan.
