= Pajaro Valley Historical Association =

Pajaro Valley Historical Association (PVHA) is a historical association founded in 1940 dedicated to preserving the history and notable artifacts of the Pajaro Valley in Central California. It is housed in a complex of buildings centered around the Godfrey M. Bockius House and manages the Volck Museum and Alzora Snyder Archive.

== History ==
The PVHA was founded in 1940 by the local chapter of the Native Sons of the Golden West encouraged by the Watsonville Woman's Club. The PVHA incorporated in 1956. In 1964, Helen Haynes Volck Tucker donated her home to the group to be used as a museum, which was dedicated on July 4, 1965. The Godfrey M. Bockius House was donated in 1993 by Zoe Ann Orr Marcus to the association, and it moved into that location in 1997.

Over the years, the PVHA has played a role in promoting as well as preserving the history of the region. In 1955 the Pajaro Valley Historical Association erected a monument on Charley Parkhurst's grave site.

== Current assets ==
In addition to managing the Bockius-Orr house, the PVHA oversees the Alzora Snyder Archive, housing over 75,000 photos, maps and historical artifacts relevant to the region. The Volck Museum was previously the home of the PVHA, but was sold after the move to the Bokius-Orr house. https://www.pajarovalleyhistory.org/who-we-are/

The archive houses special collections including some original source material for the following historians and persons of note:

- Historian Betty Bagby Lewis
- Charley Parkhurst
- Architect W. H. Weeks
