= Godfrey M. Bockius House =

Historic house in California, United States

- Bockius, Godfrey M., House
- U.S. National Register of Historic Places
- U.S. Historic district
- Watsonville Historic Landmark
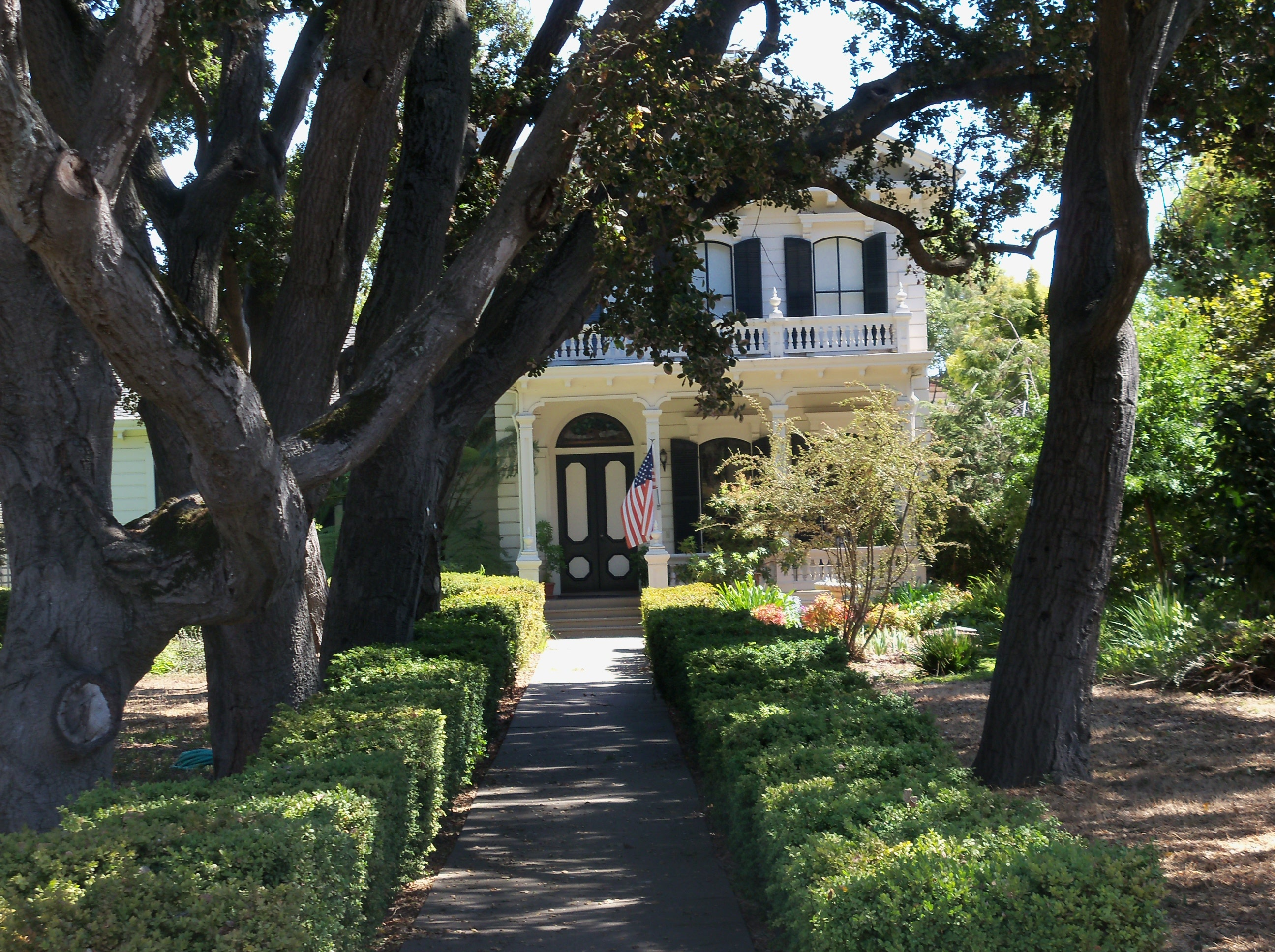

- Location within California
- Location: 322 E. Beach St., Watsonville, California
- Coordinates: 36°54′58″N 121°44′51″W
- Area: 1 acre (0.40 ha)
- Built: 1870
- Architect: Alex Chalmers
- Architectural style: Italianate—Victorian
- NRHP reference No.: 89000937
- Added to NRHP: July 13, 1989

The Godfrey M. Bockius House (better known locally as the Bockius - Orr House) is an Italianate—Victorian style house in a historic district in Watsonville, California. It was built in 1870 by Judge Godfrey M. Bockius, and was inhabited later by descendant Frank F. Orr, former editor of the Register-Pajaronian. Today the historical district contains the house itself, headquarters of the Pajaro Valley Historical Association and on the National Register of Historic Places, along with the Volck Museum and Alzora Snyder Archive.

== Godfrey M. Bockius ==
Judge Bockius was one of the prominent early leaders in the development of agriculture in the Pajaro Valley and in city government and commerce in the City of Watsonville. He was a judge in Santa Cruz County, California from 1858 to 1862. In 1868, Watsonville was incorporated and Judge Bockius served as chairman of the first Board of Trustees of the city. In 1871, he was elected to the California State Assembly.

== Frank F. Orr ==
Frank Orr, the last of four generations to inhabit the house, was editor of the Register Pajaronian newspaper which won a 1956 Pulitzer Prize in Public Service for his and others investigative reporting into a corrupt County District Attorney's involvement in gambling. The Alzora Snyder Archive includes numerous formerly classified photos from Mr. Orr's collection gathered during his service as Director of Still Picture Operations in the US Army Signal Corps during World War II, where he obtained the rank of captain.
