= Elverhøj Museum of History and Art =

Museum in California dedicated to Danish culture

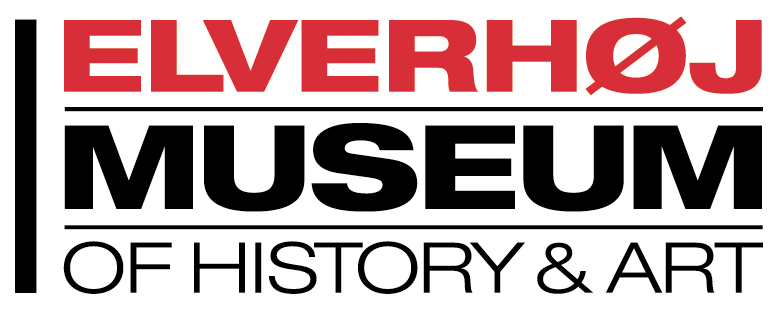

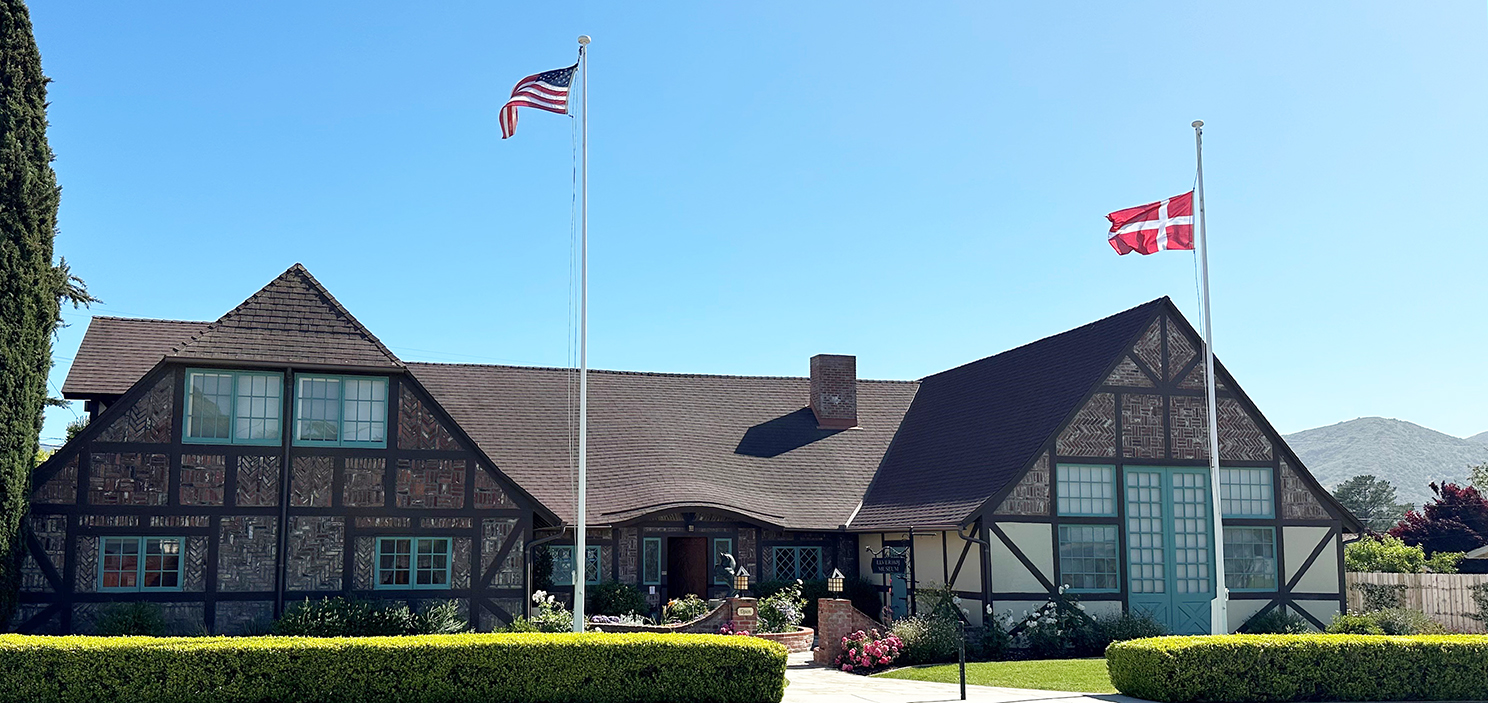
- Museum Exterior 2025
- Established: May 1988
- Location: Solvang, California
- Coordinates: 34°35′31″N 120°08′35″W
- Type: History and Art Museum
- Visitors: 25,000+/per year
- Executive director: Sandie Mullin
- Website: elverhoj.org

Elverhøj Museum of History and Art is a museum in Solvang, California, whose mission is "to collect, preserve and exhibit the history and Danish culture of Solvang and to promote the arts." It is one of the few examples of museums outside of Denmark that focus on Danish/Danish-American culture. It is located a few blocks from the town center. It is on a residential side street south of downtown.

The museum was the former residence of Viggo Brandt-Erichsen, an internationally known painter and sculptor, and his wife Martha Mott, a painter and art teacher. In 1950, the couple constructed their house to reflect large farmhouses of 18th century Jutland in Denmark. The museum was renovated in 1987 and opened to the public in May 1988. The Brandt-Erichsen family first donated it to the Santa Ynez Valley Historical Society. Subsequently, the City of Solvang took over ownership and maintenance and the non-profit Solvang Heritage Associates operated the museum. Later, due to the city's decline in budget, the ownership and maintenance was transferred to Solvang Heritage Associates in June 2007.

The name Elverhøj means "Elves' Hill". It came from the famous folk play Elverhøj from 1828 where a king visits dancing wood-spirits and forest friends at night. The play has been performed in Solvang since 1914. The redwood carving on the front door was inspired by the play and designed by Viggo Brandt-Erichsen. It is now the museum's logotype.

Elements of Scandinavian architecture can be seen throughout the building, such as ornamental wrought iron, a carved wooden front door, and hand-painted panels. There is a traditional Danish kitchen with pine floors, countertops, and tables decorated with hand-painted green and stenciled flowers. The museum also contains a number of old photographs and traditional arts and crafts, such as displays of paper cutting, lace-making, and wooden clog making. There are also rotating exhibits that change throughout the year about the surrounding area.

The Museum Store offers a curated selection of Danish and Scandinavian books, jewelry, and other gift items.

The museum is open Thursday - Monday from 11:00 a.m. - 5:00 p.m.

Non-member admission is $5.00 for ages 12+. Seniors (65+) admission is $4.00. Veterans, Active Military, and all children under 12 are free.

Elverhøj Museum of History and Art is a member of the North American Reciprocal Museum Association (NARM), the Reciprocal Organization of Associated Museums (ROAM), and Museums For All.
