= Santa Barbara Surfing Museum =

- Established: 1992
- Dissolved: 2017
- Location: 16 1/2 Helena Avenue: #C, Santa Barbara, California
- Coordinates: 34.413397°N 119.688971°W
- Type: Sports museum

Santa Barbara Surfing Museum was a museum to the sport of surfing at 16 1/2 Herlena Avenue in Santa Barbara, California. It was established by Jim O'Mahoney and opened in 1992. The museum's collection included 50 surfboards including redwood and balsa boards designed by board builders including Reynolds Yater, as well as a collection of ukuleles.

In 2017, O'Mahoney announced that the museum was closing.
