= Whalers Cabin =

Historic building in California, U.S.

- U.S. National Register of Historic Places
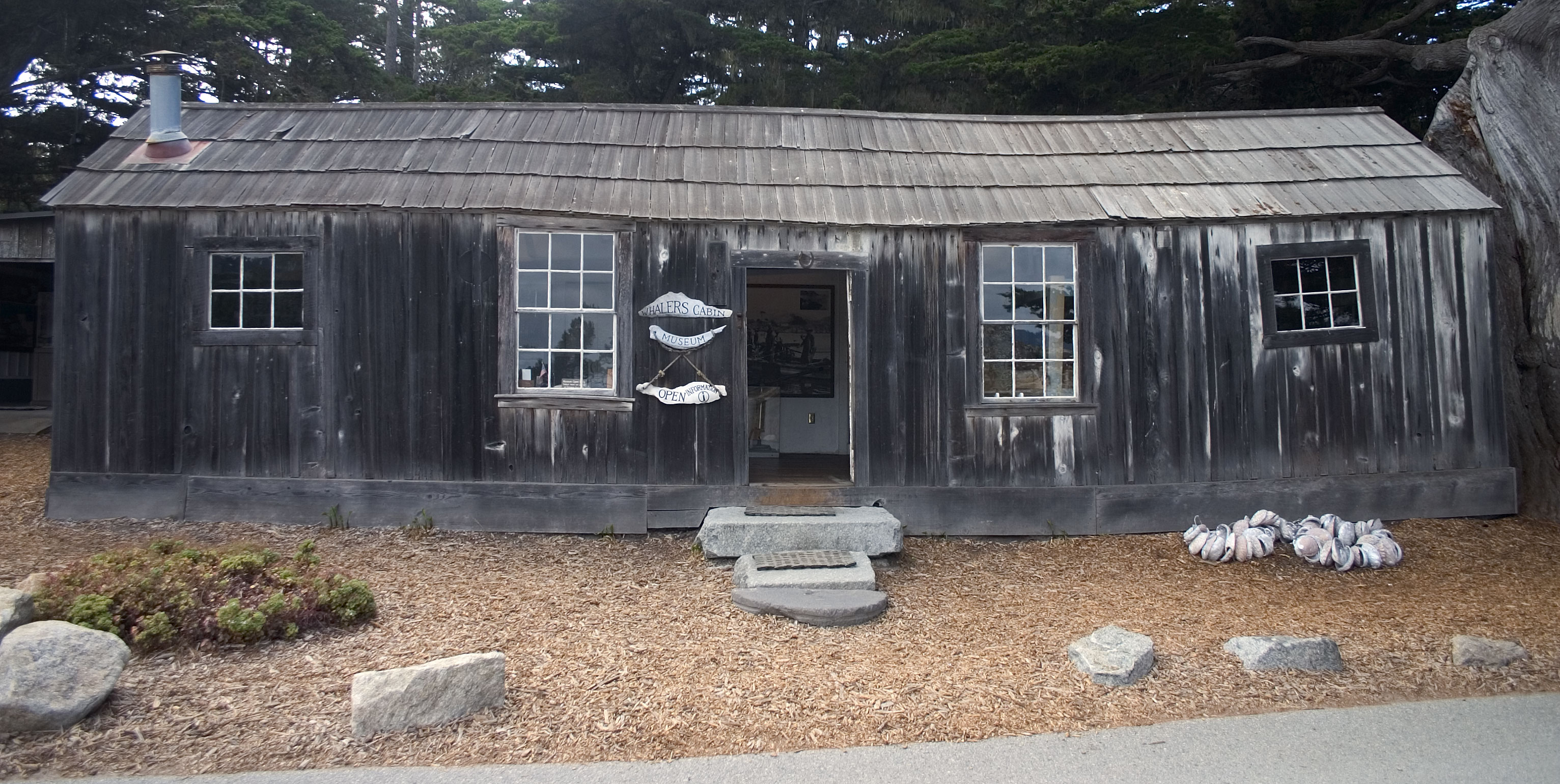

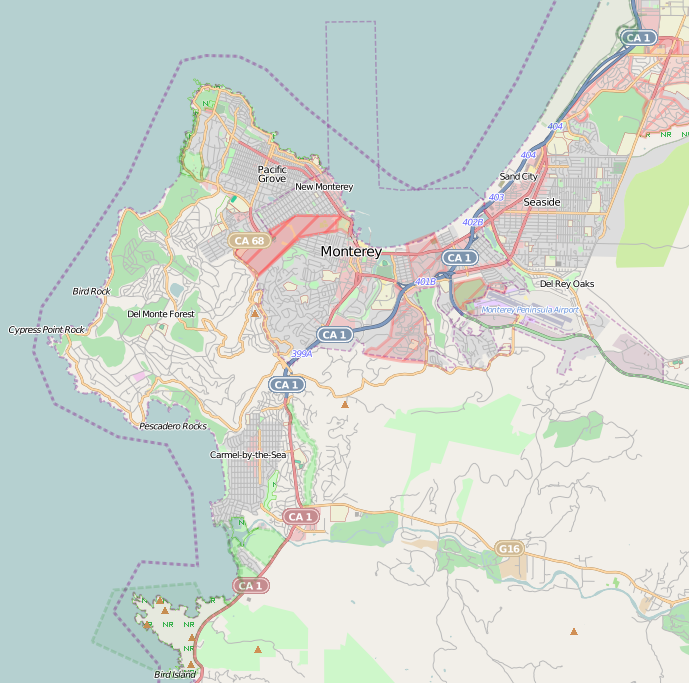
- Location within Monterey Peninsula Location within California Location within the United States
- Location: Pt. Lobos State Natural Reserve, 4 mi (6.4 km). S of Carmel
- Nearest city: Carmel-by-the-Sea, California
- Coordinates: 36°31′7″N 121°56′1″W
- Area: less than one acre
- Built: 1850s
- Architectural style: Cabin
- NRHP reference No.: 07000406
- Added to NRHP: May 9, 2007

The Whalers Cabin near Carmel-by-the-Sea, California, is a historic building that is listed on the National Register of Historic Places. It is located in what is now Point Lobos State Natural Reserve, four miles south of Carmel.

The cabin was built in the 1850s to house Japanese and Chinese fishermen. Shore whaling was conducted here by the Carmel Whaling Company from 1862 to 1884 and by the Japanese Whaling Company from 1898 to 1900. The building now houses a museum dedicated to cultural history of the area. The museum also highlights the history of Point Lobos, including its cinematic appearances and plans at the turn of the 20th century to develop the area for densely packed suburban housing.

It was listed on the National Register in 2007; the listing included one contributing building and one contributing site.
