= Point Lobos =

Cape in California, United States

Point Lobos State Natural Reserve
- IUCN category V (protected landscape/seascape)
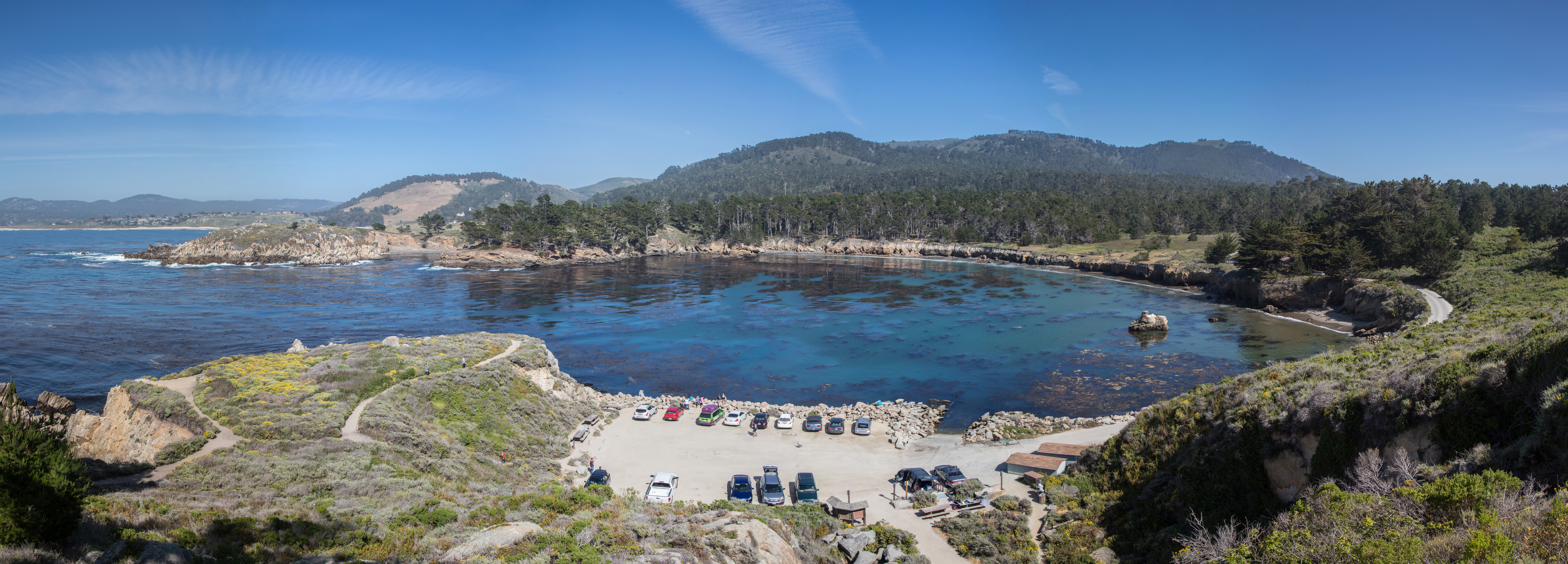
- Looking north over Whaler's Cove, the largest of a number of coves in Point Lobos, and the location of Whalers Cabin

- Location within California Location within the United States
- Location: Monterey County, California, United States
- Nearest city: Carmel-by-the-Sea
- Coordinates: 36°31′1.56″N 121°56′33.36″W
- Area: 550 acres (220 ha) onshore; 775 acres (314 ha) offshore
- Governing body: California Department of Parks and Recreation

U.S. National Natural Landmark
- Designated: 1967

Point Lobos and the Point Lobos State Natural Reserve is a state park in Central California, on the Pacific coast between the Carmel highlands and Big Sur. Adjoining Point Lobos is "one of the richest marine habitats in California", which is safeguarded by two marine protected areas: Point Lobos State Marine Conservation Area and the Point Lobos State Marine Reserve. (See below) The sea near Point Lobos is considered one of the best locations for scuba diving on the Monterey Peninsula and along the California coast. Point Lobos is home to one of two originally occurring endemic groves of the Monterey Cypress (Cupressus macrocarpa) in the world. The cold and nutrient-rich upwelling driven by the adjacent Carmel Submarine Canyon fuels its rich habitats.

Point Lobos is just south of Carmel-by-the-Sea, and at the north end of the Big Sur coast of the Pacific Ocean. Point Lobos features a number of hiking trails, many alongside the ocean, and a smaller number of beaches. The historic Whalers Cabin, built by Chinese fishermen and later used by Japanese and Portuguese fishermen, is now a museum.

In 1896, the Carmelo Land and Coal Company subdivided the land into 1,000 lots and named the prospective development "Carmelito". Then-engineer Alexander Allan began purchasing the land and over many years bought back the lots that had been sold and eliminated the subdivision. Although Allen resisted the idea of turning the point into a public park, his family sold the vast majority of the land to the state of California in 1933, three years after his death. Two additional parcels have been added since.

As of 2017, more than one million annual visitors from around the world visited Point Lobos, which is restricted by only 150 on-site parking spaces. The majority of visitors must park on the shoulder of Highway 1 and walk into the reserve.

== Geography and natural features ==
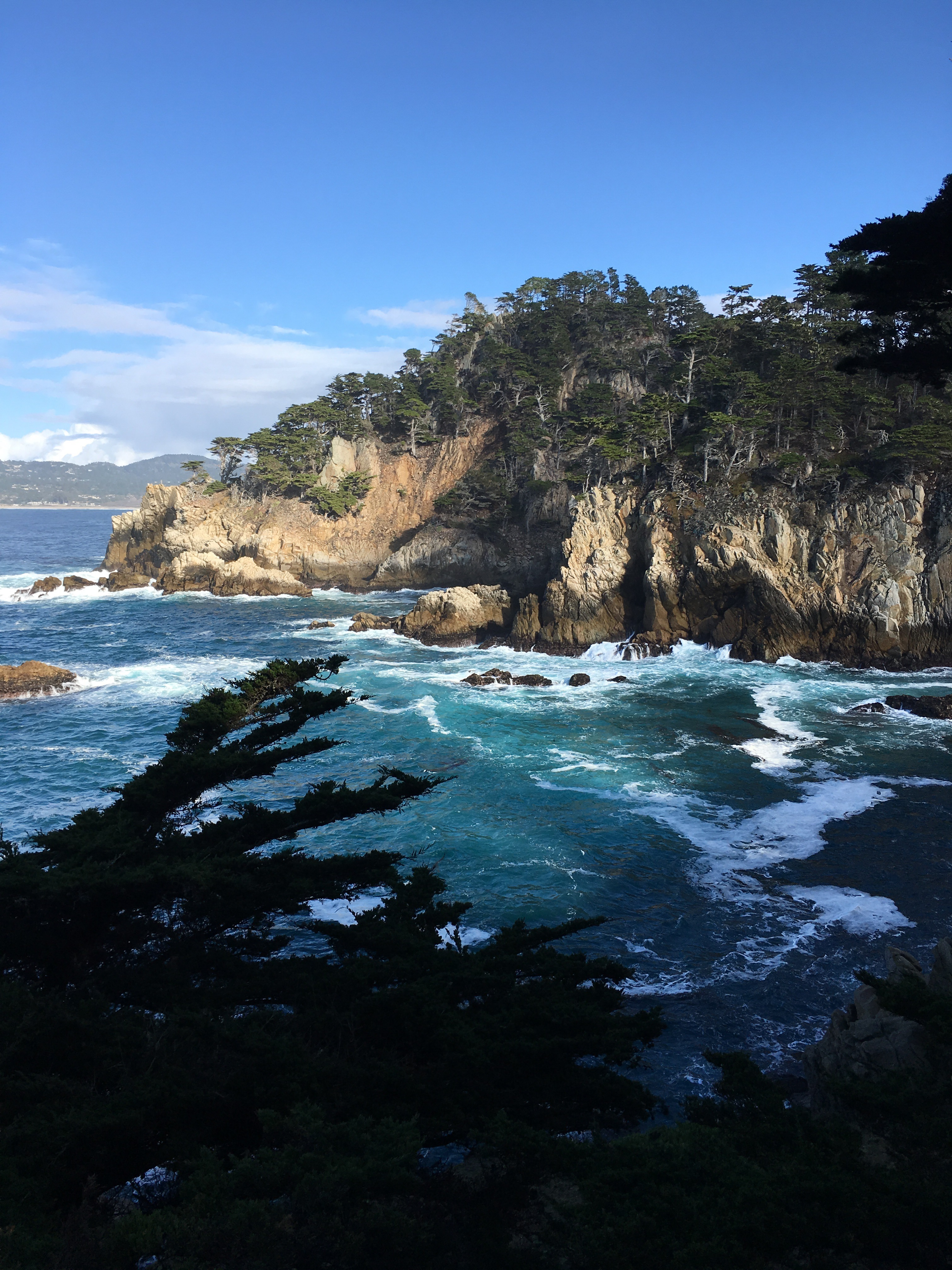
Along the Cypress Cove Trail, Point Lobos State Park

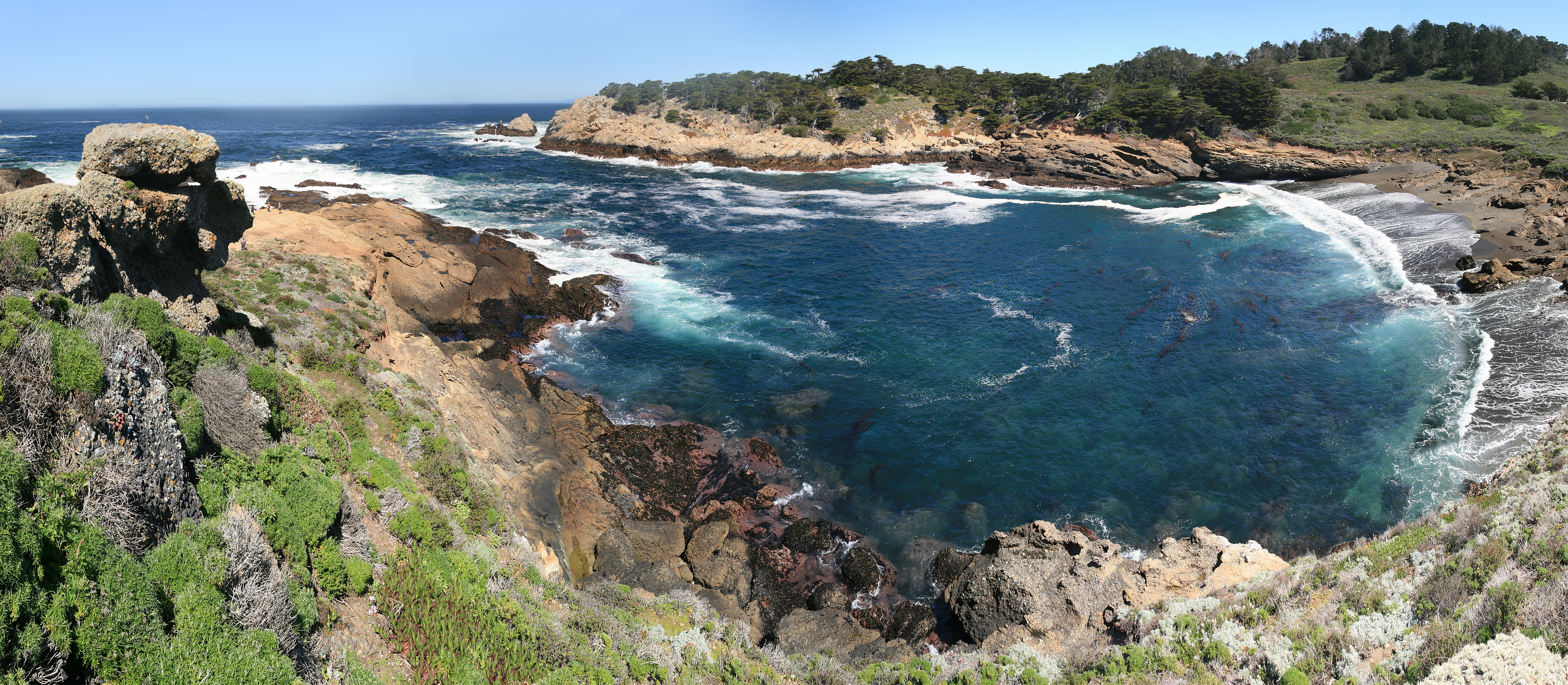
A panoramic view of Headland Cove

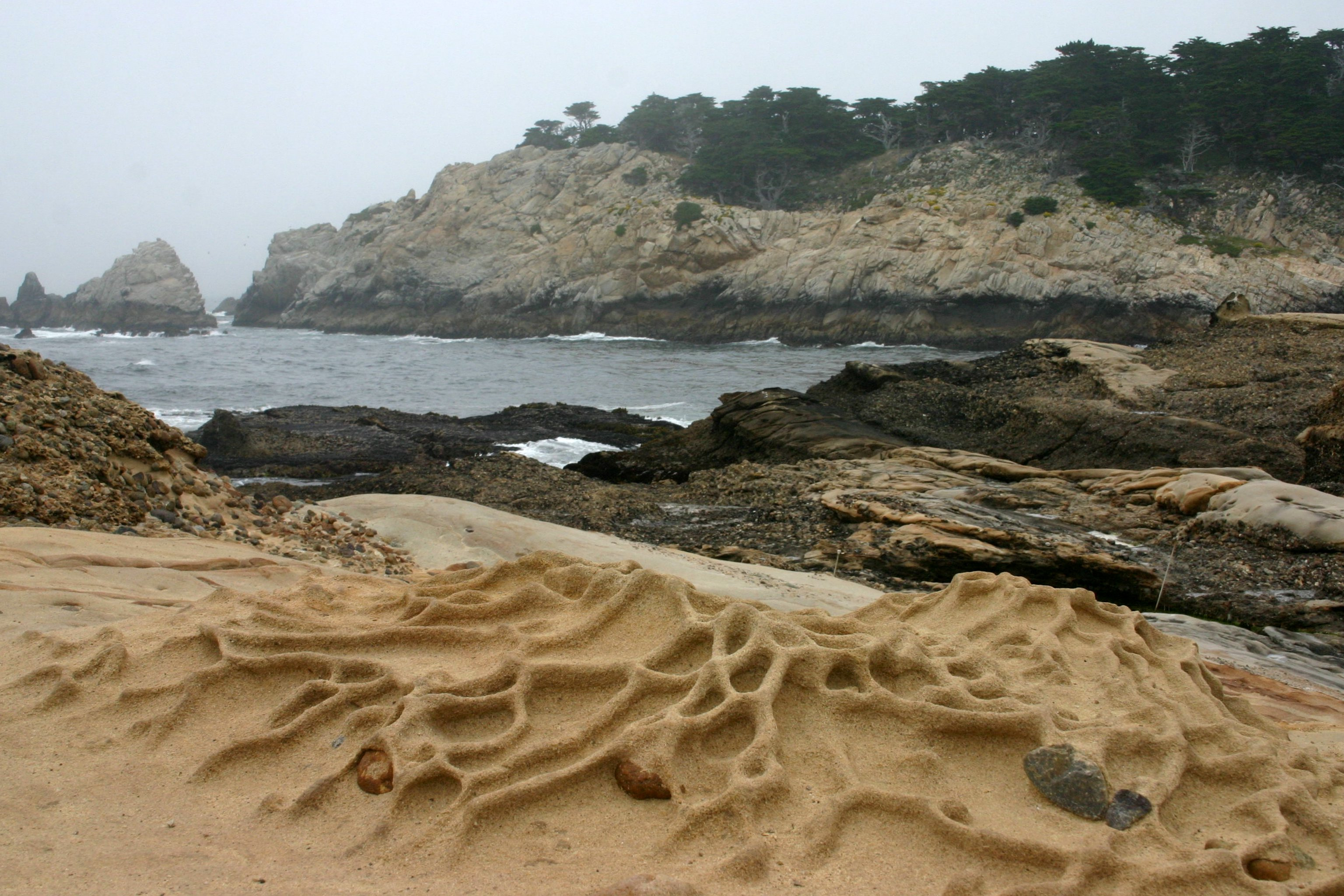
Rocky coast at low tide

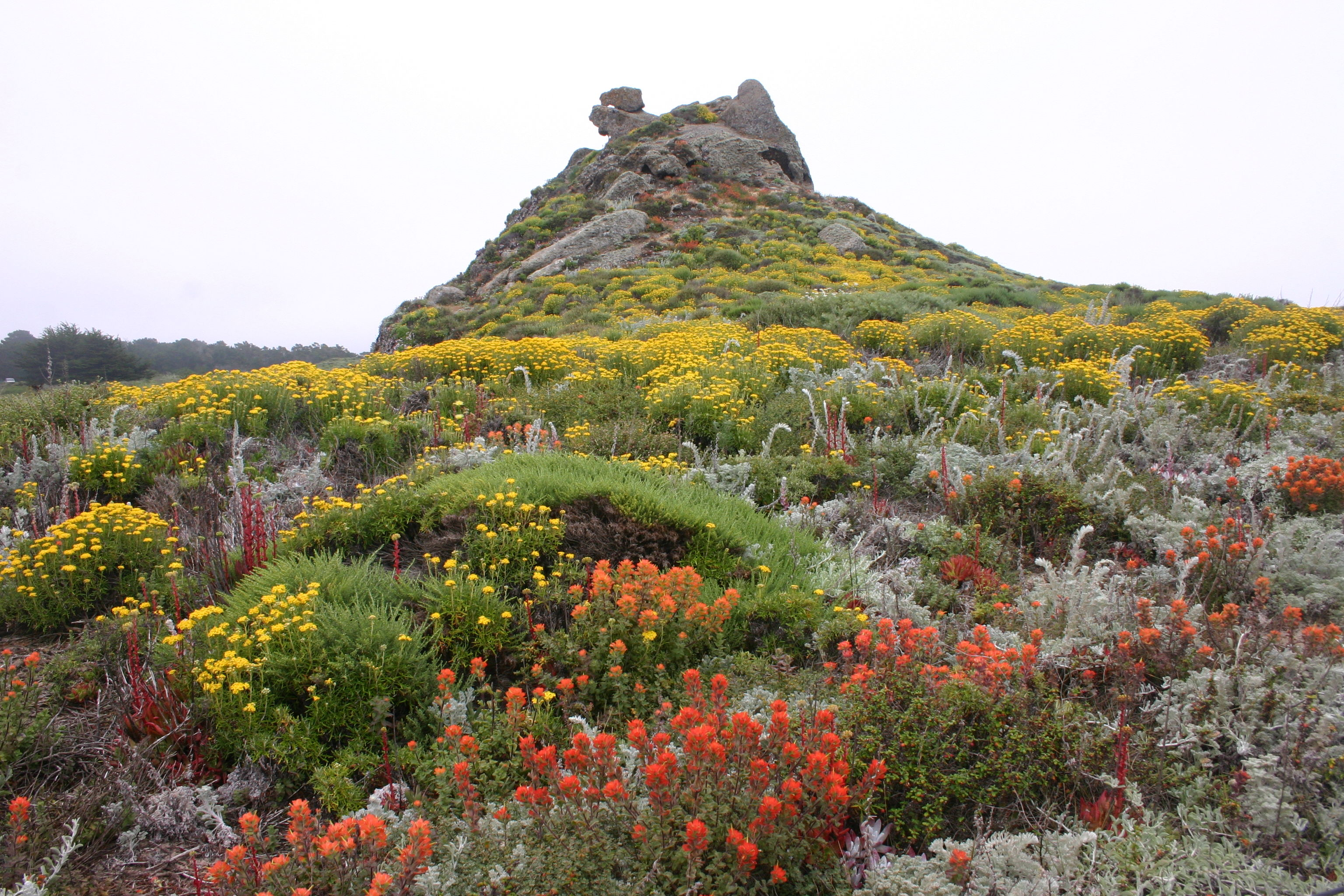
Wildflowers at Point Lobos, 2006

The Point Lobos contains a rich and diverse plant and animal life both on shore and in the water. It was called the "greatest meeting of land and water in the world" by Australian-born landscape artist Francis McComas.

The Carmel submarine canyon lies just north of Point Lobos. Like Monterey Canyon to the north the canyon provides cold, nutrient-rich water to the surface during upwelling events. These nutrient-rich waters fuel the high primary productivity seen in Carmel and Monterey Bays, which in turn support the high diversity of life observed in the water and on land at Point Lobos.

Point Lobos is one of only two places where the Monterey Cypress are native. They have developed wind-trimmed canopies in response to the consistent coastal winds. The cypresses grow mainly in soils derived from granodiorite parent rock. Despite their resilience to coastal weather, these groves remain vulnerable to cypress canker (Seiridium cardinale), which is a fungal disease that affects foliage and branch health. The waters around Point Lobos contain massive kelp forests sustained by cold and nutrient-rich coastal upwelling from the nearby Carmel Submarine Canyon. Dominated primarily by giant kelp (Macrocystis pyrifera) and bull kelp (Nereocystis luetkeana), these dense underwater canopies form a vital subtidal habitat across nearshore rocky reefs such as Whaler’s Middle Reef and Cannery Point. The kelp forest provides nursery habitat, food, and shelter for diverse marine life, including rockfish, sea otters, harbor seals, and diving seabirds.

== Recreation and visitor impact ==
The reserve has several miles of trails. Visitors can view the coastal scenery, explore the coast, and picnic. California's marine protected areas encourage recreational and educational uses of the ocean. The quality of the underwater environment in the adjacent marine protected areas draws a large number of scuba divers. Whaler's Cove is often used by divers to begin their dives. Other activities include kayaking, snorkeling, and diving. The large number of visitors is causing erosion in some places. The Point Lobos Foundation has coordinated volunteer days with the goal of planting hundreds of native species to restore eroded areas. Point Lobos State Natural Reserve is planning to reduce overcrowding by requiring visitors to obtain reservations at peak times. To balance public access with ecosystem protection, California State Parks manages active habitat restoration efforts along eroded trails, while California Department of Fish and Wildlife regulates human activities offshore.

=== Marine Protected Areas ===
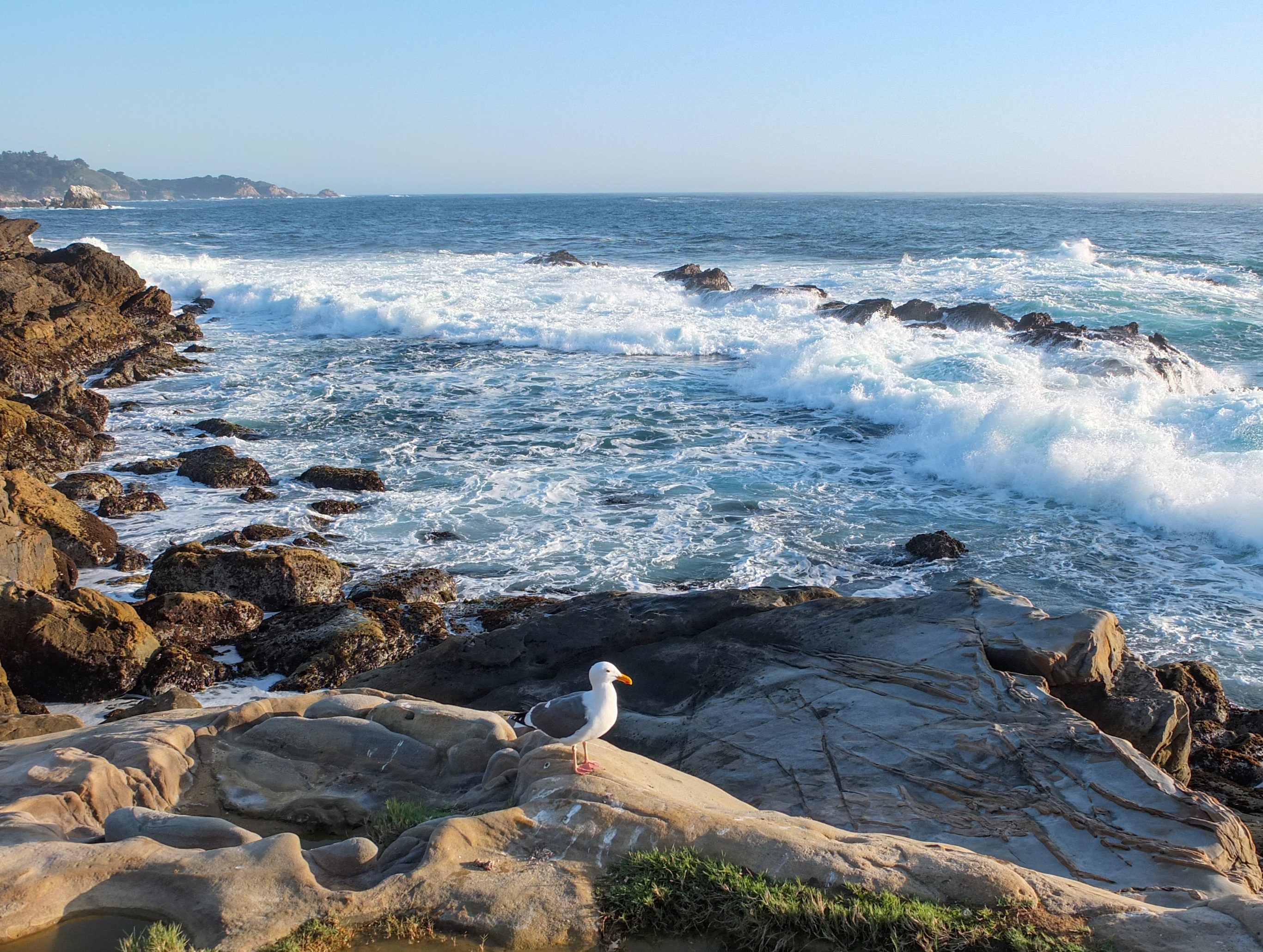
Western gull at S Shore Trail

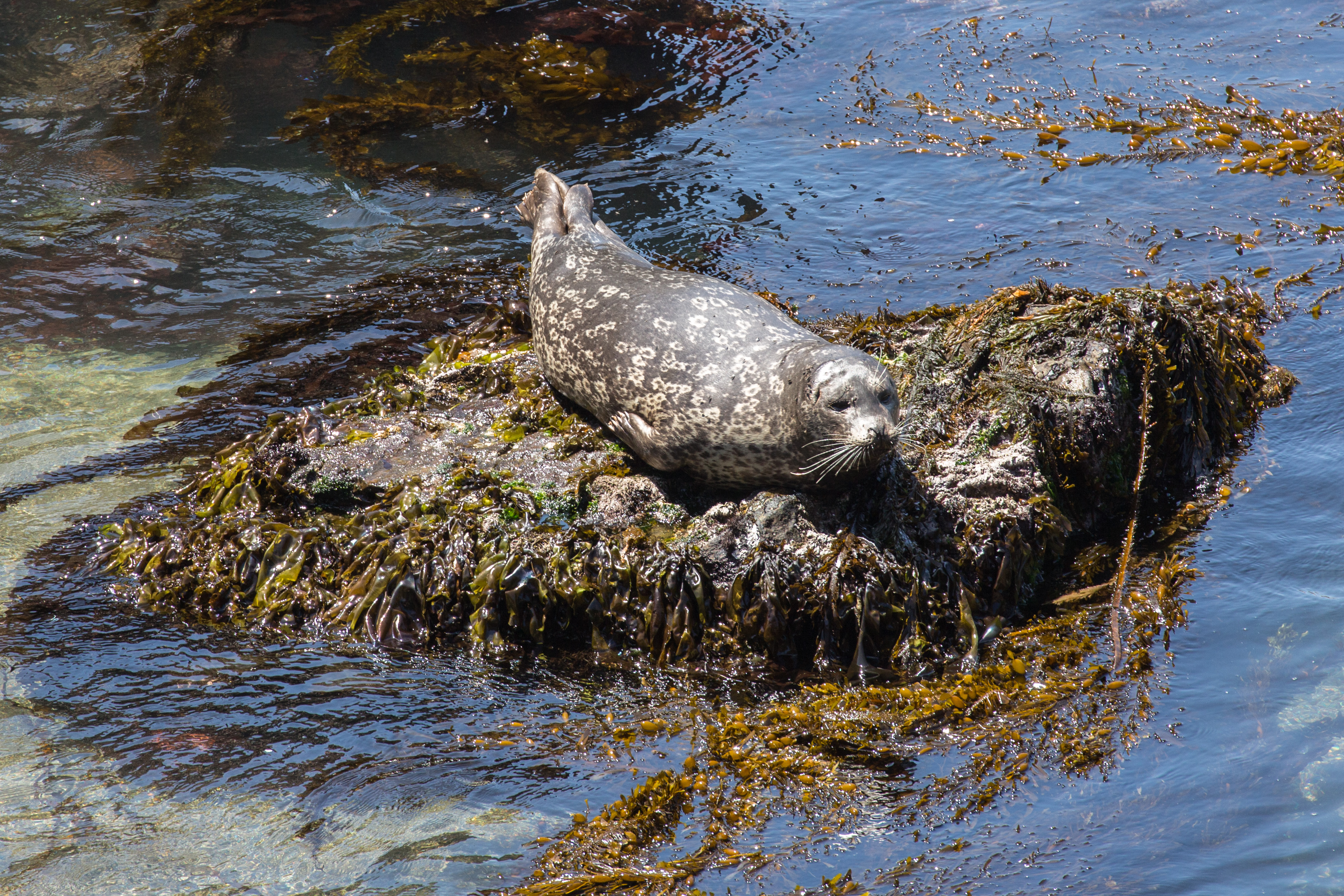
A harbor seal

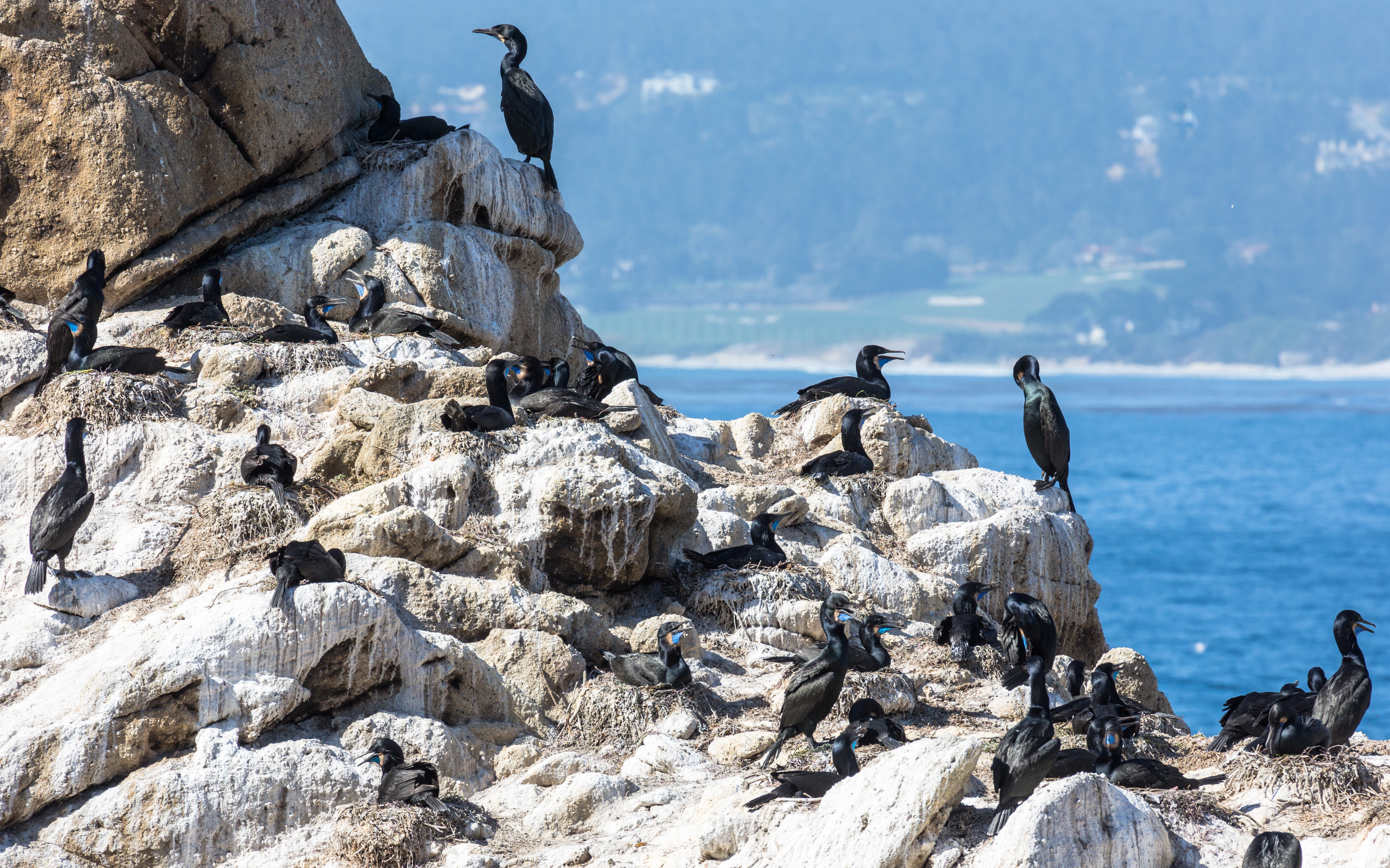
Brandt's cormorant colony

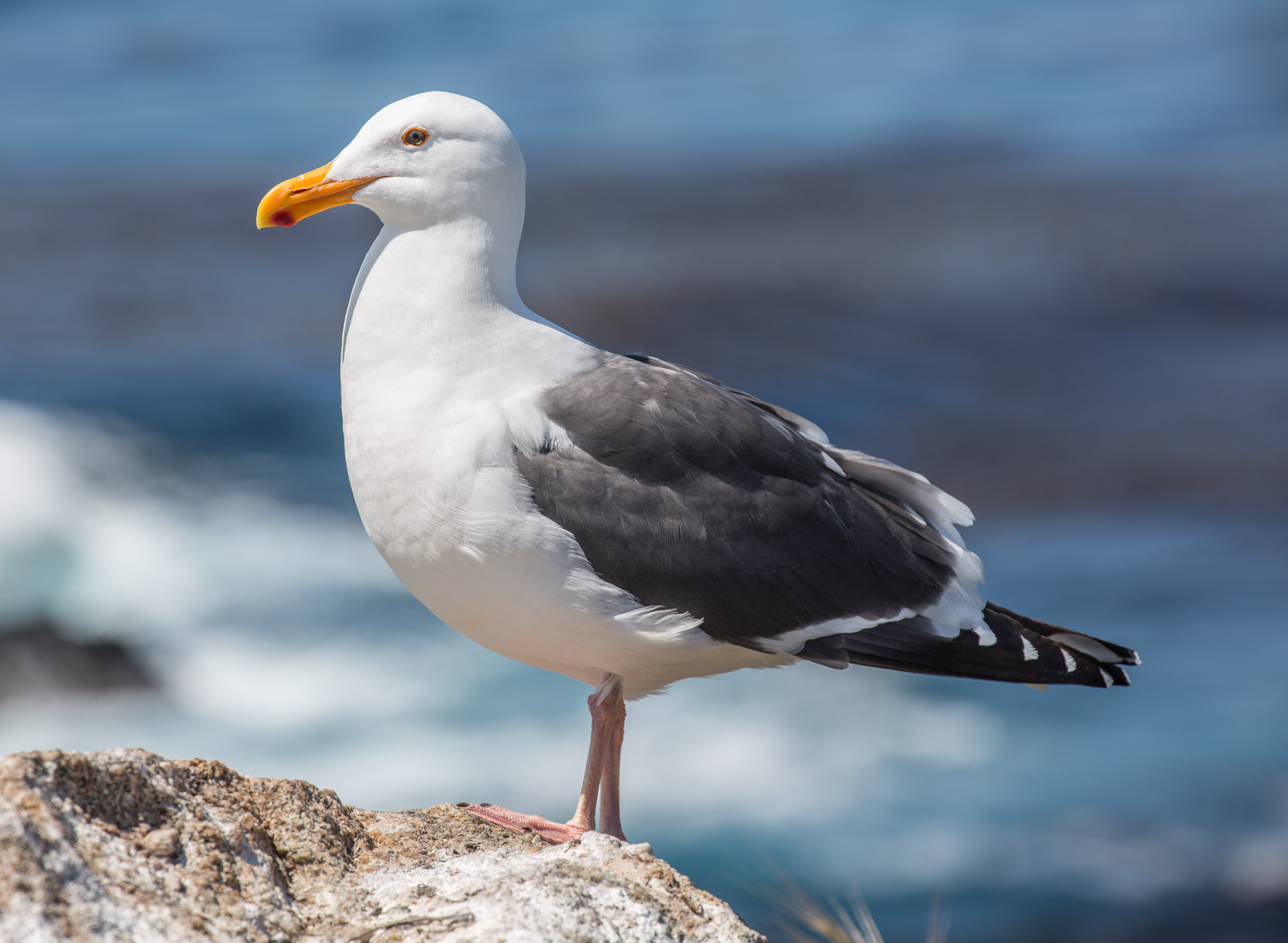
Western gull

The original Point Lobos Ecological Reserve was created in 1973. It has become "one of the richest marine habitats in California". Divers may not take any fish or mollusks within the reserve. The Point Lobos marine protected areas provide shelter to a wide range of fish, invertebrates, birds, and marine mammals, from those that rely on the near-shore kelp forest to those that inhabit the deep waters of the Carmel Submarine Canyon. The waters contain extensive kelp forests supported by cold and nutrient-rich coastal upwelling from the adjacent submarine canyon. Dominated primarily by giant kelp (Macrocystis pyrifera) and bull kelp (Nereocystis luetkeana), these dense underwater canopies form vital subtidal habitats across nearshore rocky reefs such as Whaler’s Middle Reef and Cannery Point. The kelp forests provide essential nursery grounds, food, and shelter for diverse marine life, including rockfish, sea otters, harbor seals, and diving seabirds.

In 2007, the California Department of Fish and Game expanded the ecological reserve and renamed it as the Point Lobos State Marine Reserve and Point Lobos State Marine Conservation Area. A no-take zone was extended from the east side of Monastery Beach to the mouth of MalPaso Creek. They were two of 29 marine protected areas adopted during the first phase of the Marine Life Protection Act Initiative, a collaborative public process to create a statewide network of marine protected areas along the California coastline.

==== State Marine Reserve ====
Point Lobos SMR covers 5.36 square miles. The SMR protects all marine life within its boundaries. Fishing and take of all living marine resources is prohibited.

==== State Marine Conservation Area ====
Managed by the California Department of Fish and Wildlife, the 8.83 square mile SMCA buffers the fully protected State Marine Reserve. While it restricts most resource harvesting to safeguard nearshore habitats, it accommodates limited recreational and commercial take of pelagic species, specifically salmon, albacore and commercial spot prawn, which move through deeper offshore water without disrupting local reef ecosystems.

=== Scientific monitoring ===
As specified by the Marine Life Protection Act, select marine protected areas along California's central coast are monitored by scientists to track their effectiveness and learn more about ocean health. Similar studies in marine protected areas located off of the Santa Barbara Channel Islands have already detected gradual improvements in fish size and number. At Point Lobos, ongoing ecological monitoring by the California Department of Fish and Wildlife tracks habitat health and species recovery across both the State Marine Reserve no-take zones and the State Marine Conservation Area. These studies focus on evaluating marine biodiversity, including kelp forest canopy dynamics and rockfish populations, to assess the longterm effectiveness of the reserve’s full protection boundaries.

== Whaling Station Museum ==
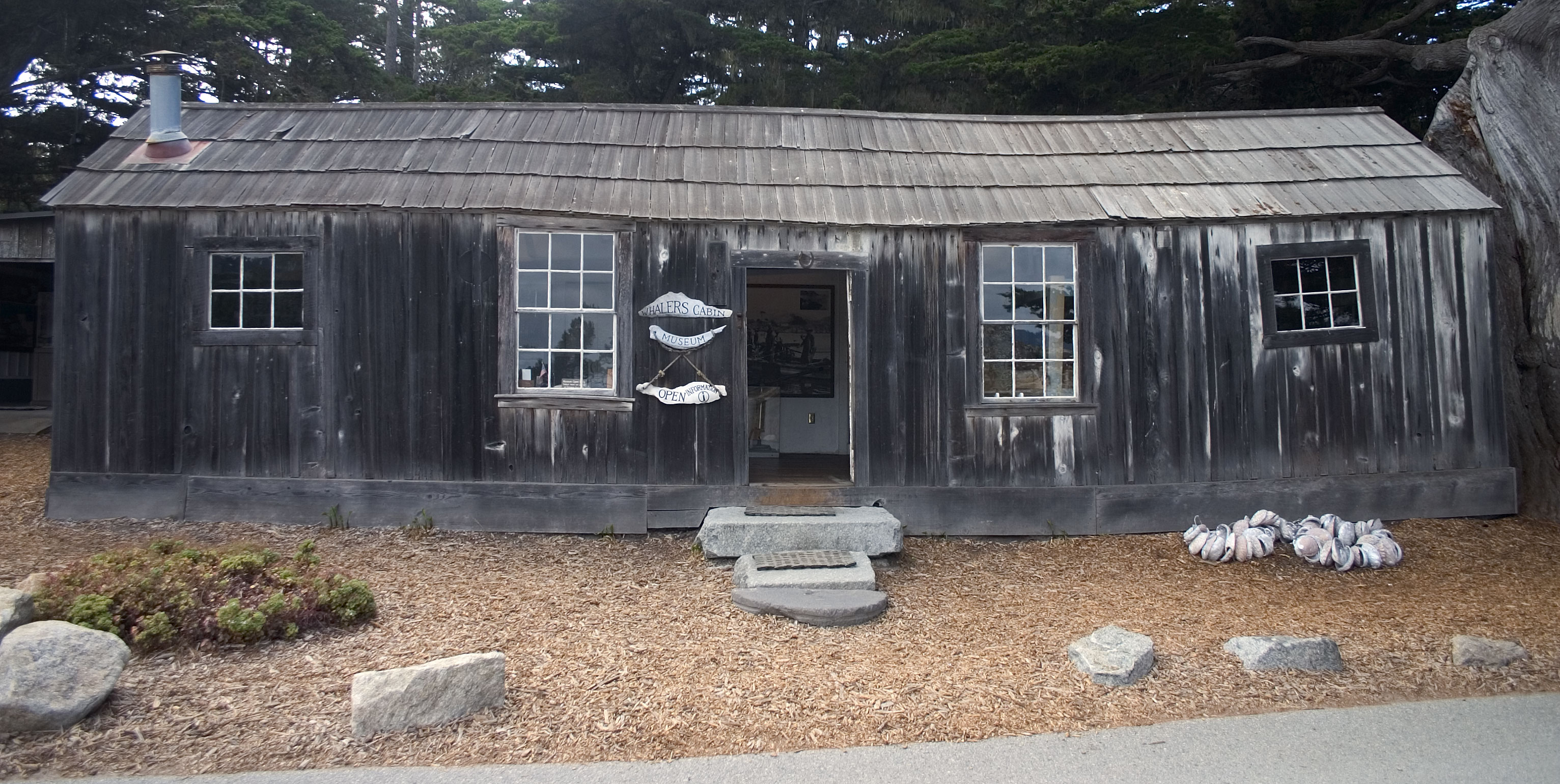
Whalers Cabin was built around 1850 as a fisherman's hut.

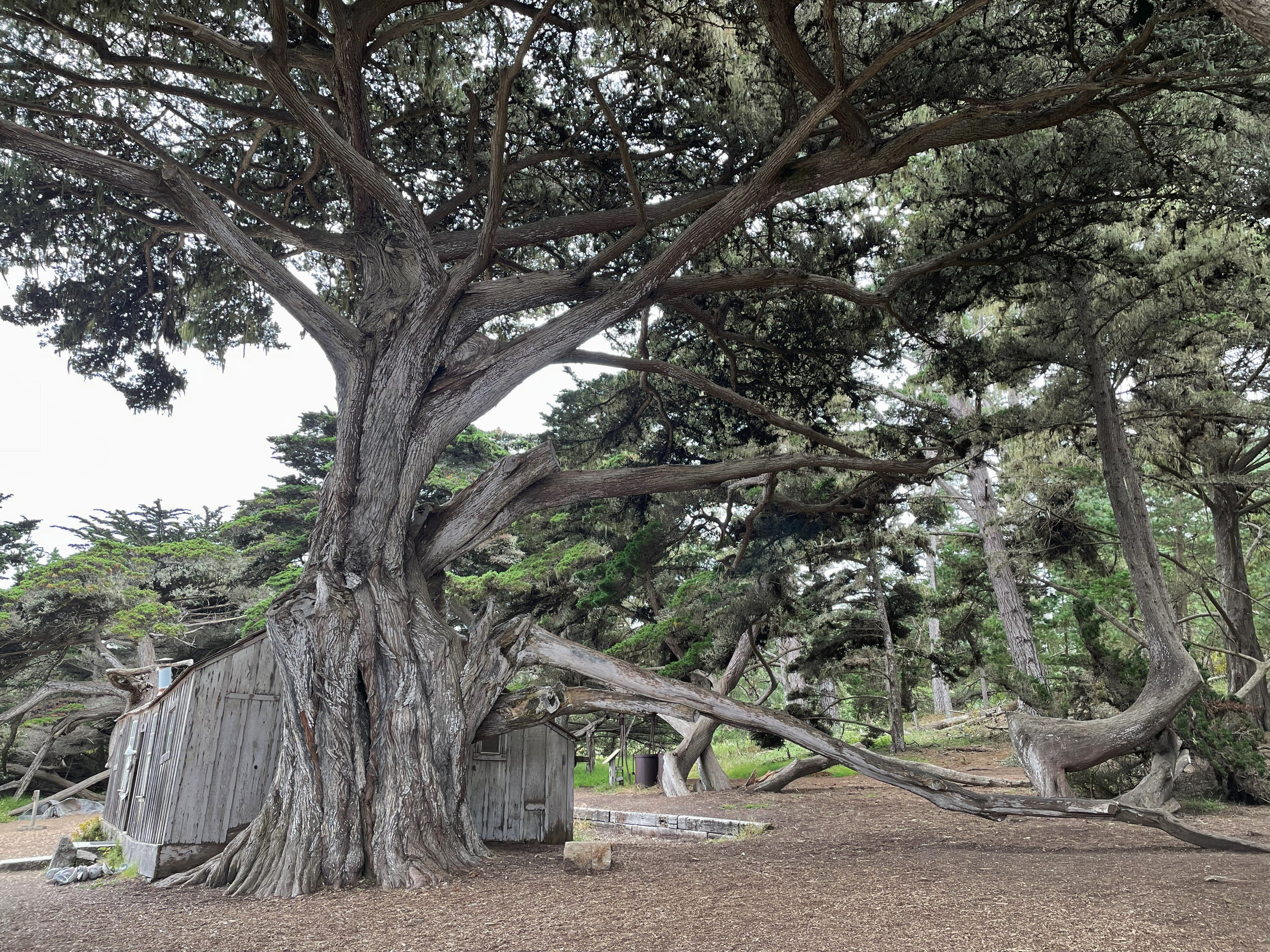
Monterey cypress tree next to Whalers Cabin

The historic Whalers Cabin at Whaler's Cove was constructed in the 1850s to house Chinese and later Japanese fishermen. The Chinese used locally sourced pine and redwood for siding. The floor was originally dirt. The floor joists are supported by six whale vertebrae that rest on granite blocks quarried nearby. Originally, the floor was packed earth. There were originally about 10 cabins around the cove. The cabin may have been used by Portuguese whalers from the Azores, who harpooned whales off the coast and hauled their carcasses onshore at the cove. The Carmel Whaling Company operated from 1862 to 1879. From 1854 to the end of shore-based whaling in about 1900, there were only 16 shore whaling stations in California, with about 300 men involved. When less expensive kerosene oil was introduced in about 1880, whaling fell off. Whaling was briefly reintroduced by the Japanese Whaling Company from 1898 to 1900.

When the last resident moved out of the cabin in 1983, a park docent suggested turning the cabin into a museum. Improvements added after the Chinese era, like fiberboard walls and ceiling, wiring, and pipes were removed. Docents contacted descendants of the families who lived and worked at the cove to solicit artifact contributions. California state parks exhibit specialists built displays around the donations. It is the only building of this era that has been preserved. It houses the Whaling Station Museum dedicated to the cultural history of the point. The museum also highlights the history of Point Lobos, including plans at the turn of the 20th century to develop the area for densely packed residences and its appearances in cinema.

== History ==
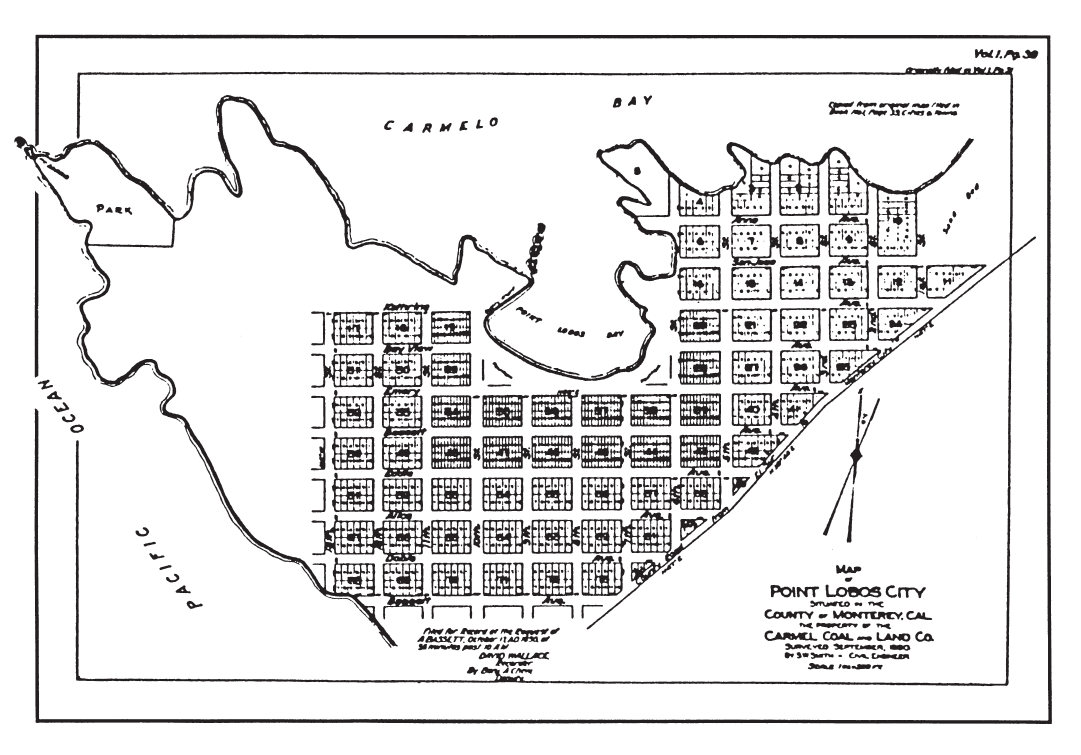
Plot map of planned Point Lobos City, September 1890

The Ohlone people harvested shellfish including abalone from the waters around Point Lobos. Evidence has been found of a long-term village named Ichxenta, in a meadow near San Jose Creek adjacent to Point Lobos, that indicates the natives inhabited the area for about 2,500 years. The village meadow is currently known as the Polo Field. There are 19 midden sites within Point Lobos and five sites containing mortar holes used by the natives for grinding acorns and seeds.

It is likely that Sebastián Vizcaíno or some of his soldiers, who camped near the mouth of the Carmel River in 1602–03, may have visited the area to the south. Gaspar de Portolà and his exploring party camped at San Jose Creek in October 1769. Sergeant Jose Francisco Ortega conducted a study of the coast south of the Carmel River. In about 1770, Spanish vaqueros from nearby Carmel Mission ran large herds of cattle in the area near Point Lobos.

Ichxenta was likely occupied until near the end of the Carmel Mission era, when the native population was decimated by disease, starvation, overwork, torture, and forced assimilation.

=== Spanish and Mexican era ===
Governor Juan Bautista Alvarado granted Rancho San Jose y Sur Chiquito, two square leagues of land, in 1839 to Marcelino Escobar, Alcalde of Monterey, Alta California. The grant was from the south side of Carmel River, including Point Lobos, 11 miles (18 km) south to Palo Colorado Canyon.

Two of Escobar's sons, Juan and Agustin, obtained possession of the rancho shortly afterward, and sold it on August 26, 1841, to Doňa Maria Josefa de Abrego, who held power of attorney for her husband José Abrego to buy and sell land. She paid $250, one-half in silver, and one-half in gold, or about three cents per acre.

Ownership of Point Lobos was later complicated by the fact that when Juan and Augustin Escobar sold the rancho to Josefa de Abrego in 1841, they did not obtain permission from their multiple brothers and sisters. The siblings later contested the sale.

Under somewhat mysterious circumstances, on January 16, 1843, Maria Abrego deeded the rancho to a group of about 10 soldiers from the Monterey Presidio. Records confirm the soldiers paid nothing, and a legend attached to the transfer says a gambler lost a rancho in a card game. Her husband was known for his gambling habit. On June 7, 1844, the soldiers turned the Rancho over to their superior officer, Colonel José Castro, former Governor Alvarado's brother-in-law.

After the Mexican–American War, Mexico ceded California to the United States. The 1848 Treaty of Guadalupe Hidalgo provided that the land grants would be honored. But the Land Act of 1851 required owners to prove their ownership. Castro filed a claim on February 2, 1853, but grew impatient with the outcome and sold the land in 1854 to Joseph S. Emery and Abner Bassett for $700, leaving to them the legal fight for ownership. The commission denied Castro's claim on August 28, 1855. Castro died in 1860. Emery and Bassett appealed the court's ruling. Bassett died in 1874, leaving his undivided one-half interest to his wife and eight children. Their half of the rancho was appraised at $15,000.

In 1880, a lawsuit was filed in United States District Court to resolve the conflicting claims of more than two dozen putative property owners and squatters. On June 5, 1882, subject to confirmation of the original claim by Castro, the judges divided Escobar's original land grant into 34 parcels. Later that year, Castro's original claim was validated by the court. The title was confirmed on December 24, 1885, and President Grover Cleveland signed the land patent on May 4, 1888, 35 years after Castro's initial filing. All of the 34 claims from the 1880 lawsuit were invalidated as a result.

=== Industrial period ===
In 1851 a Chinese sailor, Quock Junk, ran aground at Point Lobos. He was rescued by members of the Ohlone tribe. He was later joined by four or five other Chinese families who built cottages at Whaler's Cove. They became the first commercial fishermen at the point.

On September 22, 1853, the Point Lobos lighthouse was linked by telegraph to San Francisco. The link was primarily used to transmit maritime and weather information. From 1854 to 1858, a granite quarry was operated at what was later named Whaler's Cove. The stone was used to build the Old Monterey Jail, San Francisco Mint, portions of Fort Point, and buildings on the Navy's installation at Mare Island Naval Shipyard.

In 1862, Antonio Victorine, a Portuguese whaler from the Azores, arrived at Point Lobos, following the whale population. About fifty to seventy family members lived at Whaler's Cove. The men spotted whales from Whaler's Knoll and then rowed off shore about 1 mile (1.6 km) in 24-foot boats to harpoon them. They towed the whales back to Pt. Lobos to flense and harvest the blubber. They then towed the carcasses back out to sea.

=== Coal mining ===
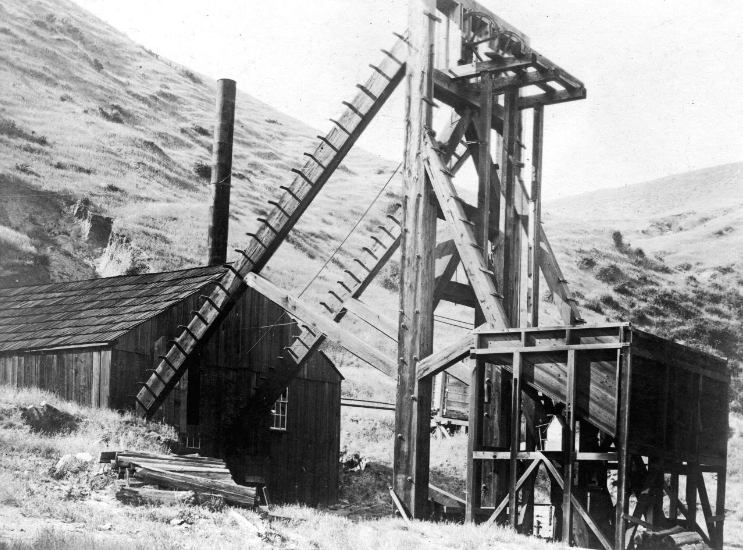
Headstock of the Carmelo Land and Coal Company mine in upper Malpaso Canyon, south of Carmel, California, in 1895

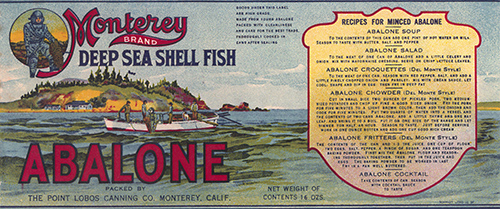
Label from a can of abalone produced by the Point Lobos Canning Company in 1905

In 1874, a seam of low grade bituminous coal was found in upper Malpaso Canyon, southeast of Pt Lobos. On September 6, 1888, shortly after the patent for Rancho San Jose y Sur Chiquito was approved, almost all of the owners banded together to form the Carmelo Land and Coal Company. In exchange for shares in the company, they sold their interest in the land for $1. A mine was dug into the mountain near Malpaso Creek, and the coal was transported on ore carts via a tramway to a dog-hole port at Coal Chute Point, opposite the Chinese settlement at Whaler's Cove. The deep water allowed the workers to use the chute to deliver the coal directly to coastal steamers.

In 1890, Emory and Bassett's heirs subdivided Point Lobos into 1,000 parcels. They began selling lots for $25 to $50 for a new town they initially named Point Lobos City, but later renamed Carmelito. The lack of a bridge across the Carmel River and two national economic recessions during the 1890s combined to severely restrict sales. The outer portion of the point was reserved as the Point Lobos Park.

In 1897, Alexander MacMillan Allan, a successful engineer from Pennsylvania, was hired to improve the coal mine operation. When he found the coal mine could not produce a profit, he purchased 640 acres (260 ha) of Point Lobos from the Carmelo Land and Coal Company in 1898. A Japanese fisherman, Gennosuke Kodani, was already harvesting abalone from the area, a valuable delicacy in Japan. Allan partnered with him to build the Point Lobos Canning Company, which they operated until 1928. Allan decided to move the remainder of his family from Oakland to Point Lobos.

Allan added a sand and gravel mining operation to the Abalone cannery. In 1899 he had a narrow gauge railroad built from nearby San Jose Beach to Coal Chute Point to transport sand for shipment by sea to glass manufacturers in Alameda. Sand mining continued through 1954. Allan established the Point Lobos Dairy at the mouth of San Jose Creek which was operated from 1903 until 1954. He also became a successful race track architect and built the Santa Anita, Tanforan and Bay Meadows race tracks. One member of the family sold a portion they inherited to form the Carmel Meadows subdivision.

=== Tollgate installed ===
In 1899, Allan and his wife Satie, who grew to appreciate the natural beauty of the point, were concerned about the increasing number of visitors. People had been visiting the point for many years to see the rare Monterey Cypress trees and enjoy the scenic coastline. The Allan family put up toll gates, prohibited camping, and charged visitors 50 cents a vehicle (about $10 today) to enter the point. Allan bought many of the residential lots that had been subdivided and later got the entire subdivision removed from the county record.

=== State interest in land ===
Scientists reported to the government that the Carmel area including Point Lobos was the "most picturesque spot on the Pacific Coast". In 1925, Point Lobos figured prominently in discussions for inclusion in the new state park system. Members of the Sierra Club and the Save the Redwoods League discussed preserving Point Lobos and Cypress Point as national parks or reserves. Duncan McDuffie of the Save the Redwoods League hired the internationally known landscape architect Frederick Law Olmsted Jr. to research Point Lobos and report on the areas most noteworthy of preservation. Olmsted's report described Point Lobos as "the most outstanding example on the coast of California of picturesque rock and surf scenery in combination with unique vegetation, including typical Monterey cypress". Point Lobos gained the attention of the newly established California State Park system, who considered taking the land using eminent domain. Allan initially resisted the idea of making the land a public park. The family persuaded the state to wait until Allan died.

=== Land sold ===
On February 8, 1933, three years after Allan's death, the Allan family sold 348 acres (141 ha) to the State of California for $631,000 (equivalent to $12,444,401 in 2025). The state promptly set about erasing evidence of human intrusion on the land, removing man-made structures like the abalone cannery, the railroad used to haul sand, and a number of homes and shacks, excepting a single Whalers Cabin. The Allan family donated an additional 15 acres (6.1 ha) to the state of cypress-covered headlands at the western tip of the point as a memorial grove to Alexander and Satie Morgan Allan. The state added another 48 acres (19 ha) in 1975, expanding the reserve to almost 400 acres (160 ha). Following acquisition, California State Parks instituted long-term management policies to restore native habitats and preserve cultural heritage sites, marking the reserve’s transition from an industrial area into a protected state natural reserve.

=== World War II use ===
At the beginning of World War II, a U.S. Army Coastal Defense Squad used the Whalers Cabin at Whaler's Cove for its headquarters. From 1942 to 1944, the cove was the site of a 4th Air Force Long-Range Radar site. Tents were set up to accommodate 90 men below Rat Hill. In July and August 1943, the U.S. Army established a training school for the 543rd Engineer Boat and Shore Regiment, 3rd Engineer Special Brigade, at Whaler's Cove at Point Lobos. The unit found that the cove was an ideal harbor for anchoring and maintaining their boats. The unit was later involved in 62 landings in the southwest Pacific.

=== Modern changes ===
The Allan family retained the land to the east of Highway 1. Eunice Allan Riley, one of Alexander's three daughters, repurchased the last subdivided lots in the 1950s. In 1960, 750 acres (300 ha) underwater acres were added as the first marine reserve in the United States. The marine reserve was designated an ecological reserve in 1973, and in 1992, was added to the Monterey Bay National Marine Sanctuary, the largest in the nation.

== In popular culture ==
A large number of movies have been made in or around Point Lobos.

- Valley of the Moon (1914)
- The Love Light (1921)
- Foolish Wives (1922)
- The Eleventh Hour (1923)
- Greed (1924)
- The Iron Mask (1929)
- Evangeline (1929)
- Daddy Long Legs (1931)
- Paddy, The Next Best Thing (1933)
- He was her Man (1934)
- Treasure Island (1934)
- Captain January (1936)
- Conquest (1937)
- Maid of Salem (1937)
- Rebecca (1939)
- Edge of Darkness (1943)
- Lassie Come Home (1943)
- Vertigo (1958)
- The Sandpiper (1965)
- The Graduate (1967)
- Turner and Hooch (1989).

== See also ==
- Point Lobos Ranch
- Asilomar State Beach
- List of beaches in California
- List of California state parks
- Edward Weston
