= Woodland Auto Display =

Automobile museum in Paso Robles, California

Coordinates: 35.6655°N 120.6201°W

The Woodland Automobile Display is a museum in Paso Robles, California, which showcases vintage, classic, and historic vehicles. The museum's primary focus is racing vehicles, with a concentration of Sprint, Modified, Super Modified and Midget race cars. The Woodland Auto Display is located on the grounds of the Estrella Warbird Museum at the Paso Robles Municipal Airport in central California.

== History ==
Founded by vintner and car aficionado Richard "Dick" Woodland, the Woodland Auto Display was opened to the public on July 19, 2009 (16 years ago). Originally just under 5,000 square feet (460 m^{2}) of display area, by 2015, it had grown to approximately 17,000 square feet (1,600 m^{2}) of covered display area. Another 7,000 square feet (650 m^{2}) of restoration shop is located off site.

== Collection ==
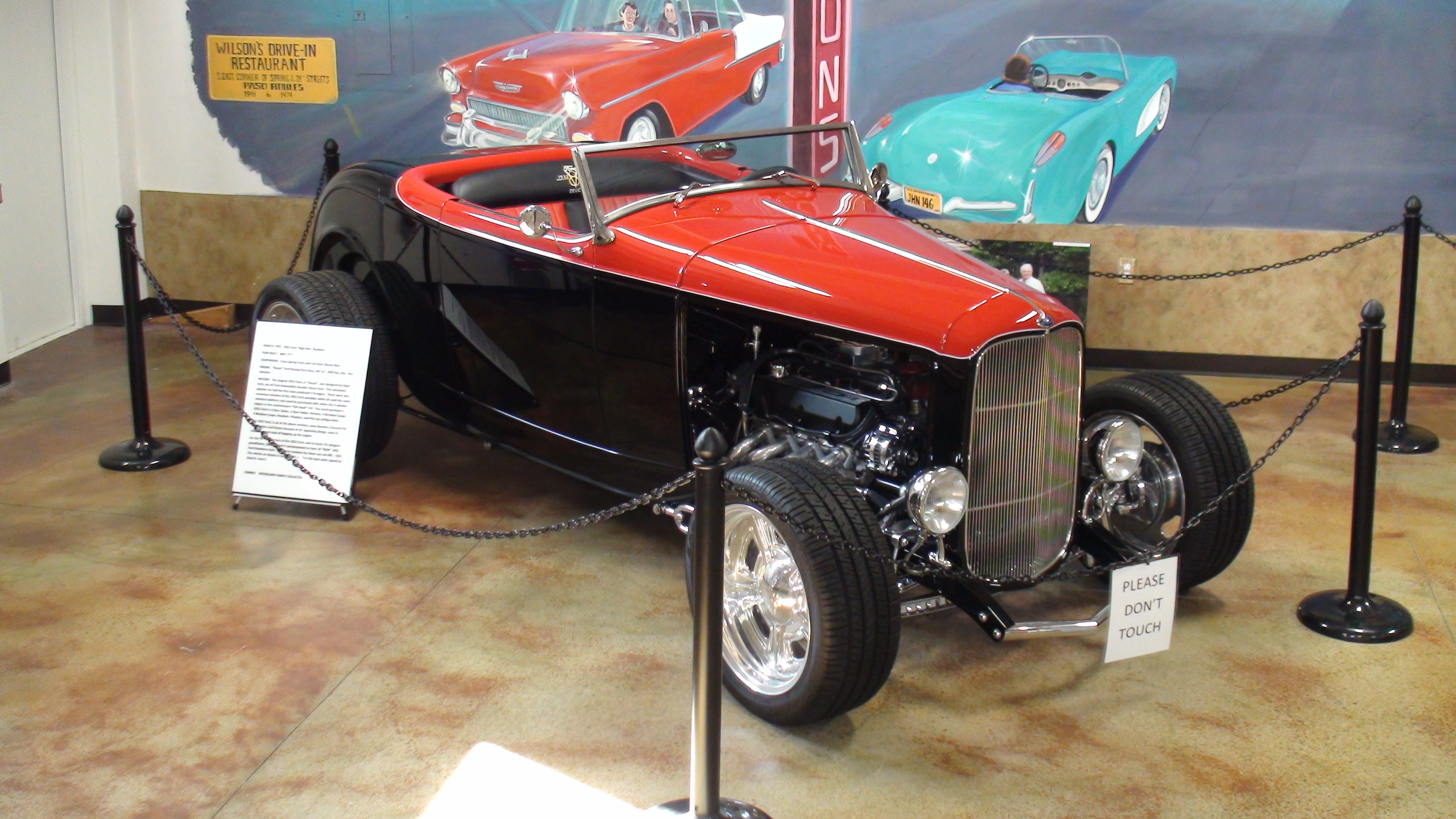
1932 Ford Deuce Coupe

Most of the vehicles on display have been restored to the original condition as when first built. Some of the cars came off the track and required little to no restoration, while some were restored to pristine condition after being rolled, wrecked, worn out or demolished. The collection also includes numerous well known vintage and classic automobiles, along with preserved historical motorcycles. The collection includes a Mercedes Benz 300 Gull Wing, a Jaguar XKE Roadster, 1932 Ford Roadster (serial # 00007), a 1932 Ford Victoria, the 2005 Ford GT 500 and a 1948 Mercury Coupe.
