= Estrella Warbird Museum =

Aviation museum in San Luis Obispo County, California, United States

Estrella Warbirds Museum

- Location within California
- Established: 1992
- Location: Paso Robles, California
- Coordinates: 35.664°N 120.620°W
- Type: Military aviation museum
- Founders: Gary Corippo; Glen Thomson
- Website: ewarbirds.org

The Estrella Warbirds Museum is an aviation museum dedicated to the restoration and preservation of military aircraft, vehicles, and memorabilia. The museum is located at Paso Robles Municipal Airport in central California and is named after Estrella Army Airfield. In July, 2009, the museum opened an automobile display featuring classic racing cars, The Woodland Auto Display.

== History ==
The museum began in 1993, when it acquired and moved three buildings from a former almond orchard to the airport. Originally founded as the Estrella Squadron of the Commemorative Air Force, it became independent in 2000.

A collection of military vehicles was donated by Herman Pfauter and in 2015 it was placed on display in a new 5,000 sq ft (460 m^{2}) building called the Red Ball Express Motor Pool.

The museum acquired an OH-23C, O-1A and U-6A from Camp San Luis Obispo in February 2025.

== Facilities ==
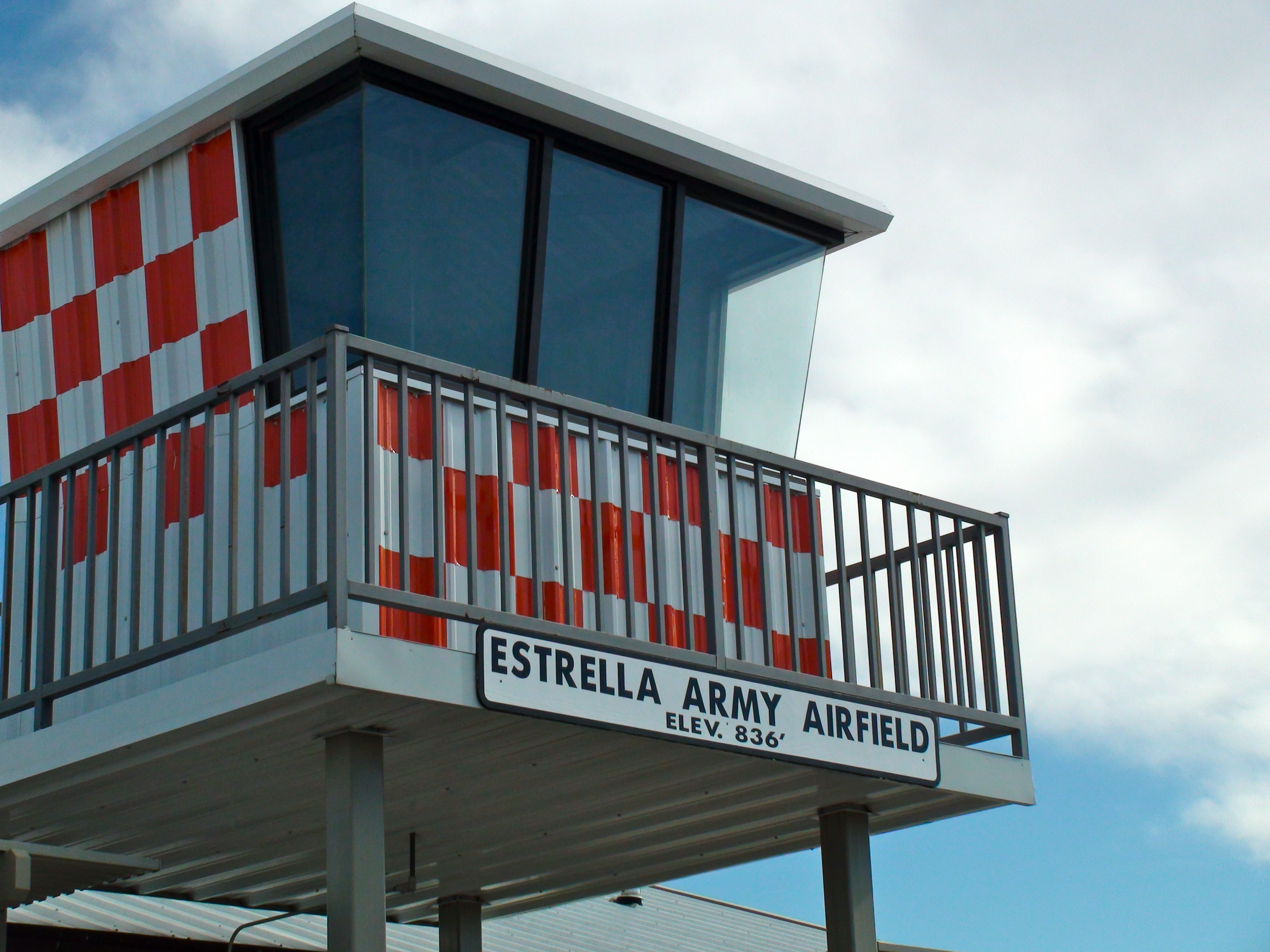
Control Tower at the museum entrance

The museum is made up of the Hangar One, Al Schade Restoration Hangar, Thompson Hall, Freedom Hall, Brooks Building, Woodland Auto Display, Hind Pavilion, and Pfauter Building.

== Exhibits ==
Exhibits at the museum include a radio room and a flight simulator.

== Collection ==
=== Aircraft ===
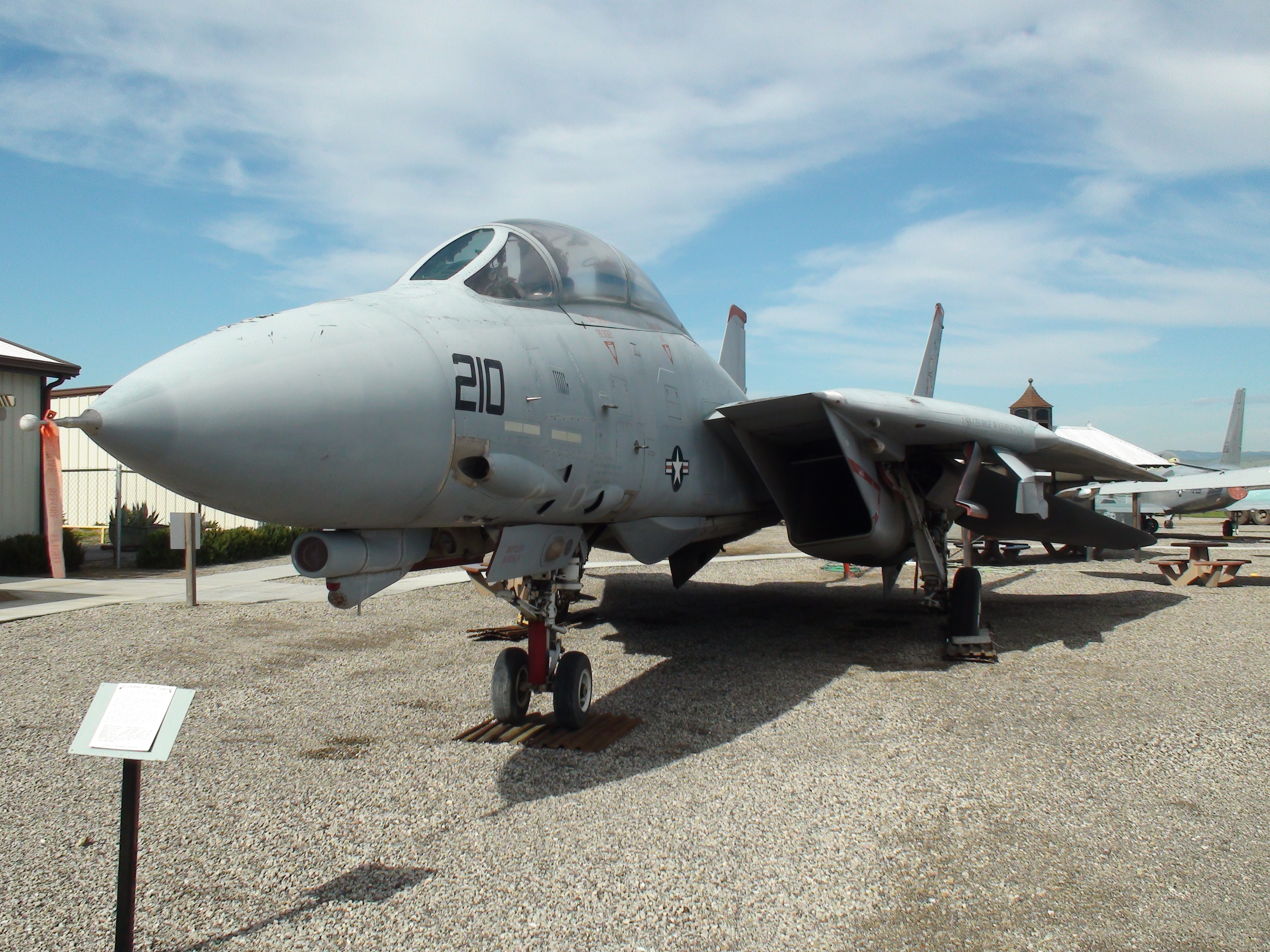
Grumman F-14B Tomcat

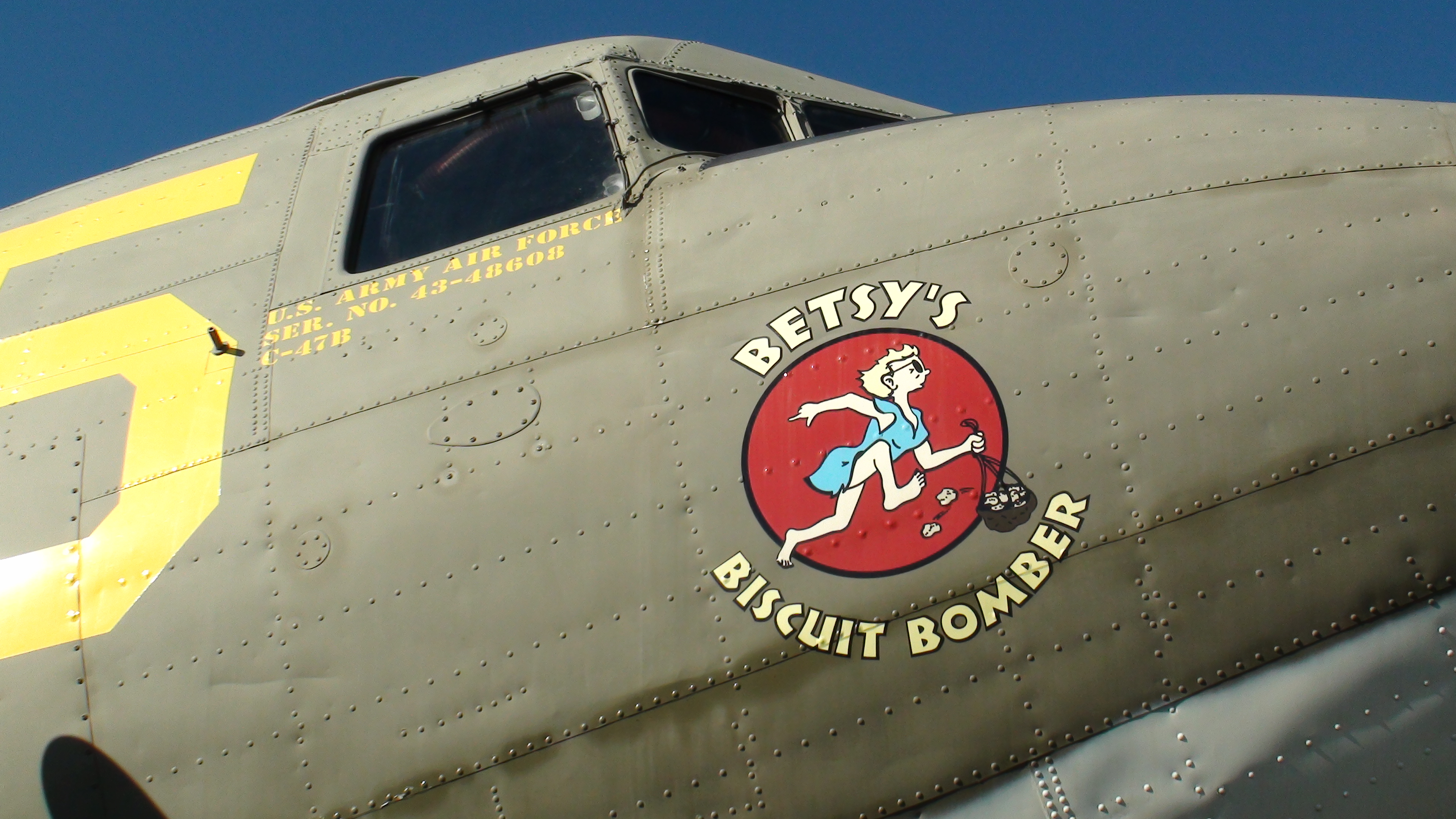
Douglas C-47B Skytrain

- Aermacchi MB-326
- Aeronca L-16
- Beechcraft T-34 Mentor
- Beechcraft T-34 Mentor
- Bell UH-1D Iroquois
- Cessna T-37B Tweet
- Douglas A-4A Skyhawk
- Douglas C-47B Skytrain
- Douglas ERA-3B Skywarrior – cockpit
- Douglas TA-4J Skyhawk
- Focke-Wulf FWP.149D
- Fouga CM.170 Magister
- General Atomics Gnat-750
- General Dynamics F-16B Fighting Falcon
- Grumman A-6E Intruder
- Grumman F-14B Tomcat
- Grumman F9F-8P Cougar
- Grumman US-2D Tracker
- Gyrodyne QH-50D DASH
- LTV NA-7C Corsair II
- Lockheed P2V-5F Neptune
- Lockheed T-33A Shooting Star
- Lockheed TF-104G Starfighter
- McDonnell Douglas F-4S Phantom II
- McDonnell Douglas F-4S Phantom II – cockpit
- North American QF-86F Sabre
- North American T-28B Trojan
- North American SNJ-5C Texan
- North American Rockwell OV-10A Bronco
- Northrop AQM-38
- Northrop F-5E Tiger II
- Radioplane MQM-33
- Ryan BQM-34S Firebee
- Saab A 32A Lansen
- Saab J 35 Draken
- Sikorsky UH-19D Chickasaw
- Sikorsky UH-34D Choctaw
- Stinson L-5E Sentinel
- Stinson Reliant I
- Taylor J-2
- UTVA Aero 3
- Vought F-8K Crusader

=== Armament and ordnance ===
As of January 2019, the following armament and ordnance were on exhibit at the museum.

- Bofors 40mm anti-aircraft gun
- M40 105 mm Recoilless Rifle
- General Dynamics M60A3 main battle tank
- Quad 50 cal M2 Heavy Barrel Machine Gun
- United Defense M901 ITV anti-tank vehicle
- 57mm M1 anti-tank gun
- ZPU-1 14.5 mm anti-aircraft gun

=== Military vehicles ===
As of December 2019, the following military vehicles were on exhibit at the museum.

- AMC Mighty Mite Jeep
- Diamond REO M52
- Dodge M37 WC Truck
- Dodge M43 Ambulance
- Dodge WC4 Power Wagon
- Excelsior Welbike Mark 1
- FMC Landing Vehicle Tracked LVPT-5
- FMC Armored Personnel Carrier M113A3
- Ford GPW Jeep
- Ford GTBA G622 Burma Jeep
- Ford Model T Ambulance
- Ford MUTT Jeep
- General Motors DUKW 1942 Utility Vehicle AWD
- Higgins LCVP Landing Craft
- IHC M35 Series Troop Carrier
- M35A1 Armored Gun Truck
- M60A3 Tank
- Alvis Saracen FV-603 armored personnel carrier
- White M2 Half Track
- Willys M274 Mule with 105 mm Recoilless Rifle
- Willys M38A1 Jeep

=== Missiles ===
As of January 2019, the following missiles were on exhibit at the museum.

- Hughes AIM-4 Falcon air-to-air missile
- Martin HGM-25A Titan I intercontinental ballistic missile
- Raytheon AIM-7 Sparrow air-to-air missile
- Raytheon AIM-9 Sidewinder air-to-air missile
- Raytheon AIM-54C Phoenix air-to-air missile
- Raytheon AIM-120 AMRAAM air-to-air missile

=== Other exhibits ===
- Link Trainer

== Events ==
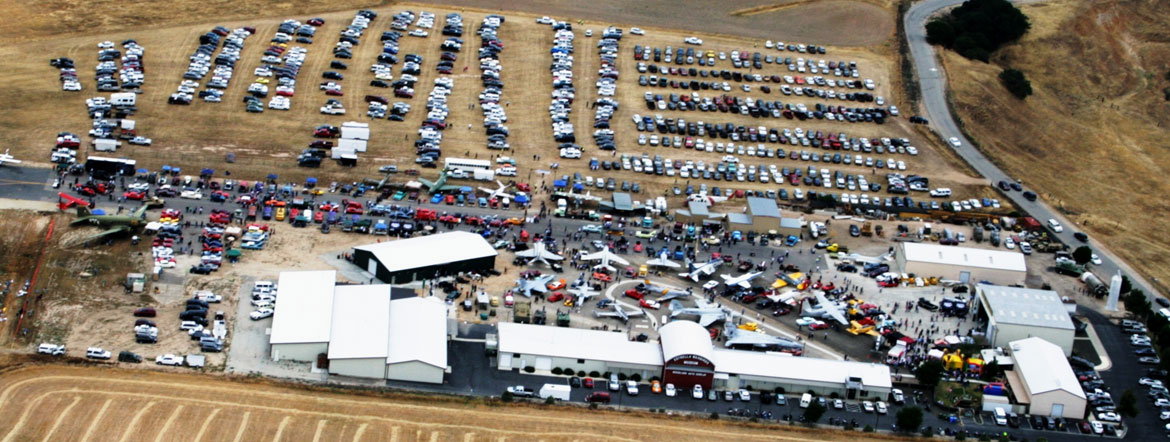
Warbirds, Wings & Wheels

The museum holds an fundraiser event every year called Warbirds, Wings and Wheels. The Paso Robles Taco Fest has been held at the museum annually since 2023.

== See also ==
- List of aerospace museums
