= USNS Mission San Miguel =

Type T2-SE-A2 tanker

History

United States
- Laid down: 11 August 1943
- Launched: 31 October 1943
- Acquired: 4 November 1947
- In service: 4 November 1947
- Out of service: 8 October 1957
- Fate: Ran aground, 8 October 1957
- Stricken: 20 December 1957

General characteristics
- Displacement: 21,880 tons full; 5,532 tons light
- Length: 524 ft (160 m)
- Beam: 68 ft (21 m)
- Draft: 30 ft (9 m)
- Propulsion: Turbo-electric, single screw, 6,000 hp (4.5 MW)
- Speed: 16.5 knots (31 km/h)
- Complement: 52 mariners

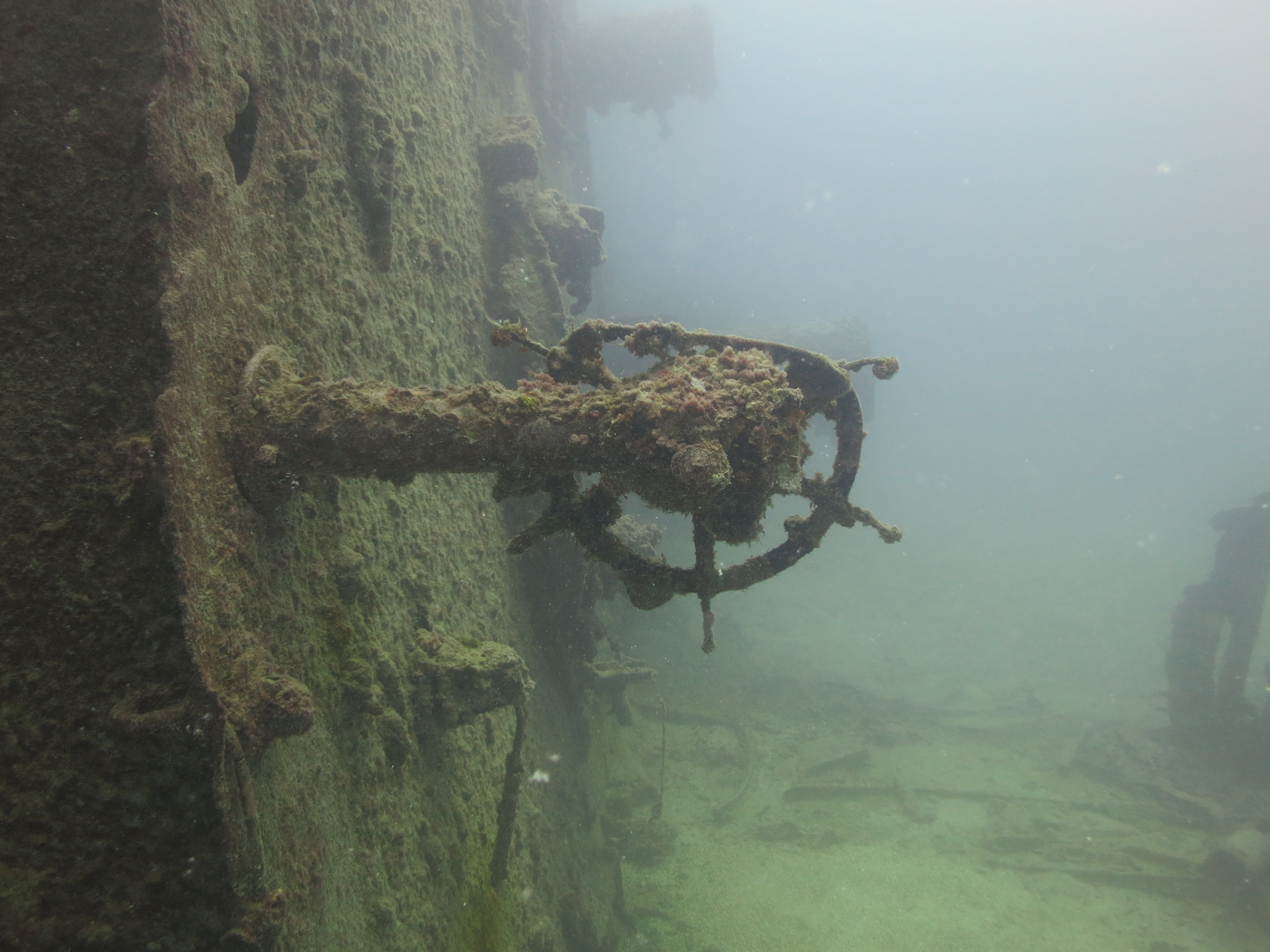
Wreck of the USNS ship Mission San Miguel. All hands were evacuated before it sank in 1957 in Maro reef. It was rediscovered in 2015

SS Mission San Miguel was a Type T2-SE-A2 tanker built for the United States Maritime Commission during World War II. After the war she was acquired by the United States Navy as USS Mission San Miguel (AO-129). Later the tanker transferred to the Military Sea Transportation Service as USNS Mission San Miguel (T-AO-129). She was a Mission Buenaventura-class oiler and was named for Mission San Miguel Arcángel, located in San Miguel, California.

== Career ==
Mission San Miguel was laid down 11 August 1943 under a Maritime Commission contract by Marine Ship Corporation, Sausalito, California; launched 31 October 1943; sponsored by Mrs. John W. Hardie; and delivered 19 February 1944. Chartered to Pacific Tankers, Inc. for operations, she spent the remainder of the war carrying fuel to Allied forces overseas. She remained in this capacity until 20 May 1946 when she was returned to the Maritime Commission and laid up in the Maritime Reserve Fleet at Mobile, Alabama.

Acquired by the Navy on 4 November 1947, she was chartered to American Pacific Steamship Company for operations on the same date, and placed under the operational control of the Naval Transportation Service as Mission San Miguel (AO-129). Transferred to the operational control of the newly created Military Sea Transportation Service on 1 October 1949, she was redesignated USNS Mission San Miguel (T-AO-129). She served with MSTS until 22 March 1950, when she was taken out of service and laid up in the U.S. Navy's Pacific Reserve Fleet at San Diego, California. Her stay in reserve was short, for on 24 July she was once again placed in service by MSTS to aid supporting U.S. troops in Korea. She served with MSTS until 28 May 1954, when she was placed in the San Diego group Pacific Reserve Fleet for laying up. Reactivated and placed in service with MSTS 1 November 1956, she served until 8 October 1957 when she ran aground on Maro Reef in the Hawaiian Islands while running at full speed and in ballast. When she began to go down by the stern, USNS LST-664 took off Mission San Miguel's crew despite darkness, 8-foot seas, and numerous reefs. Declared unfit for further naval service and salvage, she was struck from the Naval Vessel Register on 20 December 1957.

The wreck of the ship was re-discovered on 3 August 2015. The wreck of Mission San Miguel is in Papahānaumokuākea Marine National Monument, a marine protected area. Researchers will map and study the wreck in situ.

Wreck location: 25°22.3′N 170°34.1′W
