= Mission San Miguel Arcángel =

18th-century Spanish mission in California

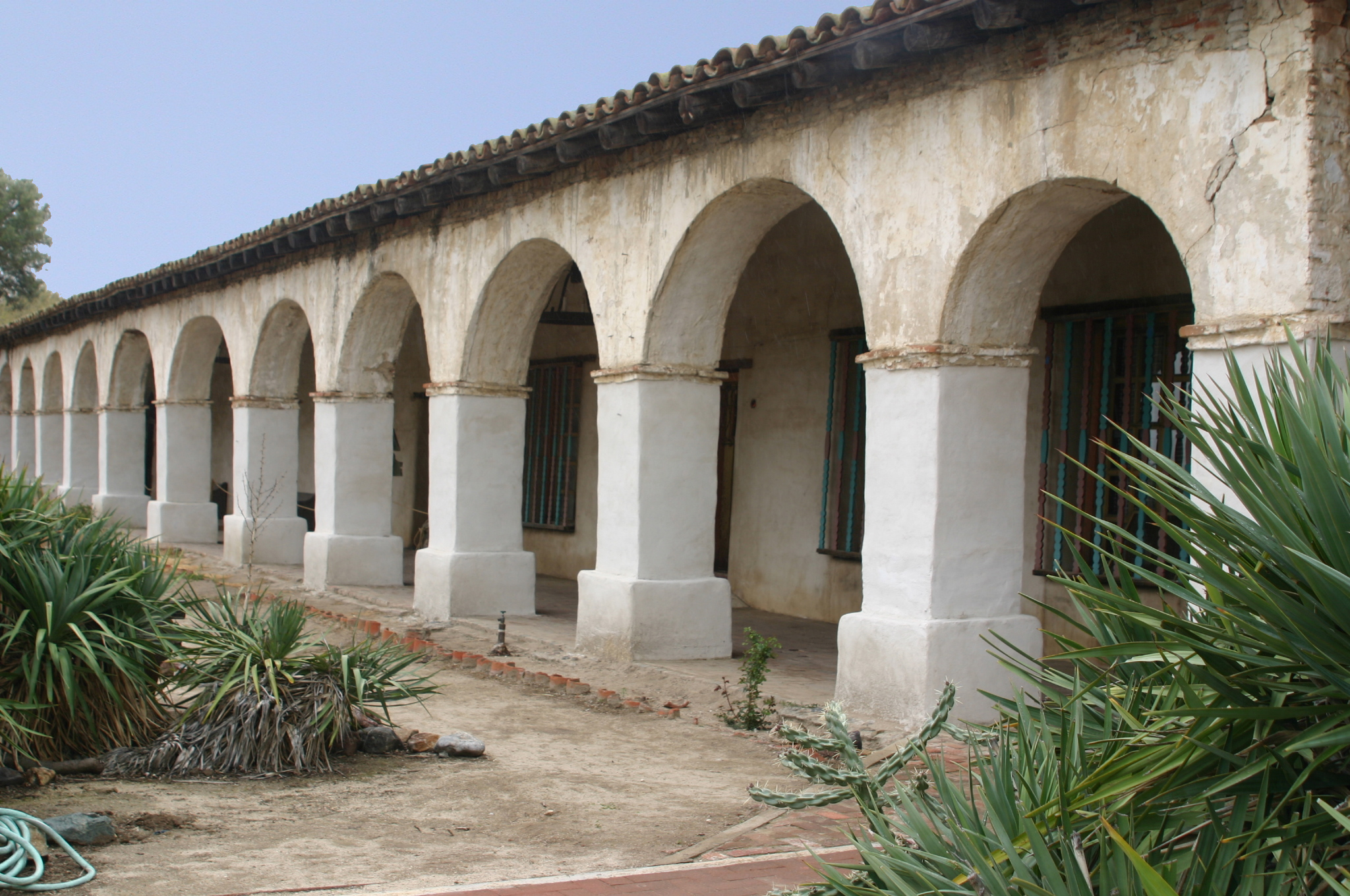
- San Miguel's various-sized arches are a noted feature of this mission

- Location within California Location within the United States
- Location: 775 Mission Street; San Miguel, San Luis Obispo County, California 93451
- Coordinates: 35°44′41″N 120°41′53″W
- Name as founded: La Misión del Gloriosísimo Príncipe Arcángel, Señor San Miguel
- English translation: The Mission of the Very Glorious Archangel Prince, Sir Saint Michael
- Patron: Saint Michael the Archangel
- Nicknames: "Mission on the Highway" ... "The Unretouched Mission"
- Founded: July 25, 1797
- Founded by: Father Fermín Lasuén
- Area: 0.4 acres (0.16 ha)
- Built: 1821
- Architectural style: Spanish/California Mission Style
- Founding Order: Sixteenth
- Military district: Third
- Native tribe(s) Spanish name(s): Salinan
- Native place name: Valica
- Baptisms: 2,471
- Marriages: 764
- Burials: 1,868
- Secularized: 1834
- Returned to the Church: 1859
- Governing body: Diocese of Monterey
- Current use: Parish Church

U.S. National Register of Historic Places
- Designated: July 14, 1971
- Reference no.: 71000191

U.S. National Historic Landmark
- Designated: March 20, 2006

California Historical Landmark
- Reference no.: #326

Website
- http://www.oldmissionsanmiguel.org/

Mission San Miguel Arcángel is a Spanish mission in San Miguel, California. It was established on July 25, 1797, by the Franciscan order, on a site chosen specifically due to the large number of Salinan Indians that inhabited the area, whom the Spanish priests wanted to evangelize.

The mission remains in use as a parish church of the Diocese of Monterey. After being closed to the public for six years due to the 2003 San Simeon earthquake, the church reopened on September 29, 2009. Inside the church are murals designed by Esteban Munras.

The mission was put on the National Register of Historic Places in 1971 and was named to a National Historic Landmark in 2006. Of California's missions, it is one that retains more than most of its layout and buildings, including a portion of its neophyte village.

== History ==
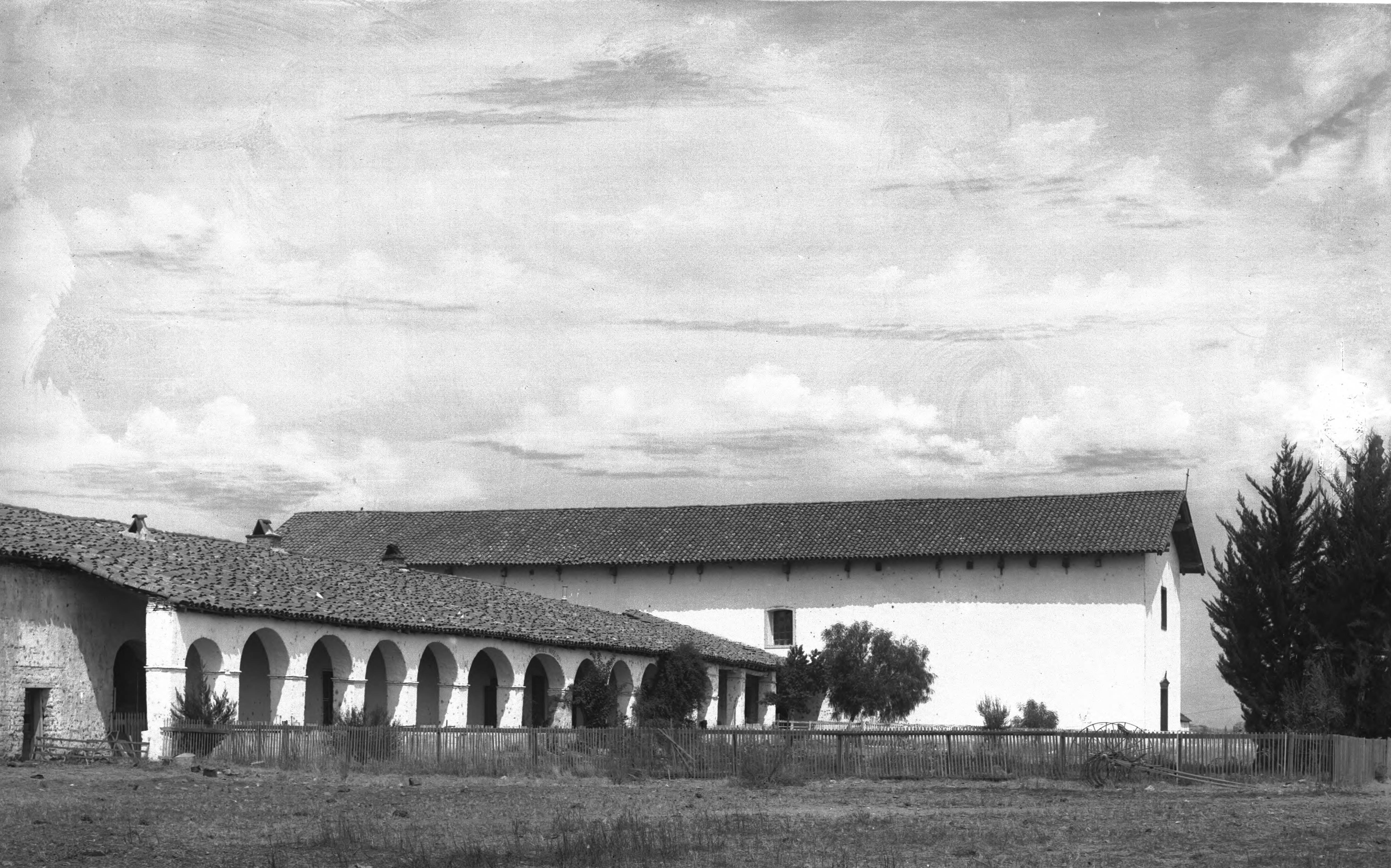
Mission San Miguel Arcángel around 1906

Father Fermín Lasuén and Father Buenaventura Sitjar founded the mission on July 25, 1797, making it the sixteenth California mission. Its location between Mission San Luis Obispo and Mission San Antonio de Padua provided a stop on the trip that had previously taken two days. A temporary wooden church was built with living quarters. The site was chosen as it was close to a Salinan Indian village called Vahca. In 1798 the small chapel was replaced. From 1816 to 1818 a new church was constructed with a tile roof and courtyard.

Mission San Miguel Arcángel land was sold off after the Mexican secularization act of 1833. The William Reed family lived in the buildings until 1848, when they were murdered by a band of thieves. The killers were tracked down by a posse in the foothills of Santa Barbara. Two thieves died in the ensuing battle, and the other three were tried and executed by firing squad. Upon secularization, the mission began to decay. Padre Abella, the last Franciscan at San Miguel, died in July, 1841.

In 1859 the U.S. government returned the mission to the Catholic Church. But with the buildings in poor condition, no priests were assigned to the mission; buildings were rented to some small businesses. In 1878 the Church reactivated the mission, and Rev. Philip Farrelly took up residence as First Pastor of Mission San Miguel. In 1928 the mission was returned to the Franciscan Padres, the same group who had founded the mission in 1797.

== Features ==
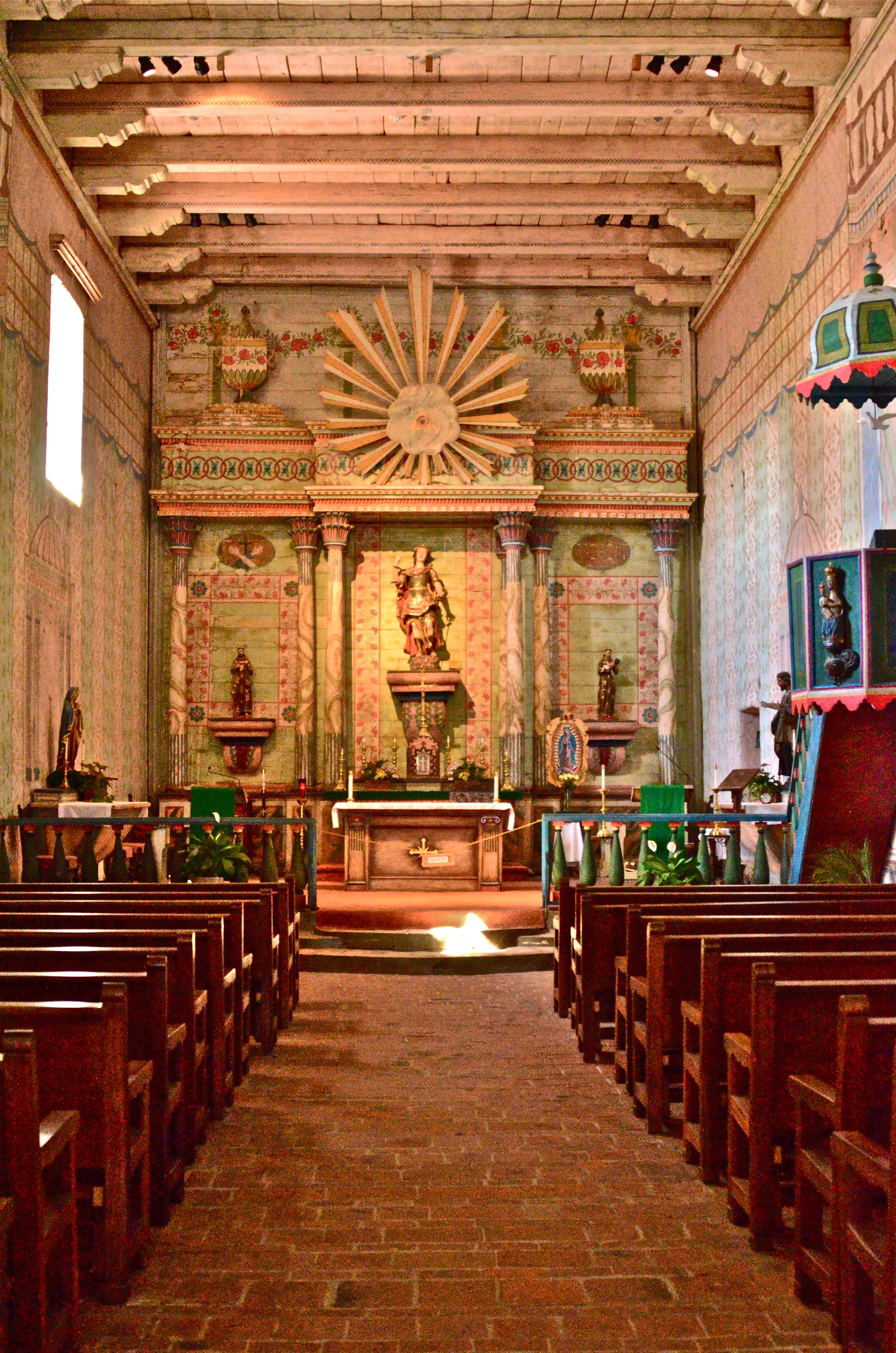
The interior of Mission San Miguel Arcángel is one of the best preserved of all the missions of California. It features murals executed by noted artist Esteban Munrás in the 1820s.

- The Mission Arcade, a series of 12 arches, is original. The variety of shapes and sizes was planned and the Mission was known for this arcade.
- The first chapel on the site was replaced within a year of its construction by a larger adobe chapel, which burned in the 1806 fire.
- The current mission church was built between 1816 and 1818. It is 144 feet (44 m) long, 27 feet (8.2 m) wide, and 40 feet (12 m) high.
- The cemetery adjacent to the church holds the remains of 2,249 Native Americans listed in the Mission's burial records.
- The painted walls inside the church are the original artwork by artist Esteban Munras and other Salinan artists.

== Mission bells ==
Bells were vitally important to daily life at any mission. The bells were rung at mealtimes, to call the Mission residents to work and to religious services, during births and funerals, to signal the approach of a ship or returning missionary, and at other times; novices were instructed in the intricate rituals associated with the ringing the mission bells.

== Associated structures ==
The Rios-Caledonia Adobe was built in 1835 just south of the San Miguel Mission as a home for the overseer of Mission lands. This historic site is well preserved with the original Inn and Stagecoach stop now a museum and small gift shop. A building was added in 1930 that is now a unique history research library. The grounds are maintained by San Luis Obispo County Parks with picnic sites and restrooms available.

The Historic Rios-Caledonia Adobe is a California Historical Landmark (#936) and is listed on the National Park Service's National Register of Historic Places (#71000190).

== Gallery ==
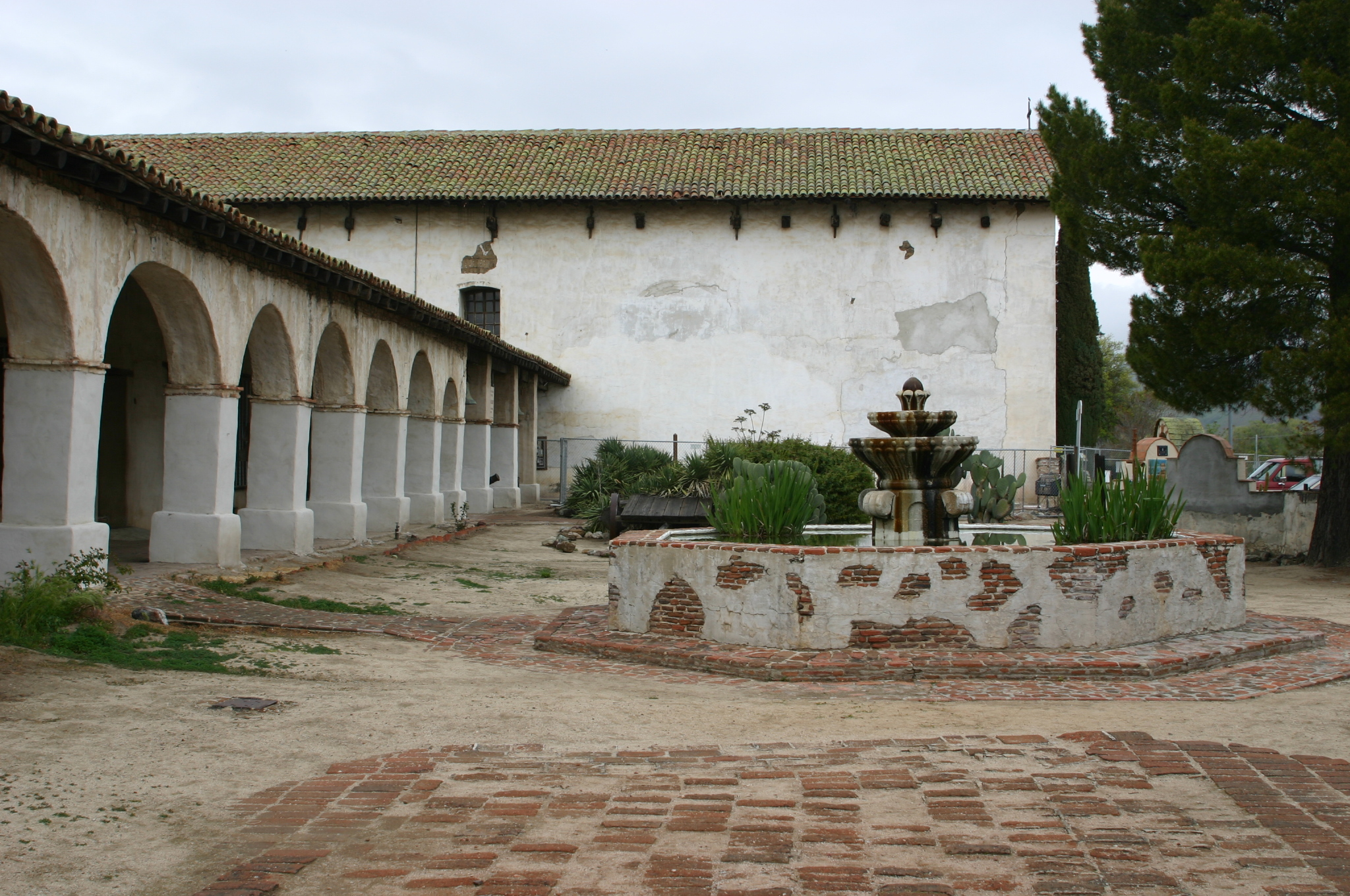
Mission plaza

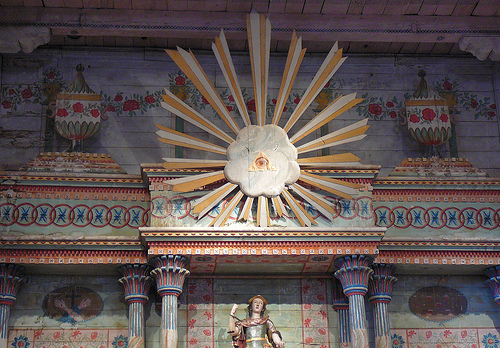
Ojo de Dios, above altar

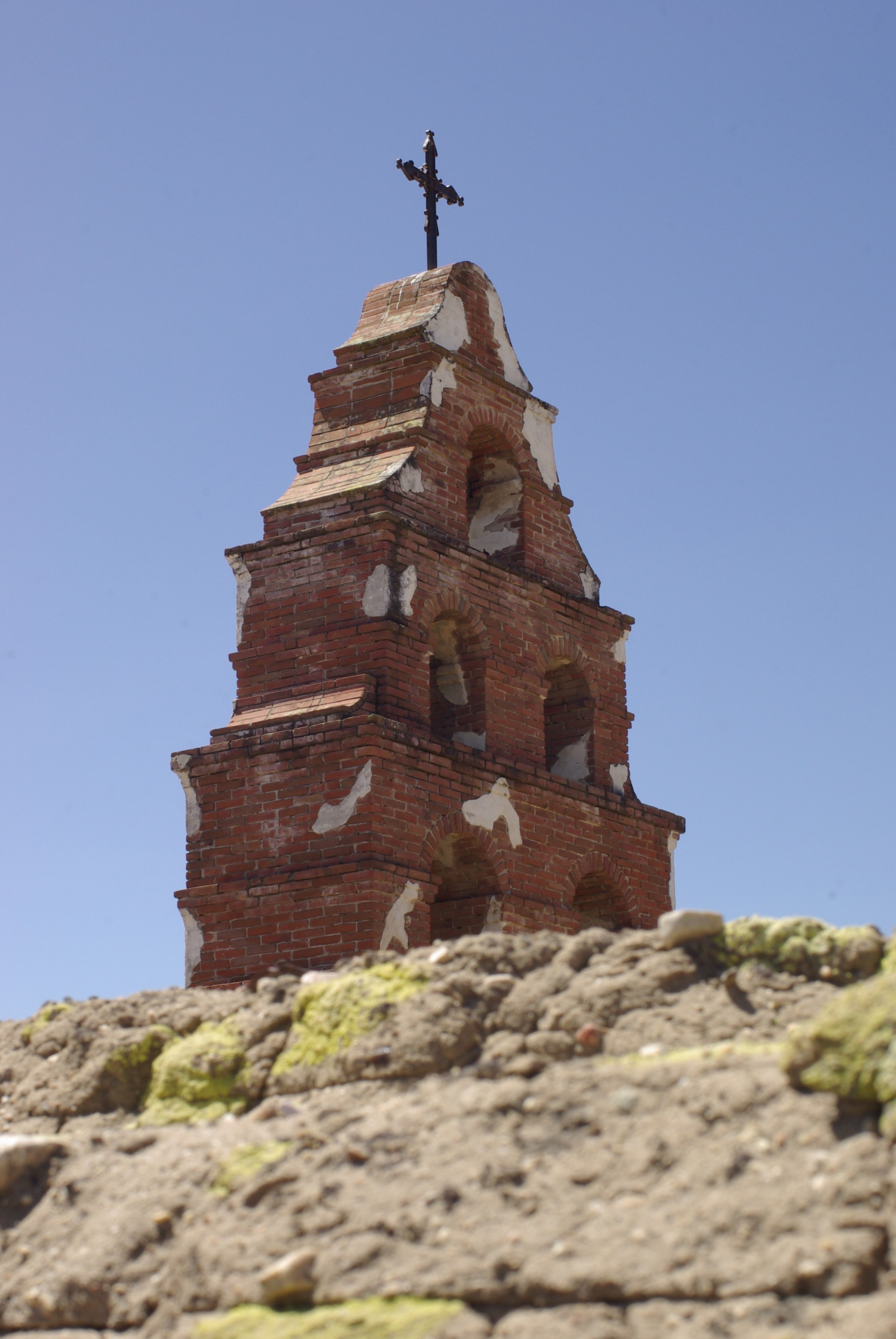
Adobe wall and bell tower at Mission San Miguel Arcangel

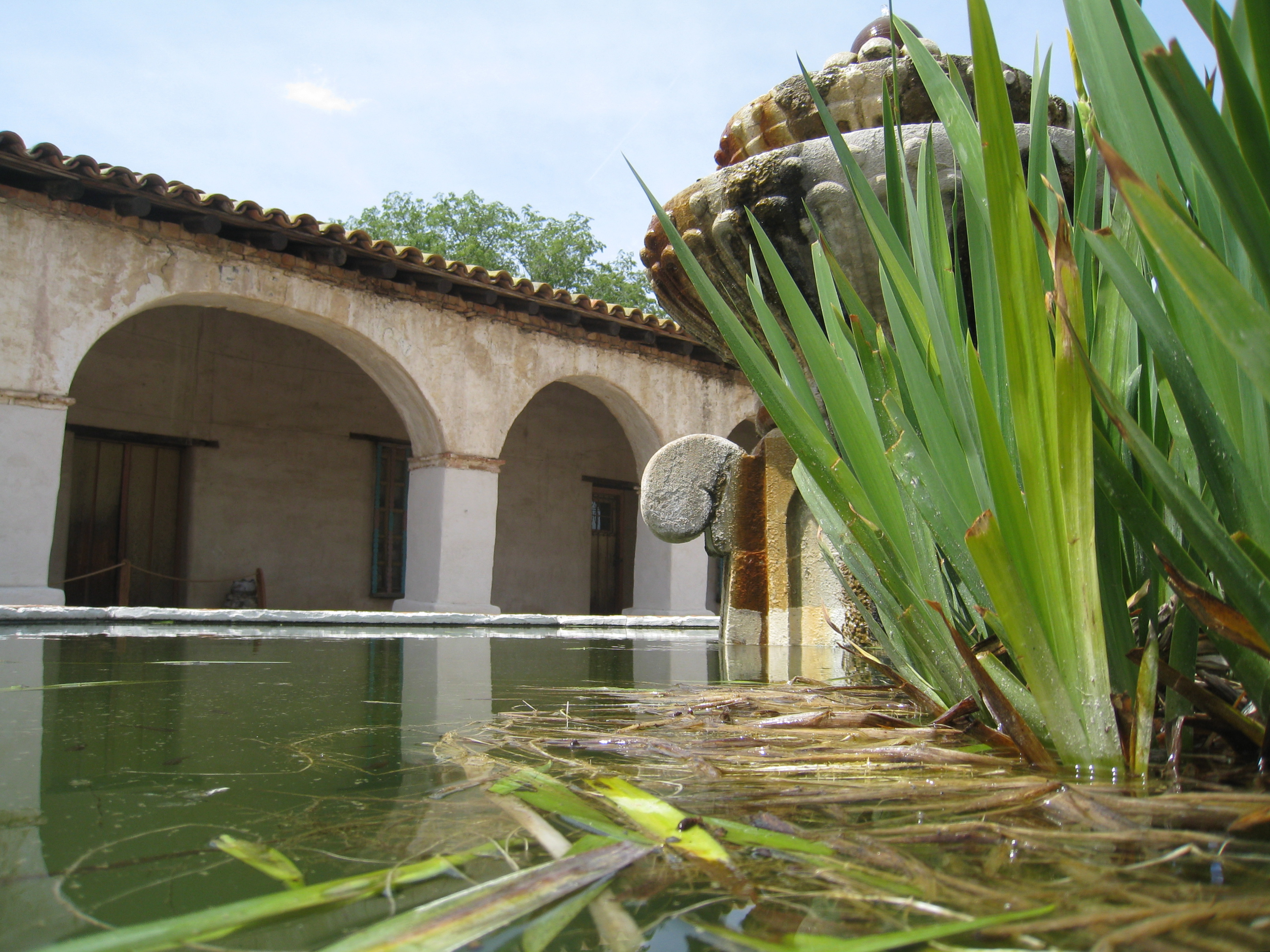
Fountain in plaza

== See also ==
- Spanish missions in California
- List of Spanish missions in California
- USNS Mission San Miguel (AO-129) – a Buenaventura Class fleet oiler built during World War II.
- Ygnacio Coronel (1795–1862). In 1836, Coronel was appointed commissioner of the secularized Mission.
- List of National Historic Landmarks in California
