= Ríos-Caledonia Adobe =

Historic house in San Miguel, California

- U.S. National Register of Historic Places
- California Historical Landmark
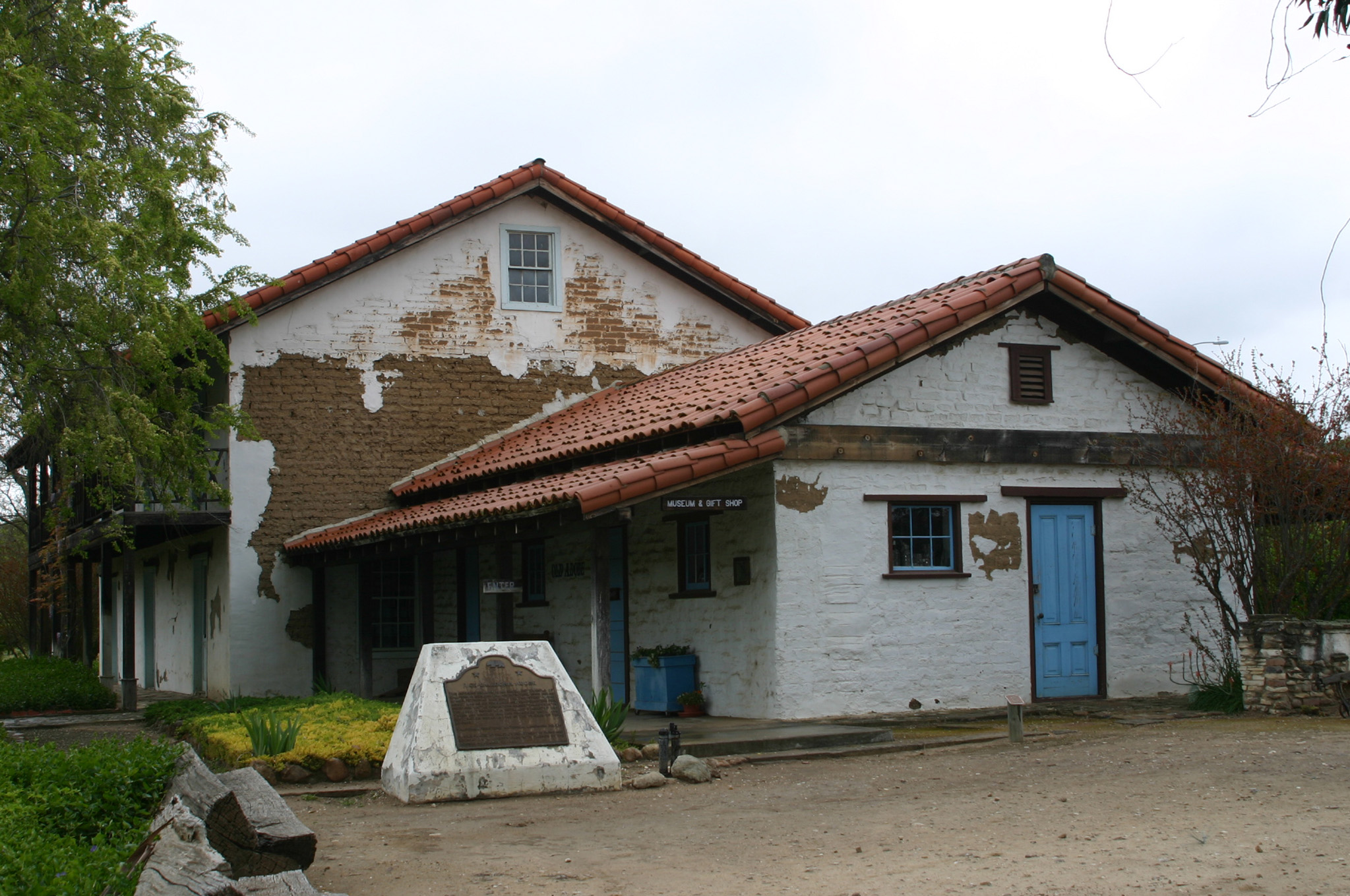
- Ríos-Caledonia Adobe, north side

- Location within California Location within the United States
- Location: 700 Mission St, San Miguel, California
- Coordinates: 35°44′17″N 120°41′56″W
- Area: 1.7 acres (0.69 ha)
- Built: 1835
- Website: www.historic-rios-caledonia.org
- NRHP reference No.: 71000190
- CHISL No.: 936

Significant dates
- Added to NRHP: July 14, 1971
- Designated CHISL: 1981

The Ríos-Caledonia Adobe is a historic adobe house in San Miguel, California. Built in 1835 by Petronilo Ríos, the adobe is a California Historical Landmark. Today, the Ríos-Caledonia Adobe is open to the public as a house museum and library.

== History ==
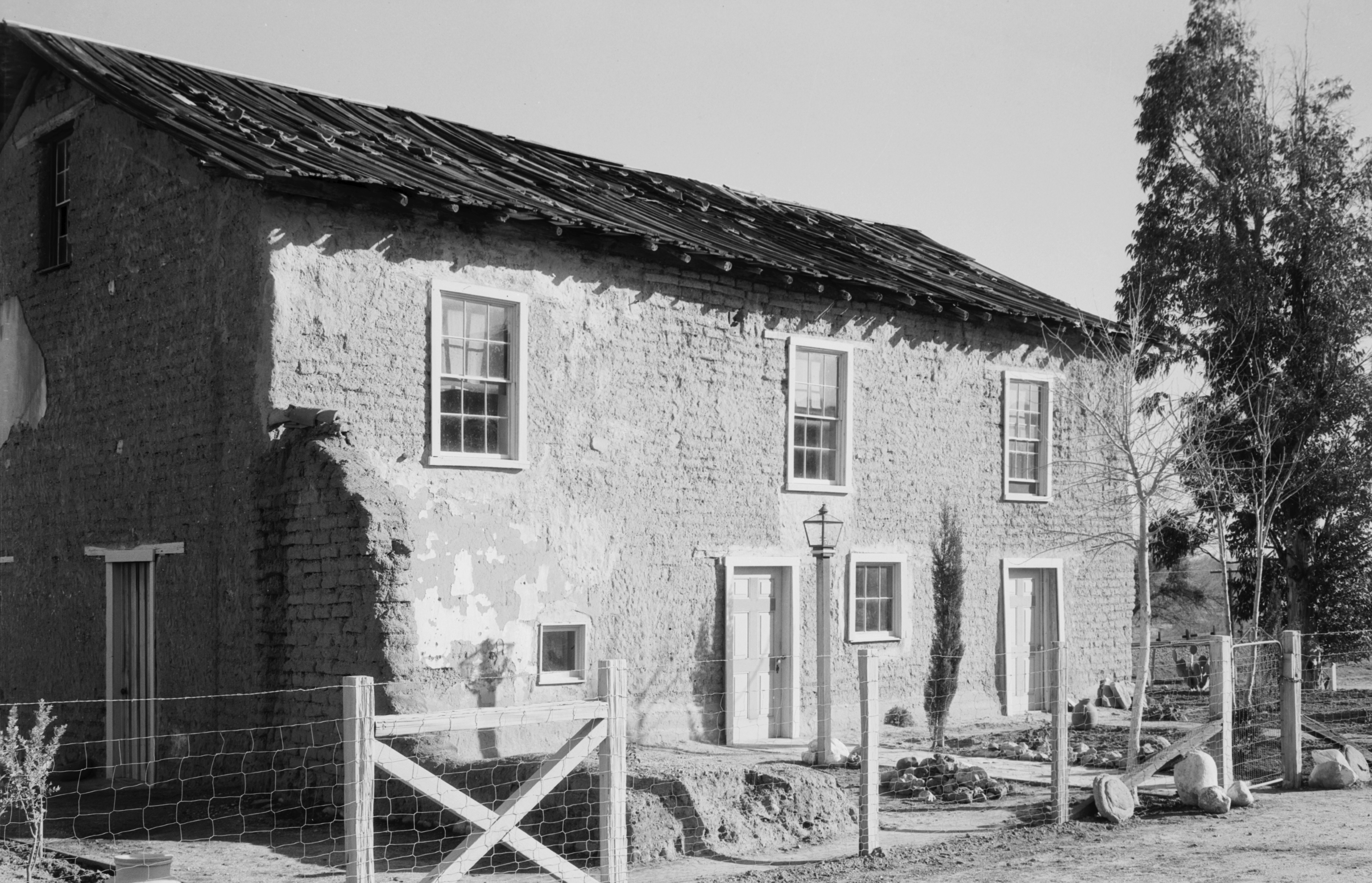
The Ríos-Caledonia Adobe in 1934.

Petronilo Ríos, corporal commanding the Mission San Miguel guard and later owner of Rancho Paso de Robles, supervised the building of the two-story adobe home using indigenous Salinan labor on property belonging to Mission San Miguel (which is now across the street). When the mission property was sold by Governor Pio Pico after the Mexican secularization act of 1833, Ríos and William Reed purchased the mission and adobe in 1846.

The original building was made of adobe, had a roof of hand-made tiles, and used strips of rawhide to tie the pine rafters in place. The Ríos family used the home as a residence until Warran C. Rickard purchased it from the state on a possessory claim.

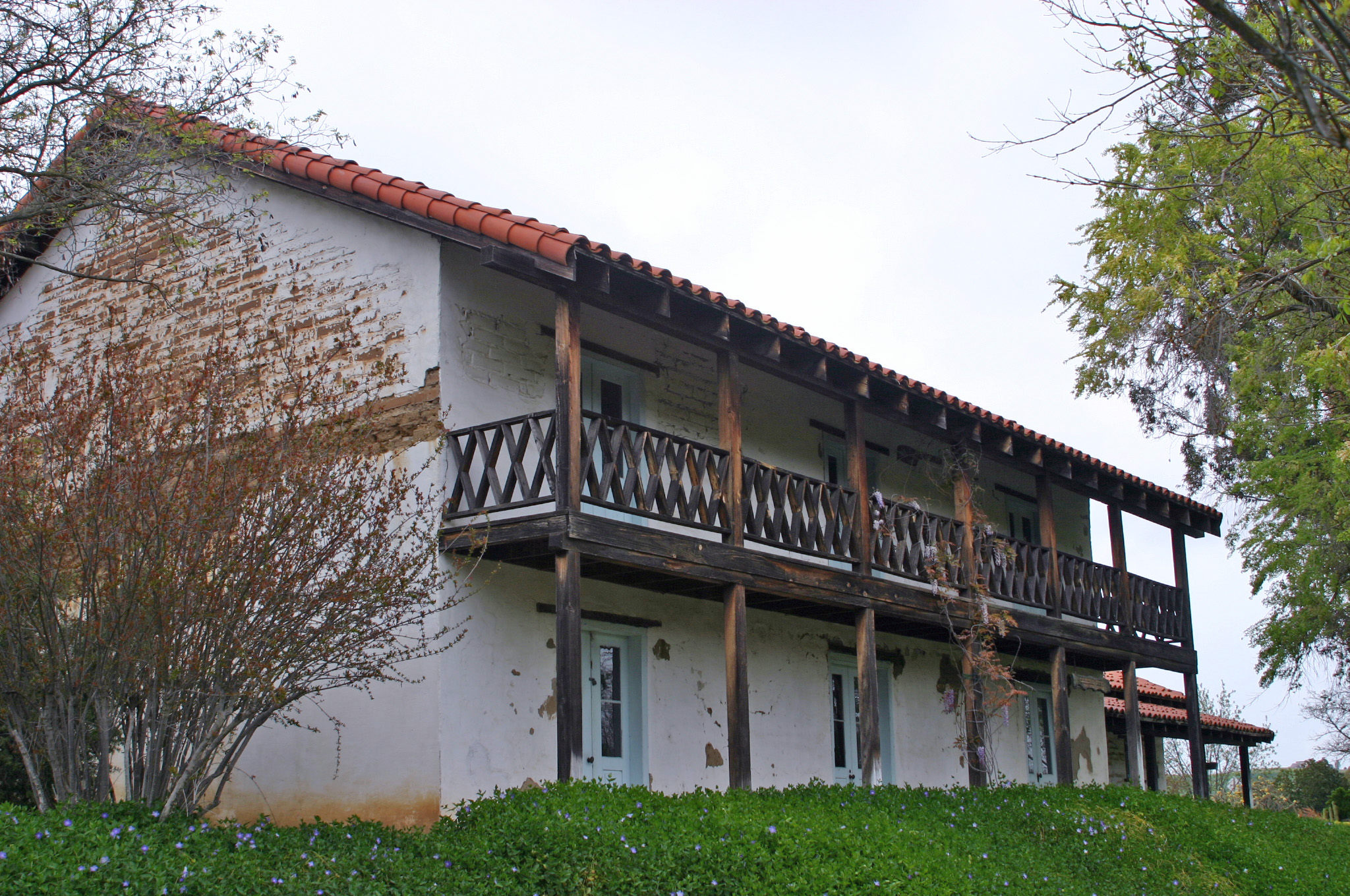
East side

From 1868 until 1886, George Butchart operated the building as the Caledonia Inn, a stagecoach stop, hotel, and tavern on El Camino Real. The arrival of the Southern Pacific Railroad in San Miguel put an end to the Inn. In 1887, it served briefly as an elementary school. After that, it was used for various businesses (including a mattress factory and tailor shop from 1889 to 1895) and again as a home from 1895 to 1910 for various families.

Charles Dorries purchased the property with 6 acres (24,000 m^{2}) of land in 1923 and restored it to use as a tourist attraction. Dorries also built the gift shop in a similar style in 1938 specifically to serve visitors.

By 1964 the adobe had fallen into disrepair. That year, the County of San Luis Obispo purchased it. In 1968, the Friends of the Adobes formed to preserve and restore the adobe.

== Current ==
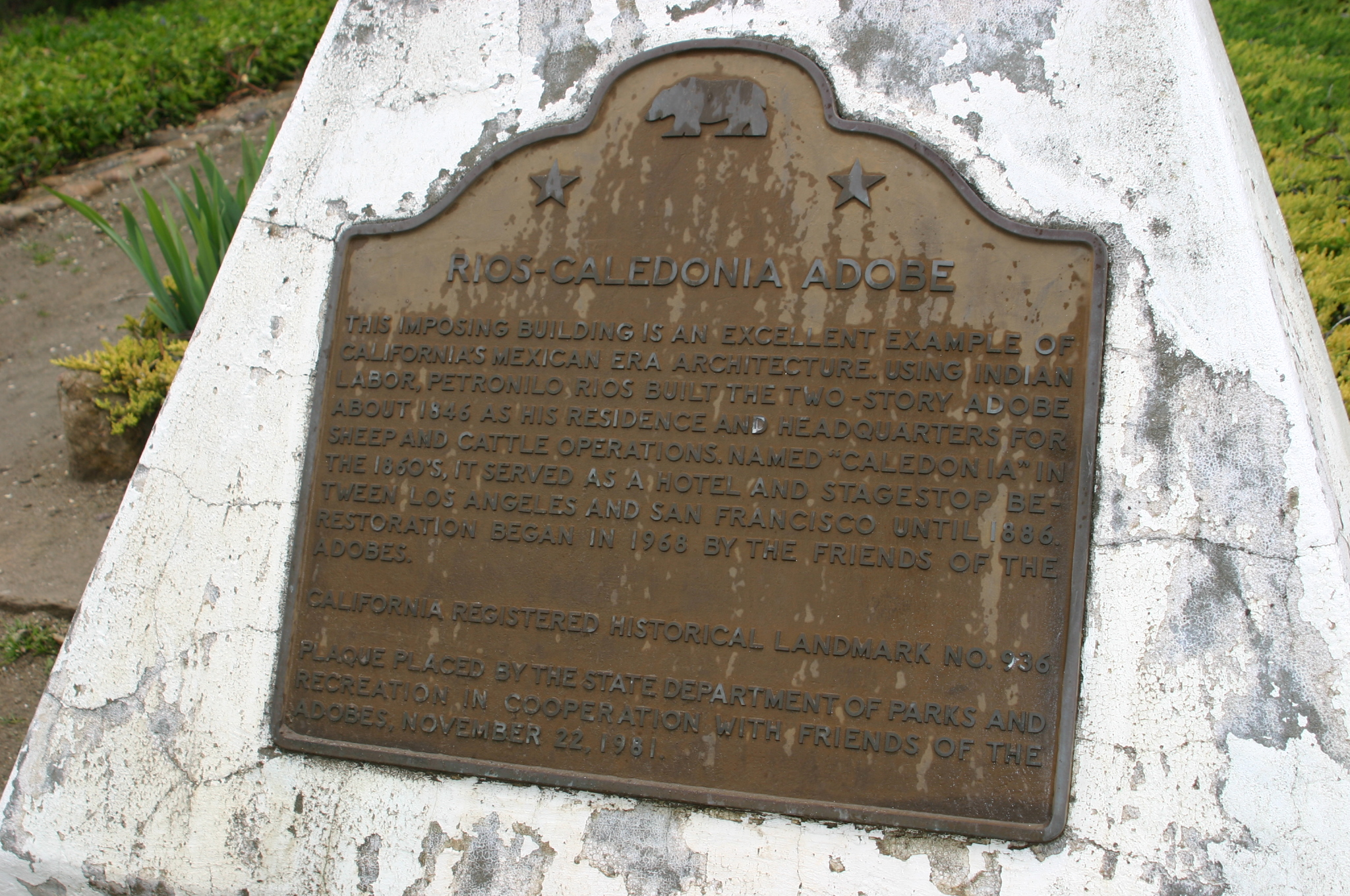
Landmark plaque

Major restoration work completed in 1972, and the building was then formally dedicated. A building that was added in 1930 serves as a local history research library. A museum and gift shop opened in June 1978, also opening the adobe for tours. The site is now operated as a county park.
