= San Miguel, California =

- Unincorporated community Census-Designated Place
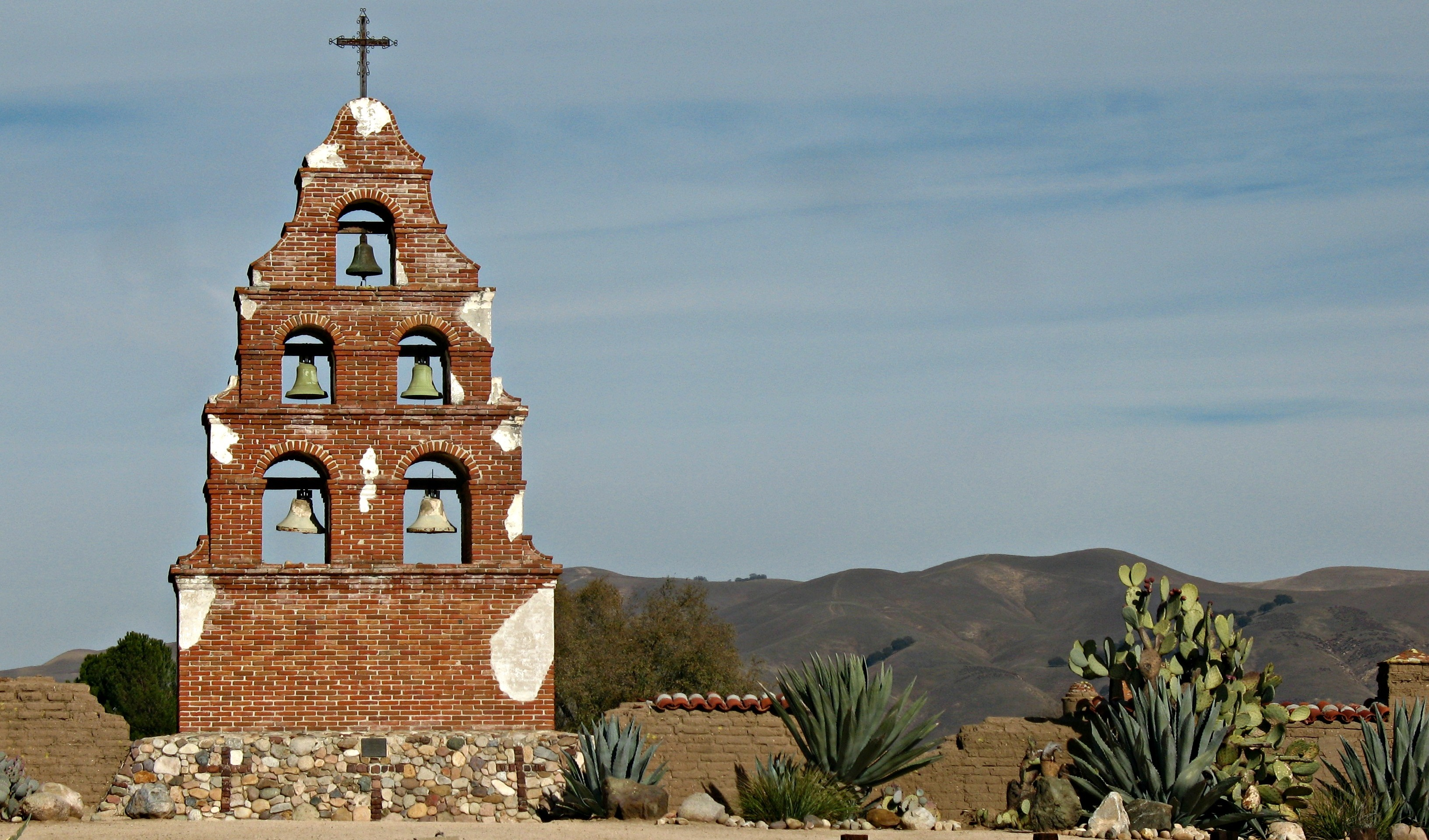
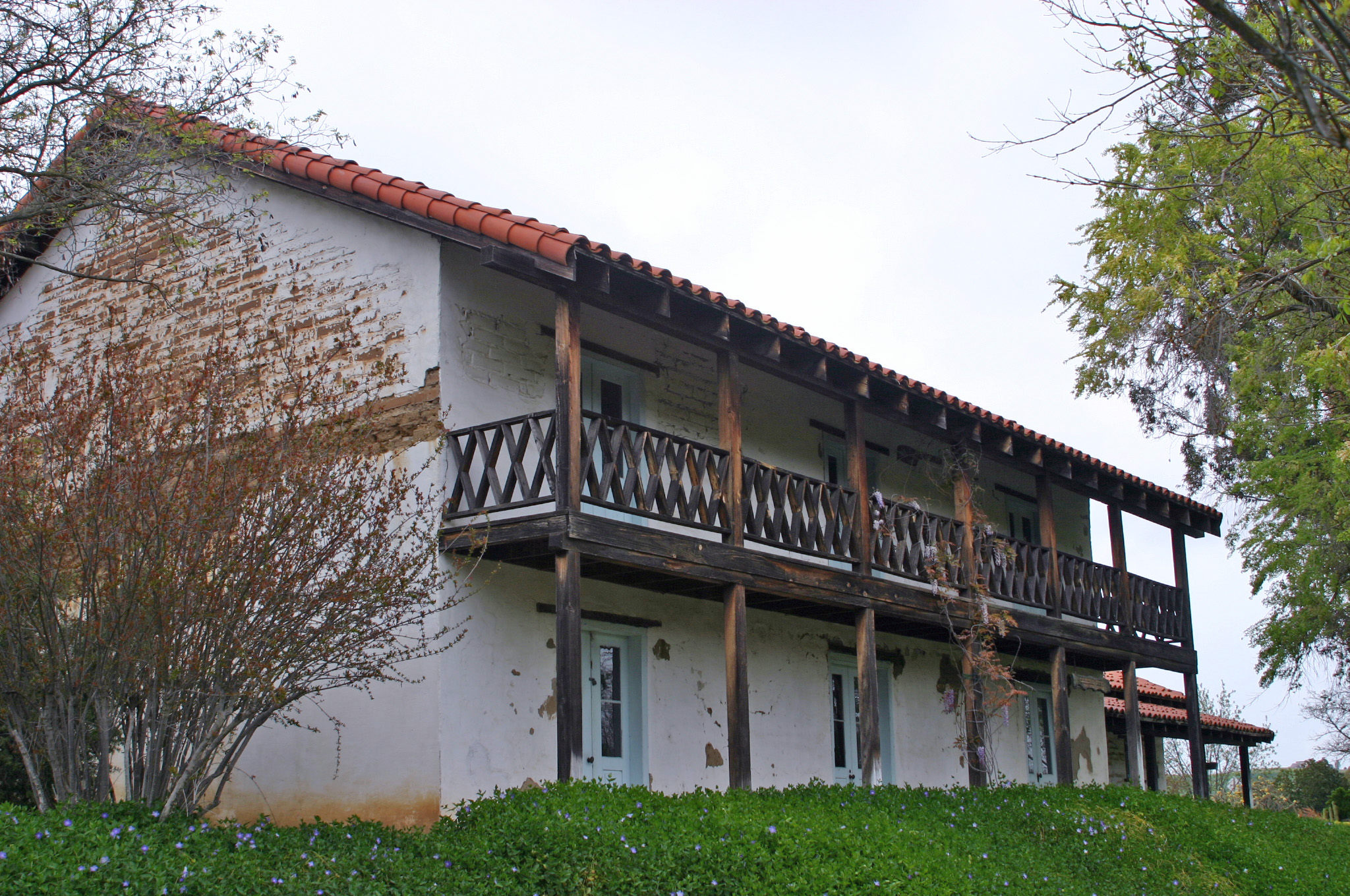
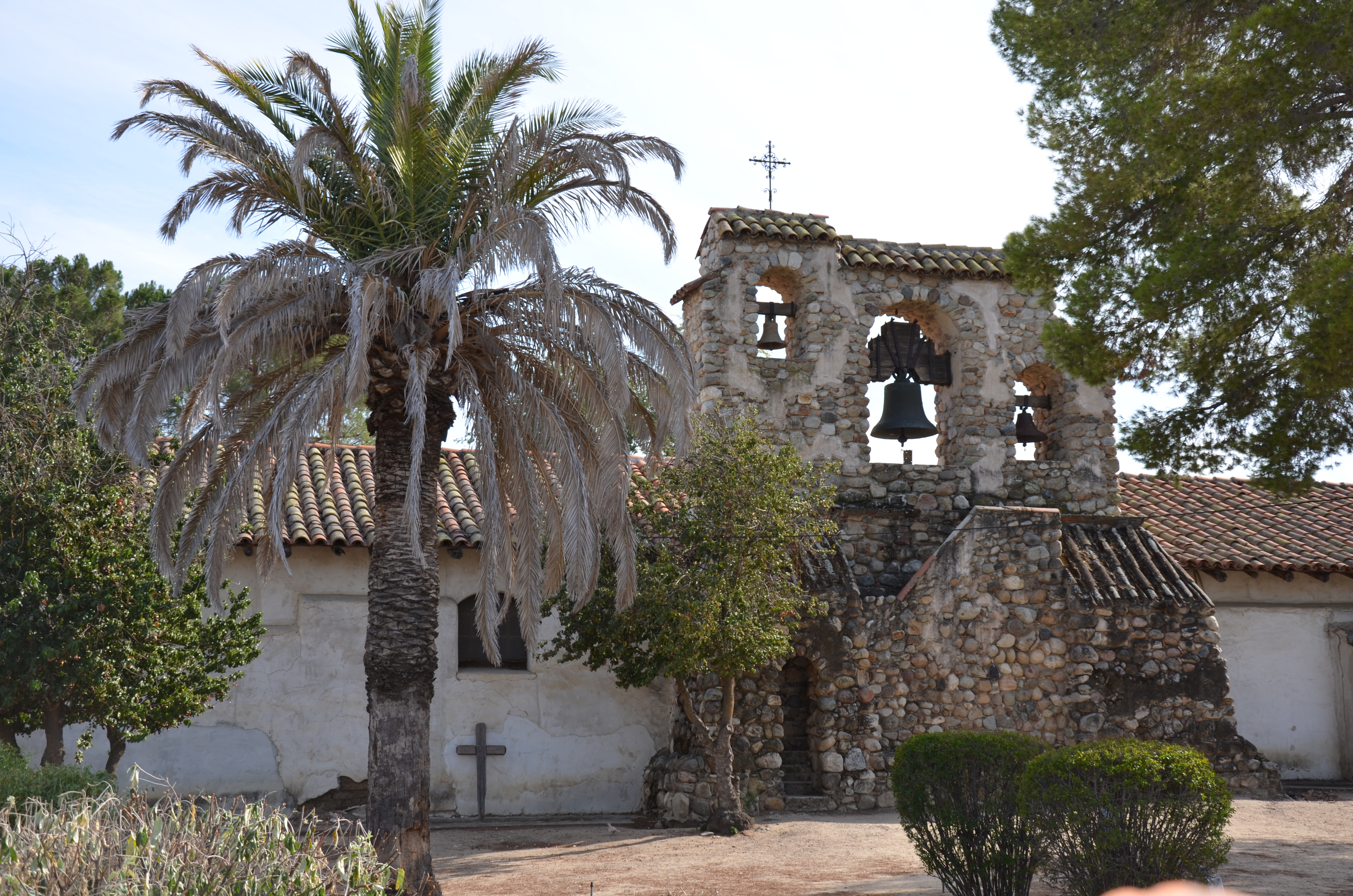
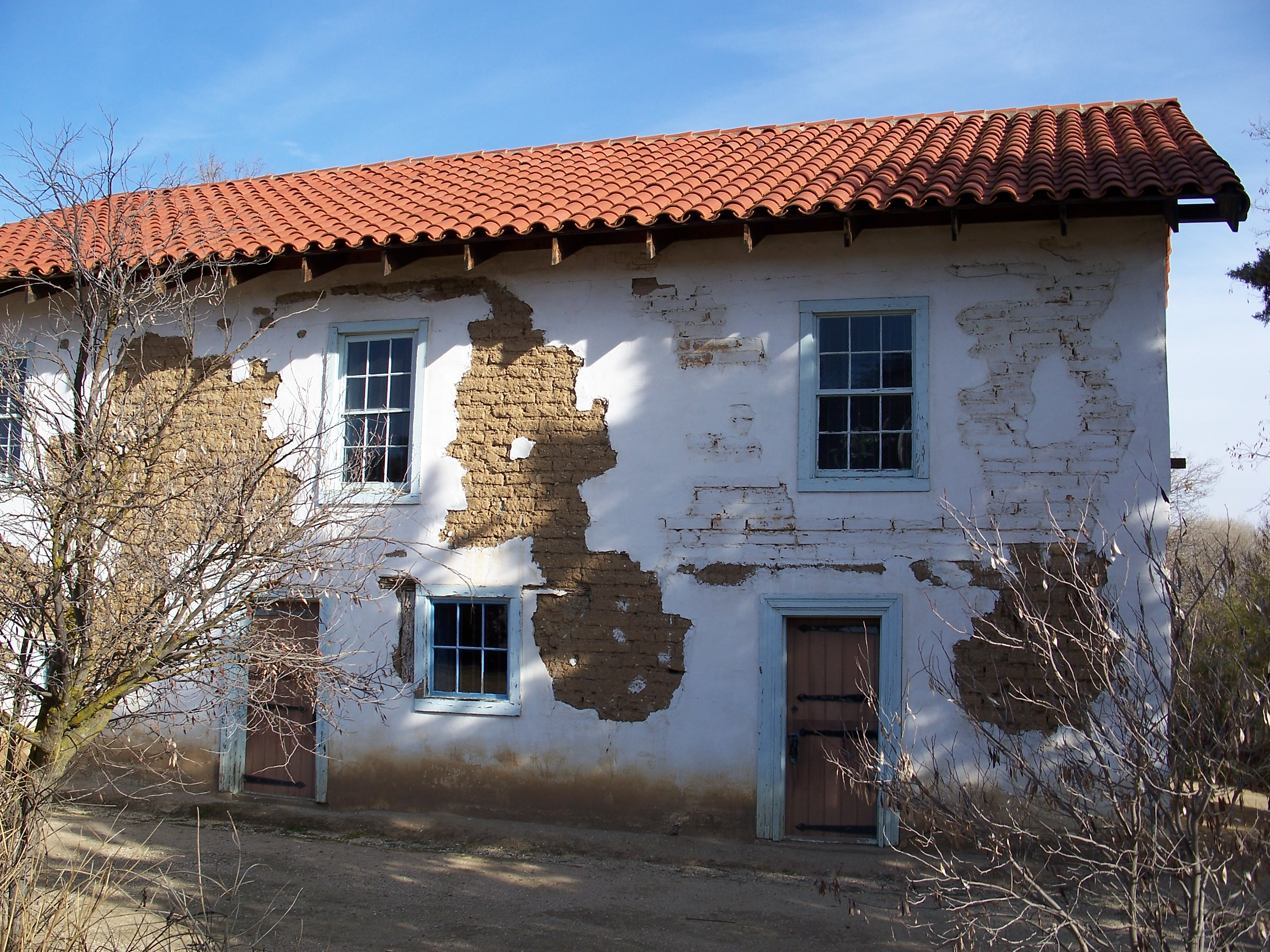
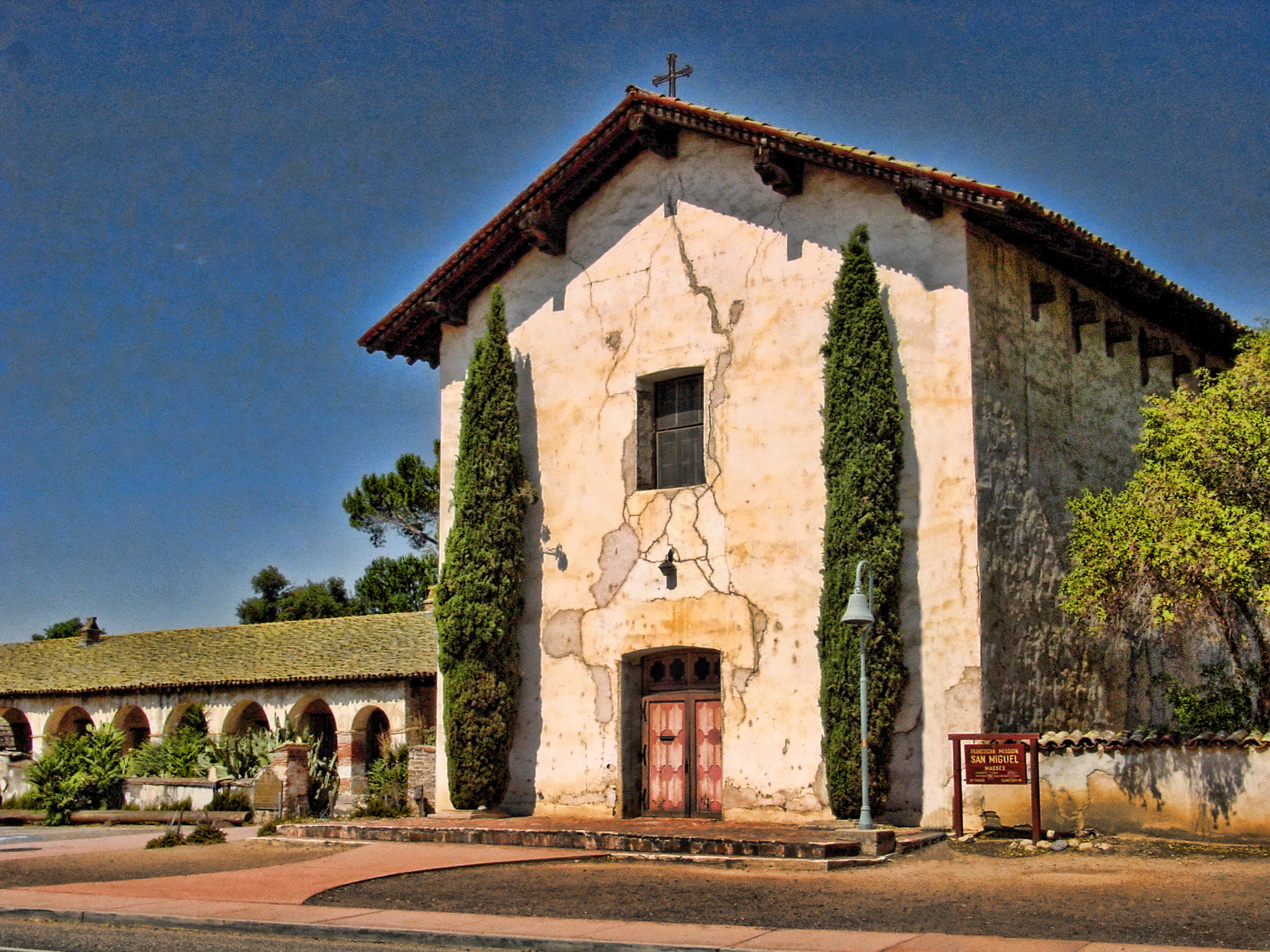
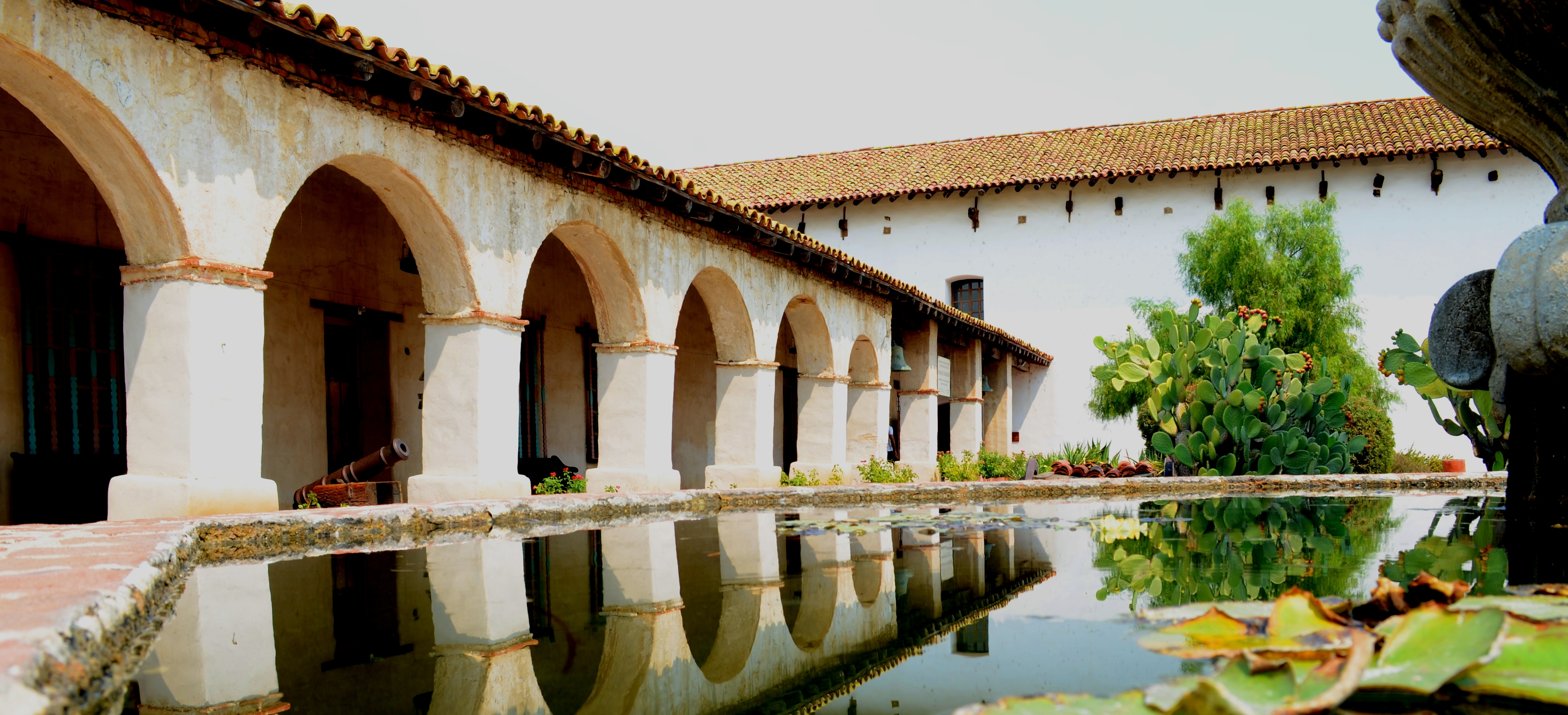
- Mission San Miguel Arcángel & Rios-Caledonia Adobe

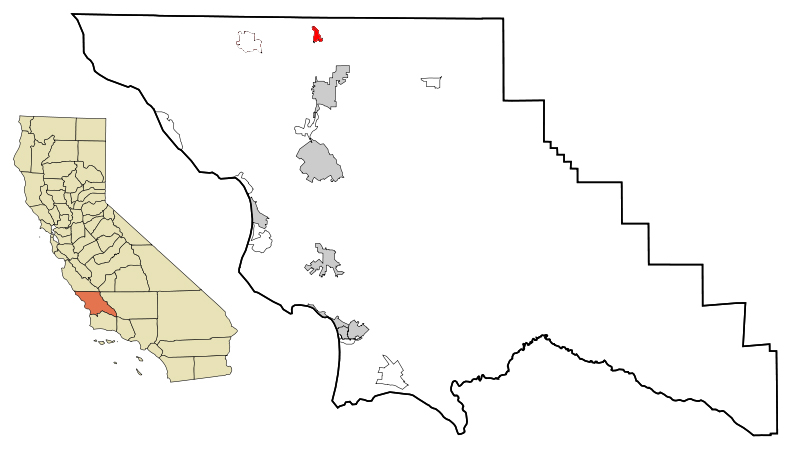
- Location in San Luis Obispo County and the state of California

- Location within the United States
- Coordinates: 35°45′5″N 120°41′43″W
- Country: United States
- State: California
- County: San Luis Obispo

Government
  - Type: Community Services District

Area
  - Total: 1.680 sq mi (4.351 km^{2})
  - Land: 1.680 sq mi (4.351 km^{2})
  - Water: 0 sq mi (0 km^{2}) 0%
- Elevation: 636 ft (194 m)

Population (2020)
  - Total: 3,172
  - Density: 1,888/sq mi (729.0/km^{2})
- Time zone: UTC-8 (Pacific (PST))
  - Summer (DST): UTC-7 (PDT)
- ZIP code: 93451
- Area code: 805
- FIPS code: 06-68266
- GNIS feature ID: 1661389

San Miguel (Spanish for "St. Michael") is an unincorporated community in San Luis Obispo County, California, United States. As of the 2020 census, the population was 3,172. For statistical purposes, the United States Census Bureau has defined San Miguel as a census-designated place (CDP). San Miguel was founded by the Spanish in 1797, when Mission San Miguel Arcángel was established by Fermín de Lasuén. San Miguel is a tourist destination with historic architecture and vineyards, as part of the Paso Robles wine region.

== History ==
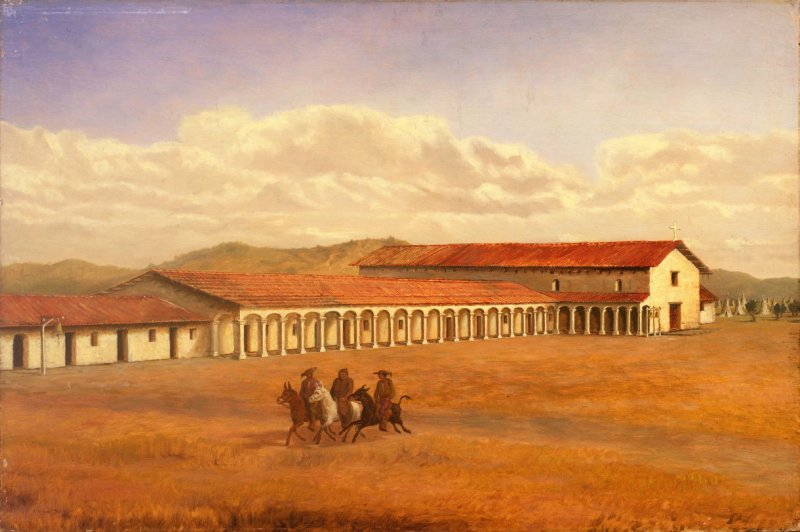
Mission San Miguel Arcángel was founded in 1797 by Fermín de Lasuén.

The area of San Miguel and the rest of the southern Salinas Valley was inhabited by the Salinans, an Indigenous Californian nation.

The Spanish founded the settlement at San Miguel on 25 July 1797, when Fermín de Lasuén established Mission San Miguel Arcángel, under the authority of the Franciscan Order. The site of the mission was specifically chosen due to its proximity to the large number of Salinan villages in the area. The interior of the mission church features murals executed under the direction of the famed artist Esteban Munrás in the 1820s.

The mission's location between Mission San Luis Obispo and Mission San Antonio de Padua provided a stop on the trip that had previously taken two days. In 1803, the mission reported an Indian population of 908, while its lands grazed 809 cattle, 3,223 sheep, 342 horses and 29 mules. That year's harvest included about 2,186 fanegas of wheat and corn (A fanega was about 220 pounds or 100 kilograms). Most of the mission burned, while still being developed, in 1806. It was rebuilt within a year.

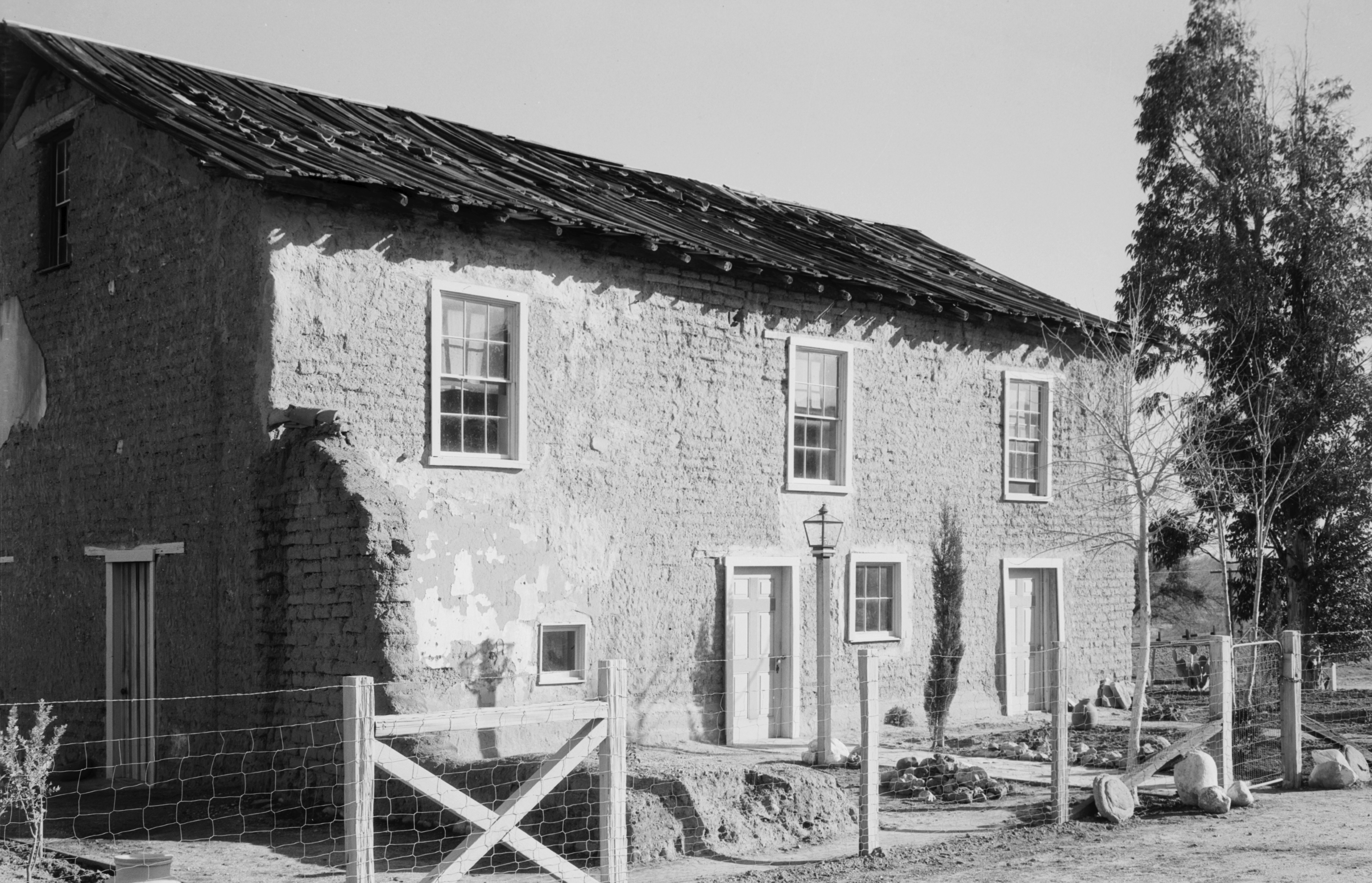
The Ríos-Caledonia Adobe, believed to have been built in 1835 for Petronilo Ríos, shown here in 1934

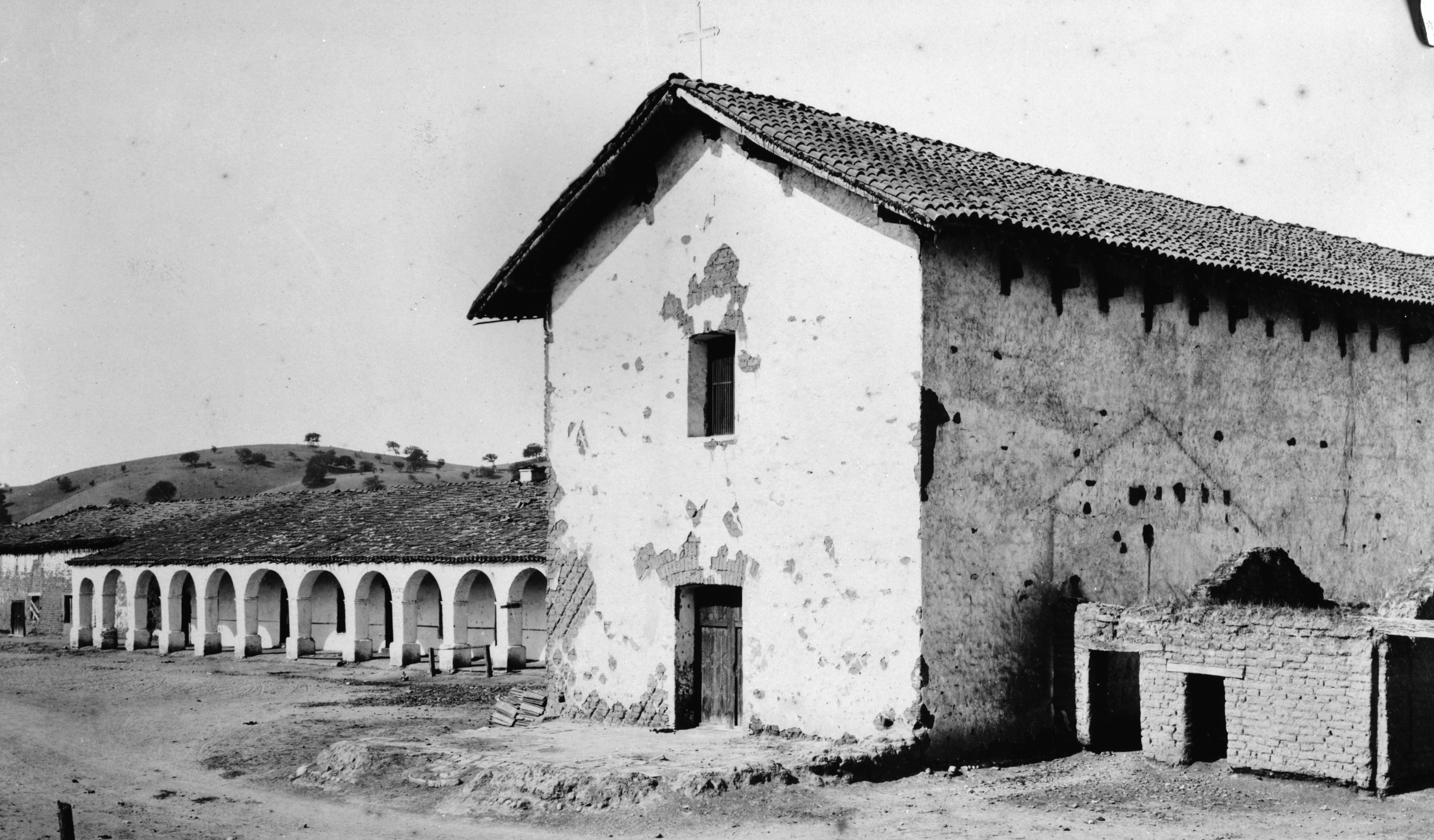
Mission San Miguel Arcángel, 1940

The Rios-Caledonia Adobe was built in 1835 just south of Mission San Miguel as a home for the overseer of mission lands.

On July 15, 1836, following the Mexican secularization of the missions, Mission San Miguel Arcángel was acquired by Ygnacio Coronel, a noted Californio ranchero and politician.

In 1846, Governor Pío Pico sold Mission San Miguel Arcángel for $600 to Petronilo Ríos and William Reed. Reed used the Mission as a family residence and a store. In 1848, Reed and his family were murdered, leaving the Mission vacant for a period of time. The Mission was a stopping place for miners coming from Los Angeles to San Francisco, and, consequently, was used as a saloon, dance hall, storeroom and living quarters.

In 1859, President James Buchanan returned the mission to the Catholic Church. In 1878, after 38 years without a resident priest, Padre Philip Farrelly became the first pastor of Mission San Miguel Arcángel since the secularization. In 1928, Mission San Miguel Arcángel and Mission San Antonio de Padua were both returned to the Franciscan Order, which led to their restorations and repairs.

The 2003 San Simeon earthquake caused severe damage to the sanctuary at Mission San Miguel. The Catholic Church considered closing the parish due to the extensive damage and the estimated $15 million cost of repair; however, the work has since been completed and the mission has since reopened.

In 2011, San Miguel's local business community formed the San Miguel Chamber of Commerce in order to promote the village's tourism and agricultural industries.

== Geography ==
According to the United States Census Bureau, the CDP has a total area of 1.7 square miles (4.4 km^{2}), all land.

== Demographics ==
Historical population
Census	Pop.	Note	%±
1990	1,123		—
2000	1,427		27.1%
2010	2,336		63.7%
2020	3,172		35.8%
U.S. Decennial Census; 1990 2000 2010

San Miguel first appeared as a census designated place in the 1990 U.S. census.

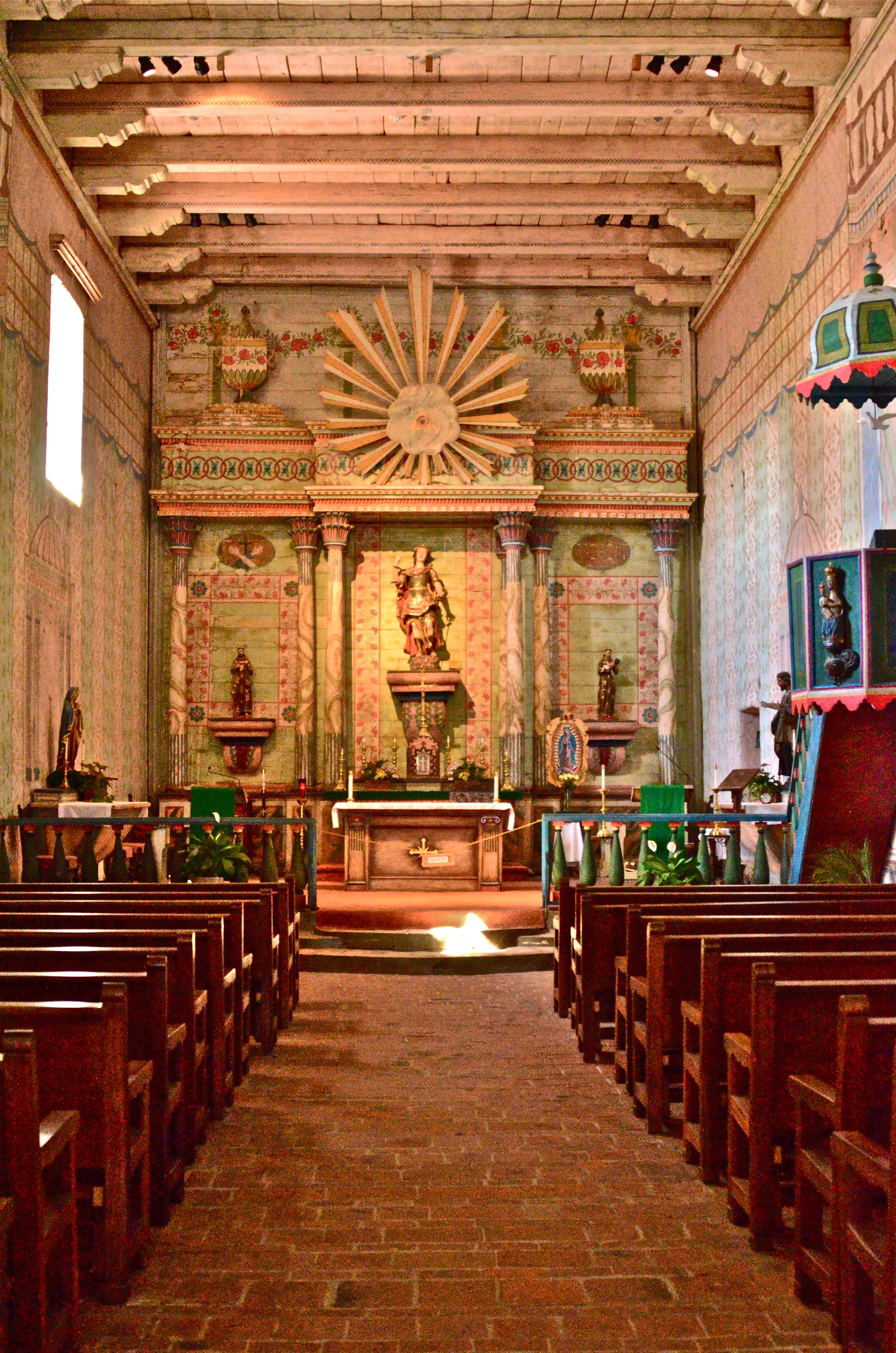
The interior of Mission San Miguel Arcángel is one of the best preserved of all the missions of California. It features murals executed by noted artist Esteban Munrás in the 1820s.

=== 2020 ===
The 2020 United States census reported that San Miguel had a population of 3,172. The population density was 1,888.1 inhabitants per square mile (729.0/km^{2}). The racial makeup was 38.7% White, 1.5% African American, 2.7% Native American, 1.8% Asian, 0.1% Pacific Islander, 30.4% from other races, and 24.8% from two or more races. Hispanic or Latino of any race were 63.4% of the population.

The whole population lived in households. There were 917 households, out of which 49.6% included children under the age of 18, 56.5% were married-couple households, 8.9% were cohabiting couple households, 19.3% had a female householder with no partner present, and 15.3% had a male householder with no partner present. 16.1% of households were one person, and 4.4% were one person aged 65 or older. The average household size was 3.46. There were 710 families (77.4% of all households).

The age distribution was 33.0% under the age of 18, 8.8% aged 18 to 24, 32.3% aged 25 to 44, 19.4% aged 45 to 64, and 6.5% who were 65 years of age or older. The median age was 29.8 years. For every 100 females, there were 98.2 males.

There were 967 housing units at an average density of 575.6 units per square mile (222.2 units/km^{2}), of which 917 (94.8%) were occupied. Of these, 63.1% were owner-occupied, and 36.9% were occupied by renters.

In 2023, the US Census Bureau estimated that the median household income was $76,563, and the per capita income was $22,286. About 21.8% of families and 23.1% of the population were below the poverty line.

=== 2010 ===
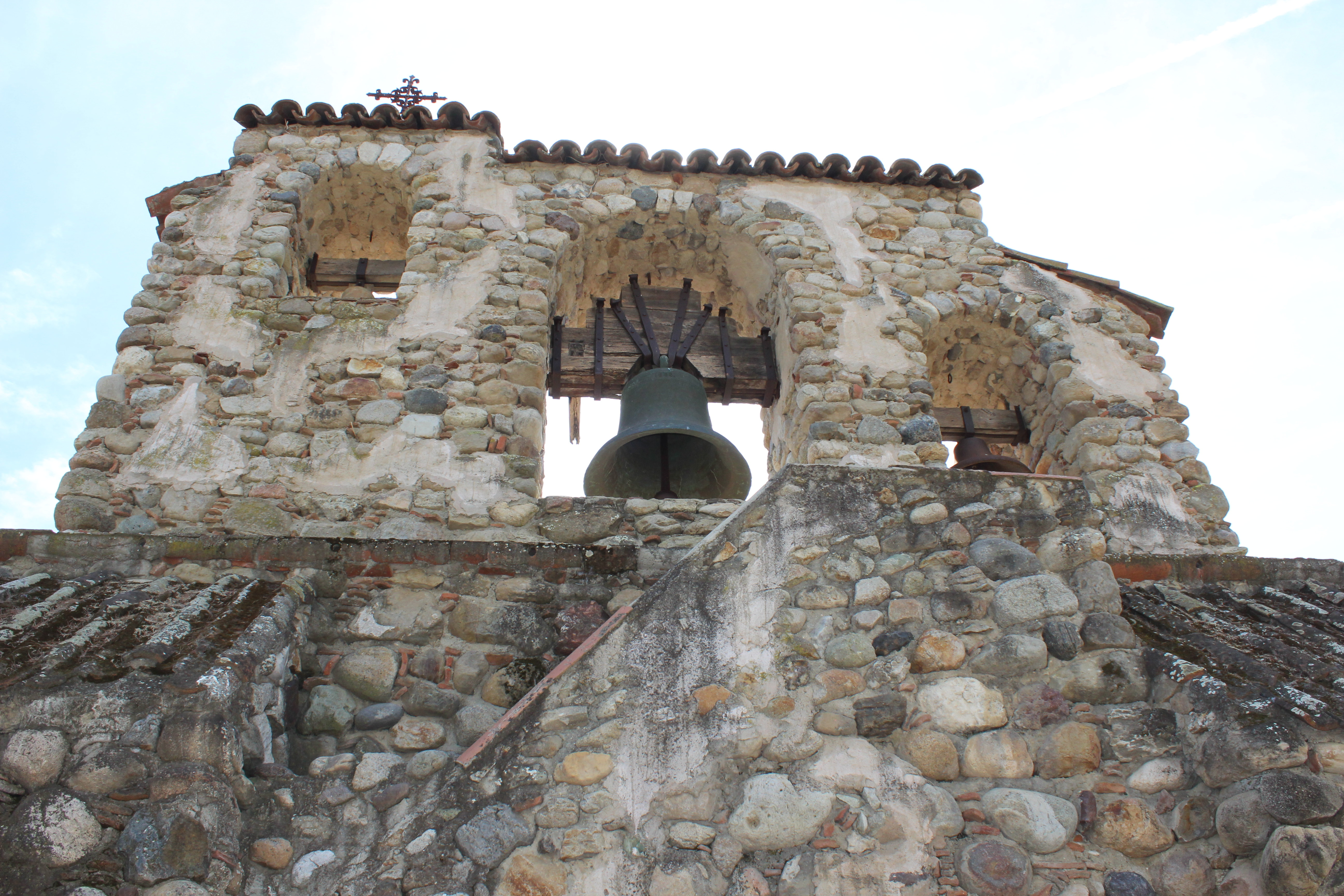
The San Miguel bell tower

The 2010 United States census reported that San Miguel had a population of 2,336. The population density was 1,369.9 inhabitants per square mile (528.9/km^{2}). The racial makeup of San Miguel was 1,638 (70.1%) White, 65 (2.8%) African American, 58 (2.5%) Native American, 19 (0.8%) Asian, 1 (0.0%) Pacific Islander, 474 (20.3%) from other races, and 81 (3.5%) from two or more races. Hispanic or Latino of any race were 1,196 persons (51.2%).

The Census reported that 2,324 people (99.5% of the population) lived in households, 12 (0.5%) lived in non-institutionalized group quarters, and 0 (0%) were institutionalized.

There were 698 households, out of which 358 (51.3%) had children under the age of 18 living in them, 379 (54.3%) were opposite-sex married couples living together, 93 (13.3%) had a female householder with no husband present, 57 (8.2%) had a male householder with no wife present. There were 73 (10.5%) unmarried opposite-sex partnerships, and 8 (1.1%) same-sex married couples or partnerships. 115 households (16.5%) were made up of individuals, and 25 (3.6%) had someone living alone who was 65 years of age or older. The average household size was 3.33. There were 529 families (75.8% of all households); the average family size was 3.73.

The population was spread out, with 774 people (33.1%) under the age of 18, 262 people (11.2%) aged 18 to 24, 711 people (30.4%) aged 25 to 44, 481 people (20.6%) aged 45 to 64, and 108 people (4.6%) who were 65 years of age or older. The median age was 28.3 years. For every 100 females, there were 103.8 males. For every 100 females age 18 and over, there were 101.3 males.

There were 791 housing units at an average density of 463.9 per square mile (179.1/km^{2}), of which 435 (62.3%) were owner-occupied, and 263 (37.7%) were occupied by renters. The homeowner vacancy rate was 3.7%; the rental vacancy rate was 8.0%. 1,399 people (59.9% of the population) lived in owner-occupied housing units and 925 people (39.6%) lived in rental housing units.

== Government ==
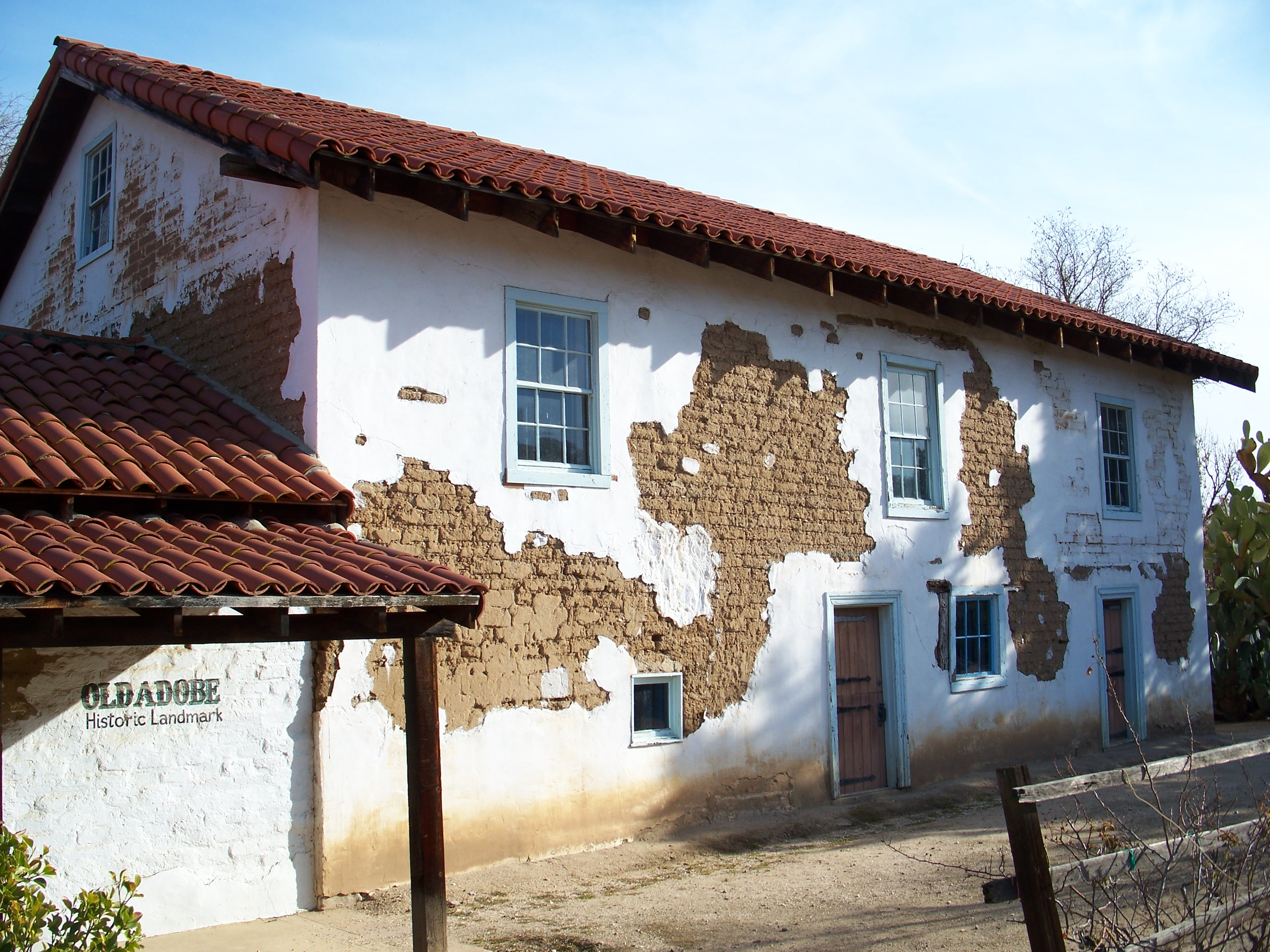
The Ríos-Caledonia Adobe

In the California State Legislature, San Miguel is in the 17th senatorial district, represented by Democrat John Laird, and in the 30th Assembly district, represented by Democrat Dawn Addis.

In the United States House of Representatives, San Miguel is in California's 19th congressional district, represented by Democrat Jimmy Panetta.

The local government organization is the San Miguel Community Services District (CSD).

== Education ==
San Miguel is served by the San Miguel Joint Union Elementary School District and by the Paso Robles Joint Unified School District for grades 9-12 only.
